= Alexander McLean =

Alexander McLean or MacLean may refer to:

- Alexander McLean (Province of Canada politician) (1793–1875), Canadian political figure
- AJ McLean (born 1978), American musician and singer
- Alec McLean (born 1950), New Zealand rower
- Alex McLean, British musician and researcher
- Alex MacLean (born 1947), American photographer
- Alex MacLean (footballer), Scottish footballer
- Alexander Daniel McLean, Canadian politician
- Alexander Grant McLean (1824–1862), Surveyor General of New South Wales (Australia)
- Alexander Kenneth Maclean (1869–1942), Canadian politician and judge
- Alexander Neil McLean (1885–1967), former member of the Senate of Canada from New Brunswick
- Alexander McLean (activist) (born 1985), founder of African Prisons Project
- Alexander McLean, sea captain and the basis for the protagonist in The Sea-Wolf, a Jack London story
- Alexander Maclean, 13th Laird of Ardgour (1764–1855), soldier and Highland laird
- Alexander Maclean (painter) (1840–1877), Scottish painter
