= Forth Royal Garrison Artillery =

Forth Royal Garrison Artillery 505th (Forth) Coast Regiment, RA 414th (Forth) Coast Regiment, RA
- Cap Badge of the Royal Regiment of Artillery
- Active: 1910–1953
- Country: United Kingdom
- Branch: Territorial Force
- Role: Coast Artillery
- Part of: Scottish Command
- Garrison/HQ: Edinburgh

The Forth Royal Garrison Artillery and its successors were Scottish part-time coast defence units of the British Army from 1908 to 1956. Although they saw no active service, they supplied trained gunners to siege batteries engaged on the Western Front during World War I.

== Origin ==
When the Territorial Force (TF) was created from the Yeomanry and the old Volunteer Force under the Haldane Reforms of 1908 (which also resulted in the disbandment of most Militia Artillery units, such as the Argyll and Bute Militia Artillery and The Edinburgh Artillery Militia), a new 'Defended Ports' unit of the Royal Garrison Artillery (RGA) was formed from two Dunbartonshire companies of the 1st Renfrew and Dumbarton RGA (Volunteers), part of the 1st Argyll & Bute RGA (Volunteers), and personnel from the 1st Edinburgh City RGA (Volunteers). The new unit, named the Forth & Clyde Royal Garrison Artillery, totalled eight companies with its headquarters (HQ) at Edinburgh, but in 1910 it was split up, the Clyde elements being detached to form an independent unit, the Clyde RGA, while the remainder became the Forth Royal Garrison Artillery at Edinburgh, with two detached companies on the north bank of the Firth of Forth.

The Forth RGA had the following organisation:

- HQ at Easter Road Barracks, Edinburgh
- Nos 1–4 Companies at Edinburgh
- No 5 Company at Hunter Street drill hall, Kirkcaldy
- No 6 Company at East Leven Street, Burntisland

It was designated as a Defended Ports Unit in Scottish Coast Defences, which was also based at Edinburgh and included the Regulars of No 21 Company RGA at Fort Leith. By 1914, these two units were responsible for the manning the following guns in the Forth defences:

- 6 × 9.2-inch
- 12 × 6-inch
- 12 × 4.7-inch and 4-inch Quick-Fire (QF) guns
- 12 × 12-pounder QF

== World War I ==
=== Mobilisation ===
On the outbreak of war, the Forth RGA mobilised under the command of Lieutenant-Colonel H. O'Connor, VD. Shortly afterwards, TF units were invited to volunteer for Overseas Service and, on 15 August 1914, the War Office (WO) issued instructions to separate those men who had signed up for Home Service only, and form these into reserve units. On 31 August, the formation of a reserve or 2nd Line unit was authorised for each 1st Line unit where 60 per cent or more of the men had volunteered for Overseas Service. The titles of these 2nd Line units would be the same as the original, but distinguished by a '2/' prefix. In this way, duplicate companies and batteries were created, releasing the 1st Line units to be sent overseas.

By October 1914, the campaign on the Western Front was bogging down into Trench warfare and there was an urgent need for batteries of Siege artillery to be sent to France. The WO decided that the TF coastal gunners were well enough trained to take over many of the duties in the coastal defences, releasing Regular RGA gunners for service in the field, and 1st line RGA companies had been authorised to increase their strength by 50 per cent.

Although complete defended ports units never left the UK, they did supply drafts of trained gunners to RGA units serving overseas. They also provided cadres as the basis on which to form complete new units for front line service. 70th Siege Battery formed in October 1915 was based on a company (probably 1/4th Company) from the Forth RGA, and 108th Siege Battery formed in the Forth Defences in February 1916 also drew its cadre from the unit. A draft of 50–60 men from the Forth RGA volunteered to serve together in 178th Siege Battery when it was formed at King's Park, Edinburgh, in June 1916. A number of other siege batteries formed in the Forth Defences in 1915–16 (89th, 90th, 118th, (Note: A page (no longer available) on the Long, Long Trail website stated that 118th Siege Battery was a New Army ('Kitchener's Army') unit with gunners drawn from the TF units of the Forth defences, and considered itself to be an Edinburgh unit.) 138th, 152nd, 153rd, 181st, 210th, 228th, 251st, 263rd, 293rd, and 311th) may also have included trained men from the Forth RGA among the recruits, although the Army Council Instructions did not specifically order this.

Under Army Council Instruction 686 of April 1917, the coastal defence companies of the RGA (TF) were reorganised. The RGA companies serving in the Forth garrison (including one from the North Scottish RGA) were reduced from 12 companies to 10, and were to be kept up to strength with non-TF recruits:

- 1/1st Company – became 1st Company
- 1/2nd Company – became 2nd Company
- 1/3rd Company – became 3rd Company
- 1/5th Company – became 4th Company
- 1/6th Company – became 5th Company
- 2/1st Company – became 6th Company
- 2/2nd Company – became 7th Company
- 2/3rd Company – became 8th Company
- 2/4th Company – became 9th Company
- 2/5th Company – became 10th Company

2/6th Company Forth RGA and 2/1st Company North Scottish RGA were disbanded

In April 1918, the Forth Garrison comprised the following batteries:

- Outer Defences: No 19 Coastal Fire Command, Inchkeith (including No 20 Company RGA)
  - Inchkeith Battery 1 – 3 × 9.2-inch Mk X guns
  - Inchkeith Battery 2 – 6 × 6-inch Mk VII guns
  - Kinghorn Battery 1 – 1 × 9.2-inch Mk X
  - Kinghorn Battery 2 – 2 × 6-inch Mk VII
  - Pettycur Battery – 2 × 6-inch Mk VII
  - Leith Docks – 2 × 6-inch Mk VII
- Middle Defences: No 20 Coastal Fire Command, Inchcolm (including No 21 Company RGA)
  - Cramond Battery – 2 × 12-pdr QF
  - Inchmickery Battery – 4 × 4-inch QF
  - Inchcolm Battery 1 – 2 × 6-inch Mk VII
  - Inchcolm Battery 2– 4 × 4.7-inch QF
  - Inchcolm Battery 3 – 4 × 4-inch QF
- Inner Defences: No 21 Coastal Fire Command, Carlingnose Point, North Queensferry
  - Hound Point Battery – 2 × 12-pdr QF
  - Invergarvie Battery – 4 × 12-pdr QF
  - Coastguard Battery – 2 × 12-pdr QF
  - Downing Point Battery – 2 × 12-pdr QF
  - Armoured Train, Craigentinny – 2 × 12-pdr QF

These defences never saw action during the war. The Forth RGA was placed in suspended animation in 1919.

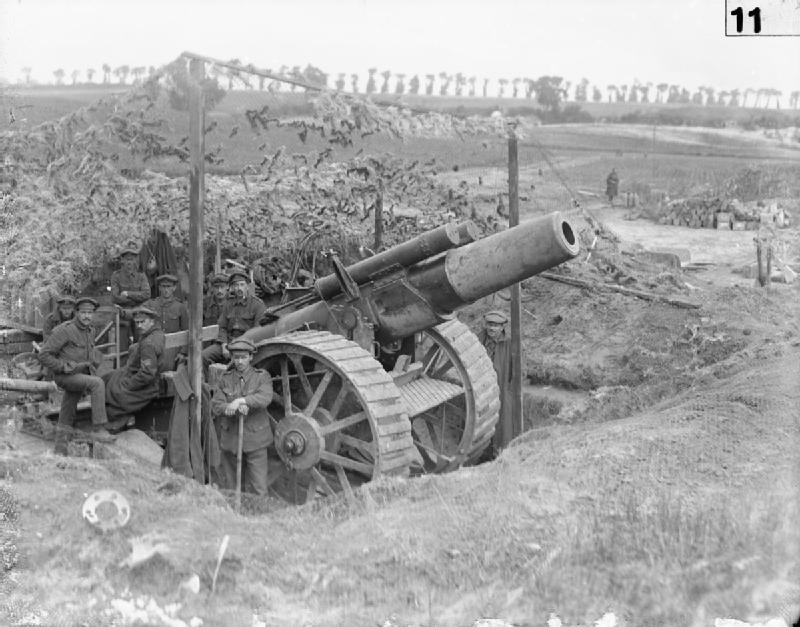
8-inch Howitzer Mk I on the Somme, July 1916.

=== 70th Siege Battery, RGA ===
70th Siege Battery was formed at Dover under War Office Instruction No 144 of 9 October 1915 from one company (probably 1/4th Company) of the Forth RGA, which provided half the personnel. It went out to the Western Front on 26 March 1916 armed with four 8-inch howitzers (Note: At this stage of the war the 8-inch howitzers in use (Marks I–V) were improvised from cut-down and bored-out barrels of 6-inch coast defence guns, with the recoil checked by enormous wooden wedges.) and joined the Northern Heavy Group (40th Heavy Artillery Group or HAG) in X Corps. This Corps was part of Fourth Army preparing for that summer's 'Big Push' (the Battle of the Somme).

==== Somme ====
The role of the northern division of X Corps, the 36th (Ulster) Division, was to attack astride the River Ancre and capture the Schwaben Redoubt on the edge of the Thiepval Ridge. The bombardment programme was to extend over five days, U, V, W, X and Y, before the assault was launched on Z day. The bombardment began on 24 June, but on several days the weather was too bad for good air or ground observation and the programme was extended by two days (Y1 and Y2). When the infantry launched their assault at 07.30 on Z Day (1 July) the heavy guns lifted to successive targets, repeating the process six times. On 36th Division's front the initial assault was entirely successful, except for the area immediately adjacent to the Ancre. The Ulstermen overran the German front line trenches and dugouts, and by 08.00 they had captured the front face of the Schwaben Redoubt. Although some parties got into the German 2nd Position, the divisions on either flank had met with disaster, allowing the defenders to get into their rear. Most of the 36th Division was pinned down in the open and had to be withdrawn after dark. The gunners helped to evacuate the wounded, a process that was not completed until 3 July.

By now, massive quantities of artillery were employed for each phase of the continuing offensive as Fourth Army and later Reserve Army attacked again and again:

- Battle of Bazentin Ridge (14 July)
- Capture of Ovillers (17 July)
- Battle of Pozières (23 July)
- Battle of Flers-Courcelette (15–22 September)
- Battle of Thiepval Ridge (26–28 September)

On 3 October, 70th Siege Bty was transferred to 16th HAG with Reserve (later Fifth) Army, which continued to attack on the Ancre Heights until mid-November, and carried out minor operations on the Ancre through the winter.

==== Vimy ====
On 22 March 1917, 70th Siege Bty was transferred north to join 31st HAG with First Army, which was preparing for the Battle of Vimy Ridge. The artillery plan for the heavy guns emphasised counter-battery (CB) fire. At Zero hour, while the field guns laid down a Creeping barrage to protect the advancing infantry, the heavy howitzers fired 450 yards (410 m) further ahead to hit the rear areas on the reverse slope of the ridge, especially known gun positions. The attack went in on 9 April with I Corps and Canadian Corps successfully capturing Vimy Ridge. Fighting in the southern sector (the Battle of Arras) continued into May.

On 29 May, 70th Siege Bty was joined by a section from the newly-arrived 310th Siege Bty, bringing it up to a strength of six 8-inch howitzers. It came under the command of a number of different HAGs, finally joining 12th HAG with Third Army on 7 September.

==== Cambrai ====
In October, Third Army began preparing for its surprise attack with tanks at the Battle of Cambrai. There was to be no preliminary bombardment or registration: when the battle began with a crash of artillery at 06.20 on 20 November the German defenders were stunned, and the massed tanks completed their overcome. In most areas the attack was an outstanding success. Exploitation over succeeding days was less spectacular.

By now, HAG allocations were becoming more fixed, and on 1 February 1918 they were converted into permanent RGA brigades. Because of the inclusion of 70th Siege Bty, the 12th Brigade was defined as an 8-inch Howitzer Brigade, though the other three batteries were all equipped with 6-inch howitzers. 70th Siege Bty remained with this brigade until the Armistice.

==== 1918 ====
12th Brigade was part of IX Corps' Heavy Artillery in the fighting at Mont Kemmel, during the Battle of the Lys (the second phase of the German spring offensive) in April 1918. It then moved to Fourth Amy on 18 August 1918 in time for the Battle of Amiens and to participate in the victorious Hundred Days Offensive.

By the end of September, Fourth Army had closed up to the Hindenburg Line. 12th Brigade came under the command of IX Corps once more for the assault crossing of the St Quentin Canal on 29 September. The canal defences were largely destroyed by the heavy guns, which continued firing on the canal banks until the last possible moment as 137th (Staffordshire) Brigade stormed the outpost line and then scrambled across the canal in the morning mist. 70th Siege Bty crossed the canal on 1 October to support 32nd Division's attack on the Beaurevoir Line.

For the next attack, the Battle of the Selle, IX Corps HQ selected important localities to be bombarded by 70th Siege Bty's heavy howitzers, for which 200 rounds of ammunition per gun were accumulated. The corps attacked on 17 October, 'lifted forward' by two great belts of intense artillery fire, and a German counter-attack was hit by every gun within range. IX Corps renewed its advance on 23 October, with 12th Bde part of a massive corps artillery reserve. The attack went in at 01.20 in moonlight, after the heavy guns had done the usual CB and harassing fire bombardments, and the results were extremely satisfactory. After a pause to regroup and reconnoitre, IX Corps stormed across the Sambre–Oise Canal on 4 November (the Battle of the Sambre). After that the campaign became a pursuit of a beaten enemy, in which the slow-moving siege guns could play no part. The war ended with the Armistice with Germany on 11 November. 70th Siege Battery was disbanded in 1919.

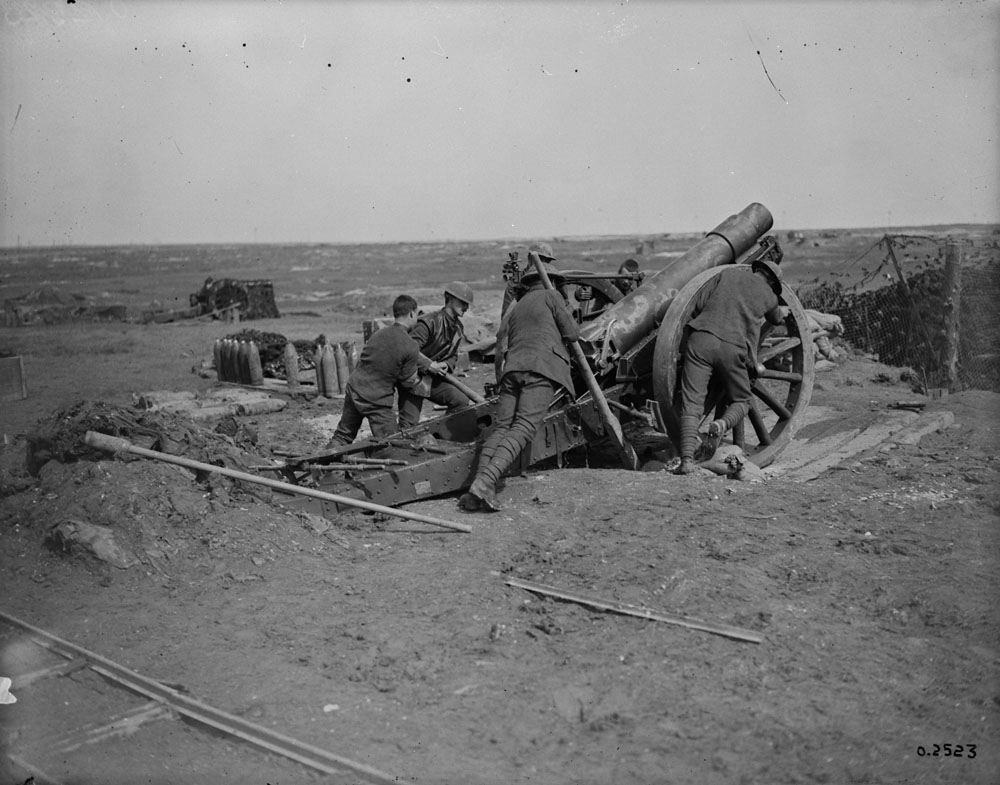
Crew positioning a 6-inch 26 cwt howitzer in 1918.

=== 108th Siege Battery, RGA ===
108th Siege Battery was formed in the Forth Defences under Army Council Instruction No 397 of 21 February 1916 with a cadre of three officers and 78 men from the Forth RGA. It went out to the Western Front on 7 June armed with four 6-inch howitzers and also joined 40th HAG in X Corps' Heavy Artillery. It had a similar experience to 70th Siege Bty in the Somme Offensive, although it transferred to 45th HAG on 21 July. For the Capture of Pozières on 23 July, 45th HAG was directly attached to 1st Australian Division. A methodical bombardment of the village began on 19 July, the volume of fire increasing after dark on 22 July. Just before Zero hour (00.30 on 23 July) the heavy artillery provided five minutes of intense bombardment of the western part of the village between the Bapaume road and the cemetery. The Australian battalions attacking the village encountered little resistance and reached their objective before daybreak, though there was bitter fighting elsewhere.

108th Siege Bty moved to 59th HAG on 29 September, then began a series of rapid changes in command, to 76th HAG with First Army on 23 December, to 50th HAG with Third Army on 26 January 1917, 31st HAG with First Army two days later, then to 53rd HAG on 5 February and 79th HAG on 18 February, joining 87th HAG with Third Army on 26 March before the Battle of Arras. Then it was with 76th HAG, First Army, from 30 April, and back to 50th HAG, Third Army, on 14 May. It remained with 50th HAG during the summer, being rested from 23 August to 7 September. On 25 September 1917, 108th Siege Bty was made up to six howitzers when it was joined by a section from the newly arrived 441st Siege Bty. (Note: 441st Siege Battery, RGA, was formed on 23 May 1917 at Aldershot. It went out to the Western Front on 17 September 1917. On arrival it was armed with 6 x BL 6-inch 26 cwt howitzers, and was then broken up, one section being posted to each of 88th, 108th and 110th Siege Btys.)

The battery was briefly assigned to 16th HAG, First Army, on 6 November, but two days later it left to return to 50th HAG with Third Army (a move that took until 12 November) for the Battle of Cambrai. The group fired in support of III Corps' attack. The attack on this front was a complete success, and the German artillery was largely neutralised by the bombardment (later analysis showed that enemy gun positions had been fixed with 90 per cent accuracy). However, further exploitation was slow, and the fighting bogged down round Bourlon Wood. On 30 November, the Germans launched a heavy counter-attack. 108th Siege Bty's guns were sited at Sonnet Farm, alongside 110th Siege Bty (formed by the Clyde RGA at the same time as the 108th). The German barrage on the battery positions lasted half an hour and although 110th Siege Bty managed to get two howitzers into action, the retreating British infantry had passed the batteries' position, and about noon the Germans came over the crest of Gonnelieu Ridge. The gunners removed the dial sights before abandoning their howitzers and those armed with rifles took up a position about 300 yards back. Here, they were joined by troops from 60th Infantry Brigade, who held the German advance. 108th Siege Bty had lost five of its howitzers.

After this action, the battery moved to 86th HAG and was re-equipped, but reduced to an establishment of four guns; a section of gunners left on 24 December to join 288th Siege Bty, an 8-inch howitzer unit that had been broken up and was being reconstituted with 6-inch howitzers. 108th Siege Bty was attached to 17th HAG on 27 December, then moved to 78th HAG two days later. This was its final transfer, and it served with 78th HAG (78th Bde RGA from 1 February 1918) until the Armistice.

78th Brigade served with Third Army during the German Spring Offensive, then transferred to Second Army on 7 July. Second Army joined in the Allied Hundred Days Offensive on 18 August, advancing in Flanders. On 26 and 30 August, during the Battle of the Scarpe, 78th Bde supported the Canadian Corps, with the heavy guns firing 600 yards (550 m) ahead of the creeping barrage. For the Canadian attack on the Drocourt-Quéant Switch Line (2 September), the brigade directly supported the attacking divisions while other RGA brigades handled CB tasks.

On 2 October, 78th Bde transferred to First Army, supporting XXII Corps at the Battle of the Selle (24 October), after which the pursuit was too fast for most of the heavy artillery to keep up.

The fighting was ended by the Armistice of 11 November 1918 and demobilisation began shortly afterwards. In the interim order of battle for the postwar army, the battery was supposed to form 148th Bty in XXXVII Brigade, RGA, but this was rescinded after the signing of the Treaty of Versailles, and the remaining cadre of the battery was disbanded in 1919.

=== 178th Siege Battery, RGA ===
178th Siege Battery was formed on 23 June 1916 in the Forth Garrison under War Office Instruction No 1037 of 30 June 1916. A cadre of 50–60 volunteers was obtained for the battery from the Forth RGA and together with recruits from the depots it assembled at King's Park, Edinburgh, between 3 and 5 July. The battery maintained a largely Scottish character, and was always preceded by a piper on the march. Equipped with 6-inch howitzers it went out to the Western Front on 8 October and joined Third Army on the Arras front, frequently switching between that army's HAGs. It took part in the Battle of Arras, moving up during the first day's fighting (9 April) to keep the enemy in range. After the initial successes, the battle developed into a long series of attacks with decreasing success.

The battery was then transferred to 77th HAG in Fifth Army (and later 42nd HAG under Second Army) for the Third Ypres Offensive, from 31 July until it was relieved on 14 October, having suffered heavily from enemy CB fire and Mustard gas shelling. Afterwards it returned to Third Army and moved south through various quiet sectors until it joined 17th HAG for the Battle of Cambrai. It was heavily engaged in the fighting for Bourlon Wood when the Germans counter-attacked the Flesquières Salient.

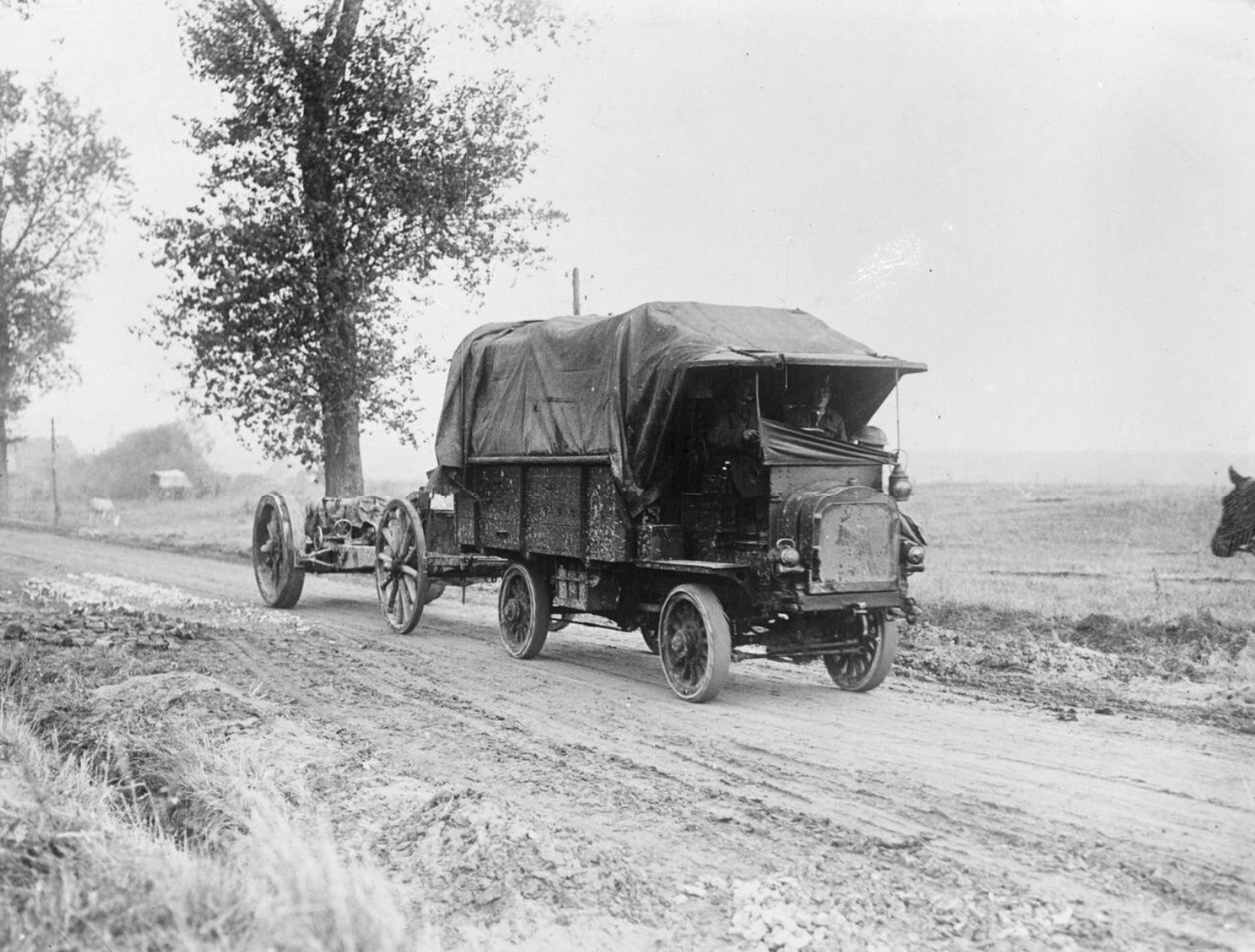
FWD Model B lorry towing a 6-inch 26 cwt howitzer.

In the winter of 1917–18, the battery became part of 89th HAG (later Brigade). It was back in the Flesquières Salient, enduring German Mustard gas shelling, when the German Spring Offensive broke on 21 March 1918. It suffered heavy shelling and air attack, being forced to abandon its guns temporarily, but was able to withdraw when Third Army fell back from the dangerous salient.

After the 'Great Retreat', 178th Siege Bty spent the next four months in front of Albert, behind the Ancre, which was the limit of the German advance. For the Battle of Amiens it fired across the Ancre to support III Corps, then on 22 August (the Battle of Albert) 89th Bde assisted 18th (Eastern) Division across the Ancre to recapture Albert. The battery's FWD Model B gun tractors and lorries proved useful in the subsequent pursuit to the Hindenburg Line. It fired in support of III Corps' flanking operations during the Battle of the St Quentin Canal, and joined XIII Corps for the Second Battle of Cambrai (8 October). 89th Brigade then moved north to join Fifth Army and the battery was not engaged again before the Armistice.

In the interim order of battle for the postwar army, the battery was supposed to form 155th Bty in XXXIX Brigade, RGA, but this was rescinded after the Treaty of Versailles and the remaining cadre of the battery was disbanded in 1919.

== Interwar ==
The Forth RGA was reformed on 1 July 1920 with three batteries (later numberd 160, 161 and 162) from Nos 1–4 Companies and one (later 163) from Nos 5 and 6 Companies. When the TF was reorganised as the Territorial Army (TA) in 1921, the title was changed to Forth Coast Brigade, RGA, and when the RGA was subsumed into the Royal Artillery in 1924 it became the Forth Heavy Brigade, RA. It formed part of the coast defence troops in 52nd (Lowland) Divisional Area and had the following organisation:

- HQ at Easter Road Barracks, Edinburgh
- 160 Heavy Battery at Easter Road Barracks
- 161 Heavy Battery at Easter Road Barracks
- 162 Heavy Battery at Easter Road Barracks
- 163 Heavy Battery at Hunter Street Drill Hall, Kirkcaldy

In 1926, it was decided that the coast defences of the UK would be manned by the TA alone. A 1927 report on coastal defences by the Committee of Imperial Defence made recommendations for defence schemes at 15 'Class A' home ports, including the Forth (Scheme 7), but little was done to modernise them before the outbreak of World War II.

On 1 April 1934, 160 Hvy Bty was converted to the medium artillery role and transferred to 62nd (North Scottish) Medium Brigade, which had been converted from the North Scottish RGA at Broughty Ferry. The battery rejoined Forth Heavy Regiment (as RA brigades were now termed) on 1 November 1938 and reconverted to the coast artillery role.

== World War II ==
=== Mobilisation ===
The TA was doubled in size following the Munich Crisis. In May 1939, 163 Bty was transferred to join a new Fife Heavy Regiment (later 504th and 507th (Fife) Coast Rgts) on the north bank of the Forth, formed from 62nd (North Scottish) Medium Rgt. The Forth Heavy Rgt mobilised in the Lowland Area of Scottish Command on the outbreak of war in September 1939, manning the following guns in the Forth defences:

- 3 × 9.2-inch
- 12 × 6-inch
- 4 × 12-pdr QF

The coastal artillery regiments underwent a major reorganisation in 1940, and on 14 July the regiment expanded to form five new regiments:

=== 501st (Forth) Coast Regiment ===
Formed on 14 July 1940, became part of Cromarty Fire Command on 7 December 1942. During the war it had the following composition:

- Regimental HQ at Fort South Sutor, Cromarty
- A Bty – 241 Bty at North Sutor from 1 April 1941; to 542nd Coast Rgt at Torry Battery 4 September 1942
- B Bty – 242 Bty at South Sutor from 1 April 1941; to 543rd Coast Rgt at Broughty Ferry 1 April 1942, formally on 4 September 1942
- 303 Bty – formed 10 June 1940 at Wick, Caithness; joined 31 December 1940; to 543rd Coast Rgt 6 March 1942
- 304 Bty – formed 10 June 1940 at Nigg, Cromarty; joined 31 December 1940; to 542nd Coast Rgt 7 March 1942
- 382 Bty – formed 1 August 1940; joined 31 December 1940; to 25th Coast Artillery Group (later 564th Coast Rgt) in Iceland 25 March 1941
- 211 Bty – formed as a 6-inch battery by 72nd Coast Training Rgt at Norton Camp, Yarmouth, Isle of Wight, from a cadre provided by Scottish Command; joined 8 March 1941
- 227 Independent Bty –formed at Lossiemouth with 2 × 6-inch guns and 2 × searchlights 7 March 1941; regimented 10 May 1941
- 244 Bty – from 543rd Coast Rgt 6 March 1942; placed in suspended animation 1 April 1944
- 306 Bty – from 542nd Coast Rgt 7 March 1942
- 243 Bty – from 542nd Coast Rgt 4 September 1942
- 154 Independent Bty – joined 1 April 1944
- 82 Coast Observer Detachment – joined by April 1942

RHQ, 154 and 243 Btys were placed in suspended animation on 1 June 1945, when 211, 227, 306 and 307 Btys were disbanded.

=== 502nd (Forth) Coast Regiment ===
Formed on 14 July 1940 and placed in suspended animation 11 March 1941.

- RHQ at Aberdeen
- A Bty at Torry Battery – 243 Bty from 1941; to 2nd Coast Artillery Group (later 542nd Coast Rgt) on 22 October 1940

=== 503rd (Forth) Coast Regiment ===
Formed on 14 July 1940, mainly from 161 Heavy Bty, and placed in suspended animation 11 March 1941.

- RHQ at Dundee
- A Bty – became 244 Bty 11 March 1941; to 3rd Coast Artillery Group (later 543rd Coast Rgt) 1 April 1941

=== 505th (Forth) Coast Regiment ===
Formed on 14 July 1940, mainly from 162 Heavy Bty; became part of Inchkeith Fire Command on 7 December 1942.

- RHQ at Inchkeith
- A Bty – 251 Bty at Inchkeith from 1 April 1941
- B Bty – 252 Bty at Inchkeith North from 1 April 1941; Kinghorn by 16 January 1942; to 506th (Forth) Coast Rgt by April 1942
- C Bty – 253 Bty from 1 April 1941
- D Bty – 254 Bty from 1 April 1941
- E Bty – 255 Bty from 1 April 1941
- 309 Coast Defence Bty – formed 10 June 1940, incorporated as 309 Bty at Fidra on 31 December 1940; to 506th (Forth) Coast Rgt on 12 January 1942; returned 1 June 1945
- 310 Bty – formed 10 June 1940, at Leith Fort by 14 December, incorporated at North Berwick on 31 December 1940; to 510th (Tynemouth) Coast Rgt on 3 November 1941
- 257 Bty – from 506th (Forth) Coast Rgt on 12 January 1942; became independent on 20 August 1942
- 252 Bty – from 506th (Forth) Coast Rgt on 6 January 1942
- 256 Bty – from 506th (Forth) Coast Rgt on 6 January 1942
- 436 Bty – formed 28 August 1942 at Fidra; disbanded 1 June 1945
- 245, 247, 248, 250 Btys – joined from disbanding 504th (Fife) Coast Rgt on 1 April 1944
- 152, 308 Btys – joined from 538th (Clyde) Coast Rgt on 1 June 1945

After VE Day, 247, 250, 251 and 254 Btys passed into suspended animation on 1 June 1945. Then, RHQ and 152, 245, 248, 253, 255, 256, 308 and 309 Btys were placed in suspended animation between 10 and 31 January 1946.

=== 506th (Forth) Coast Regiment ===
Formed on 14 July 1940, mainly from 163 Heavy Bty; became part of Kinghorn Fire Command on 7 December 1942:

- RHQ at Kinghorn
- A Bty – 256 Bty from 1 April 1941; to 505th (Forth) Coast Rgt on 16 January 1942
- B Bty – 257 Bty from 1 April 1941; to 505th (Forth) Coast Rgt on 12 January 1942
- 309 Bty – from 505th (Forth) Coast Rgt on 12 January 1942
- 252 Bty – from 505th (Forth) Coast Rgt on 16 January 1942
- 258 Bty and Fire Command HQ – formed from disbanding 507th Coast Rgt on 15 May 1942

RHQ was placed in suspended animation on 1 April 1944, after which 309 Bty rejoined 505th (Forth) Coast Rgt and 252 and 258 Btys passed into suspended animation on 1 June 1945.

=== Defences ===
At their height, in September 1941, the East Coast defences of Scotland contained the following guns:

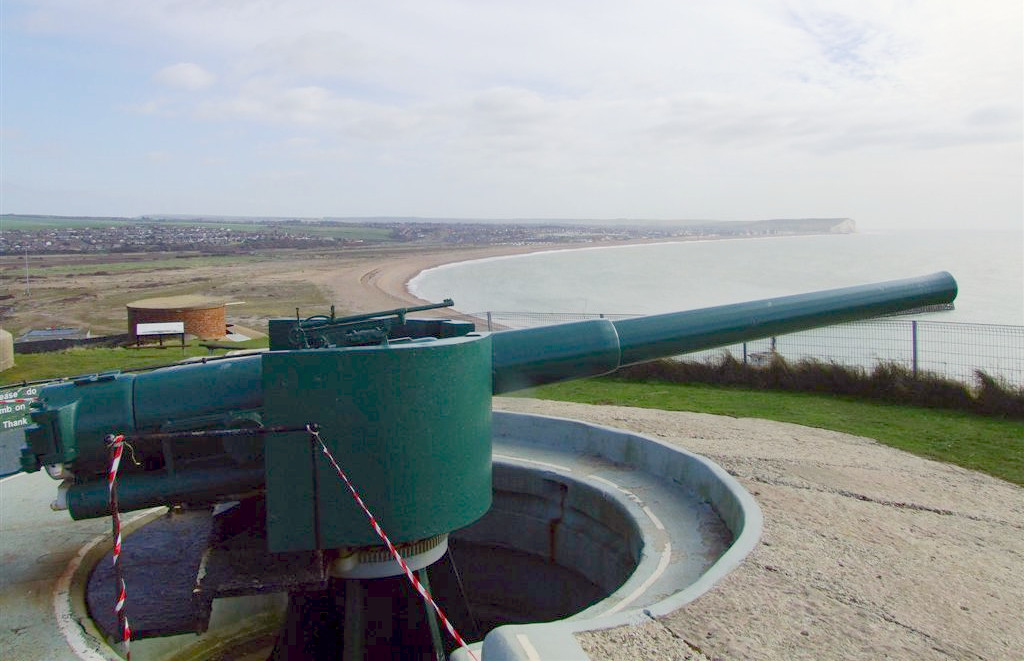
BL 6-inch Mk VII naval gun in typical coast defence mounting (preserved at Newhaven Fort).

- Forth (504th (Fife), 505th (Forth), 506th (Forth), 507th (Fife) Coast Rgts)
  - 3 × 9.2-inch
  - 16 × 6-inch
  - 4 × 12-pounders
  - 6 × 6-pounders
- Dundee (503rd Coast Rgt)
  - 4 × 6-inch
- Aberdeen (502nd Coast Rgt)
  - 4 × 6-inch
- Invergordon (501st Coast Rgt)
  - 6 × 6-inch

There were also emergency batteries of 6-inch guns of various marks installed in 1940 at Montrose, Peterhead, Stannergate (Dundee), Girdleness (Aberdeen) and Nigg (Cromarty).

Unlike the anti-aircraft defences of the Forth, these units and batteries saw no action. As the invasion threat receded, the coast defences were seen as absorbing excessive manpower and were scaled back, the gunners being redeployed. The surplus TA coast regiments were placed in suspended animation.

== Postwar ==
When the TA was constituted on 1 January 1947, 502nd and 506th (Forth) Coast Rgts were formally disbanded and the following units were reformed in 105 Coast Artillery Brigade based in Edinburgh:

- 412 (Highland) Coast Rgt at Alness, Cromarty, from 501st (Forth) Coast Rgt
- 413 (Fife) Coast Rgt at Kirkcaldy from 503rd (Forth) Coast Rgt
- 414 (Forth) Coast Rgt at Edinburgh from 505th (Forth) Coast Regt

However, it was later decided to reduce the number of TA coast regiments and, on 1 October 1953, 413 (Fife) and 414 (Forth) Rgts were amalgamated to form 413 (Mixed) Coast Rgt at Kirkcaldy ('Mixed' indicating that members of the Women's Royal Army Corps were integrated into the unit); at the same time, 412 (Highland) Coast Rgt also became Mixed.

The Coast Artillery branch of the RA was abolished in 1956. 412 (Highland) Coast Rgt was absorbed into 540th (Lovat Scouts) Light Anti-Aircraft Rgt, to which 412th contributed part of Q (Ross) Bty at Alness and Tain; 413th (Mixed) Coast Rgt was absorbed into the Edinburgh-based 433rd Light Anti-Aircraft Rgt, to which it contributed a battery while part was converted into an additional field squadron of 124 Field Engineer Rgt, Royal Engineers. When the TA was further reduced in 1961, B Troop of 540th LAA Rgt at Alness and Tain was amalgamated with 11th Battalion, Seaforth Highlanders, and 433rd LAA Rgt was transferred to the Royal Army Service Corps as 433 (Forth)Transport Column.

== Honorary Colonels ==
The following served as Honorary Colonel of the unit:

- Sir Lewis McIver, 1st Baronet, originally appointed 2 December 1896 as Hon Col of the Edinburgh City Artillery
- Sir Patrick Ford, 1st Baronet, appointed 26 June 1926, retired 1935
- Maj Sir Thomas Clark, 3rd Baronet, appointed 5 November 1938, continued with 414th (Forth) Coast Rgt until 1949

== Memorials ==
There is a bronze plaque in St Giles' Cathedral, Edinburgh, as a memorial to the 124 men of the Forth RGA who died in World War I. After World War II an additional panel was added with seven further names who died in that conflict.

There is also a World War I plaque to the Forth RGA with 126 names at the Army Reserve Centre in Kirkcaldy, Fife.
