= Ecce Homo (Murillo) =

Painting by Bartolomé Esteban Murillo

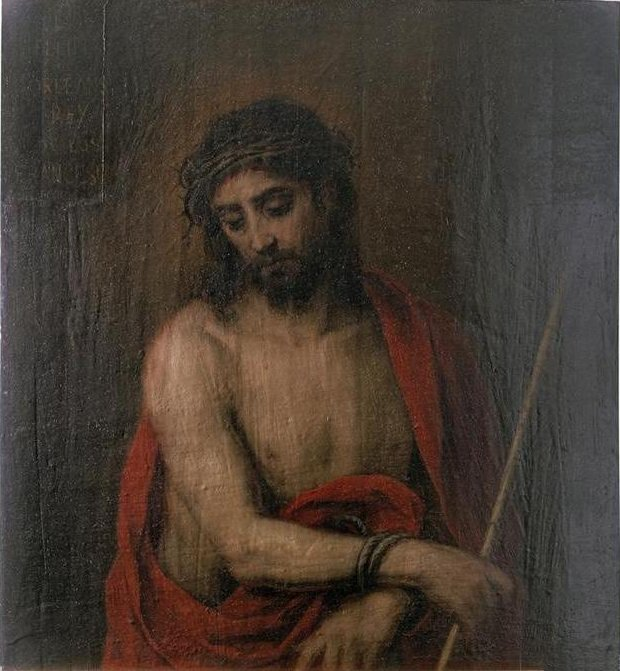
Ecce Homo (c. 1672-1678) by Bartolomé Esteban Murillo

Ecce Homo is an oil on panel painting of the Ecce Homo motif by Bartolomé Esteban Murillo, created c. 1672-1678, originally commissioned for Seville Cathedral and now held in the El Paso Museum of Art.

It is recorded in the Cathedral's Virgen del Pilar chapel in 1838 and was acquired later that century by Louis Philippe I, King of the French, then by John Campbell. It remained in the United Kingdom until being bought in 1955 by Samuel H. Kress, who donated it to its present home in 1961.
