= 110th Siege Battery, Royal Garrison Artillery =

Artillery unit of the British Army in World War I

110th Siege Battery, RGA
- Cap Badge of the Royal Regiment of Artillery
- Active: 26 February 1916–1919
- Country: United Kingdom
- Branch: British Army
- Role: Siege artillery
- Part of: Royal Garrison Artillery
- Garrison/HQ: Port Glasgow
- Equipment: 220mm Mortar Model 1880; BL 6-inch 26 cwt howitzer
- Engagements: Battle of the Somme; Battle of Cambrai; German spring offensive Hundred Days Offensive

Insignia
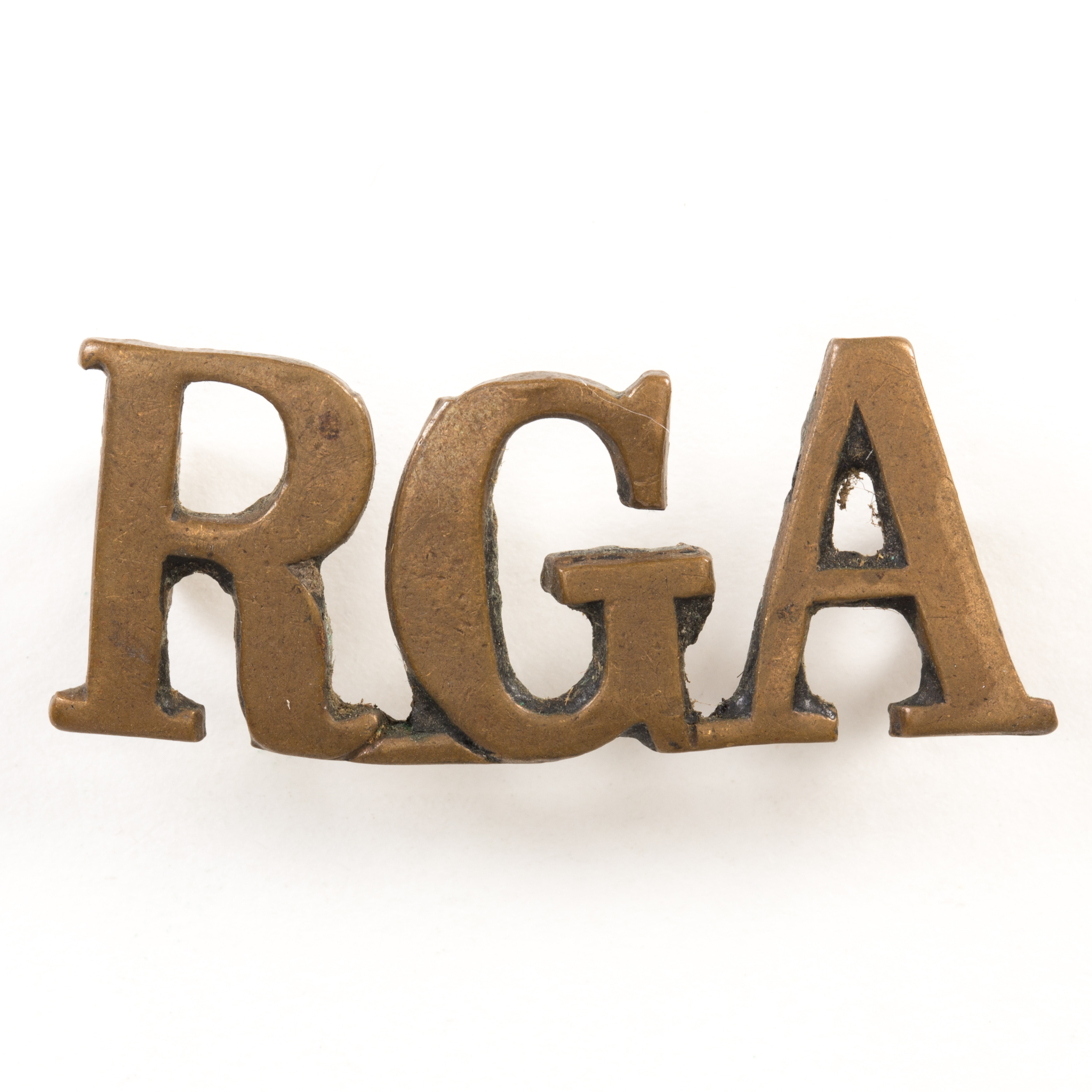
- Shoulder title

110th Siege Battery was a heavy howitzer unit of the Royal Garrison Artillery (RGA) formed during World War I. It saw active service on the Western Front at the Somme and Cambrai, against the German spring offensive, and in the final Hundred Days Offensive.

== Mobilisation ==
On the outbreak of war on 4 August 1914 the part-time Territorial Force (TF) was mobilised at its war stations, including the Clyde Royal Garrison Artillery, a coast defence unit at Port Glasgow on the Firth of Clyde. Shortly afterwards TF units were invited to volunteer for Overseas Service and on 15 August the War Office (WO) issued instructions to separate those men who had signed up for Home Service only, and form these into reserve units. On 31 August, the formation of a reserve or 2nd Line unit was authorised for each 1st Line unit where 60 per cent or more of the men had volunteered for Overseas Service. The titles of these 2nd Line units would be the same as the original, but distinguished by a '2/' prefix. In this way duplicate companies and batteries were created, releasing the 1st Line units to be sent overseas.

By October 1914, the campaign on the Western Front was bogging down into Trench warfare and there was an urgent need for batteries of Siege artillery to be sent to France. The WO decided that the TF coastal gunners were well enough trained to take over many of the duties in the coastal defences, releasing Regular RGA gunners for service in the field, and 1st line RGA companies that had volunteered for overseas service had been authorised to increase their strength by 50 per cent.

During 1915 the WO began to form new RGA siege batteries based on cadres from TF coast defence units. 110th Siege Battery was formed at Sheerness on the Thames Estuary on 26 February 1916 under Army Council Instruction 397, which called for a cadre of three officers and 78 other ranks to be supplied by the Clyde RGA. In fact it was manned by three officers and 93 other ranks from the Clyde RGA (almost certainly 1/1st Company from Port Glasgow), together with two officers and 54 men drawn from the Thames and Medway Defences. The first Officer Commanding (OC) was Major P. Rashleigh. Training continued at Lydd Camp from 17 March.

== Service ==
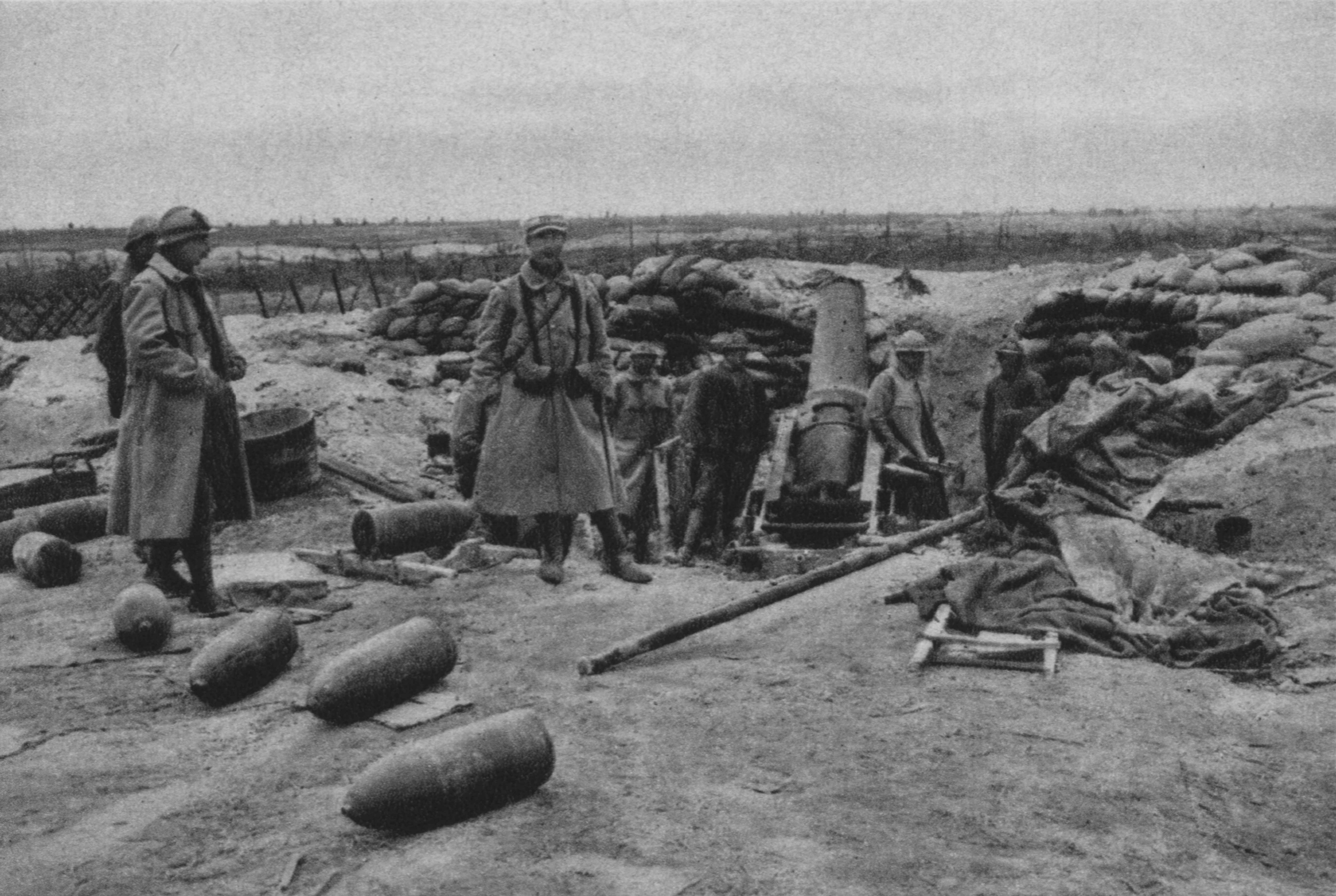
220 mm Heavy mortar in action with the French Army.

The personnel of the battery went out to the Western Front on 17 May 1916 and reached Hesdin by 21 May. On 26 May they took over four old French 220mm 'Mortiers' – 1880 model heavy mortars employed as siege artillery – which they loaded onto lorries while the men travelled by motor bus to Beaufort.

The battery took over two more 220 mm mortars from the French and provided a detachment to a 'provisional battery' of the RGA manning some old French 120 mm long guns. The battery then moved to Arras where it was assigned to VI Corps' heavy artillery.

At this time batteries were switched between Heavy Artillery Groups (HAGs) as required. From 30 May to 4 June the 110th Siege Bty was with 19th HAG, then returned to VI Corps as an unassigned battery. On 4 July it moved to La Houssoye, where Nos 1 and 3 Sections fired the battery's first rounds from a position at Bécourt on 7 July.

=== Somme ===
Two days later the battery joined 31st HAG and moved to a new position behind the Carnoy Valley, the scene of recent heavy fighting in the opening stages of the Battle of the Somme. After completing its gun positions and firing calibration shots, it began a slow bombardment of enemy trenches at a range of 4600 metres from 12 to 15 July. Then it bombarded the villages of Ginchy and Guillemont but found that the mortar platforms on baulks of timber were already beginning to break up under the constant firing. This work continued through July, broken by an intense bombardment of enemy gun batteries in Maricourt on 22 July. On that day Maj Rashleigh was wounded by an enemy shell when he was near the battery's observation post (OP). Captain Hugh Campbell took temporary command and was later confirmed as OC and promoted to Major.

By now the old mortars were showing signs of wear: at the end of July only one was fit to fire. The battery transferred to the command of 28th HAG on 31 July and the following day it handed over its mortars to 41st French Bty. It spent August near Bronfay Farm without guns, providing fatigue parties and detachments attached to other batteries. On 1 September it was armed with four modern 6-inch howitzers, and these were in position near Arrowhead Copse by 8 September.

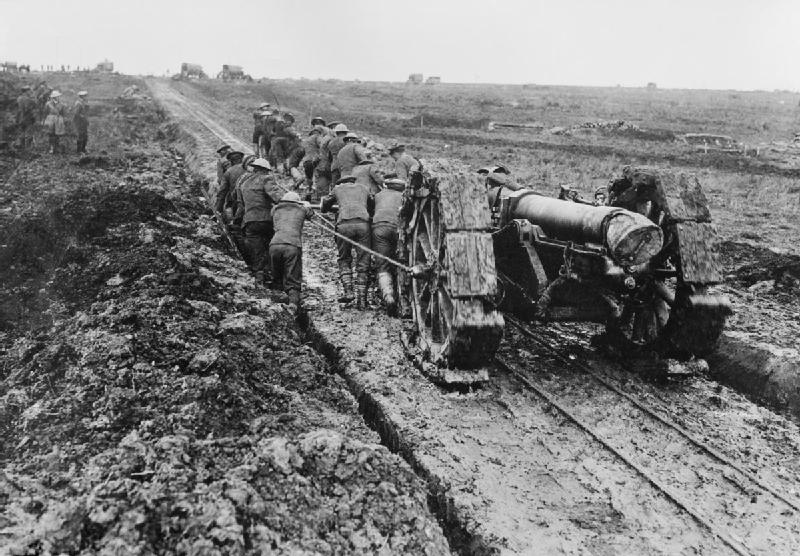
6-inch howitzer being moved through mud in September 1916.

By now massive quantities of artillery were employed for each phase of the continuing Somme offensive as Fourth Army attacked again and again. With its new howitzers 110th Siege Bty carried out counter-battery (CB) fire in preparation for the Battle of Flers-Courcelette (15–23 September), and received a certain amount of retaliatory fire. On 23 September it was heavily shelled from 09.30 to 15.00, the fire being directed by hostile aircraft, and the battery lost two men killed and 15 wounded as well as loss of ammunition. The guns were withdrawn to a new position at 18.00 and were back in action on 25 September.

During the Battle of Morval (25–28 September) the battery fired on the villages of Morval and Le Transloy as well as continuing its CB work. Having neutralised enemy batteries, the tactics were to give them another five minutes of intense fire every 12 hours. The battery then moved to near Trônes Wood and during the Battle of Le Transloy (1–18 October) it fired on the village and on enemy trenches. As the British slowly advanced, the battery moved up to new positions near Leuze Wood on 24 October. Here it suffered a number of casualties from hostile artillery fire. The Somme offensive was winding down, but 110th Siege Bty had periods of intense activity on 5 and 13 November supporting yet more attacks on Le Transloy, as well as more CB tasks.

=== Winter 1916–17 ===
At the end of November the battery handed over its guns and stores at Leuze Wood to 4th Siege Bty and took over those of 199th Siege Bty at Le Foret on 1 December, the battery transferring to the command of 21st HAG on 10 December. The battery supported the minor Operations on the Ancre, January–March 1917, by shelling Fritz Trench and Pallas Trench. The relative quiet along the front was broken in mid-March when the German Army began its retreat to the Hindenburg Line (Operation Alberich). This entailed much work for the siege gunners in moving their guns over the devastated Somme battlefields to get back into range of the enemy. 110th Siege Bty moved up by sections to Nurlu, Sorel-le-Grand, and then Heudicourt by 8 April, from where it spent several weeks shelling Villers-Guislain, Villers-Plouich, Gouzeaucourt and Gonnelieu in front of the main Hindenburg positions, before finally moving up to Gouzeaucourt on 7 May. From here it fired almost daily 'destructive' or 'neutralising' tasks against enemy gun positions. (Note: 110th Siege Battery's War Diary for March 1917 is missing because, as the OC reported, all its records were destroyed when a dugout was blown in by enemy shellfire.)

=== Summer 1917 ===
In June 1917 Fourth Army HQ moved to the Flanders coast to join in a break-out from the Ypres Salient that never happened. 21st HAG was then taken over by Third Army and 110th Siege Bty remained with it, then was attached to 89th HAG (2 June–10 July). On 13 July it was transferred to 67th HAG with First Army, involving a long move north. 110th Siege Bty pulled out of Gouzeaucourt on 9 July and moved by road by Ervillers, Tilloy and Nœux-les-Mines, arriving at Annequin on 14 July, where it prepared gun positions and moved the howitzers in on 16 July.

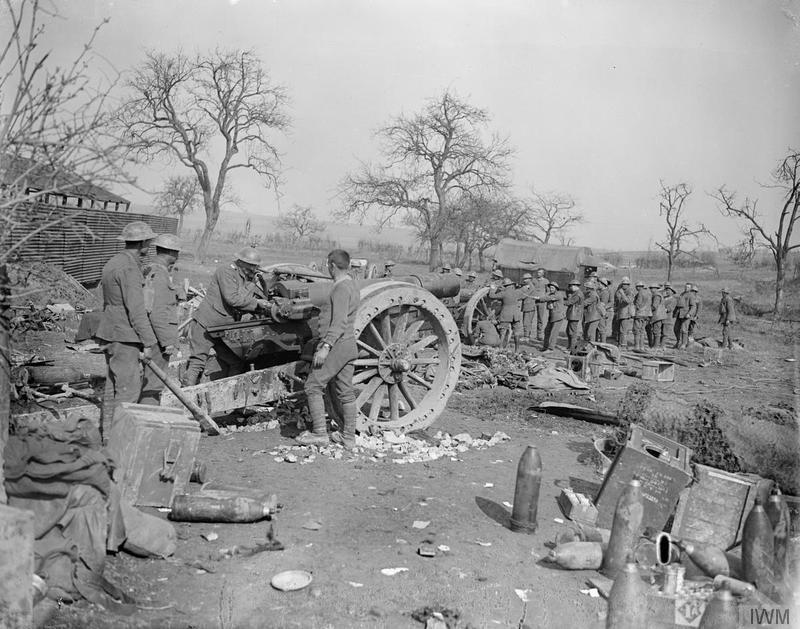
RGA gunners checking the breech of a 6-inch howitzer.

First Army's front was relatively quiet during 1917, apart from some diversionary operations in support of Fifth Army's Third Ypres Offensive. On the opening day of the battle, 1 August, 110th Siege Bty fired 500 rounds to cut barbed wire for a trench raid by troops from First Army. A few days later it carried out a series of 30-round shoots against a series of enemy trench mortar and machine gun positions, obtaining a number of direct hits. The rest of the summer and autumn was spent in similar work, CB shoots alternating with wire cutting. On 15 August the battery fired a series of salvoes to disperse groups of enemy infantry who were massing for an attack, while on 1 October the battery was subjected to over an hour's bombardment with high explosive, gas and shrapnel shells, suffering no casualties or material loss.

On 22 September 1917 110th Siege Bty was joined by a section (1 officer and 56 other ranks) from the newly-arrived 441st Siege Bty and was made up to a strength of six howitzers. (Note: 441st Siege Battery, RGA, was formed on 23 May 1917 at Aldershot. It went out to the Western Front on 17 September 1917. On arrival it was armed with 6 x 6-inch 26 cwt howitzers, and was then broken up, one section being posted to each of 88th, 108th and 110th Siege Btys.)

=== Cambrai ===
On 6 November the battery was reassigned to 21st HAG with Third Army, and moved out of its positions to make the three-day road journey via Béthune, Arras and Bapaume to Aizecourt-le-Haut. Third Army was preparing for its surprise attack with tanks at the Battle of Cambrai. There was to be no preliminary bombardment or registration, and the guns were to open fire at Zero hour firing 'off the map' at carefully surveyed targets. Working parties from the battery prepared positions at Gouzeaucourt, but the guns stayed silent.

The battle began with a crash of artillery at 06.20 on 20 November. 110th Siege Bty was employed in the Creeping barrage that preceded the advance of the tanks and infantry, firing 280 rounds until the barrage crept beyond the range of its howitzers at 08.55. The battery then fired at a number of specific targets, including the villages of Banteux and Bantouzelle. The German defenders were stunned, and the massed tanks completed their overcome. In most areas the attack was an outstanding success. At 23.00 that night, four of the battery's howitzers were moved forwards to Gonnelieu, close behind that morning's start line. Exploitation over succeeding days was less spectacular, though some bombardments were set up to help the infantry take certain villages, and CB shoots continued.

On 30 November the Germans put in a heavy counter-attack against the weakened troops in the ill-organised captured positions, which they quickly overran. 110th Siege Bty's guns were sited along the banks of the La Vacquerie–Gonnelieu road at Sonnet Farm, alongside 108th Siege Bty (formed by the Forth RGA at the same time as the 110th). They had just carried out a CB shoot at 06.15 against Vaucelles when the German barrage came down on the road. It lasted half an hour and caused a number of casualties. A dugout was caved in, burying eight men, and several others were wounded while digging them out. 110th Siege Bty managed to get two howitzers into action, firing as rapidly as they could on the main roads and tracks leading from Banteux and Bantouzelle. By now the retreating British infantry had passed the battery's position, and shortly afterwards the first German arrived, to be taken prisoner without much effort. The battery remained in action for another hour while under fire from snipers and parties of Germans who had to be dealt with by rifle fire from the gunners. About noon the Germans reached the crest of Gonnelieu Ridge. The gunners then removed the dial sights before abandoning their howitzers and those armed with rifles took up a position about 300 yards back. Here they were joined by troops from 60th Infantry Brigade who held the German advance. As well as its guns, 110th Siege Bty lost eight men killed, 14 wounded and three missing, of whom one was known to have been taken prisoner. 108th Siege Bty also lost five howitzers.

Between 1 and 6 December 110th Siege Bty was re-equipped with four guns from Fifth Army Gun Park and received reinforcements. It took up positions at Heudicourt on 7 December and on 9 December it was back in action, firing on Gonnelieu, La Vacquerie and Villers Guislain, which were all back in enemy hands.

On 21 December the battery joined 27th HAG with Fifth Army. By now HAG allocations were becoming more fixed, and on 1 February 1918 they were converted into permanent RGA brigades. 27th Brigade was defined as a Mixed Brigade, with guns and howitzers of several sizes. 110th Siege Bty remained with this brigade until the Armistice.

=== Spring Offensive ===
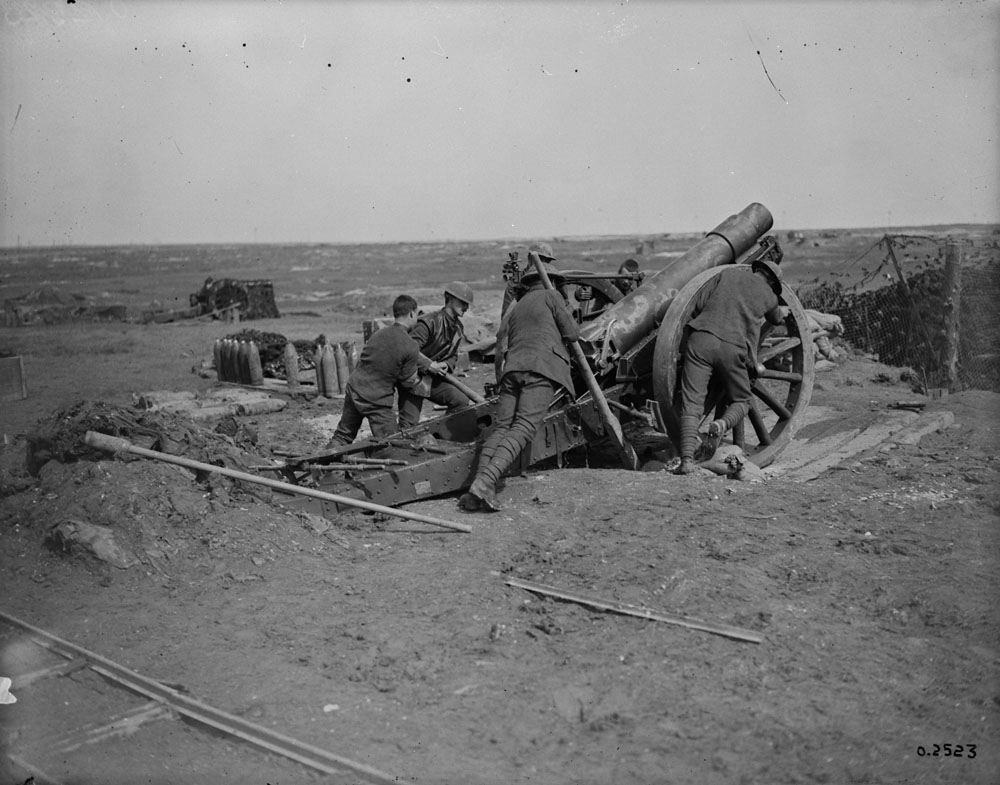
Crew positioning a 6-inch 26 cwt howitzer in February 1918.

Fifth Army was attacked on 21 March 1918, the first day of the German spring offensive. Artillery Observation Posts (OPs) were blinded by early morning mist and many were overrun along with the infantry in the forward zone. Much of the field artillery was lost, caught up in short-range fighting in the main battle zone, as were a number of RGA units either caught in the fighting or forced to abandon their guns as the Germans advanced rapidly. Others struggled to get their guns back during the 'Great Retreat'. Fourth Army HQ took over all of Fifth Army's formations and units on 2 April, and the first phase of the German offensive was halted on 4 April. Further attacks came on other parts of the front, but none broke through completely. 27th Brigade RGA officially joined Fourth Army on 1 May 1918 and remained with it until the Armistice.

=== Hundred Days ===
In late July Fourth Army began secretly massing its artillery for the Battle of Amiens, which launched the Allied Hundred Days Offensive on 8 August. Four hundred rounds of ammunition per howitzer, much of it gas shell, were dumped near the gun positions, which were occupied by night. The guns remained silent, with no prior registration, relying on 'firing by the map' at Zero hour. The main targets were enemy gun positions, which were swamped with gas. As the tanks and infantry advanced, 6-inch howitzer sections began moving up behind them. The attack was a brilliant success.

Fourth Army launched a series of attacks over succeeding weeks (the Second Battle of the Somme). By October the offensive was turning into a pursuit, and it became difficult to get the heavy guns forward. On 8 October, for example, the attack at Cambrai was so successful that Gen Sir Henry Rawlinson ordered his troops to continue the next morning beyond the planned exploitation, but it was not until 10.30 on 9 October that 27th Bde RGA (supporting XIII Corps) got some of its heavy batteries up to the starting line of the previous day's attack.

Preparations began on 11 October for the assault crossing of the River Selle. A massive fireplan was prepared, with the heavy batteries right forward so that they could reach the German line of retreat across the River Sambre. 27th Brigade (less its heaviest howitzers) was part of this concentration for XIII Corps, with 300 rounds for each 6-inch howitzer. The attack was made on 17 October, when XIII Corps bridged the flooded Selle just behind the artillery barrage, and by the end of the day was overlooking the Sambre.

Fourth Army pushed on again on 23 October. There was no preliminary bombardment: instead the 6-inch howitzers formed the front part of the creeping barrage but distributed unevenly to deal with specific sunken roads, fortified farms, strongpoints, etc. 27th Brigade supported the advance of 25th Division. The attack was made under moonlight, with Zero hour fixed for 01.20. Despite confusion caused by ground mist, 25th Division's infantry waded across the Richemont stream and followed the barrage into Pommereuil. The first and second objectives were taken despite stiff opposition from some strongpoints, until darkness halted the advance.

By now the offensive had turned into a pursuit, and many of the heavy batteries had to be left behind. Fighting was ended on 11 November by the Armistice with Germany. Demobilisation began early in 1919 In the interim order of battle for the postwar army the battery was supposed to form C/60th Bty RGA, but this was rescinded after the signing of the Treaty of Versailles, and the battery was disbanded in 1919.
