= 117th Regiment of Foot (1794) =

Infantry regiment of the British Army

The 117th Regiment of Foot was an infantry regiment of the British Army, formed on 22 August 1794 by the regimentation of independent companies. It was commanded by the Hon Frederick St John. (Note: It may have borne the unofficial subtitle of 'The Argyllshire Fencibles', possibly before being numbered.)

The regiment was disbanded in 1796. Its personnel were later formed into the Argyllshire Militia.
