= Argyll and Bute Militia =

Auxiliary unit of the British Army

Argyllshire Militia Argyll & Bute Rifles Argyll & Bute Artillery Militia West of Scotland Artillery
- Active: 1798–1909
- Country: United Kingdom
- Branch: Militia
- Role: Infantry (1798–1861); Garrison Artillery (1861–1908); Field Artillery (1908–09)
- Part of: Scottish Division, RA (1882–89); Southern Division, RA (1889–1902)
- Garrison/HQ: Campbeltown; Maryhill Barracks

Commanders
- Notable commanders: John Campbell, 7th Duke of Argyll; John Campbell, 2nd Marquess of Breadalbane

The Argyll & Bute Militia was an auxiliary military unit in the west of Scotland from 1798 to 1909, serving in Home Defence during the French Revolutionary, Napoleonic, Crimean and Second Boer Wars. Originally an infantry regiment, it was converted into artillery in 1861. It was disbanded in 1909.

== Scottish Militia ==
The universal obligation to military service in the Shire levy was long established in Scotland: all men aged from 16 to 60 were obliged to serve for a maximum of 40 days in any one year if required, and their arms and equipment were inspected at regular Wapenshaws. In time of war, they would be called out by proclamation and by riders galloping through towns and villages bearing the 'Fiery Cross'. Following the restoration of Charles II, the Scottish Parliament passed an Act in 1661, ratified in 1663, creating a militia of 20,000 infantry and 2,000 horse, available for Crown service anywhere in Scotland, England or Ireland. During Argyll's Rising in 1685, King James II & VII ordered the disarming of many of the Scottish Militia for fear that they would join the rebel duke. However, the Scottish Militia were called out in 1689 during the Glorious Revolution that overthrew James.

Following the Union in 1707, during the War of the Spanish Succession, the Parliament of Great Britain passed an Act in 1708 to re-arm the Scottish Militia. However, the Act was denied Royal assent because of fears that the new force would be disloyal (a Jacobite uprising in Scotland was expected to support the French invasion fleet that was then at sea). In the aftermath of the Jacobite Rising of 1715, a Disarming Act was passed in Scotland and although the government-supporting Major-General John Campbell of Mamore (later 4th Duke of Argyll) raised the irregular Campbell of Argyll Militia against the Jacobite Rising of 1745 (the regiment serving at the Battle of Falkirk Muir, the Skirmish of Keith, and the Battle of Culloden) there was a reluctance to leave weapons in the hands of those who might rebel.

The English Militia were conscripted by ballot, and this system was revived in 1757 during the Seven Years' War. However, there were residual fears of Jacobitism in Scotland, so rather than extend the Militia Acts to Scotland, full-time home defence regiments of 'Fencibles' were raised for the duration of the war. These soldiers were recruited in the normal way under officers commissioned by the king, unlike militiamen who were raised by ballot and commanded by local officers appointed by the Lord-lieutenant. The Duke of Argyll was commissioned to raise the Argyle Fencibles (1759). This regiment was disbanded in 1763, but fresh regiments were raised in Scotland during the American War of Independence (including the Argyle or Western Fencibles (1778)) and the early stages of the French Revolutionary War (including the Argyle Fencibles (1793), eventually of three battalions).

== Argyll & Bute Militia ==
=== French Revolutionary War ===
Fear of Jacobitism had been replaced by fear of Jacobinism by the 1790s, and the Militia Act 1797 finally extended the county militia system to Scotland. Ten regiments of Scottish militia were raised in 1798 under this Act, including the Argyllshire Militia, ranked 1st out of the 10 (and sometimes known as the Argyllshire (1st North British) Militia). It was under the command of Colonel John Campbell of Shawfield and Islay, given the rank of Brevet Colonel in the army while the regiment was embodied. Many of the personnel came from the 117th Foot or 'Argyllshire Fencibles', which had been raised by the Hon Frederick St John on 22 August 1794 but was disbanded in 1796.

During and after the Irish Rebellion of 1798, a number of British militia units volunteered for service in Ireland, and the Argyllshires served there until early 1800. The militia was disembodied after hostilities with France were ended by the Treaty of Amiens in March 1802. The disembodied Scottish Militia regiments were reorganised under a new Militia Act in 1802, with the Argyllshire regiment being redesignated as the Argyll and Bute Militia, reflecting its wider recruitment area comprising the quotas of both counties. Colonel John Campbell was recommissioned on 1 November 1802 with seniority from 23 May 1798.

=== Napoleonic Wars ===
However, the Peace of Amiens was short-lived and the militia was re-embodied in 1803. By 1805, the regiment was still commanded by Col John Campbell with Sir John Campbell of Ardnamurchan as his Lieutenant-Colonel. During the summer of 1805, when Napoleon was massing his 'Army of England' at Boulogne for a projected invasion, the Argyll & Bute Militia with 524 men in 7 companies under Lt-Col Sir John Campbell was part of the garrison of Edinburgh Castle.

=== Local Militia ===
While the Regular Militia were the mainstay of national defence during the Napoleonic Wars, they were supplemented from 1808 by the Local Militia, which were part-time and only to be used within their own districts. These were raised to counter the declining numbers of Volunteers, and if their ranks could not be filled voluntarily the militia ballot was employed. They were to be trained once a year. The counties of Argyll and Bute raised the following regiments:

- Inverary Regiment: 732 men commanded by the George Campbell, 6th Duke of Argyll
- Light Infantry Regiment: 738 men under Alexander Maclean, 13th Laird of Ardgour, previously Lt-Col of the Argyll Additional Battalion of Volunteers
- 3rd Battalion: 714 men under Lord John Campbell, younger brother of the 6th Duke of Argyll and previously Lt-Col Commandant of the Argyll Volunteers
- Bute Regiment: 366 men

Colonel John Campbell died in 1809 and was succeeded in command of the Argyll & Bute Militia by Lord John Campbell of the 3rd Local Militia battalion. In 1811, the government invited militia regiments to volunteer to serve in Ireland once more, and the Argyll & Bute was stationed there in 1812. The war ended in 1814 and the militia began to be disembodied. This process was halted when Napoleon's escape from Elba in 1815 led to the short Hundred Days campaign and the Battle of Waterloo, but was resumed thereafter; all militia units were disembodied by 1816.

=== Long Peace ===
After Waterloo there was a long peace. Although officers continued to be commissioned into the militia and ballots were still held, the regiments were rarely assembled for training and the permanent staffs of sergeants and drummers (who were occasionally used to maintain public order) were progressively reduced. The headquarters (HQ) of the Argyll & Bute regiment was at Campbeltown.

In 1840, the colonel was still Lord John Campbell, now 7th Duke of Argyll He died in 1847 and by 1850 the senior officer in the disembodied Argyll & Bute Militia was Major C. George Campbell.

=== 1852 Reforms ===
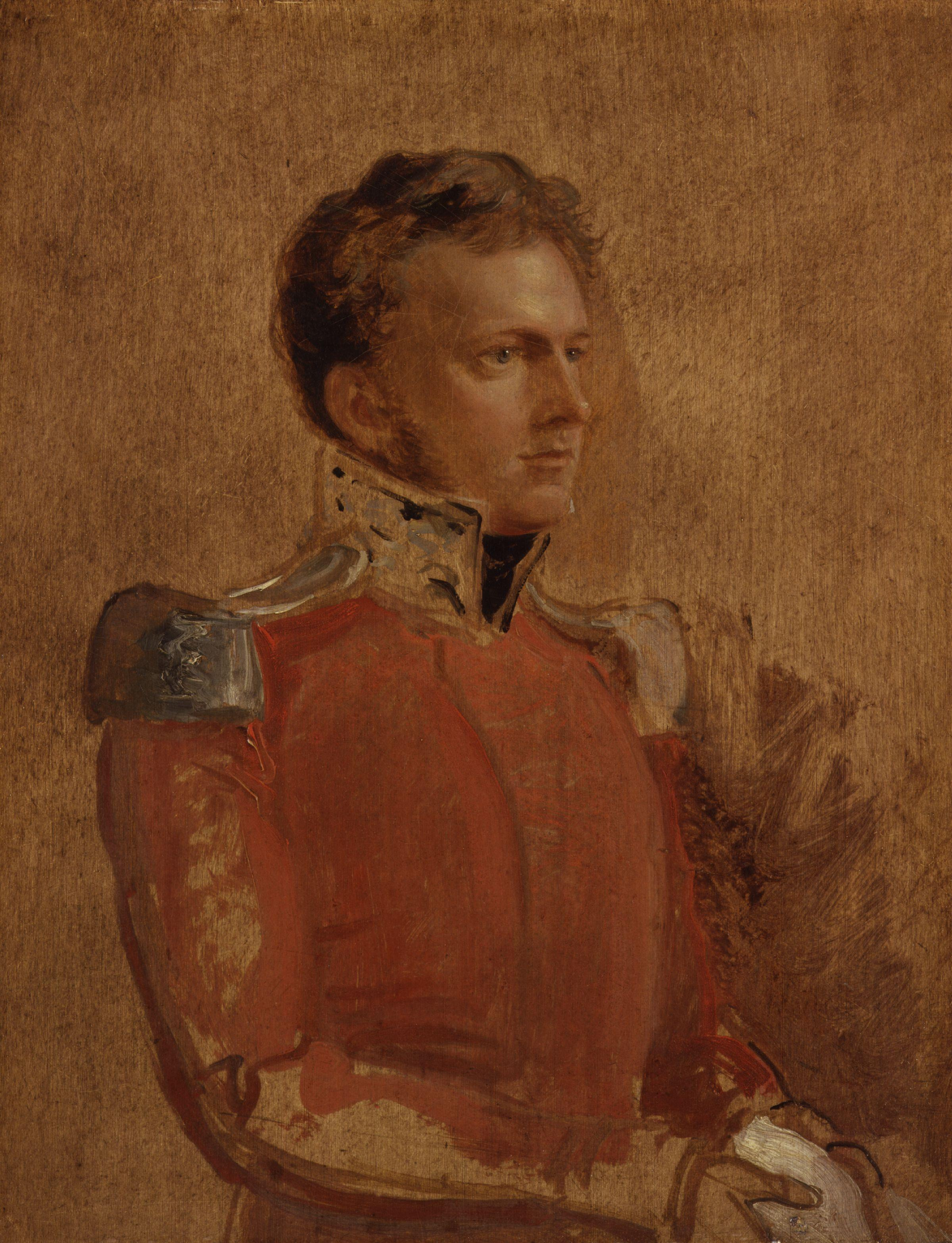
John Campbell, 2nd Marquess of Breadalbane, Hon Colonel of the Argyll & Bute Militia

The United Kingdom Militia was revived by the Militia Act 1852, enacted during a period of international tension. As before, units were raised and administered on a county basis, and filled by voluntary enlistment (although conscription by means of the Militia Ballot might be used if the counties failed to meet their quotas). Training was for 56 days on enlistment, then for 21–28 days per year, during which the men received full army pay. Under the Act, Militia units could be embodied by Royal Proclamation for full-time home defence service in three circumstances:

1. 'Whenever a state of war exists between Her Majesty and any foreign power'.
2. 'In all cases of invasion or upon imminent danger thereof'.
3. 'In all cases of rebellion or insurrection'.

After 1852, no new colonels were appointed to militia regiments; instead, the lieutenant-colonel became commandant and the post of Honorary Colonel was created. When the Argyll & Bute Militia was reformed in 1854, the Lord Lieutenant of Argyllshire, John Campbell, 2nd Marquess of Breadalbane was appointed (honorary) Colonel and Colonel John Campbell, formerly of the 38th Foot, became Lieutenant-Colonel Commandant.

The outbreak of the Crimean War in 1854 and the subsequent despatch of an expeditionary force led to the embodiment of the militia for home defence. By early March 1855, the Argyll & Bute Militia was doing duty at Oban, where it remained until the war was ended by the Treaty of Paris, signed on 30 March 1856. The regiment was disembodied later in 1856.

The regiment was redesignated as the Argyll & Bute Rifles in 1859 with a consequent change in uniform (see below).

== Argyll & Bute Artillery Militia ==
The 1852 Act introduced Militia Artillery units in addition to the traditional infantry regiments. Their role was to man coastal defences and fortifications, relieving the Royal Artillery (RA) for active service. In November 1861 the Argyll and Bute Rifles was converted into the Argyll and Bute Artillery Militia (Rifles) (though the 'Rifles' subtitle was soon dropped). It had its HQ at Oban, moving back to Campbeltown in 1863. Smollett M. Eddington, a former Lieutenant in the 78th Highlanders, was appointed Lt-Col Commandant on 20 November 1861.

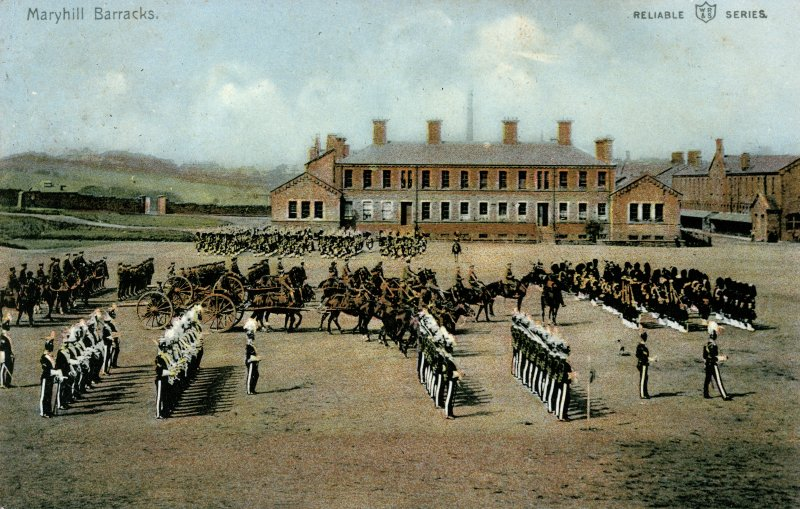
Troops (including artillery) parading at Maryhill Barracks, Glasgow, in 1903.

Following the Cardwell Reforms, a mobilisation scheme began to appear in the Army List from December 1875. This assigned places in an order of battle of the 'Garrison Army' to Militia Artillery units: the Argyll & Bute Artillery's war station was in the Tilbury Division of the Thames and Medway Defences.

The Royal Artillery (RA) was reorganised in 1882, and 11 territorial divisions of garrison artillery were formed, each with a brigade of regular artillery. The Militia Artillery was assigned to form the junior brigades of these divisions, the Argyll & Bute becoming 6th Brigade, Scottish Division, RA, on 1 April 1882.

On 1 July 1889, the garrison artillery was reorganised again into three large territorial divisions (Eastern, Southern and Western). The assignment of units to them seemed geographically arbitrary, with all the Scottish militia units being grouped in the Southern Division, for example, but this related to where the need for coastal artillery was greatest, rather than where the units recruited. The Argyll unit became the Argyll and Bute Artillery (Southern Division). In 1899, the garrison artillery units formally became the Royal Garrison Artillery (RGA). Colonel J. Younger, who had served with the Royal Horse Artillery in the 2nd Anglo-Afghan War, was appointed Lt-Col Commandant on 2 December 1893.

== West of Scotland Artillery ==
By 1895, it had become difficult to obtain recruits in the sparsely populated counties of Argyll and Bute, so the recruiting area was expanded to include Lanarkshire and Renfrewshire. On 7 November 1895, royal approval was given for the unit's title to be changed to The West of Scotland Artillery. Its HQ moved from Campbeltown to Maryhill Barracks, Glasgow, in 1897. The unit was embodied for home defence from 8 May to 3 October 1900, during the Second Boer War.

From 1902 most units of the Militia artillery formally became part of the Royal Garrison Artillery, the unit taking the title of West of Scotland RGA (M).

=== Equipment ===
In 1898, the unit was photographed at practice camp at Buddon manning old muzzle-loading guns on traversing platforms. In 1904, they were again photographed at Buddon, but now manning a mobile heavy battery of 4.7-inch guns on field carriages.

== Disbandment ==
After the Boer War, the future of the Militia was called into question. There were moves to reform all the Auxiliary Forces (Militia, Yeomanry and Volunteers) to take their place in the six Army corps proposed by St John Brodrick as Secretary of State for War. For this, some batteries of Militia Artillery were to be converted to field artillery. However, little of Brodrick's scheme was carried out.

Under the more sweeping Haldane Reforms of 1908, the Militia was replaced by the Special Reserve, a semi-professional force whose role was to provide reinforcement drafts for Regular units serving overseas in wartime. Although the West of Scotland RGA (M) transferred to the Special Reserve Royal Field Artillery on 12 July 1908 (taking the title West of Scotland Royal Field Reserve Artillery), it was disbanded in March 1909. Instead, the men of the RFA Special Reserve would form Brigade Ammunition Columns for the Regular RFA brigades on the outbreak of war.

== Commanders ==
=== Colonels ===
The following served as Colonel of the Regiment:

- John Campbell of Shawfield and Islay, from formation in 1798
- John Campbell, 7th Duke of Argyll, commissioned 1 November 1802, died 1847

=== Lieutenant-colonels ===
Lieutenant-Colonels (commandants from 1854) included:

- Sir John Campbell of Ardnamurchan, by 1805
- John Campbell, formerly 38th Foot, appointed 18 December 1854
- Smollett M. Eddington, formerly 78th Foot, appointed 20 November 1861
- C.N. Lamont, promoted 31 July 1888
- J. Younger, retired regular Lt-Col, appointed 2 December 1893
- Francis A. Walker-Jones, promoted 28 November 1900

=== Honorary Colonels ===
The following served as Honorary Colonel of the regiment:

- John Campbell, 2nd Marquess of Breadalbane, died 1862
- Smollett M. Eddington, former CO, appointed 22 October 1884
- J. Younger, former CO, appointed 3 June 1905

== Heritage & ceremonial ==
=== Uniform & insignia ===
From at least 1814, the regiment's uniform was a red coat with yellow facings. When it was converted into a rifle corps in 1859, the uniform changed to Rifle green with black facings, similar to the Rifle Brigade. It wore black buttons bearing the insignia of a crowned bugle-horn, with the letters 'R' between the cords, 'A' to the left of the bow of the cords, and 'B' to the right. The officers' silver pouchbelt plate bore a design of St Andrew with his cross, surrounded by a crowned thistle wreath, with the regimental title on a scroll beneath.

In 1862, the regiment adopted the normal Royal Artillery uniform of blue with red facings, but with silver instead of gold buttons From 1895 to 1901, the officers wore the standard RA Sabretache and pouch embroidered with the Royal Arms and gun badge, with 'WEST OF SCOTLAND ARTILLERY' on a scroll beneath. Similarly, the gilt plate on the Home Service helmet had the title on a scroll beneath the Royal Arms and gun; prior to this the Scottish Division plate had been worn. Around 1907, the other ranks wore the brass titles 'R.G.A' over 'W.SCOTLAND' on the shoulder straps of the khaki service dress.

=== Precedence ===
At the start of the French Revolutionary War, in 1793, the English counties balloted for the order of precedence of their militia regiments; when the Scottish ('North British') Militia were raised in 1798, they had their own separate order, with the Argyll ranked as the '1st North British'.

Another ballot for precedence took place in 1803, at the beginning of the Napoleonic War, covering the whole of Great Britain, and this list remained in force until 1833. The Argyll & Bute Militia was now ranked 43rd.

In 1833, the King drew the lots for individual militia regiments across the whole of the United Kingdom. Regiments raised before the peace of 1783 took the first 69 places, followed by those raised for the French Revolutionary War: the Argyll & Bute Militia ranked 117th.

When the Artillery Militia was formed in 1853–55, the corps were listed in alphabetical order; later, units were added at the end of the list. Thus, the Argyll & Bute was ranked 30th when it was converted in 1861.

== See also ==
- 117th Regiment of Foot (1794)
- Campbell of Argyll Militia
- 1st Argyll and Bute Artillery Volunteers
- Militia (Great Britain)
- Militia (United Kingdom)
- Militia Artillery units of the United Kingdom and Colonies
- Scottish Division, Royal Artillery
- Southern Division, Royal Artillery
