= John Campbell, 1st Marquess of Breadalbane =

British military officer and landowner (1762-1834)

Lieutenant-General The Most Honourable The Marquess of Breadalbane FRS
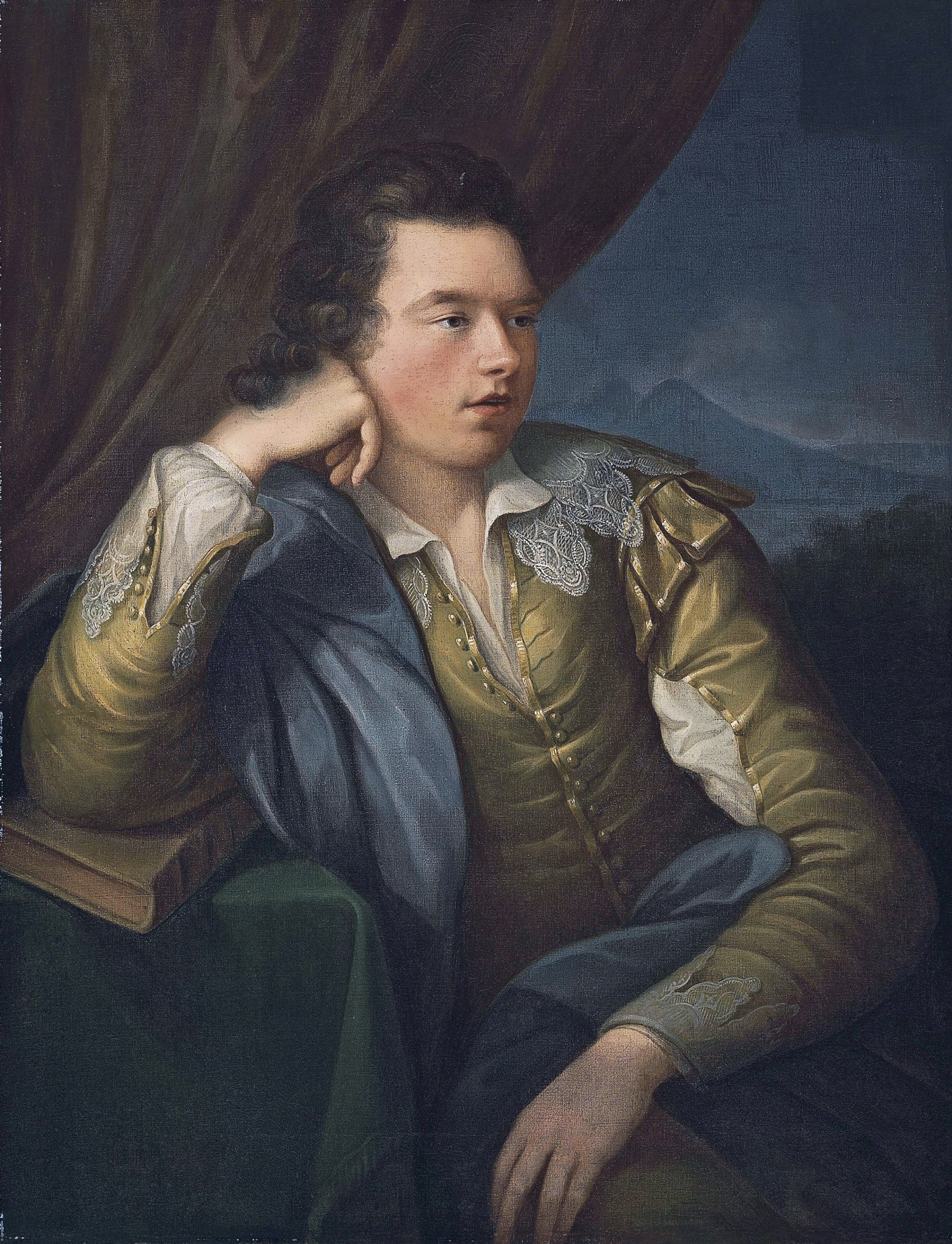
- Portrait by Angelica Kauffman
- Born: John Campbell; 30 March 1762; Great Britain
- Died: 29 March 1834 (aged 71); Taymouth Castle, Perthshire, Great Britain and Ireland
- Spouse: Mary Gavin (m. 1793)
- Issue: Mary Campbell; John, Earl of Ormelie
- Father: Colin Campbell
- Mother: Elizabeth Campbell

Lieutenant-General John Campbell, 1st Marquess of Breadalbane, FRS (30 March 1762 – 29 March 1834), known as John Campbell until 1782 and as The Earl of Breadalbane and Holland between 1782 and 1831, was a British military officer and landowner.

== Background and education ==
Campbell was the son of Colin Campbell of Carwhin by Elizabeth Campbell, daughter of Archibald Campbell, of Stonefield. He was a great-grandson of Colin Campbell of Mochaster, younger son of Sir Robert Campbell, 3rd Baronet, of Glenorchy, and uncle of John Campbell, 1st Earl of Breadalbane and Holland. He was educated at Winchester.

== Career ==
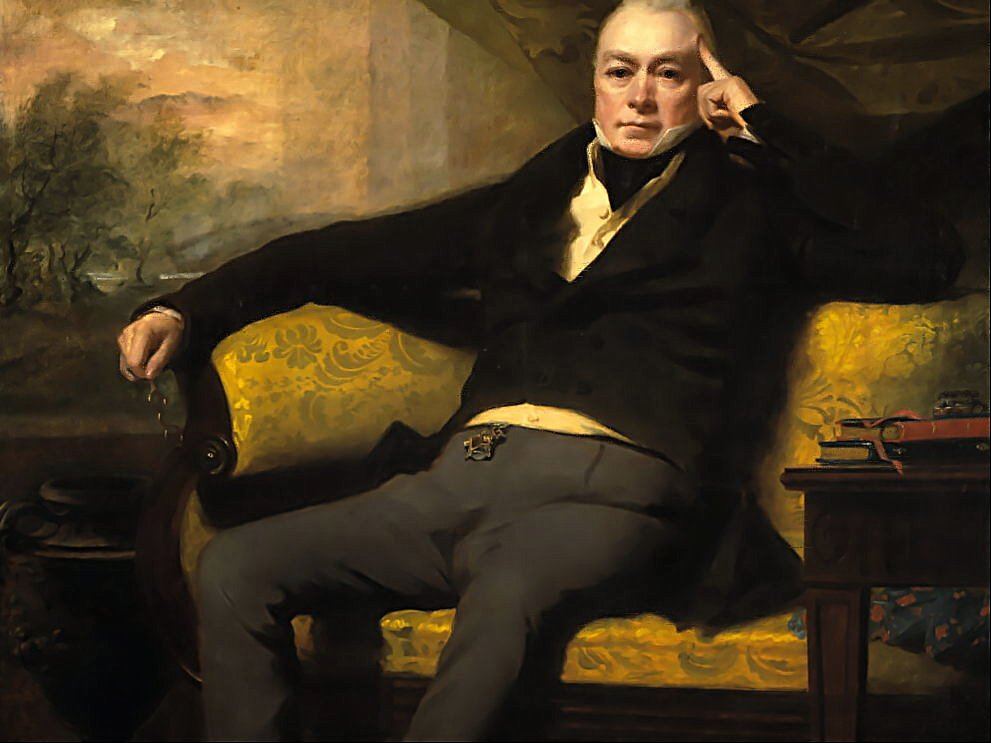
Portrait of John Campbell by Henry Raeburn, approx.1822

In January, 1782, at age 19, Campbell succeeded his kinsman in the earldom of Breadalbane and Holland. This was a Scottish peerage and did not entitle him to an automatic seat in the House of Lords. However, in 1784 he was elected as one of the sixteen Scottish representative peers to sit in the House of Lords. The same year he was appointed a Fellow of the Royal Society.

Lord Breadalbane and Holland raised the Breadalbane Fencibles Regiment, in which he served as a lieutenant-colonel. He became colonel in 1802, a major-general in 1809 and a lieutenant-general in 1814. In 1806 he was created Baron Breadalbane, of Taymouth Castle in the County of Perth, in the Peerage of the United Kingdom, which entitled him to a seat in the House of Lords. In 1831 he was further honoured when he was made Earl of Ormelie and Marquess of Breadalbane in the Peerage of the United Kingdom.

According to the book Braves and Buffalo: Plains Indian Life in 1837, which presents watercolours by Alfred J. Miller of Sir William Drummond Stewart's expedition to the American West, Stewart presented seven captured bison to the Marquis of Breadalbane. The animals were shipped to the family estate at Taymouth where they are said to have become tame and borne young.

== Family ==
Lord Breadalbane married Mary Gavin, daughter of David Gavin, of Langton House, Berwickshire, in 1793. They had one son and two daughters. One daughter, Lady Mary Campbell, married Richard Temple-Grenville, 2nd Duke of Buckingham and Chandos. Their second daughter, Lady Elizabeth Maitland Campbell (1794–1878) married Sir John Pringle, 5th Baronet of Stichill, as his second wife.

Lord Breadalbane died at Taymouth Castle, Perthshire, in March 1834, aged 71, and was succeeded by his only son, John, Earl of Ormelie. The Marchioness of Breadalbane died in September 1845.

== Notes ==
Peerage of Scotland
Preceded by John Campbell	Earl of Breadalbane and Holland; 1782–1834	Succeeded by John Campbell
Peerage of the United Kingdom
New creation	Marquess of Breadalbane; 1831–1834	Succeeded by John Campbell
New creation	Baron Breadalbane; 1806–1834	Succeeded by John Campbell
