= Beaufort, Nord =

Beaufort
- Commune
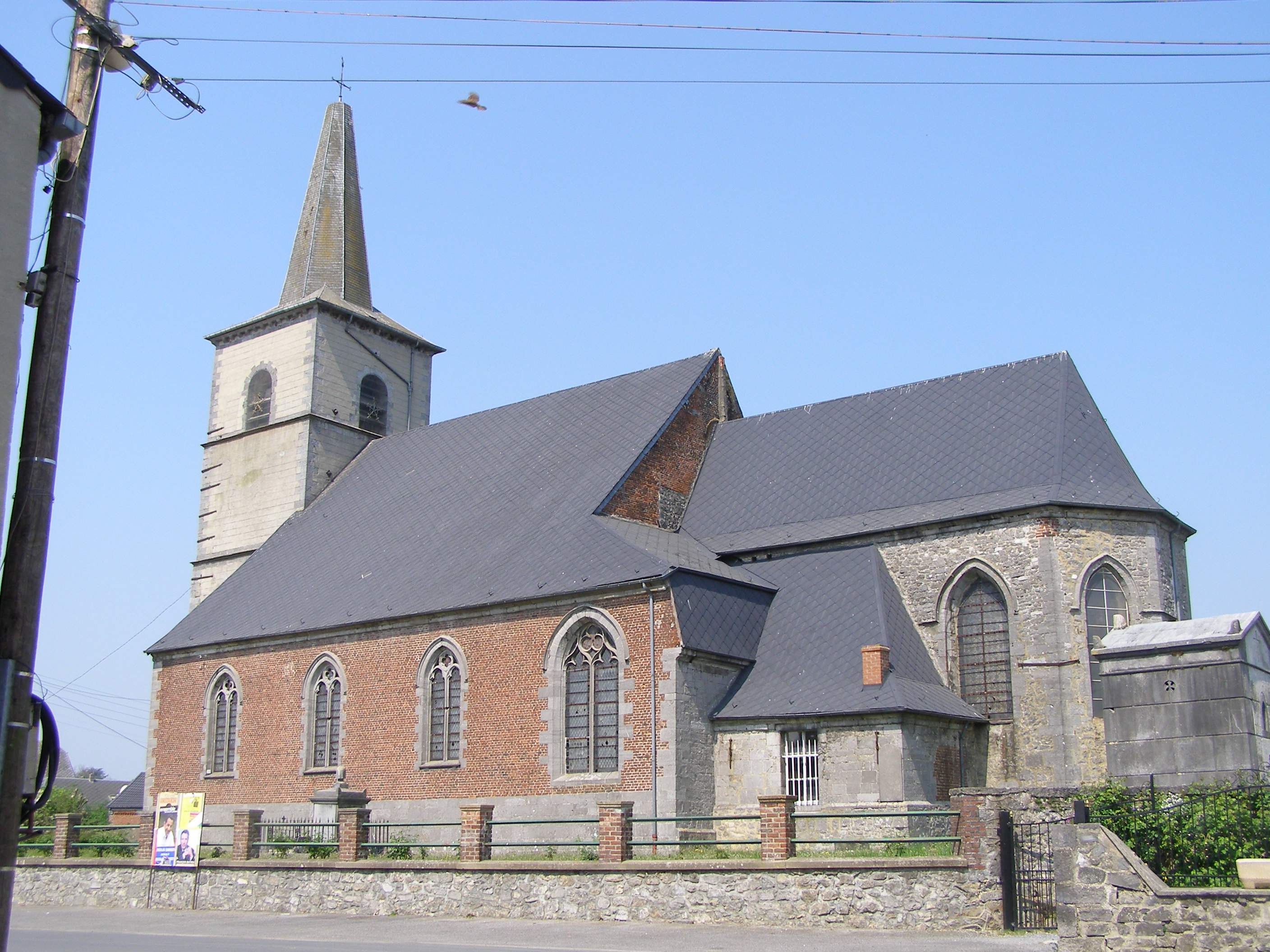
- Church of the Assumption

- Coat of arms
- Location of Beaufort
- Location within France Location within Hauts-de-France
- Coordinates: 50°12′56″N 3°57′54″E
- Country: France
- Region: Hauts-de-France
- Department: Nord
- Arrondissement: Avesnes-sur-Helpe
- Canton: Avesnes-sur-Helpe
- Intercommunality: CA Maubeuge Val de Sambre

Government
  - Mayor (2020–2026): Thérèse Pécher
- Area^{1}: 12.76 km^{2} (4.93 sq mi)
- Elevation: 168 m (551 ft)
- Highest elevation: 207 m (679 ft)
- Lowest elevation: 154 m (505 ft)
- Population (2023): 995
  - Density: 78.0/km^{2} (202/sq mi)
- Time zone: UTC+01:00 (CET)
  - Summer (DST): UTC+02:00 (CEST)
- INSEE/Postal code: 59058 /59330
- ^{1} French Land Register data, which excludes lakes, ponds, glaciers > 1 km^{2} (0.386 sq mi or 247 acres) and river estuaries.

Beaufort (French pronunciation: [bofɔʁ]) is a commune in the Nord department in northern France.

== Population ==
Historical population
Year	Pop.	±% p.a.
1968	1,067	—
1975	1,010	−0.78%
1982	1,011	+0.01%
1990	1,100	+1.06%
1999	1,012	−0.92%
2007	976	−0.45%
2012	967	−0.19%
2017	1,000	+0.67%
2023	995	−0.08%
Source: INSEE

== Heraldry ==
Arms of Beaufort	The arms of Beaufort are blazoned : Gules, 3 inescutcheons argent.

== See also ==
- Communes of the Nord department
