= 39th Siege Battery, Royal Garrison Artillery =

69th Siege Battery, RGA
- Cap Badge of the Royal Regiment of Artillery
- Active: 10 June 1915–16 April 1920
- Country: United Kingdom
- Branch: British Army
- Role: Siege Artillery
- Part of: Royal Garrison Artillery
- Garrison/HQ: Liverpool
- Engagements: Battle of Mount Sorrel; Battle of the Somme; Battle of Messines; Third Battle of Ypres; German Spring Offensive; Hundred Days Offensive

The 39th Siege Battery was a heavy howitzer unit of Britain's Royal Garrison Artillery (RGA) raised during World War I. It saw active service on the Western Front from late 1915 to the Armistice in 1918, taking part in the Battles of Mount Sorrel, the Somme, Messines and Third Ypres, against the German spring offensive, and in the final Allied Hundred Days Offensive.

== Mobilisation ==
On the outbreak of war in August 1914, units of the part-time Territorial Force (TF) were invited to volunteer for Overseas Service, and most of the Liverpool-based Lancashire and Cheshire Royal Garrison Artillery (L&CRGA) did so. By October 1914, the campaign on the Western Front was bogging down into Trench warfare and there was an urgent need for batteries of siege artillery to be sent to France. The WO decided that the TF coastal gunners were well enough trained to take over many of the duties in the coastal defences, releasing Regular Army RGA gunners for service in the field, Soon the TF RGA companies that had volunteered for overseas service were also supplying trained gunners to RGA units serving overseas and providing cadres to form complete units with 'New Army' (Kitchener's Army) volunteers.

39th Siege Bty was formed at Sheerness on 10 June 1915 with a cadre provided by the L&CRGA including Captain G.G. Mallinson. It joined J Siege Brigade (Training), which formed at Aldershot on 15 June and mobilised at Taunton on 30 September as 33rd Siege Brigade. Surplus men from the unit joined 58th and 60th Siege Batteries formed at Lydd on 11 September.

== Service ==
=== Western Front ===
39th Siege Bty went out to the Western Front on 2 November 1915 and joined No 2 Heavy Artillery Reserve (HAR) Group, which was serving with Second Army in the Ypres Salient.

39th Siege Bty was equipped with four 8-inch howitzers. At this stage of the war the 8-inch howitzers in use (Marks I–V) were improvised from cut-down and bored-out barrels of 6-inch coast defence guns, with the recoil checked by enormous wooden wedges. The battery unloaded its guns at Boulogne on 5 November and between 13 and 15 November it emplaced them at Elverdinge, north of Ypres. On 19 November it began registering its guns on local targets with the help of air observation whenever the weather was clear enough. Some of these shoots brought down retaliatory fire from the Germans. Communications with the battery's own Forward Observation Officers (FOOs) in the front line were frequently cut by shellfire. From December the battery began short bombardments of requested targets, while continuing its registration. Regular targets included 'Von Spree Farm' and 'Essen Farm'. Requests came for bombardments of troublesome machine gun and mortar positions, SOS calls from frontline infantry subjected to trench raids, and for retaliatory shelling of gun positions. This routine continued through the early months of 1916, with the battery suffering a steady trickle of casualties. In late March the battery struggled to move a howitzer from its Left Section (LX) to a better position with the help of a Holt 75 caterpillar tractor; the other followed two weeks later, as a result of which the sections temporarily became North and South (NX and SX) instead of the usual Left and Right (LX and RX).

RGA Brigades became Heavy Artillery Groups (HAGs) on 2 April 1916, and batteries were moved between them as required. On 7 May 24th HAG took over from 33rd HAG, the battery remaining in position. It continued registering targets and bombarding enemy trenches, machine gun positions, and buildings such as Langemarck Station, despite serviceability problems with its old howitzers and ammunition, and with observing aircraft. NX also came under heavy enemy fire on 18 May, when the farm it occupied was set on fire and a number of 8-inch cartridges destroyed.

=== Mount Sorrel ===
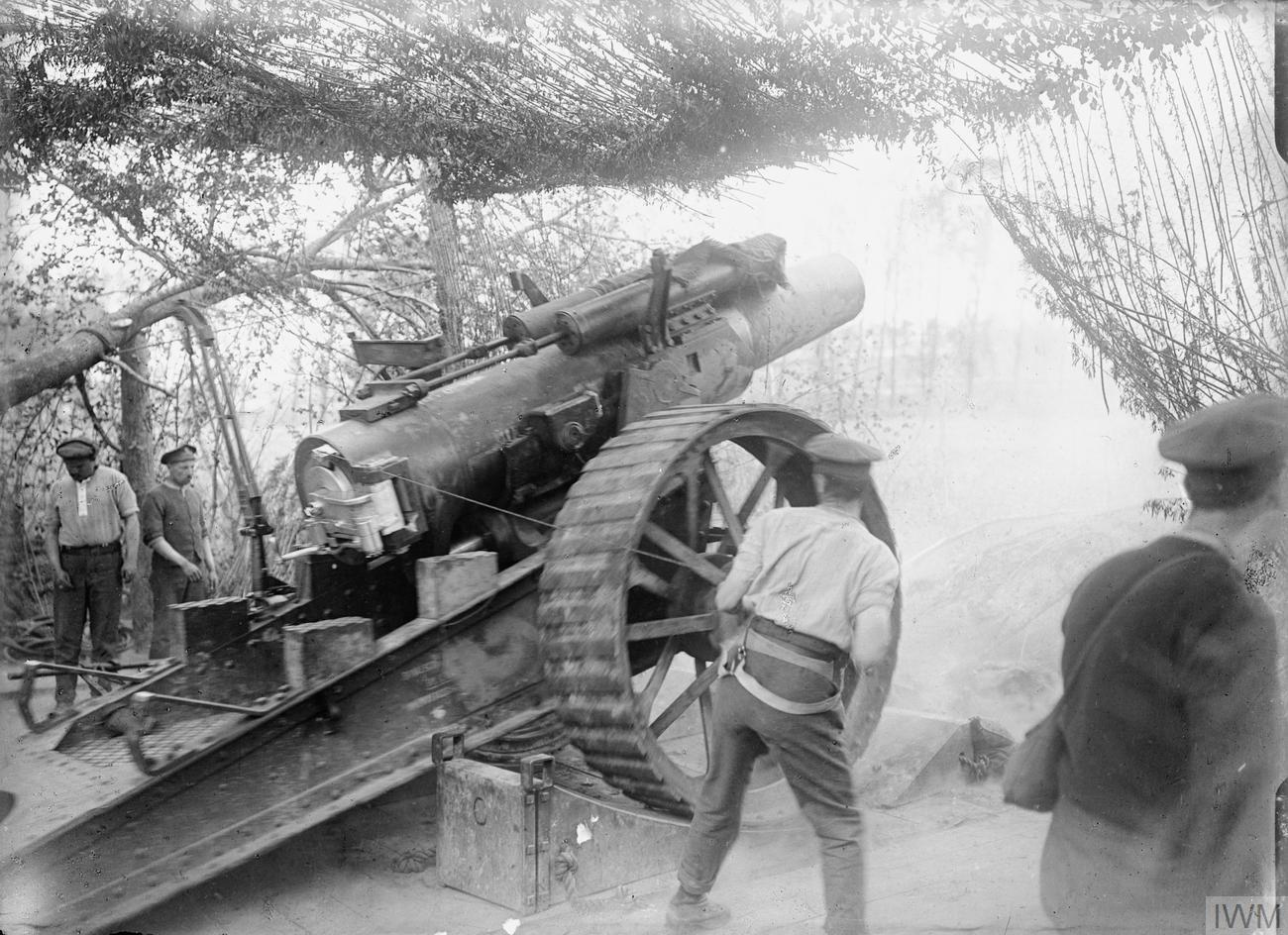
8-inch howitzer Mk I at almost full recoil.

At 15.00 on 5 June, LX was ordered to take its two howitzers and lay platforms for them in the Canadian Corps sector opposite Hill 60 by dawn the next morning. This was successfully carried out (re-using platforms originally laid for 6-inch howitzers) and the guns and ammunition were ready for action at 03.00 on 6 June. The section was part of the limited, mainly artillery, reinforcements sent to the Canadians after they had been driven off 'Mount Sorrel', the easternmost part of the Ypres Salient, on 2 June. The Canadian counter-attack planned for 6 June was delayed because the weather was too bad for aircraft to spot for the guns, so the British heavies had a few additional days to pound the German trenches and batteries. Left Section fired on trenches for three days, then registered on Hollebeke Chateau. By 12 June the trails of the 8-inch howitzers were sinking into the soft ground, while the FOO party was shelled out of their position. In addition the section had received 420 faulty shells that could not be fuzed, and it could only provide a slow bombardment. Nevertheless, the Canadian night attack ay 01.30 on 13 June ended the Battle of Mount Sorrel by retaking most of their previous positions. Left Section participated in the preliminary bombardment, concentrating on 'The Snout' from which German machine guns might enfilade the attacking infantry. Then at dawn LX was ordered to move out, and the caterpillar tractors and guns were on the road by 08.40.

Meanwhile, Battery HQ and RX had gone by train on 9 June to join 27th HAG with III Corps under Fourth Army in the Somme sector, where the guns were dug in near Albert. LX joined the rest of the battery on 15 June.

=== Somme ===
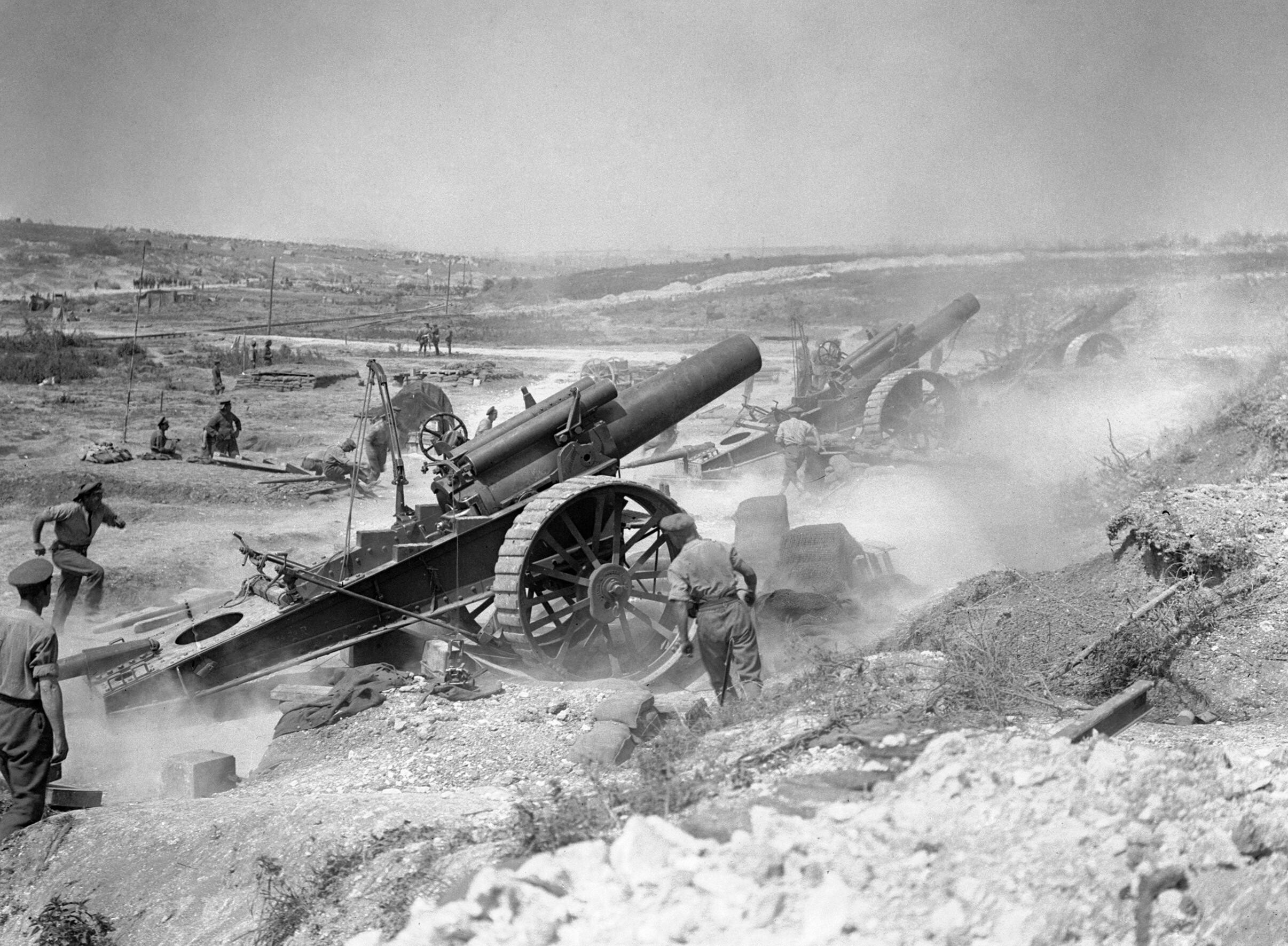
39th Siege Bty during a shoot in the Fricourt-Mametz Valley, August 1916.

Fourth Army was preparing for that year's 'Big Push', the Battle of the Somme, with III Corps facing the German redoubts in front of Ovillers. From 20 June 39th Siege Bty registered its guns and then began bombarding the villages of Contalmaison, Martinpuich and Pozières behind the German lines, even though many of the shells delivered to it were defective. The main bombardment was to extend over five days, U, V, W, X and Y, before the assault was launched on Z day. The strenuous work of firing the heavy guns and howitzers was divided into 2-hour periods to allow the gunners to rest, FOOs to be relieved, and the guns to cool. U Day was 24 June, but on several days the weather was too bad for good air or ground observation and the programme was extended by two days (Y1 and Y2). The infantry commanders were still dissatisfied with the effects on Ovillers (many heavy howitzer shells failed to burst) and brought up trench mortars to supplement the heavies. The final bombardment began at 06.25 on Z Day (1 July). When the infantry launched their assault at 07.30, III Corps had its heavy guns lengthen their range in a series of timed 'lifts' ahead of them (these had been practised during the previous days). However, the bombardment had failed to knock out many of the machine gun positions, and as soon as the attackers went 'over the top' they began to take heavy casualties. 34th Division attacking up the Fricourt Spur in front of 39th Siege Bty was supposed to clear La Boisselle and then move on Contalmaison and Pozières, but the leading battalions of three of its columns suffered 80 per cent casualties in a matter of 10 minutes. The right column fared better, advancing nearly a mile across the Fricourt Spur, but missed the redoubts that it was meant to capture. There was no immediate reserve to carry this out, and the leading parties were mopped up or driven back. 34th Division suffered the heaviest casualties of any division on the First day on the Somme.

The battery continued to support the attacks on Bazentin le Petit and Pozières, then on Le Sars, Martinpuich, High Wood and Courcelette as the offensive continued through the summer and into the autumn. As the ranges increased, the battery moved up to Mametz Wood in late September, over appalling roads under occasional shellfire. As the fighting died down in November the battery re-equipped with modern Mk VI 8-inch howitzers.

=== Messines ===
On 27 January 1917 the battery moved by road and rail to join 5th HAG in Second Army at Ypres, moving to 69th HAG on 9 February, and then to 19th HAG on 12 May. It carried out the normal registration and harassing fire (HF) tasks, as well as counter-battery (CB) fire. Its usual targets were 'White Chateau', 'Red Chateau', the 'Brickstacks', 'Hiele Farm', 'Dome House' and 'Martine Farm', with the FOO's observation post (OP) sometimes at the 'Spoil Bank' behind St Eloi. This activity reached a crescendo in early June, as Second Army prepared for the Battle of Messines.

On 1 June 1917 39th Siege Bty was joined by a section (2 officers and 70 other ranks (ORs) with two 8-inch howitzers) from the newly-arrived 311th Siege Bty, bringing the battery up to an establishment of six guns. 311th Siege Bty had been formed in the Forth Garrison on 20 December 1916 under Army Council Instruction 2379. It had arrived on the Western Front on 19 May 1917 and joined X Corps Heavy Artillery. It had been immediately broken up, one section going to 39th Siege Bty, the other to 249th Siege Bty. (Note: The 'Allocation of Siege Batteries RGA' list, followed by Frederick, suggests that the section possibly joined 391st, not 39th Siege Bty, but its arrival is confirmed by 39th's war diary.)

The bombardment continued against enemy trenches until the assault went in on 7 June, following the explosion of huge mines. The battery fired 1214 rounds during the day, with a further 37 rounds on an SOS target in the evening. The results of the limited attack were spectacular, and the battery continued firing heavily on German positions as the British consolidated their gains. The British artillery was repositioned after the battle, 39th Siege Bty coming under the command of 84th HAG on 15 June as that group joined Second Army.

=== Ypres ===
39th Siege Bty transferred back to 24th HAG on 10 July, handing over its forward positions to 208th Siege Bty and completing its move to fresh forward positions on 13 July. 24th HAG was now with Fifth Army, which was taking over the northern section of the Ypres Salient in preparation for the Third Ypres Offensive. The artillery preparation began on 16 July and 39th Siege Bty fired on targets such as 'Stirling Castle' and Zandvoorde, as well as practising the barrage that would be fired on Z Day in support of II Corps' assault

Zero hour was 03.50 on 31 July (the Battle of Pilckem Ridge). The battery fired 686 rounds in the barrage and then began firing on strongpoints such as Glencorse Wood. II Corps had the hardest task of the day on the Gheluvelt Plateau, and its attack fell short of its objectives, despite a special barrage and SOS fire on Glencorse Wood provided by 39th Siege Bty in the evening.

Bad weather then delayed the resumption of the offensive. 39th Siege Bty continued firing on Glencorse Wood (partially captured by II Corps on 10 August), Polygon Wood and Nonneboschen. It pulled two guns into a forward position on the night of 13/14 August. The next major attack, the Battle of Langemarck went ahead on 16 August, but was largely unsuccessful, II Corps' gains being lost to German counter-attacks.

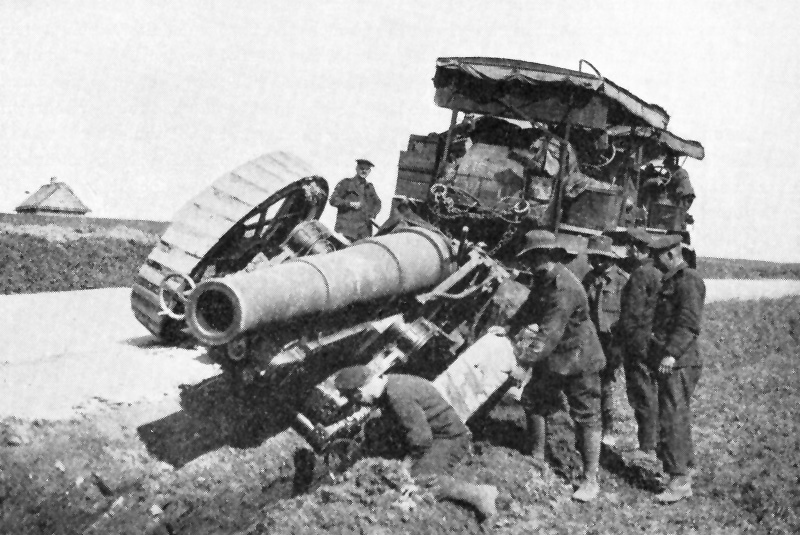
8-inch howitzer Mk VI ditched while under tow by a Holt 75 caterpillar tractor.

Captain Mallinson of the original L&CRGA cadre left the battery on 13 August 1917 to take command of 221st Siege Bty. The campaign ground on during the summer, with the battery firing daily harassing and 'SOS' tasks. On 18/19 August it moved the rest of its guns forward to Chateau Segard to shorten the range, but between 7 and 12 September it pulled them back by ones and twos into Ypres while some gunners went to rest camp, until the whole battery had taken up new positions under 30th HAG. Second Army HQ had assumed control of the operations and tried new artillery tactics for the Battle of the Menin Road Ridge on 20 September. 39th Siege Bty registered its guns on Zonnebeke and carried out practice barrages, moving two guns into Railway Wood on 19 September. During the attack next day it suffered a number of casualties and had three guns damaged. The limited attack on the Gheluvelt Plateau, however, was a success, and was repeated on 26 September (the Battle of Polygon Wood) and 4 October (the Battle of Broodseinde, during which period the battery fired on barrage lines to protect the infantry. By the Battle of Poelcappelle on 9 October the British gunners were struggling to bring up guns and ammunition through the morass of mud to continue the offensive at the First Battle of Passchendaele on 12 October. The gunners of 39th Siege Bty were relieved from the line on 16 October and sent to Wizernes for rest. They returned on 22 October and resumed barrage fire for the Second Battle of Passchendaele. Conditions for the artillery were by now very bad: British batteries were clearly observable from the Passchendaele Ridge and suffered badly from counter-battery fire, while their own guns sank into the mud and became difficult to aim and fire. The fighting finally died down in November.

=== Winter 1917–18 ===
In late November the battery's role changed from firing barrages to protect infantry attacks to CB HF tasks, as well as firing on targets of opportunity spotted by the FOO, such as enemy working parties. Reinforcements arrived from the base to replace casualties and the battery was able to improve its positions.

Having been frequently switched from one HAG to another, the battery remained with 30th HAG for the rest of the war. By now HAG allocations were becoming more fixed, and on 1 February 1918 they were converted into permanent RGA brigades. 30th was defined as an 8-inch howitzer brigade, with 39th Siege Bty providing the heavy component, along with three 6-inch howitzer batteries.

=== Spring Offensive ===
The Ypres front was not affected by the initial stages of the German Spring Offensive launched on 21 March 1918. The Germans launched a new phase of the offensive (the Battle of the Lys) south of Ypres on 9 April, but all was quiet in front of Ypres itself: 30th Bde's howitzers neutralised two hostile batteries during the day. Then at 04.45 on 10 April 'counter-preparation' fire was called for as IX Corps' front south of Ypres was 'vigorously attacked' (the Battle of Messines (1918)). Soon 30th Bde was ordered to switch some of its guns to face this attack, including two of 39th Siege Bty from Frezenberg, which were back in action at midnight. Further counter-preparations were fired next day, and 39th Siege Bty was ordered to pull out its remaining guns. The battery's commander Maj F.A. Yorke, was given command of a temporary HAG ('Yorke Group') on 12 April, consisting of 39th, 22nd and 308th Siege Btys, taking over the brigade HQ at the Lille Gate of Ypres while the rest of the brigade was pulled out to Ouderdom. Yorke Group was broken up on 14 April as Second Army began to retire from the Passchendaele Ridge to shorten its line – 39th Siege Bty was obliged to abandon over 400 rounds of ammunition for lack of transport when the howitzers were pulled out of range. The handier 6-inch howitzers continued to carry out HF and counter-preparation to disrupt the German attacks until they were forced back to the ramparts of Ypres itself on 26 April, with 39th Siege Bty back at Busseboom.

Although the last major German attack in the sector died out on 29 April, the battery positions remained under regular fire from high explosive and gas shells. On 8 May 30th Bde's batteries supported 33rd Division as it was attacked at Ridge Wood, then established a defensive flank and successfully counter-attacked.

On 21 May 30th Bde was pulled out of the line for rest and training in GHQ Reserve. 39th Siege Bty was billeted at La Commune, then entrained on 25 May for Acq, near Arras. On 19 June 39th Siege Bty had four guns back 'in action' north of Arras, where 30th Bde had concentrated under First Army. It remained with this army until the end of the war. 39th Siege Bty brought up its other two guns after the assigned gun positions had been converted to take the large platforms of the Vickers 8-inch guns. Once the guns had been registered, the early summer was spent on HF and CB fire tasks, sometimes guided by sound ranging or observation aircraft.

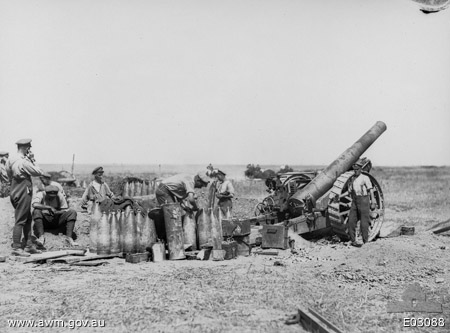
8-inch howitzer in action, 1918.

=== Hundred Days Offensive ===
The Allied Hundred Days Offensive began on 8 August and First Army began to advance cautiously on 18 August. 39th Siege Bty supported VIII Corps' advances with long-range CB fire observed by aircraft . It also attacked enemy transport: 29 August saw 39th Siege Bty shelling an enemy light railway system, and on 2 September it fired at a convoy of lorries. The batteries had been reconnoitring forward positions to follow the advance, and on the night of 3/4 September NX of 39th Siege Bty moved up. It continued CB shoots when the weather permitted, on one occasion bombarding an enemy gas shell dump with aircraft observation.

By now the Germans had retired to the Hindenburg Line. On 19 September the heavy guns started moving forward ready to support First Army in the Battle of the Canal du Nord beginning on 27 September. The night before, 30th Bde supported 8th and 20th (Light) Divisions in a preliminary attack beginning at midnight, after which the Canadian Corps broke through in the morning. By 3 October patrols revealed that the enemy had retired out of range.

On 4 October 39th Siege Bty moved four guns up, then on 10 October the other two went forward to Avion. It reached Billy-Montigny with five of its howitzers on 13 October, but on 18 October it had to be left behind because there was no canal bridge strong enough to take its heavy howitzers and caterpillar tractors. On 24 October it was ordered up to Carvin, but next day this march was halted when another bridge was found to be too weak. It finally moved up on 1 November, two of its howitzers came into action on 4 November and two more next day, but the Germans were retreating too quickly for the heavy howitzers to keep up. Hostilities ended on 11 November when the Armistice with Germany came into effect. On 18 November, 39th Siege Bty parked its guns in the square at Carvin.

The Commonwealth War Graves Commission lists the names of 46 members of the battery who died in service; there may be others who were simply listed as RGA.

== Postwar ==
39th Siege Battery continued in the Regular Army after the Armistice. It became 39th Battery, RGA, on 19 April 1919, and converted into 39th Mountain Battery, RGA on 20 January 1920. However, on 16 April that year it was absorbed by the cadre of 3rd Mountain Bty in India.
