= Alex MacLean (footballer) =

Scottish footballer

Personal information
- Full name: Alexander MacLean
- Date of birth: c. 1879
- Place of birth: Scotland
- Date of death: 29 October 1917 (aged 38)
- Place of death: Glasgow, Scotland
- Position: Forward

Senior career*
Years	Team	Apps	(Gls)
–1899	Strathclyde		
1899–1900	Heart of Midlothian	0	(0)
1900–1901	Queen's Park	7	(0)
- * Club domestic league appearances and goals

Alexander MacLean (c. 1879 – 29 October 1917) was a Scottish amateur footballer who played in the Scottish League for Queen's Park as a forward.

== Personal life ==
MacLean worked as a commercial clerk for Glasgow whisky and wine merchants Messrs Mitchell Bros Ltd. On 9 December 1915, during the First World War he enlisted as a private in the Cameronians (Scottish Rifles). He was discharged due to illness in September 1917 and died of tuberculosis at Ruchill Hospital on 29 October 1917.

== Career statistics ==
Appearances and goals by club, season and competition
Club	Season	League			Scottish Cup		Other		Total	
Club	Season	Division	Apps	Goals	Apps	Goals	Apps	Goals	Apps	Goals
Queen's Park	1900–01	Scottish First Division	5	0	0	0	1 (Note: Appearance in Glasgow Cup)	0	6	0
Queen's Park	1901–02	Scottish First Division	2	0	0	0	0	0	2	0
Career total			7	0	0	0	1	0	8	0
