= Alexander Maclean (painter) =

Scottish painter

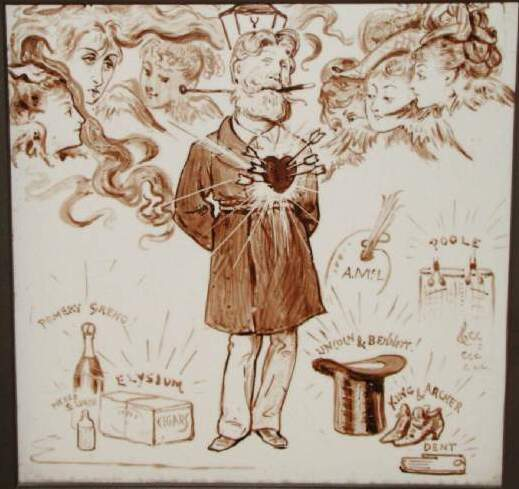
- Caricature of Maclean by Fred Barnard
- Born: November 1840
- Died: 30 October 1877 (aged 36)
- Occupation: Painter

Alexander Maclean (November 1840 – 30 October 1877) was a Scottish painter.

== Biography ==
Maclean was born in November 1840, was son of David Maclean, a manufacturer at Glasgow. After being educated at Helensburgh and Edinburgh he was placed in business at Glasgow, which he abandoned in 1861. He then adopted the profession of an artist, and studied at Rome, Florence, and Antwerp. He first exhibited at the Royal Academy in 1872. In 1874 he attracted public notice there with his 'Covent Garden Market,' and again in 1876 with 'Looking Back.' This success he followed up in 1877 with 'At the Railings, St. Paul's, Covent Garden.' His health, however, began to fail, and he died on 30 October 1877 at St. Leonards-on-Sea, at the commencement of a very promising career.
