= John Campbell, 2nd Marquess of Breadalbane =

British Liberal politician (1796–1862)

The Most Honourable The Marquess of Breadalbane KT PC FRS FSA
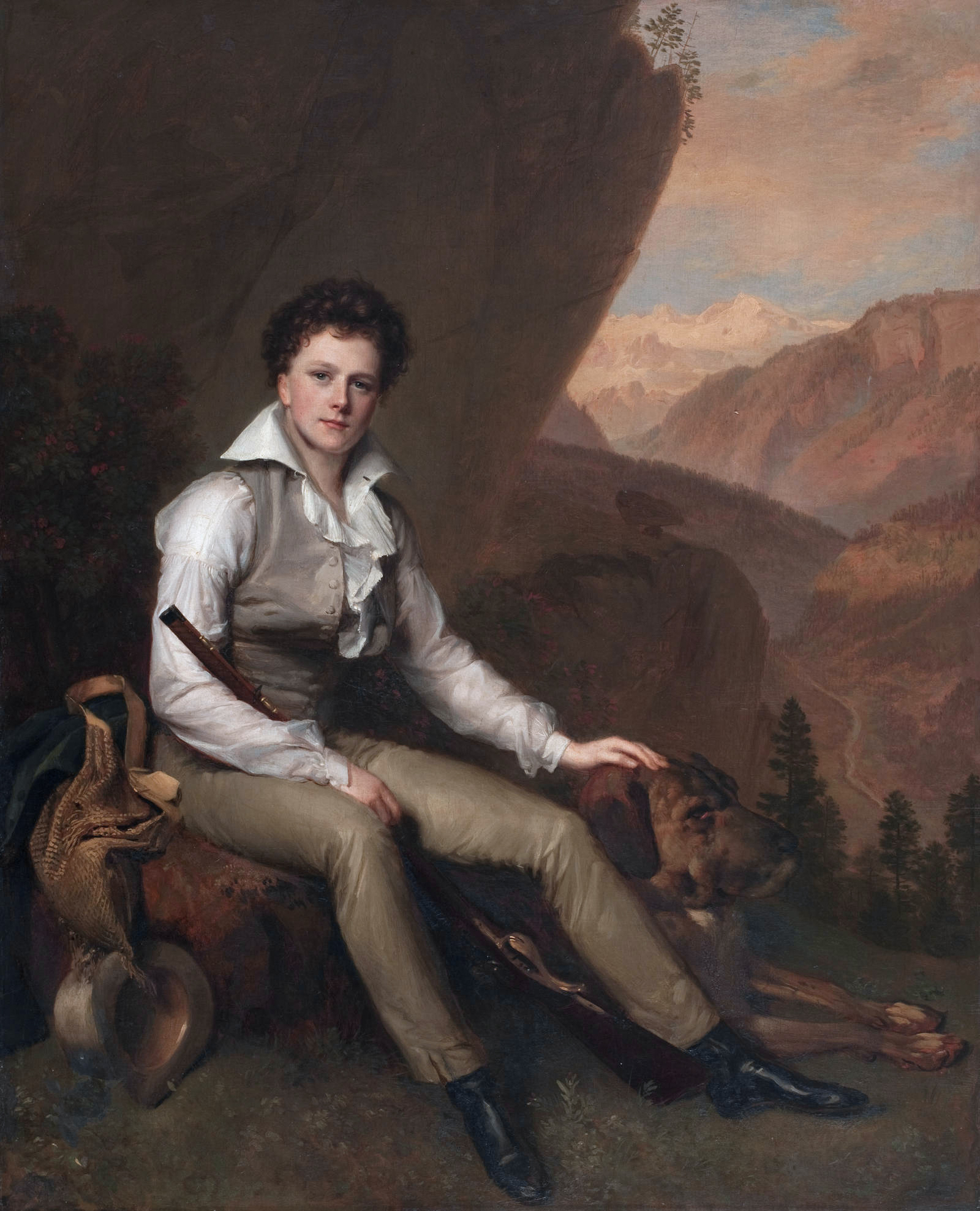
- Portrait by Firmin Massot

Lord Chamberlain of the Household
- In office 5 September 1848 – 21 February 1852
- Monarch: Victoria
- Prime Minister: Lord John Russell
- Preceded by: The Earl Spencer
- Succeeded by: The Marquess of Exeter
- In office 15 January 1853 – 21 February 1858
- Monarch: Victoria
- Prime Minister: The Earl of Aberdeen; The Viscount Palmerston
- Preceded by: The Marquess of Exeter
- Succeeded by: The Earl De La Warr

Personal details
- Born: 26 October 1796 Dundee, Angus, Scotland
- Died: 8 November 1862 (aged 66) Lausanne, Switzerland
- Party: Liberal
- Spouse: Lady Elizabeth "Eliza" Baillie (m. 1821; died 1861)

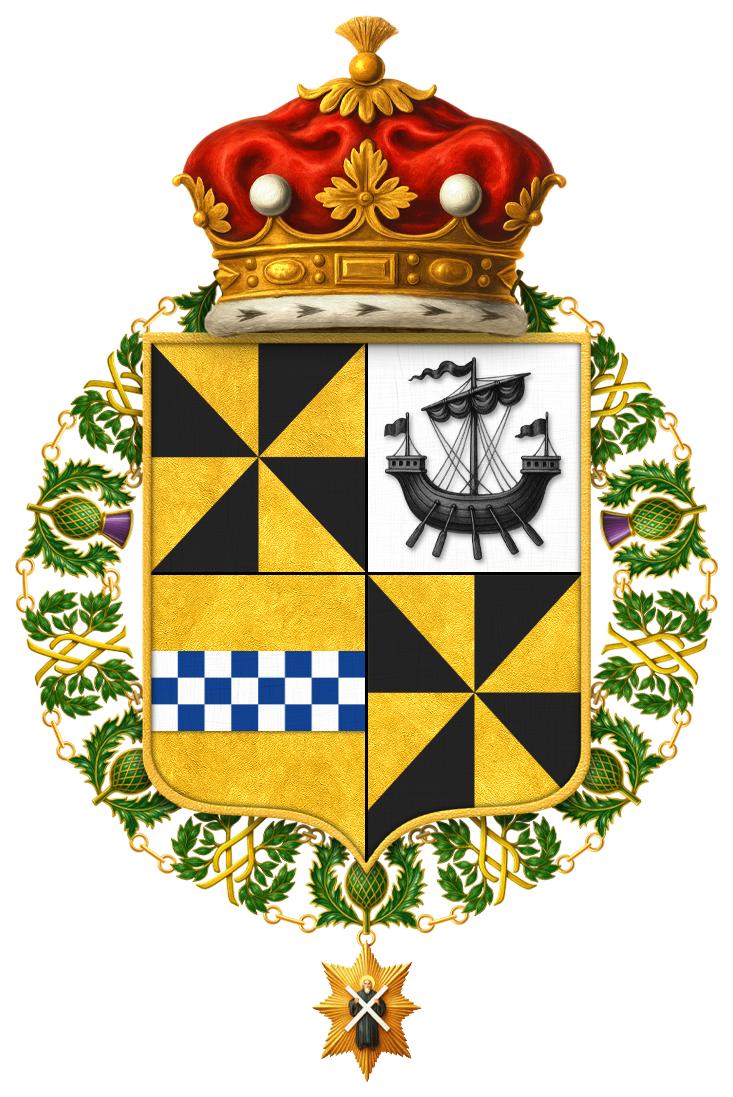
Shield of Arms of John Campbell, 2nd Marquess of Breadalbane, KT, PC, FRS, FSA

John Campbell, 2nd Marquess of Breadalbane, KT, PC, FRS, FSA (26 October 1796 – 8 November 1862), styled Lord Glenorchy until 1831 and as Earl of Ormelie from 1831 to 1834, was a British Liberal politician.

== Background and education ==
Born at Dundee, Angus, Breadalbane was the son of Lieutenant-General John Campbell, 1st Marquess of Breadalbane, and Mary, daughter of David Gavin. He was educated at Eton.

== Political career ==
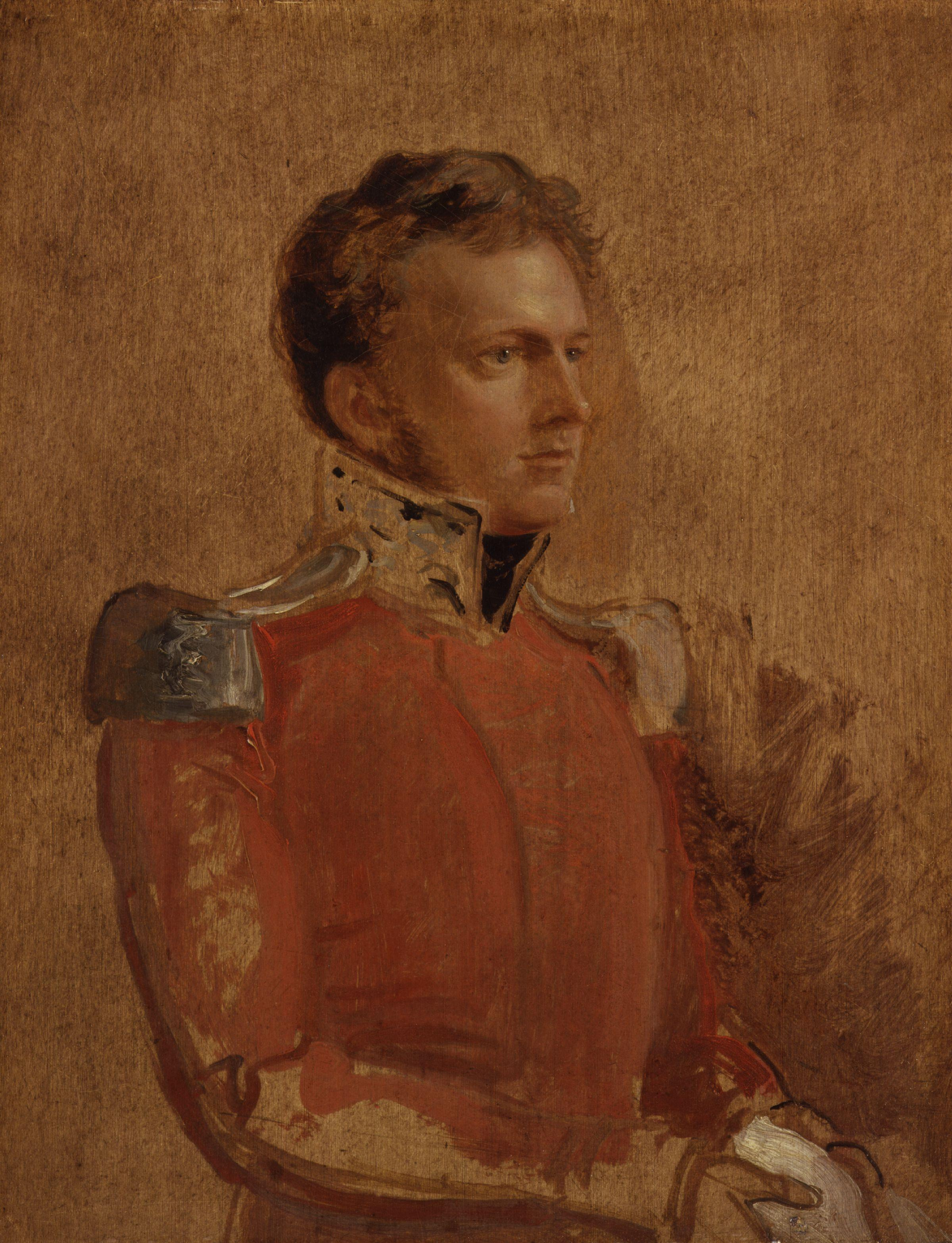
Portrait of John Campbell by George Hayter for the painting of The First Meeting of the Reformed House of Parliament in 1833

Breadalbane sat as Member of Parliament for Okehampton from 1820 to 1826 and for Perthshire from 1832 to 1834. The latter year he succeeded his father as second Marquess of Breadalbane and entered the House of Lords. In 1848 he was sworn of the Privy Council and appointed Lord Chamberlain of the Household by Lord John Russell, a post he held until the government fell in 1852. He held the same office under Lord Aberdeen between 1853 and 1855 and under Lord Palmerston between 1855 and 1858.

== Other public appointments ==
A freemason, Breadalbane was Grand Master of the Grand Lodge of Scotland between 1824 and 1826. He was elected a Fellow of the Royal Society in 1834 and made a Knight of the Thistle in 1838. The following year he was appointed Lord Lieutenant of Argyllshire (and Colonel of the Argyll and Bute Militia), a post he held until his death. In 1842 he entertained Queen Victoria and the Prince Consort at Taymouth Castle.

He was a supporter of the Free Church of Scotland during the Disruption of 1843.

Breadalbane was also Rector of the University of Glasgow between 1840 and 1842 and of Marischal College, Aberdeen, between 1843 and 1845, President of the Society of Antiquaries between 1844 and 1862 and Governor of the Bank of Scotland between 1861 and 1862. In 1861 he was sent on a special diplomatic mission to Berlin for the investiture of King William I in the Order of the Garter. He was appointed a Knight of the Order of the Black Eagle of Prussia at the same time.

== Personal life ==
Lord Breadalbane married Elizabeth Baillie ("Eliza") (born 29 June 1803, daughter of George Baillie and his wife Mary - daughter of Sir James Pringle - and sister of George Baillie-Hamilton, 10th Earl of Haddington) on 29 June 1821. They had no children. She was a Lady of the Bedchamber to Queen Victoria from January to July 1839. She died in Park Lane, London, on 28 August 1861, aged 58. Lord Breadalbane survived her by just over a year and died at Lausanne, Switzerland, on 8 November 1862, aged 66. On his death the barony of Breadalbane, earldom of Ormelie and marquessate of Breadalbane became extinct. He was succeeded in the lordship of Glenorchy, viscountcy of Tay and Paintland and earldom of Breadalbane and Holland by his distant relative and namesake, John Campbell. The marquessate was revived in favour of the latter's son in 1885.

Lord Breadalbane's sister Mary Campbell married Richard Temple-Nugent-Brydges-Chandos-Grenville, 2nd Duke of Buckingham and Chandos in 1819, with Richard inheriting the Dukedom in 1839. Breadalbane's and Mary's father the 1st Marquess was a trustee of a marriage settlement made for the union at the time of the wedding.

Included in the settlement, was an interest in the Hope Plantation in St. Andrew, Jamaica, which had come down from Anne the Duchess of Chandos, the wife of the 3rd Duke of Chandos from the previous century. In the aftermath of the Slavery Abolition Act 1833 with the Slave Compensation Act 1837, Mary's father-in-law, the 1st Duke of Buckingham and Chandos made a claim for compensation, "T71/865 St Andrew claim no. 114", comprising 379 slaves in Jamaica. The claim was denied, as the ownership was determined to be part of the marriage settlement, but a £6,630 payment was awarded to the 1st Marquess of Breadalbane and Hon. George Neville Grenville as joint Trustees, at the time (worth £682,320 in 2025). However, the papers note that the 1st Marquess had died in 1834, two years before the award was made, and so it is concluded that the 2nd Marquess was the awardee, though it is possible that the identity of the trustee was confused. However executed, the beneficiary of the payment was the 2nd Marquess' nephew, the 2nd Duke of Buckingham and Chandos, when the latter came into his inheritance.

Parliament of the United Kingdom
Preceded by Albany Savile; The Lord Dunalley	Member of Parliament for Okehampton; 1820–1826; With: The Lord Dunalley 1819–24; William Trant 1824–26	Succeeded by Sir Compton Domvile; Joseph Strutt
Preceded by Sir George Murray	Member of Parliament for Perthshire; 1832–1834	Succeeded by Sir George Murray
Political offices
Preceded by The Earl Spencer	Lord Chamberlain of the Household; 1848–1852	Succeeded by The Marquess of Exeter
Preceded by The Marquess of Exeter	Lord Chamberlain of the Household; 1853–1858	Succeeded by The Earl De La Warr
Masonic offices
Preceded by The Duke of Argyll	Grand Master of the Grand Lodge of Scotland; 1824–1826	Succeeded by The Earl of Kinnoull
Honorary titles
Preceded by The Duke of Argyll	Lord Lieutenant of Argyllshire; 1839–1862	Succeeded by The Duke of Argyll
Academic offices
Preceded by Sir James Graham	Rector of the University of Glasgow; 1840—1842	Succeeded by Hon. Fox Maule-Ramsay
Preceded by Sir James McGrigor, Bt	Rector of Marischal College, Aberdeen; 1843–1845	Succeeded by Sir Archibald Alison
Peerage of the United Kingdom
Preceded by John Campbell	Marquess of Breadalbane; 1834–1862	Extinct
Peerage of Scotland
Preceded by John Campbell	Earl of Breadalbane; 1834–1862	Succeeded by John Campbell
