= Alexander Maclean, 13th Laird of Ardgour =

Alexander Maclean, 13th Laird of Ardgour (16 April 1764 – 8 September 1855) was a soldier and Highland Laird.

== Life ==
He was the son of Hugh, 12th MacLean of Ardgour (1736-4 September 1768) and Elizabeth, daughter of Alexander Houston of Jordan Hill.

He entered the army as an ensign in the 2nd battalion of the 'Royals' in 1780, and was promoted to a lieutenancy in the same corps, from which he afterwards exchanged into the 63rd (West Suffolk) Regiment of Foot. He subsequently attained the rank of captain and major in the 8th Regiment of Light Dragoons (later the 8th King's Royal Irish Hussars).

After leaving the regular service, he became a captain in the Hopetoun Fencibles (7th regiment of fencibles) sometime between 2 February 1793 to 1799 under James, the 3rd Earl of Hopetoun. On 29 May 1795, he was appointed Major in the Fencible cavalry of the Lothian (East and West) Regiment. He was Lt-Col of the Argyll Additional Battalion of Volunteers in 1803, and was subsequently appointed, circa 1811, Lt-Col of the 3rd Battalion, Argyllshire Local Militia, the command of which he held until the regiment was disbanded in 1816.

He was an avid horseman and rode in the Royal Caledonian Hunt, amongst whose members was Robert Burns.

In June 1805 he was appointed Receiver General of Landrents, Paymaster of the Civil Establishment and Receiver General of the land tax, and assessed taxes in Scotland. This was apparently under the patronage of John, 2nd Earl of Hopeton, his brother-in-law, on a salary of £1,500. Just a year later, in June 1806, he was succeeded by Sir William A. Cunynghame of Milncraig (formerly of Livingston), Bart.

He gifted the site of Ardgour Church in 1826, which is still the centre of local worship. It was built by Thomas Telford in 1829, one of forty-two in the Highlands which were part of a Parliamentary Project for The Church of Scotland.

Alexander became blind several years before his death in 1855, and was buried in Cill Mhoadain Graveyard, Ardgour alongside his wife. Alexander was succeeded by his fourth son, Alexander Maclean, 14th MacLean of Ardgour.

== Family ==
He married Lady Margaret Hope, who died 16 September 1831, daughter of Sir John Hope, 2nd Earl of Hopetoun, and by her had issue:

Hugh, who died in infancy.
John Hugh Maclean FRSE (1796-1826), educated at the Scottish bar, and died in Rome
Archibald, who died in Edinburgh in 1832 after having served as a naval officer; severely wounded; captured by the American war vessel, Prince de Neufchatel; and in 1822, promoted to the rank of captain and commander of HMS Blossom of twenty-six guns.
Alexander, heir and successor.
Henry Dundas entered the army, became a major in 1832, and at different periods was resident governor of Ithaca, Cephalonia, Santa Maura, and Lante; died in 1863.
James Charles entered the military service of the East India Company, and died of fever at Calcutta in 1829.
Charles Hope was educated for the English bar, and died in 1839.
Elizabeth Margaret.
Charlotte Margaret died in 1824.
Thomas entered the East India Company's service, and died in 1840.
William entered the navy, changed his name to Gunston, and died in 1851.
George became a colonel in the army, and married, in 1842, a daughter of Sir Colin Campbell.
Robert died in 1835.
Peter, who served in the artillery and rose to the rank of Major-General, married, in Graham's Town, Cape of Good Hope, a daughter of Lieutenant General Sir Henry Somerset, by whom he had four sons and three daughters.
