= 148th Siege Battery, Royal Garrison Artillery =

148th Siege Battery, RGA
- Cap Badge of the Royal Regiment of Artillery
- Active: 29 May 1916–1919
- Country: United Kingdom
- Branch: British Army
- Role: Siege Artillery
- Part of: Royal Garrison Artillery
- Garrison/HQ: Harwich
- Engagements: Battle of the Somme; Battle of Vimy Ridge; Battle of Messines; Third Battle of Ypres; Hundred Days Offensive

148th Siege Battery was a heavy howitzer unit of Britain's Royal Garrison Artillery (RGA) raised in Essex and Suffolk during World War I. It saw active service on the Western Front at the Somme, Vimy Ridge, Messines and Ypres, and in the final Allied Hundred Days Offensive.

== Mobilisation ==
On the outbreak of war in August 1914, units of the part-time Territorial Force (TF) were invited to volunteer for Overseas Service and the majority of the Essex and Suffolk Royal Garrison Artillery did so. This unit had mobilised as part of No 14 (Essex & Suffolk) Coastal Fire Command at Landguard Fort, charged with defending the Haven ports of Harwich, Felixstowe and Ipswich and the associated naval base. By October 1914, the campaign on the Western Front was bogging down into Trench warfare and there was an urgent need for batteries of siege artillery to be sent to France. The WO decided that the TF coastal gunners were well enough trained to take over many of the duties in the coastal defences, releasing Regular RGA gunners for service in the field. Soon the TF RGA companies that had volunteered for overseas service were also supplying trained gunners to RGA units serving overseas and providing cadres to form complete new units.

In August 1915 Harwich was chosen as one of the depots for forming these units, under the command of Major G.W. Horsfield of the Essex & Suffolk RGA.The rest of the personnel were returning wounded Regulars, men of the Special Reserve, 'Kitchener's Army' volunteers and 'Lord Derby men'.

148th Siege Battery, RGA, was raised at Harwich under Army Council Instruction 1091 of 29 May 1916 with a cadre of 4 officers and 78 other ranks (ORs) – approximately a TF RGA company – from the Essex & Suffolk RGA.

== Western Front ==
=== Somme ===
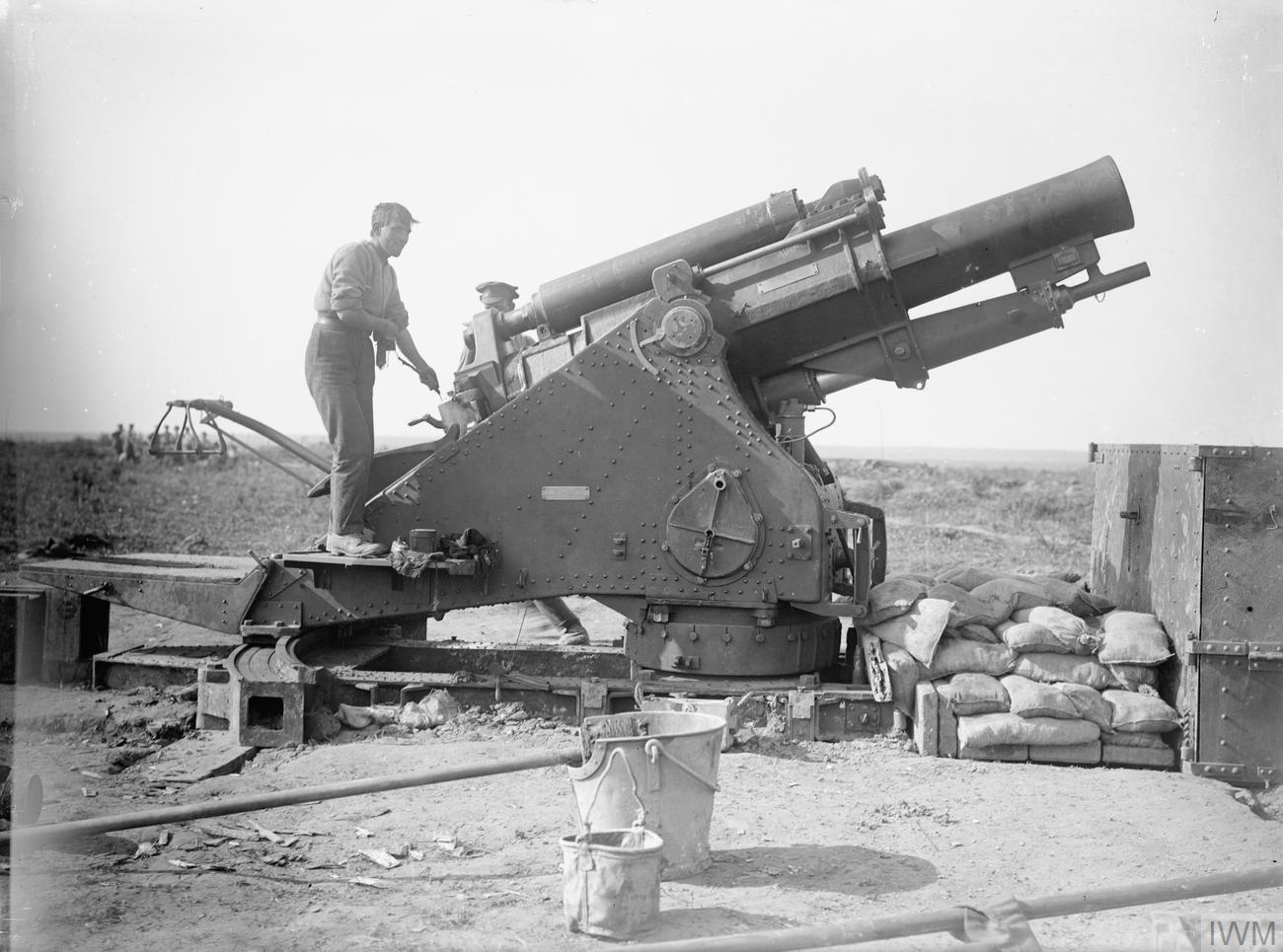
9.2-inch howitzer in action on the Somme, 1916.

The battery went out to the Western Front in August 1916, manning four 9.2-inch howitzers, and initially joined XIII Corps' Heavy Artillery. XIII Corps had been heavily engaged in the early part of the Battle of the Somme and was in the process of being relieved, so the battery was transferred to 33rd HAG under Fourth Army HQ.

XIV Corps took over the line from XIII Corps, and continued the Battle of Delville Wood with a carefully-planned attack towards Guillemont. Zero hour was fixed for 14.45 on 18 August and was preceded by a 36-hour methodical bombardment; the rate of fire was not to quicken before the assault so that the enemy would receive no warning. The infantry were then to advance to the first objective behind a curtain of fire provided by the lighter field artillery. There was then to be a 2-hour pause for consolidation while a fresh bombardment was fired at the second objective. The right attack was held up, but good progress was made on the left, where Waterlot Farm and Lonely Trench were captured and consolidated. Fighting continued in Delville Wood, with XIV Corps making a fresh attacks on 3 September (the Guillemont) for which the bombardment had begun at 08.00 the previous day. In the centre the German positions had suffered badly from the bombardment and were quickly taken, but the right attack was a disaster. The attack was renewed next morning and by 6 September Guillemont and most of the other objectives had been captured. XIV Corps then prepared to capture Ginchy on 9 September. The bombardment began at 07.00 with no increase in intensity before Zero at 16.45 to deceive the Germans as to the time of the attack and to deny them an opportunity to counter-attack before dark. The village was taken after heavy fighting, and trench fighting continued in front of the village for several days.

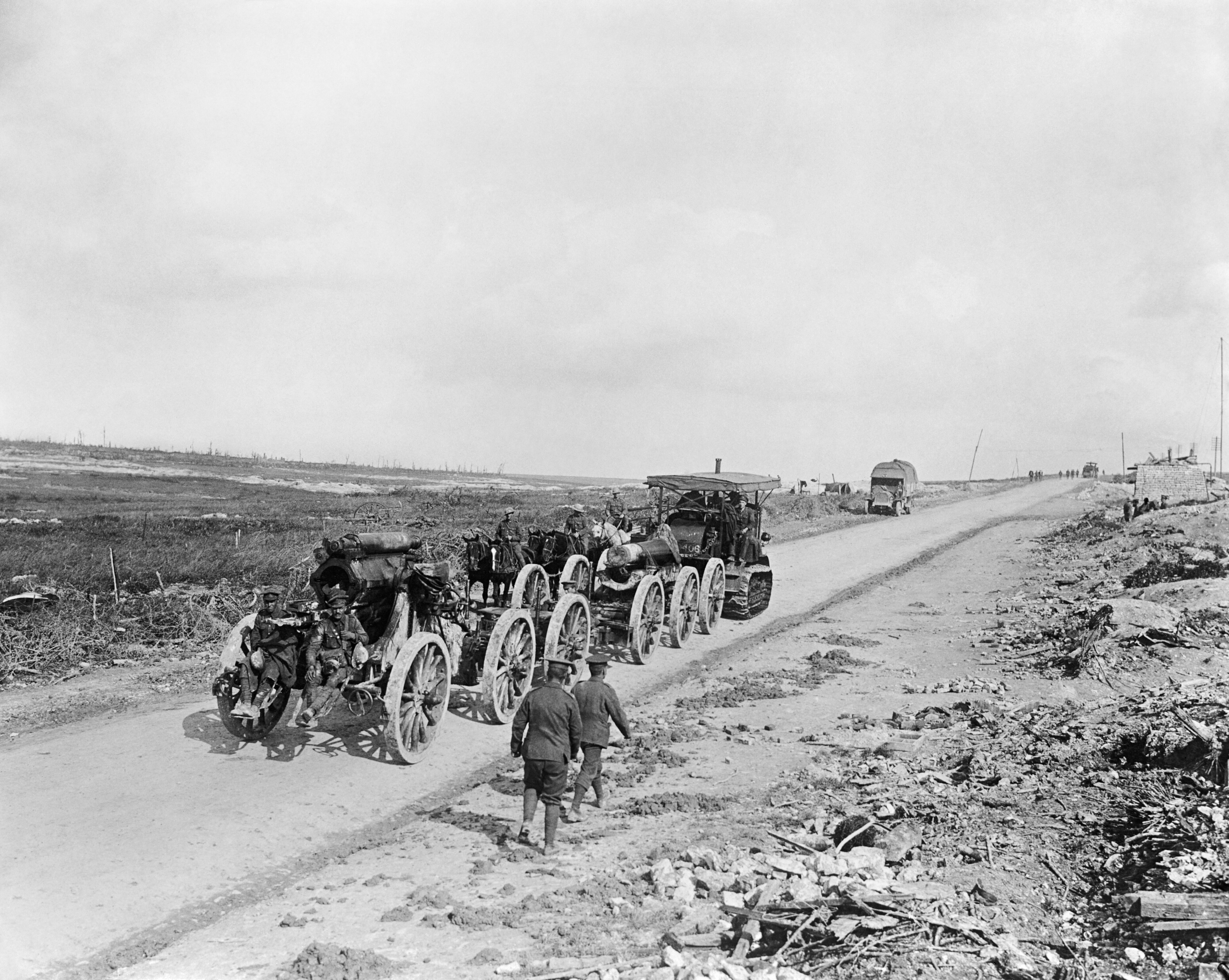
A Holt caterpillar tractor hauling a 9.2-inch howitzer on the Somme, summer 1916.

Fourth Army's heavy artillery was massed for the Battle of Flers–Courcelette beginning on 15 September, but there was no space to move the heavies forward. The bombardment began on 12 September, with daily firing from 06.00 to 18.30 emphasising Counter-battery (CB) fire, and harassing fire (HF) at night. Each morning the bombardment began with a 'brisk' half hour, and Z day was no different, to maintain an element of surprise. XIV Corps' infantry crossed the Combles Ravine, but did not get beyond their first or second objectives and failed to take the Quadrilateral, a strongpoint on a reverse slope that the bombardment had missed. Over following days the heavy artillery continued to pound the objectives that had not yet been taken – the Quadrilateral fell on 18 September after an accurate bombardment – and minor operations were carried out to prepare for the next major attack (the Battle of Morval). Poor visibility hindered artillery observation, particularly for CB fire, but the attack on 25 September was well served by the guns. The infantry advanced methodically and captured Morval and Lesbœufs, followed by Combles next day.

On 1 October a deliberate bombardment was opened along the whole Fourth Army front at 07.00, which continued without increase in the rate of fire until Zero (15.15) when the Battle of the Transloy Ridges was launched. XIV Corps played a minor part in the attack, but took advantage of the hour's intensive bombardment from 15.15 to make some minor advances. But heavy rain and mud made it difficult to serve the guns as the battle continued. 31st HAG HQ moved in on 5 October to take over command of a group of siege batteries including 148th as the fighting continued on the Transloy Ridges. The bombardments and CB work continued, with frequent breakdowns to the worn guns. 31st HAG's batteries bombarded Le Transloy village for the attack on 23 October, but the infantry formations were very weak and made only minor gains. Zenith Trench was captured on 29 October after it was bombarded by 148th and other batteries.

The end of the fighting on the Transloy Ridges also marked the end of XIV Corps' participation in the Somme Offensive. 31st HAG HQ left at the end of the month and 148th Siege Bty was transferred to 49th HAG on 29 October. At the time, the battery was at Guillemont. The battery commander, Major George Hugh-Jones (originally of the Essex & Suffolk RGA), was wounded on 4 November and Capt A.N. Street took command. 148th Siege Bty came under 28th HAG on 2 December. There was some firing on most days, when weather permitted observation. The battery's regular targets included Sunken Trench and hostile batteries and strongpoints around Le Transloy. It was temporarily attached to 64th HAG while 28th HAG HQ and several of the other batteries went to a rest camp in January 1917. Routine CB and HF fire continued in the new year, with an increasing number of short destructive bombardments of specific trenches.

=== Vimy ===
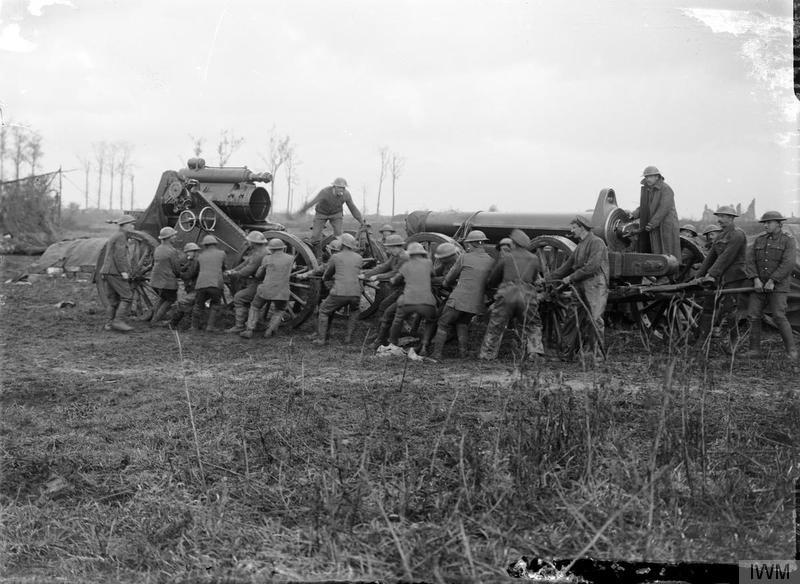
Moving a 9.2-inch howitzer on its travelling carriage, 1917.

The Left half-battery of 148th Siege Bty pulled out on 14 March 1917 for a move north, the rest following on 23 March. It officially joined 53rd HAG with First Army on 21 March. First Army was preparing for the Arras Offensive, with 53rd HAG deployed at Mont-Saint-Éloi supporting Canadian Corps in the opening Battle of Vimy Ridge. Left half battery was in action on 29 March and the whole of 148th Siege Bty was in position by 1 April to participate in the preparations. Its targets included the Ecole Commune, Spandau House, Thélus, Farbus and Vimy village, as well as specific trenches and dugouts. The attack went in at 05.30 on 9 April behind a heavy barrage: 148th Siege Bty laid a barrage on Bloater Trench and the roads behind the Ecole Commune. The Canadians overran three lines of German trenches and seized the crest of the ridge. That afternoon the battery was able to fire at enemy infantry on the move and against a hostile battery to prevent them interfering. Firing continued until 14 April as the Canadians consolidated the captured ground and carried out a limited exploitation.

On 15 April the battery officially came under 64th HAG, but there was no firing. On 24 April the Right half-battery took up new positions on the Lens–Arras road, targeting Arleux for the next phase of the offensive (the Battle of Arleux) and also carrying out wire-cutting for the infantry. The assault went in on 28 April but was not as successful as the earlier attacks. The battery then switched to targets at Fresnoy and Acheville for the Third Battle of the Scarpe on 3 May. After the initial barrage, the battery fired at German infantry moving up to counter-attack, causing many casualties. On 5 May the battery was firing at Oppy village when a German shell hit one of the ammunition dumps at the battery position, destroying a large number of cartridges. Fighting on this sector of the offensive died away thereafter, but the battery remained active, firing at Acheville Church, the brewery, and various trenches and machine gun posts, as well as feint barrages and at targets of opportunity. By now the guns were badly worn and needed recalibration, while one was sent to the workshops and the battery temporarily took over a gun of 1st Canadian Siege Bty. By 12 May three of the four guns were in the workshops, and the remaining one was put out of action by enemy CB fire that damaged the gun cradle and destroyed a great deal of ammunition. Only the Canadian gun could now be used, while the rest of the battery was pulled out.

=== Messines ===
On 17 May the battery reverted to 53rd HAG, now under IX Corps, and moved to new positions at Loker, south-west of Ypres, where Second Army was gathering artillery for the Battle of Messines. From 27 May Right half-battery of 148th Siege Bty began registering its guns on Bogaert Farm and Huns Farm near Wytschaete and on dugouts; Left half-battery joined in on 31 May against Box House. By 3 June the batteries were firing practice barrages and demonstrations to confuse the enemy. The bombardment continued until the assault went in on 7 June, following the explosion of huge mines. The results of the limited attack were spectacular, with the whole Messines–Wytschaete Ridge being captured. In the IX Corps area, the 36th (Ulster) Division captured the wreckage of two woods and Bogaert Farm in between, finding that 'the ground about the strongpoints had been literally ploughed up by the bursts of the high-explosive shells during the bombardment; the barbed wire entanglements which had protected this are below the crest lay piled in twisted heaps, and everywhere was the wreckage of once solidly built dugouts and shelters'.

=== Ypres ===
The British artillery was repositioned after the battle, 148th Siege Bty pulling out on 10 June to join II Corps in the Dikkebus area with Fifth Army, where it joined 66th HAG on 17 June. On 22 June 356th Siege Battery joined II Corps. This battery had been raised at Harwich from a nucleus provided by details of the Essex & Suffolk RGA. It arrived with four new Mark II 9.2-inch howitzers, which it was ordered to hand over to 148th Siege Bty. 356th Siege Bty was then split up to reinforce other batteries, including 76th Siege Bty, also formed by the Essex & Suffolk RGA.

Fifth Army HQ had been brought to the Ypres Salient to carry out the planned Flanders offensive (the Third Battle of Ypres). Although the preliminary bombardment had begun on 12 June, the Germans had air superiority and better OPs, and the British artillery in the Salient received considerable CB fire. However, the British build-up continued and as time went by the guns began to get the upper hand, with the full artillery preparation beginning on 16 July. The delayed attack (the Battle of Pilckem Ridge) was launched on 31 July. II Corps had the hardest task, and it received the heaviest German retaliatory fire; its divisions made little progress through the shattered woods onto the plateau in front of them. Deadlocked, the corps was unable to continue towards its second and third objectives. Heavy rain in the evening halted any further moves.

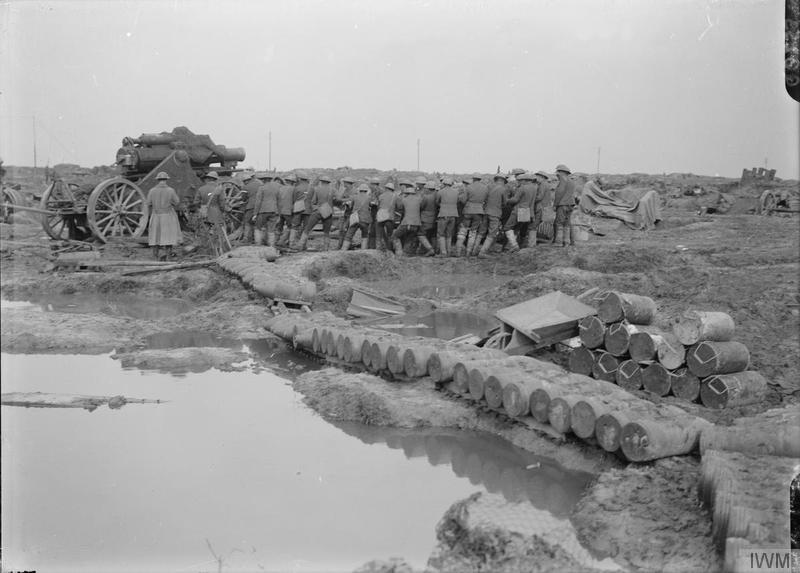
Positioning a 9.2-inch howitzer and its ammunition in the mud of the Ypres Salient, 1917.

During August the batteries of 66th HAG continued CB work for II Corps as the massed guns prepared the way for the next assault (the Battle of Langemarck) on 16 August. This was a failure and resulted in heavy casualties.

As the Ypres offensive bogged down, Second Army took over its direction in September. 66th HAG continued CB work, now as a double group with 35th HAG. The attack on Glencorse Wood and Nonne Boschen Wood by 1st Australian Division on 20 September supported by 66th HAG during the Battle of the Menin Road Ridge was successful because the objectives were limited and the heavy artillery support was overwhelming. 66th HAG's batteries continued their CB fire for I ANZAC Corps' attack on Gheluvelt on 4 October (the Battle of Broodseinde).

But as the offensive continued with the Battle of Poelcappelle and First and Second Battles of Passchendaele, the tables were turned: British batteries were clearly observable from the Passchendaele Ridge and were subjected to hostile CB fire, while their own guns sank into the mud and became difficult to move and fire. To be able to supply them with ammunition the heavy guns had to stay strung out one behind the other along the few available roads, making them an easy target.

=== Winter 1917–18 ===
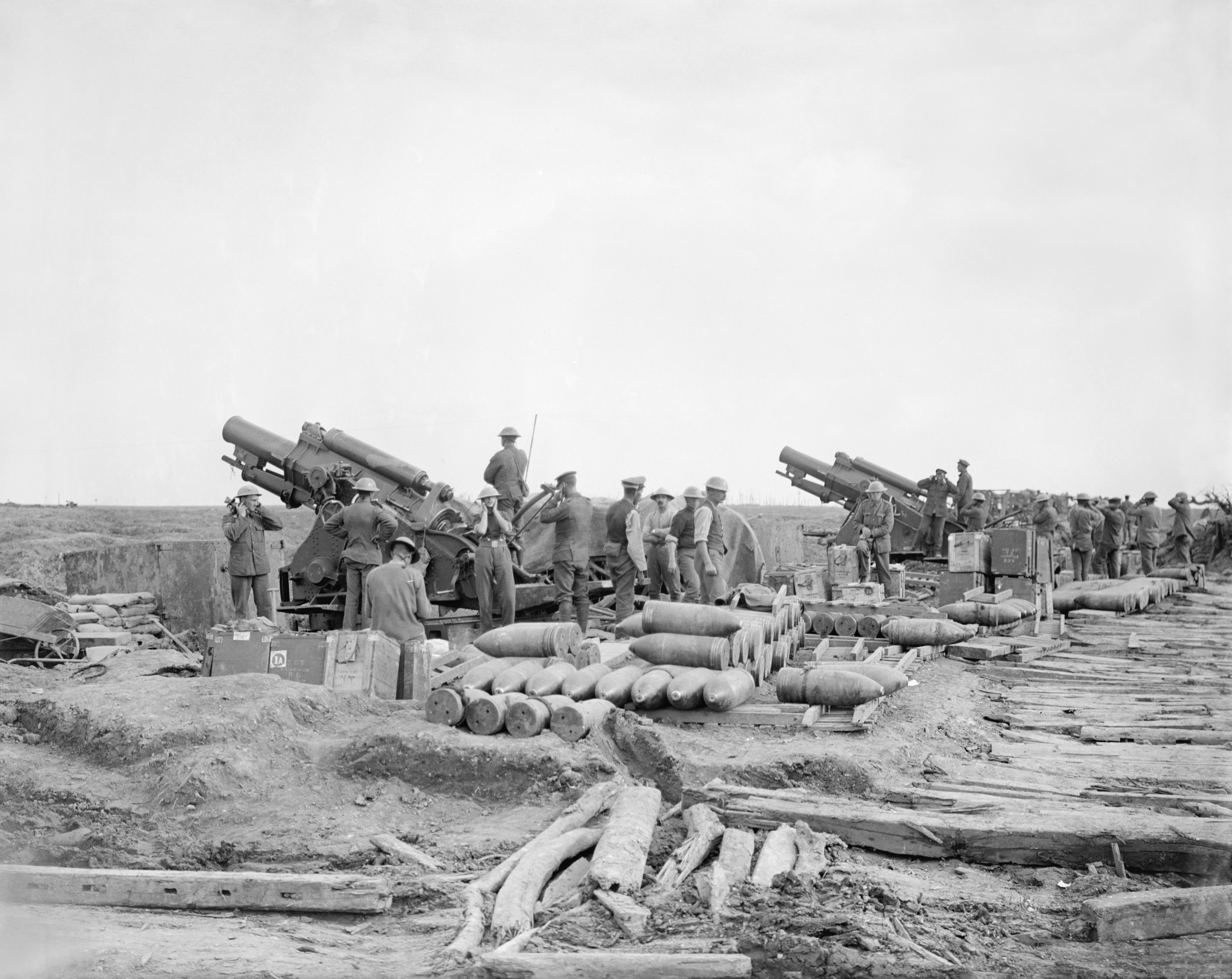
Section of 9.2-inch howitzers in action, October 1917.

The heavy artillery was reorganised on 17 October, 66th HAG going to another corps, and 148th Siege Bty coming under 22nd HAG. CB shoots in conjunction with observation aircraft continued until 22 November when 22nd HAG was reorganised as a bombardment group. 148th Siege Bty (by now at rest following the end of the offensive) transferred back to 28th HAG under II ANZAC Corps. Despite the appalling conditions, Corps HQ ordered 28th HAG to move up and maintain as many guns as possible in action for CB tasks, though as the German activity was lower than normal there were few calls to neutralise enemy batteries. However, 148th Siege Bty took several days to remount one of its 9.2s at Bellewaarde Lake, being impeded by fire from an enemy 5.9-inch howitzer, which damaged the gun's baseplate and carriage on 26 November and damaged it again two days later. December was quiet, apart from a few minor operations on the front.

By now HAG allocations were becoming more fixed, and they were converted into permanent RGA brigades. 28th Brigade, which changed its designation on 23 December 1917, was defined as a Mixed Brigade, with guns and howitzers of several sizes. 148th Siege Bty remained with this brigade until the Armistice.

=== Spring Offensive ===
The German Spring Offensive was launched against Third and Fifth Armies on 21 March 1918. Second Army despatched reinforcements to help, including 28th Bde, but the 9.2s were deemed too slow: 148th Siege Bty took over the guns of 188th Siege Bty and was then left at Ypres under II Corps in the northernmost part of the Ypres Salient while the rest of the batteries moved out by road. The second phase of the German offensive (the Battle of the Lys was launched in early April and 28th Bde was involved in the fighting with some of its batteries under the tactical command of 51st (Highland) Division. 148th Siege Bty probably rejoined at this time, because a number of casualties from the battery killed on 28 April are buried in La Kreule Military Cemetery at Hazebrouck.

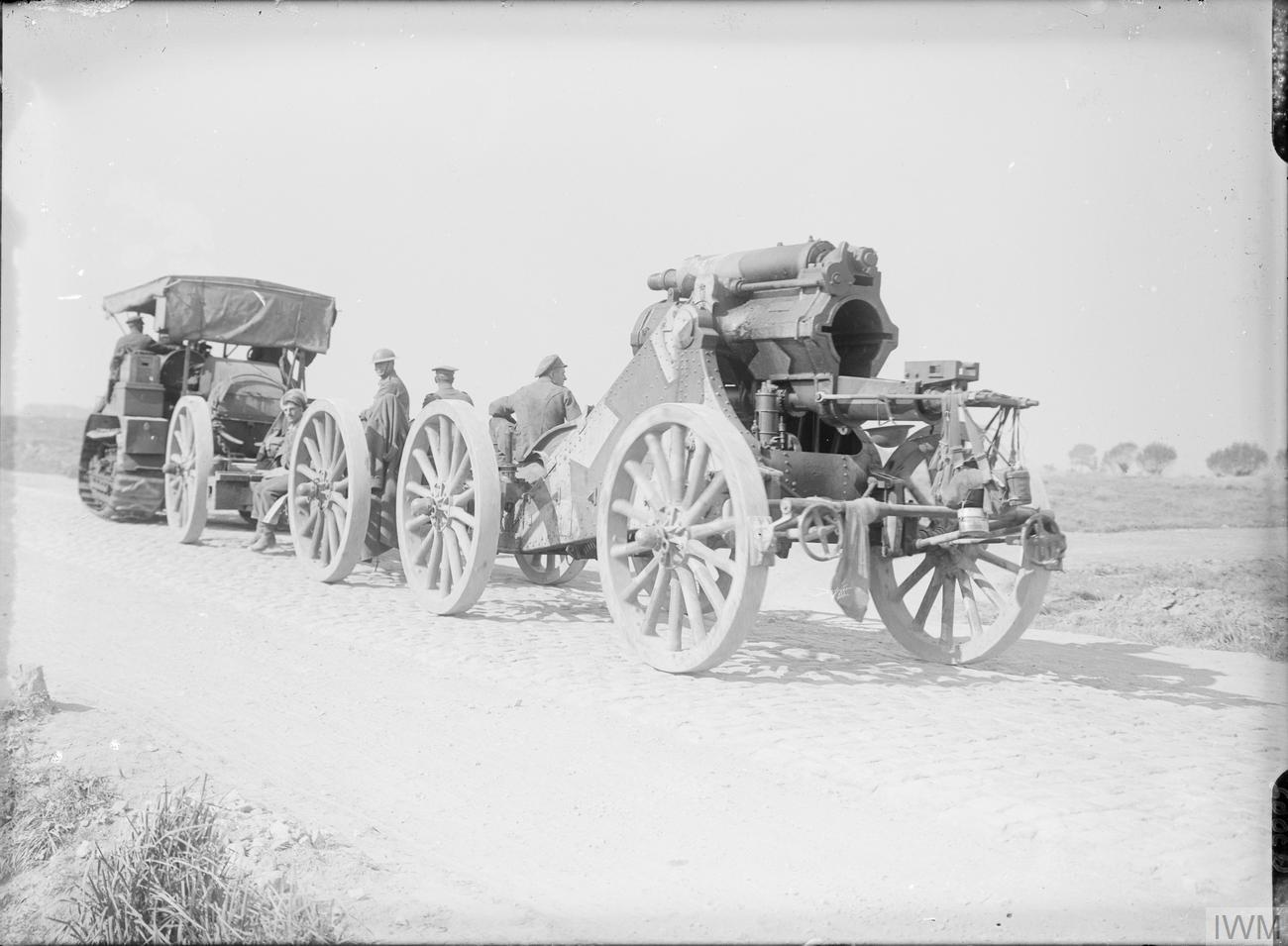
9.2-inch howitzer broken down into three loads for road movement.

=== Hundred Days Offensive ===
It was not until the summer, after the German offensives had been halted, that 28th Bde fully re-assembled on 31 July, with its batteries deployed in the Forêt de Nieppe under command of XI Corps in the reconstituted Fifth Army. On 7 August, the day before the Allies began their final Hundred Days Offensive with the Battle of Amiens, the German made a withdrawal in front of XI Corps. 28th Brigade carried out numerous harassing fire (HF) tasks and established forward observation posts (OPs). On 9 August a section of 148th Siege Bty moved forward. By 18 August there were indications that the Germans intended a significant withdrawal on the Lys sector, and 148th Siege Bty moved forward again, in front of the forest. By the end of August the Germans had retired to Estaires, and then in September went back to the Aubers Ridge where they solidified their position. 148th Siege Bty carried out some training, and then on 9 September was sent to support XIII Corps.

Fifth Army began moving forwards again in early October after the battles of the Canal du Nord and St Quentin Canal. During this advance the 'heavies' were mainly used for HF tasks on the enemy's roads and tracks, and for concentrations on headquarters and the exits of villages. The enemy withdrew to the Escaut in mid-October. By now the offensive had turned into a pursuit, and many of the heavy batteries had to be left behind waiting for roads and bridges to be rebuilt. Fifth Army prepared to make an assault on the Escaut on 11 November, but the Germans retreated out of reach on 8 November. Hostilities were ended on 11 November by the Armistice with Germany.

== Disbandment ==
28th Brigade was still with Fifth Army at the time of the Armistice. 148th Siege Bty caught up with it at Templeuve on 13 November. It then moved to Beugin, and education courses began for men awaiting demobilisation.

148th Siege Bty was designated 116th Bty in 29th Bde RGA in the interim order of battle published on 21 May 1919, but this was scrapped after the signature of the Treaty of Versailles in June and the battery was officially disbanded. The Commonwealth War Graves Commission records 19 dead from 148th Siege Bty (there may be others where the battery is not specified).

== See also ==
- Newsreel film of a 9.2-inch howitzer being fired.
