= Fort Process =

Art festival in England

- Genre: Festival
- Locations: Newhaven Fort, Newhaven, East Sussex
- Country: United Kingdom
- Established: 2014
- Most recent: August 3, 2018; 8 years ago
- Major events: Sound art, experimental music, free improvisation, site-specific art
- Website: https://lost-property.org.uk/fortprocess/

Fort Process is a multi-disciplinary sonic arts festival set in Newhaven Fort, Newhaven on the south coast of England, produced by Lost Property. The festival takes place within the structure of the 19th century coastal defence, commissioning site-specific art installations and performances that respond to the fort's architecture and network of subterranean tunnels. The first edition was held in September 2014, with later editions in 2016 and 2018. The festival has been well received with positive reviews from The Wire, The Quietus, Freq and others.

The festival was initially conceived in 2012 by Alastair Kemp, founder of Newhaven's Eleusinian Press, who proposed the idea to a group of Brighton-based arts and music promoters. It was in response to East Sussex County Council announcing that Newhaven Fort would become privately run. The interested parties would form arts collective Lost Property to handle the festival's organisation.

Across its three editions, the festival has presented a wide range of artists and musicians, including: Sarah Angliss, Adam Basanta, Pierre Bastien, Mike Blow, Peter Brötzmann & Steve Noble, John Chantler, Rhys Chatham, Audrey Chen, Poulomi Desai, Leslie Deere, Timothy Didymus, Graham Dunning, Max Eastley, Ex-Easter Island Head, Michael Finnissy, Limpe Fuchs, Mariska de Groot, Ian Helliwell, Daniel W J Mackenzie, Darsha Hewitt, Konk Pack, Kyoka, Joshua Le Gallienne, Grischa Lichtenberger, Liminal, Toshimaru Nakamura, Seijiro Murayama, Evan Parker, Aura Satz, Semiconductor, Tim Shaw, Plurals, The Artaud Beats, Gabey Tjon a Tham, Tetsuya Umeda, Zimoun.
