= 1st Suffolk and Harwich Volunteer Artillery =

1st Suffolk & Harwich Volunteer Artillery Essex & Suffolk RGA Suffolk Heavy Brigade 514th (Suffolk) Coast Regiment 515th (Suffolk) Coast Regiment 572nd Coast Regiment 418 (Norfolk) HAA Regiment 419th (Suffolk) Coast Regiment
- Cap Badge of the Royal Regiment of Artillery (pre-1953)
- Active: 1 April 1899–1 May 1961
- Country: United Kingdom
- Branch: Territorial Force
- Role: Coast Artillery
- Part of: Royal Garrison Artillery
- Garrison/HQ: Dovercourt
- Engagements: World War I World War II

The 1st Suffolk & Harwich Volunteer Artillery, later the Essex & Suffolk Royal Garrison Artillery was an auxiliary coastal artillery unit of the British Army first raised in 1899. It defended the ports and naval bases (the Haven ports) around the estuaries of the Rivers Orwell and Stour. Although the unit saw no active service, it supplied trained gunners to siege batteries engaged on the Western Front during World War I. It was greatly expanded in World War II to defend the invasion-threatened East Anglian Coast from Harwich to Great Yarmouth. Postwar it continued in the coast and air defence roles until it disappeared in a series of amalgamations from the 1950s.

== Volunteer Force ==
The rise of the Volunteer movement following an invasion scare in 1859 saw the creation of many Rifle, Artillery and Engineer Volunteer Corps composed of part-time soldiers eager to supplement the Regular British Army in time of need. These developed into permanent auxiliary units in the later 19th Century. On 1 April 1899 two companies of the 1st Essex Artillery Volunteers based in the port of Harwich became the basis of a new unit recruited among the Haven ports straddling the Essex–Suffolk border, with one new battery at Ipswich and three at Felixstowe. Initially designated the 2nd Essex (Harwich) Volunteer Artillery it was soon renamed the 1st Suffolk & Harwich Volunteer Artillery in Eastern Division, Royal Artillery. From 1 June 1899 all volunteer artillery units were part of the Royal Garrison Artillery (RGA) and on 1 January 1902 they were redesignated, the Harwich unit becoming the 1st Suffolk & Harwich RGA (Volunteers). It now had eight companies, with its headquarters (HQ) at 6 Church Street in Harwich and No 3 Company detached at Felixstowe. From 1 July 1905 the unit was commanded by Lt-Col Arthur Churchman (later Lord Woodbridge) of the Ipswich-based W.A. & A.C. Churchman tobacco company and a former Mayor of Ipswich.

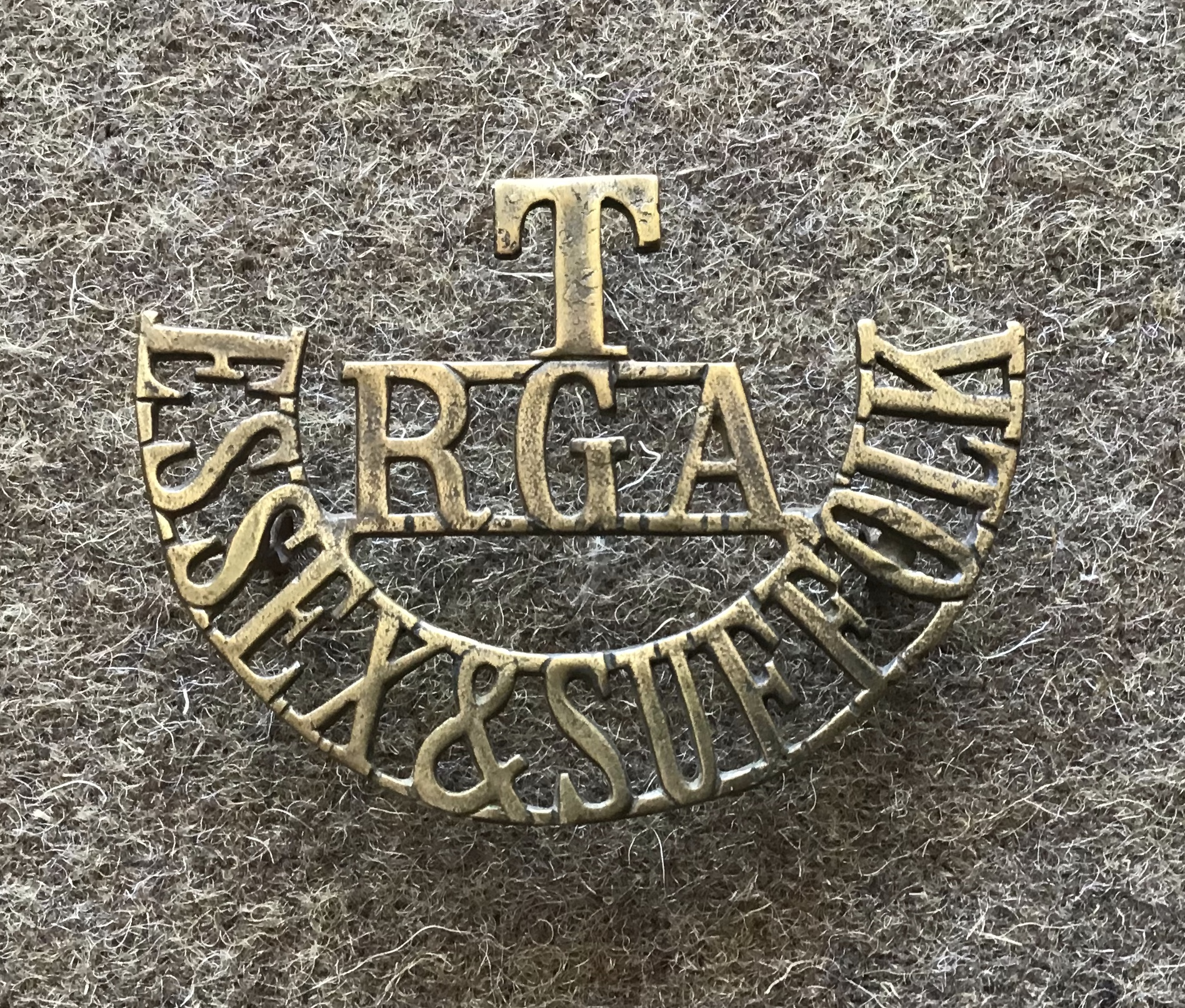
Unit shoulder title.

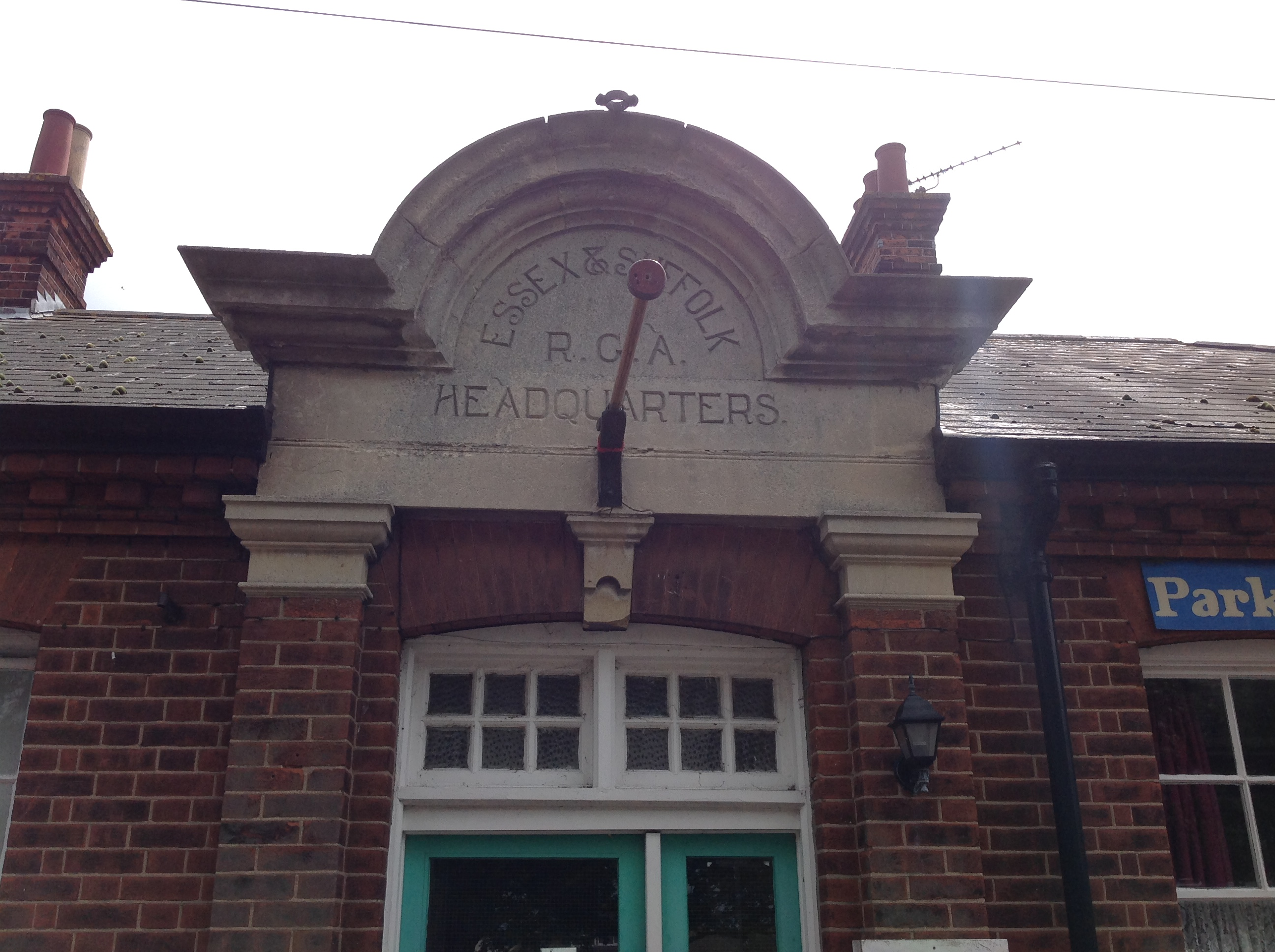
Entrance to the Headquarters of the Essex & Suffolk RGA, built at Dovercourt in 1911.

== Territorial Force ==
When the Volunteer Force was subsumed into the Territorial Force under the Haldane Reforms in 1908, the unit became the Essex and Suffolk Brigade, RGA, as a defended ports unit, with a new headquarters built at Dovercourt in 1911. By 1914 it was organised as follows:

- HQ at Dovercourt
- No 1 Company at Harwich
- No 2 Company at Stratford Green
- No 3 Company at York Road, Southend-on-Sea
- No 4 Company at the Drill Hall in Great Gipping Street, Ipswich

The responsibilities of the unit were split between the Defended Ports of Medway and Thames (two companies) and the Defended Port of Harwich (two companies), where in wartime they would man the guns alongside Regular RGA companies:

- Medway & Thames
  - Coalhouse Fort – 4 × 6-inch
- Harwich
  - Landguard Fort – 2 × 6-inch, 2 × 4.7-inch
  - Harwich – 2 × 6-inch, 2 × 4.7-inch

== World War I ==
=== Mobilisation ===
The Essex & Suffolk RGA mobilised in August 1914 on the outbreak of war. Shortly afterwards TF units were invited to volunteer for Overseas Service and on 15 August 1914, the War Office (WO) issued instructions to separate those men who had signed up for Home Service only, and form these into reserve units. On 31 August, the formation of a reserve or 2nd Line unit was authorised for each 1st Line unit where 60 per cent or more of the men had volunteered for Overseas Service. The titles of these 2nd Line units would be the same as the original, but distinguished by a '2/' prefix.

By October 1914, the campaign on the Western Front was bogging down into Trench warfare and there was an urgent need for batteries of Siege artillery to be sent to France. The WO decided that the TF coastal gunners were well enough trained to take over many of the duties in the coastal defences, releasing Regular RGA gunners for service in the field, and 1st line RGA companies that had volunteered for overseas service had been authorised to increase their strength by 50 per cent.

Although complete defended ports units never went overseas, they did supply trained gunners to RGA units serving overseas. They also provided cadres to form complete new units for front line service, thus the siege batteries formed in late 1915–early 1916 were a mixture of Regular and TF gunners from the RGA coast establishments with new recruits. In August 1915 Harwich was chosen as one of the depots for forming these units, under the command of Major G.W. Horsfield, officer commanding (OC) No 1 Company Essex & Suffolk RGA. The selected Territorials were sent to Beacon Hill Battery under Capt F.A.W. Cobbold (a member of Ipswich's Cobbold brewing family) of No 4 Company to begin their training. The first battery to be formed at Harwich, 76th Siege Battery, consisted of a half battery of men from the Essex & Suffolk RGA, drawn from all four companies, the remainder being returning wounded Regulars, men of the Special Reserve, and 'Kitchener's Army' volunteers. 90th Siege Battery, RGA was formed at Harwich on 1 December 1915. Although the relevant WO Instruction does not specifically mention this, it is recorded that half the men of the new battery were Essex Territorials, and the remainder Durham miners (presumably Kitchener volunteers). Thereafter four more siege batteries ordered to be formed at Harwich had cadres of four officers and 78 other ranks (ORs) drawn from the Essex & Suffolk RGA: 148, 220, 245 and 356 (see below). A large number of other siege batteries were formed at Harwich during the war (34, 119, 139, 166, 189, 229, 252, 264, 294, 300, 312) and although no TF cadres are specified, it is likely that the Essex & Suffolk RGA would have assisted in their organisation.

=== Home defence ===
This process meant a continual drain on the manpower of the defended ports units and under Army Council Instruction 686 of April 1917, the coastal defence companies of the RGA (TF) were reorganised. The Essex & Suffolk RGA serving in the Harwich and Shoeburyness Garrison was reduced from five remaining companies (1/1st, 1/4th, 2/1st, 2/3rd, 2/4th) to just three numbered 1–3. The 1st and 2nd Line TF distinction was dropped and they were to be kept up to strength with non-TF recruits. In April 1918 the Harwich Garrison comprised the following batteries under the control of No 14 (Essex & Suffolk) Coastal Fire Command based at Landguard Fort:

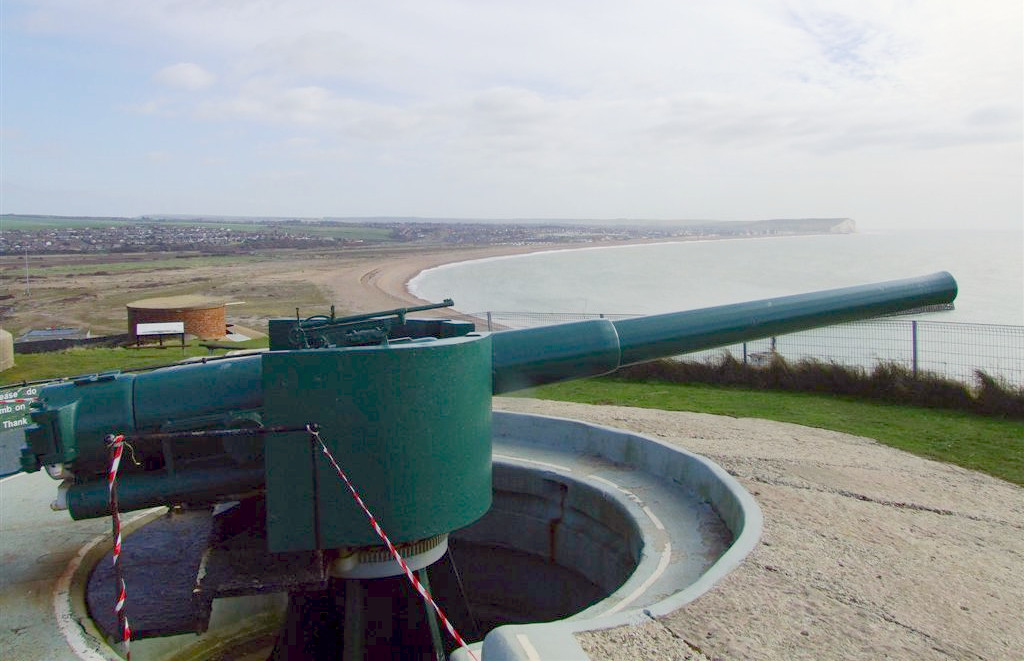
Mk VII 6-inch gun in typical coast defence emplacement, preserved at Newhaven Fort.

- Beacon Hill Battery No 1 – 2 × 6-inch Mk VII
- Beacon Hill Battery No 2 – 2 × 4.7-inch
- Landguard Battery – 2 × 6-inch Mk VII
- Darrell's Battery – 2 × 4.7-inch
- Brackenbury Battery – 2 × 9.2-inch Mk X
- Gorleston Battery – 1 × 15-pounder BLC gun

No 1 Company was based at Beacon Hill, No 2 at Brackenbury. These defences never saw action during the war. The TF was demobilised in 1919 after the Armistice with Germany and the Essex & Suffolk RGA entered suspended animation.

=== Western Front ===
==== 76th Siege Battery, RGA ====
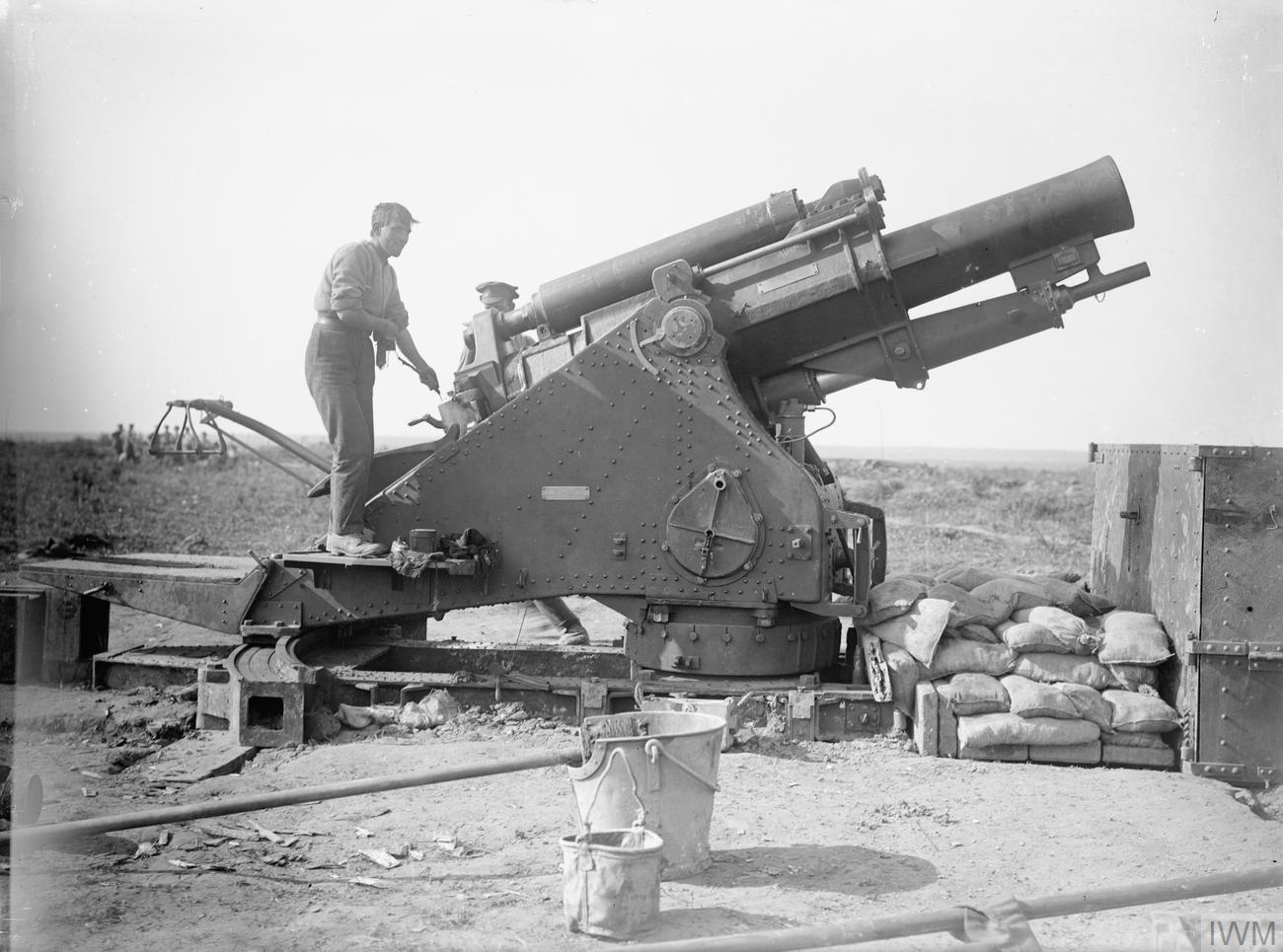
9.2-inch howitzer in action on the Somme, 1916.

In the words of the battery's historian, 'the history of No 76 Siege Battery is to a large extent bound up with that of the Essex and Suffolk R.G.A.'. On 3 November 1915 the half battery from Harwich travelled to Roffey Camp, Horsham, to join the other personnel from Clarence Barracks, Portsmouth under the command of Maj W.H. Brent Clark. Clark had been the Regular Army adjutant of the Essex & Suffolk before the war and had applied to transfer to the battery from command of 67th Siege Bty. After training at Lydd, the battery embarked for the Western Front equipped with four 9.2-inch howitzers.

The battery joined 25th Heavy Artillery Group (HAG) with Fourth Army, which was preparing for that year's 'Big Push' (the Battle of the Somme). 25th HAG supported 32nd and 36th (Ulster) Divisions, which were to attack Thiepval. The infantry went 'over the top' at 07.30 and the heavy artillery bombardment proceeded through its planned phases, lifting from one objective to the next. However, although one brigade of 36th (Ulster) Division had swept through the German positions opposite, the rest of the attack on Thiepval was held up. The guns were ordered to repeat part of the bombardment, but the advance could not be restarted, and counter-attacks drove the Ulstermen out of most of their gains.

The Somme Offensive continued through the summer and autumn, with 76th Siege Bty supporting the attacks on Pozières and Contalmaison. In September the battery was able to move one of its sections forward to support the attacks on Mouquet Farm ('Mucky Farm') and the Schwaben Redoubt. On 13 November the battery swung its howitzers round to fire on Beaumont-Hamel (the Battle of the Ancre), the capture of which ended the offensive.

There were minor operations on the Ancre Heights during January 1917, then in March the battery moved to the Arras sector where it supported Canadian Corps' successful attack on Vimy Ridge (9 April). The battery was then engaged during the Arras Offensive until it was moved to the Ypres Salient at the end of May. It played a minor role in the Battle of Messines, then joined 90th HAG for the opening of the Third Battle of Ypres. At the end of June the battery was brought up to a strength of six howitzers when it was joined by a section (2 officers and 32 ORs) from 356th Siege Bty, which had also been formed with a cadre from the Essex & Suffolk RGA (see below). But it also suffered serious casualties in the Salient, Maj Cobbold (who had succeeded to the command) being among those wounded).

The Ypres offensive opened with the Battle of Pilckem Ridge) on 31 July, but after initial successes the attack bogged down before the end of the day. The follow-up attack (the Battle of Langemarck) on 16 August was a failure. The Battles of the Menin Road (20 September) and Polygon Wood (26 September) were highly successful because of the weight of artillery brought to bear on German positions. But as the offensive continued the tables were turned: British batteries were clearly observable from the Passchendaele Ridge and were subjected to counter-battery CB fire, while their own guns sank into the mud and became difficult to aim and fire. 76th Siege Bty suffered serious casualties before it was finally rested in December.

76th Siege Bty joined 62nd HAG on 22 December. By now HAG allocations were becoming more fixed, and on 1 February 1918 they were converted into permanent RGA brigades. 62nd Brigade was defined as a Mixed Brigade, with guns and howitzers of several sizes. Apart from short periods of detachment, 76th Siege Bty remained with this brigade until the Armistice.

Early in 1918 62nd Bde moved south to join Third Army where its guns were hidden and remained silent until the launch of the German Spring Offensive on 21 March, when they immediately began firing pre-arranged 'SOS' barrages. German retaliation was heavy: the gun positions came under heavy fire of gas, shrapnel and High explosive shells, 76th battery commander was 's and the battery was ordered to pull out just ahead of the advancing Germans. It halted on 26 March after difficult 40 miles (64 km) retreat along roads crowded with retreating troops and civilians, and periodically under fire.

From April to July this part of the front was relatively quiet. Then Third Army entered the Allied Hundred Days Offensive. 76th Siege Bty caught up with 62nd Bde in time for the Battle of the Drocourt-Quéant Switch Line (2 September). Afterwards, the battery took up a very exposed position at Pronville-en-Artois, near Quéant, and after being heavily shelled and suffering numerous casualties had to move into the valley behind. It supported the attacks at the Battle of the Canal du Nord (27 September) and the Second Battle of Cambrai (8 October), at the end of which it had to cease fire because the enemy had retreated out of range. By now the offensive had turned into a pursuit, and many of the heavy batteries had to be left behind. 76th Siege Bty was billeted on the outskirts of Cambrai when hostilities were ended on 11 November by the Armistice with Germany.

As 1919 progressed 76th was reduced to a skeleton battery of officers and men who escorted the guns back to England in May. Although the battery was designated 104th Bty in 26th Bde RGA in the interim order of battle published on 21 May 1919, this was scrapped after the signature of the Treaty of Versailles in June and the battery was officially disbanded.

==== 148th Siege Battery, RGA ====
148th Siege Battery, RGA, was raised at Harwich under Army Council Instruction 1091 of 29 May 1916 with a cadre of 4 officers and 78 ORs – approximately a TF RGA company – from the Essex & Suffolk RGA. It went out to the Western Front in August 1916, manning four 9.2-inch howitzers, and joined Fourth Army, which was engaged in the continuing Somme Offensive. The battery was commanded for a period by Major George Hugh-Jones, who had first been commissioned into the 1st Suffolk & Harwich RGA in 1900. He was wounded in November 1916.

In March 1917 148th Siege Bty moved north to join the artillery supporting Canadian Corps at Vimy Ridge, and then the continuing Arras offensive. In May it went to Second Army for the Battle of Messines and afterwards to Fifth Army for the Ypres Offensive. In June it replaced its old guns by taking over the new Mark II howitzers that 356th Siege Bty had brought with them (see below). The battery supported II Corps at Pilckem Ridge, but the infantry were unable to reach their objectives. Like the other siege batteries at Ypres, 148th struggled to continue its CB work under appalling conditions.

During the winter 148th Siege Bty joined 28th HAG, later 28th Bde, and remained with it for the rest of the war. During the German Spring Offensive of 1918 the heavy howitzers of 148th Siege Bty were left behind when 28th Bde went south to reinforce the threatened front, but the brigade was reunited for the Hundred Days Offensive, taking part in Fifth Army's advance.

148th Siege Bty was designated 116th Bty in 29th Bde RGA in the 1919 interim order of battle, but was disbanded after this was scrapped.

==== 220th Siege Battery, RGA ====
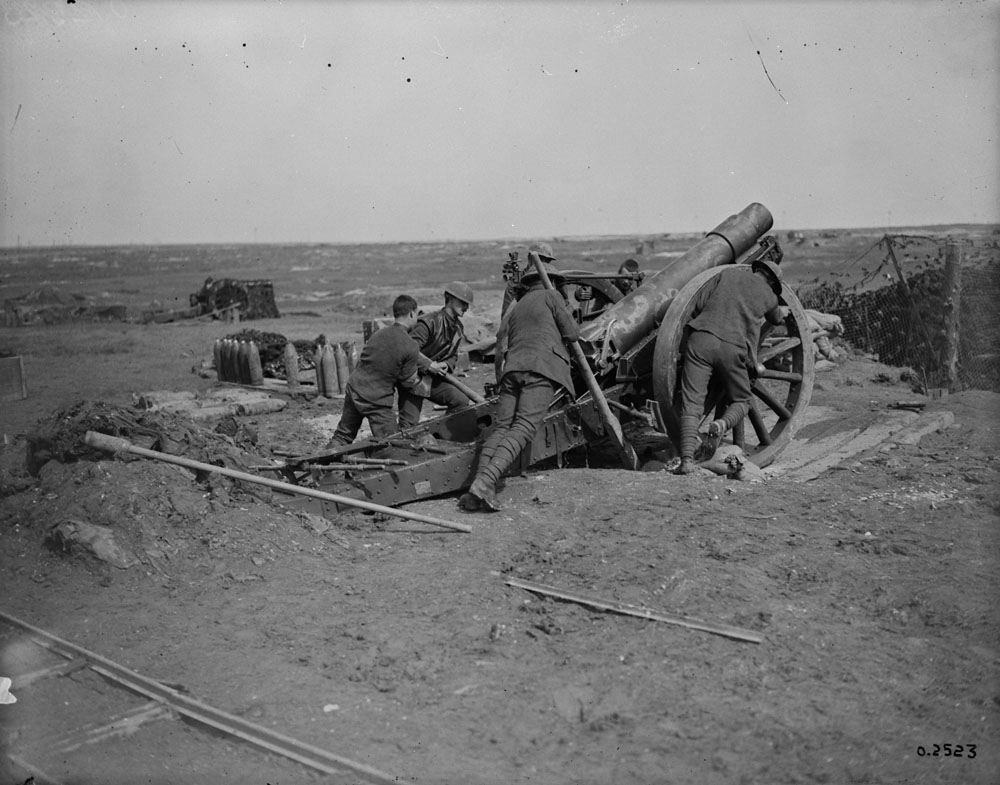
Crew positioning a 6-inch 26 cwt howitzer.

220th Siege Battery, RGA, was formed at Harwich on 31 July 1916 from the Essex & Suffolk RGA under Army Council Instruction 1544 of 8 August 1916. It went out to the Western Front 25 December 1916, equipped with four 6-inch 26 cwt howitzers, and initially joined 72nd HAG with Fifth Army on 7 January 1917 during the winter operations on the Ancre Heights.

72nd HAG followed the German withdrawal to the Hindenburg Line (Operation Alberich), and then joined Third Army for the opening Battle of Arras. 220th Siege Bty served under several different HAGs during the continuing offensive and through the summer. It went to Ypres in the autumn to relieve exhausted units, and served through the grim battles of Passchendaele with 56th HAG. 56th HAG became 56th Brigade in December and 220th Siege Bty remained with it for the rest of the war.

56th Brigade was moved in to reinforce Third Army before the launch of the German Spring Offensive. After the German breakthrough 220th Siege Bty supported the retreating troops, finding ammunition where it could. Eventually the brigade rallied behind Amiens. It returned to the line with Third Army and took part in the Hundred Days advance at the Battles of Albert, Bapaume and Cambrai, followed by the crossing of the Sambre. Even 220th Siege Bty's lighter 6-inch howitzers could not keep up in the final days of the advance. The battery went to Germany as part of the British Army of the Rhine after the Armistice, where it was disbanded in 1919.

==== 245th Siege Battery, RGA ====
245th Siege Battery, RGA, was formed at Harwich on 29 August 1916 with a cadre of 3 officers and 78 ORs from the Essex & Suffolk RGA under Army Council Instruction 1739 of 7 September 1916. It went out to the Western Front on 29 January 1917, equipped with four 6-inch 26 cwt howitzers and joined Second Army in the Ypres sector. Its first major action was at the Battle of Messines, where it suffered numerous casualties under hostile CB fire, including its commander being wounded.

It moved to Ypres in the summer, supporting II Corps in its ill-fated attacks at Pilckem Ridge and Langemarck. It then fired in support of the more successful battles of the Menin Road, Polygon Wood and Broodseinde, and suffered like the other batteries in the mud of Passchendaele. It then went fr rest with 6th HAG, but was sent to help Third Army ward off the fierce German counter-attack following the Battle of Cambrai.

During the winter 6th HAG became 6th Bde, and 245th Siege Bty was brought up to a strength of six howitzers. One of the most serious breakthroughs of the German offensive of 21 March 1918 occurred in front of 245th Siege Bty, and it was forced to pull out hurriedly with the loss of half its guns. It took part in a rearguard action at Mont Saint-Quentin, where 16th (Irish) Division covered the Somme crossings. It got back with one gun, which it handed over to another battery and went to the rear to re-arm and refit. In April 6 Bde was supporting Australian Corps and III Corps when the Germans made a thrust at Villers-Bretonneux) All the guns were brought to bear and the attack was halted, then driven back by counter-attack.

6th Brigade was with Second Army south of Ypres during the summer when 245th Siege Bty was hit by a German bombardment and its commander was killed. The Ypres sector remained quiet during the first part of the Allied offensive of August 1918, but the Germans began withdrawing on Second Army's front and 6th Bde took part in the follow-up, back onto Messines Ridge, leading to the Fifth Battle of Ypres and the Battle of Courtrai. Casualties were still serious, but the battery supported Second Army's crossing of the Schelde. After the Armistice, 45th Siege Bt also served in the Rine Army before it was disbanded in 1919.

==== 356th Siege Battery, RGA ====
356th Siege Battery, RGA, was raised at Harwich on 19 January 1917 from a nucleus provided by details of the Essex & Suffolk RGA. It went out to the Western Front on 12 June, manning four 9.2-inch howitzers. It joined II Corps on 22 June where it exchanged its new Mark II howitzers for the older ones of 148th Siege Bty (see above). The battery was then broken up, one section going to reinforce 76th Siege Bty (see above), the other to 265th Siege Bty.

== Interwar ==
When the TF was reconstituted on 7 February 1920, the former Essex & Suffolk RGA was split into separate units. Nos 1–3 Companies were reorganised as the Essex RGA at Dovercourt with a single battery; this unit later took over some Kent batteries and became the Thames & Medway Coast Brigade.

Meanwhile, No 4 Company reformed at Harwich as the Suffolk RGA. When the TF was reorganised as the Territorial Army (TA) in 1921 this unit was redesignated the Suffolk Coast Brigade, RGA and the single company became 176 Coast Battery. When the Royal Garrison Artillery was subsumed into the Royal Artillery (RA) in 1924, the unit was redesignated again as the Suffolk Heavy Brigade, RA. It took over the Dovercourt drill hall after the Thames & Medway moved to Southend in 1924.

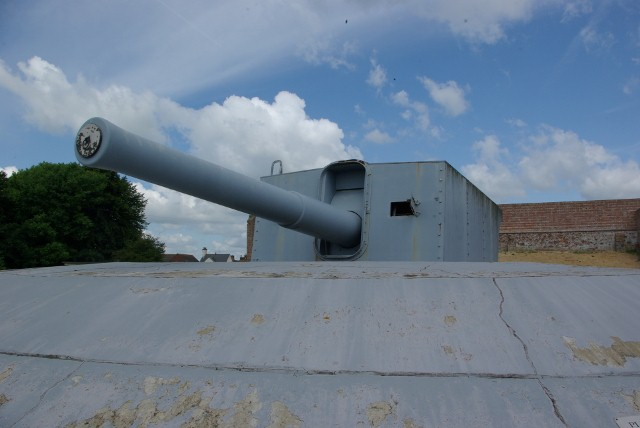
9.2-inch coastal gun preserved at Imperial War Museum Duxford.

In 1926 it was decided that the coast defences of the UK would be manned by the TA alone. These defences reached their final form in 1932, and the brigade raised a new 166 Heavy Bty (Note: The former 166 (City of Rochester) Heavy Bty of the Kent Heavy Bde was converted into an independent anti-aircraft battery at the same time.) at Ipswich on 1 October that year. Together with the Suffolk Fortress Royal Engineers, TA, it became fully responsible for the Harwich defences. In 1938 the RA adopted the more conventional designation of 'regiment' instead of 'brigade' for a lieutenant-colonel's command, and the unit became the 'Suffolk Heavy Regiment on 1 November On the outbreak of World War II the regiment was responsible for the following armament at Harwich:

- 2 × 9.2-inch
- 4 × 6-inch
- 2 × 4.7-inch

== World War II ==
=== Home defence ===
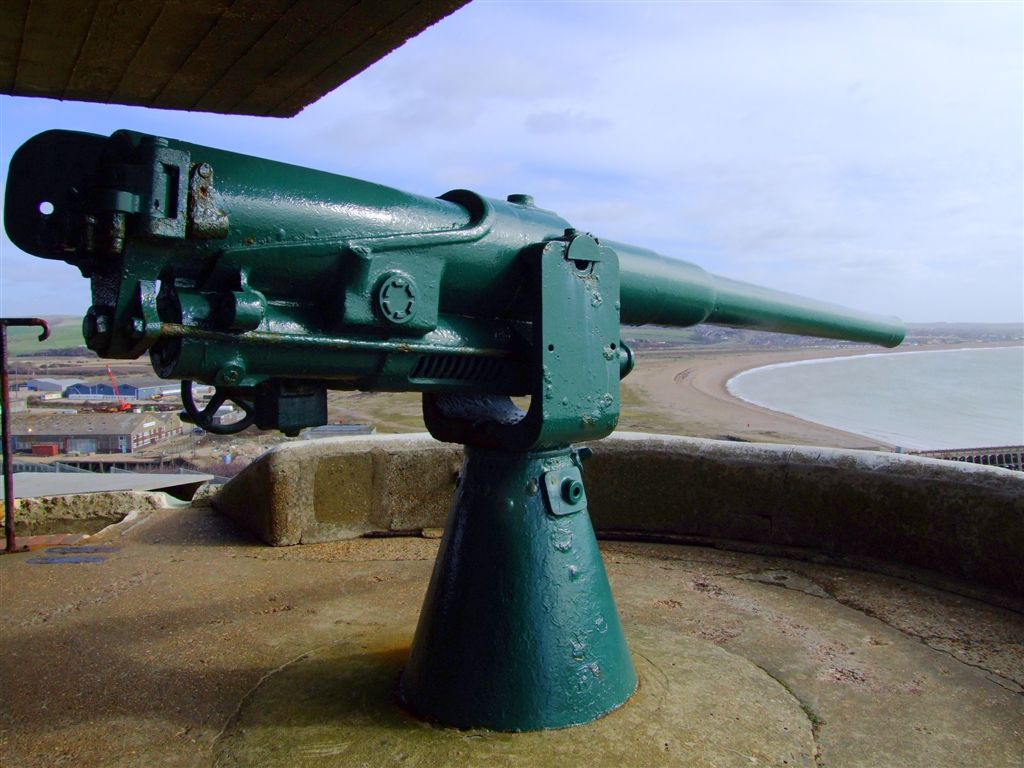
A 12-pounder gun in coast defence mounting, preserved at Newhaven Fort.

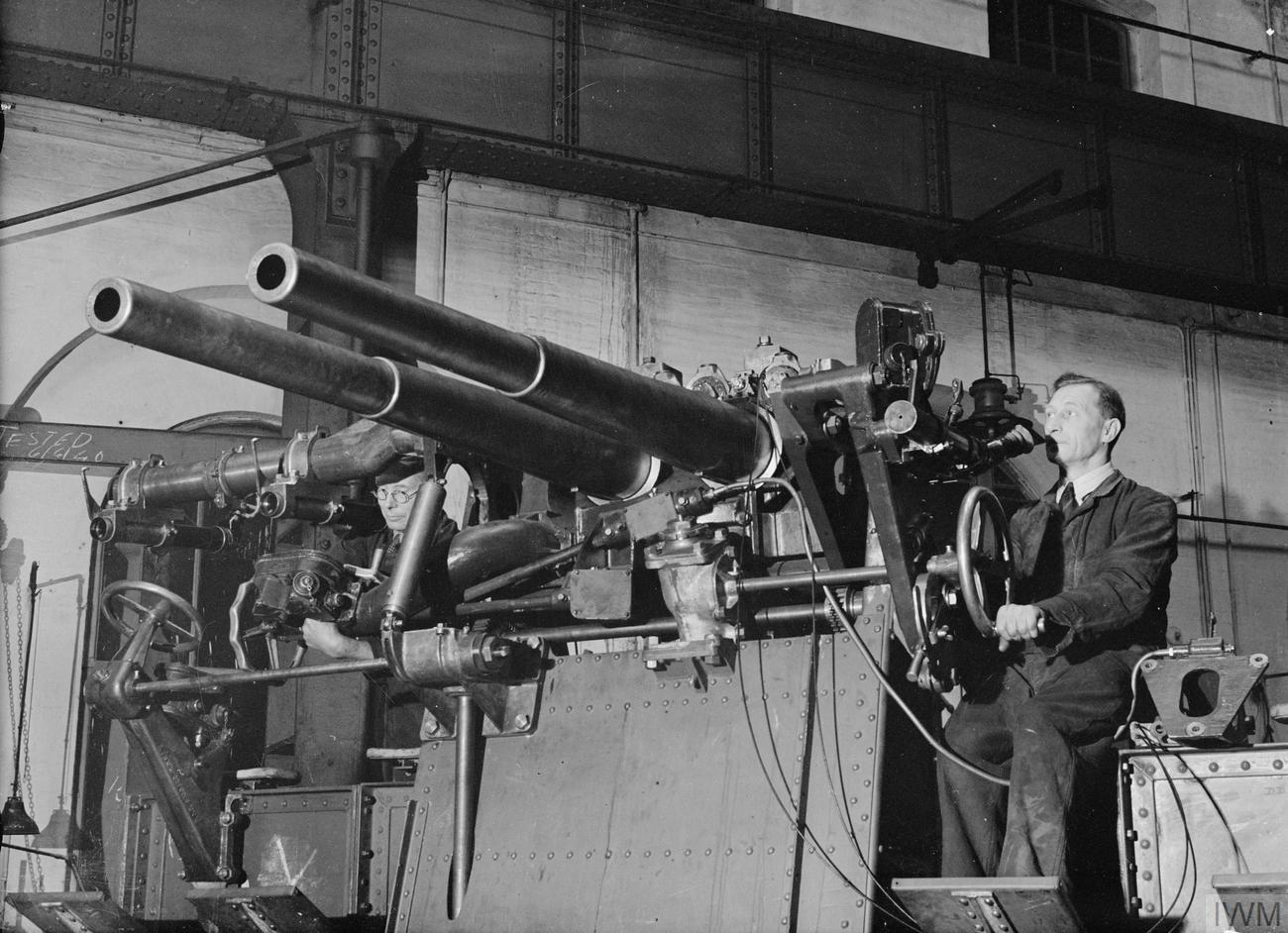
The 6-pounder gun Mark I in twin coastal artillery mount.

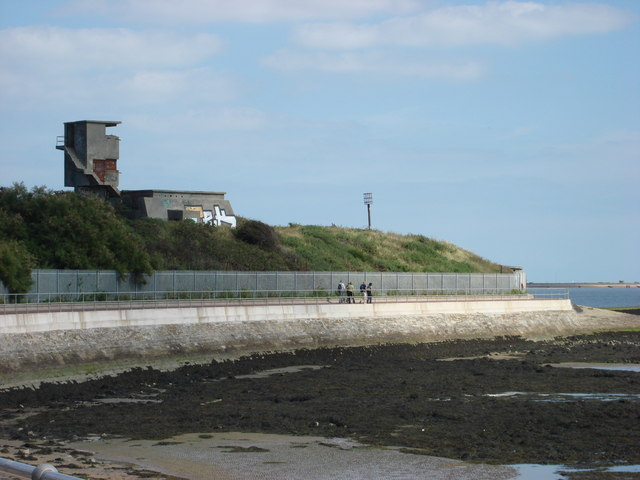
Beacon Hill Battery, Harwich, showing the 1941 director tower for twin 6-pdrs

With the danger of invasion after the British Expeditionary Force was evacuated from Dunkirk, a 'crash' programme began to instal additional guns at smaller ports, together with Emergency Beach Batteries at potential landing sites. The Royal Navy offered the necessary 6-inch guns, some of which were temporarily manned by naval gunners. The first batch, authorised on 22 May 1940, included the following Priority A sites on the East Anglian coast:

- Felixstowe (Manor House) – 2 × 6-inch Mk XII, navy manned
- Aldeburgh – 2 × 6-inch Mk XII, navy manned
- Southwold – 2 × 6-inch Mk XI, navy manned
- Lowestoft (Pakefield) – 2 × 6-inch Mk XI, navy manned
- Great Yarmouth (North Denes) – 2 × 6-inch Mk XI, army manned

A second batch was authorised on 12 June 1940, including:

- Lowestoft (Covehithe) – 2 × 6-inch Mk XI, army manned
- Aldeburgh (Thorpeness) – 2 × 6-inch Mk XI, army manned

Other beach batteries were installed in the area later, including:

- Dunwich – 2 × 4-inch Mk VII
- Minsmere – 2 × 6-inch

In addition, 12-pounder and twin 6-pounder guns were installed to counter motor torpedo boats. At their height in the autumn of 1941, the following guns were installed at the East Anglian ports:

- Harwich Fire Command (Landguard Fort):
  - 2 × 9.2-inch
  - 4 × 6-inch
  - 2 × 12-pdr
  - 3 × 6-pdr
- Lowestoft Fire Command:
- 6 × 6-inch
- 2 × 12-pdr
- Yarmouth Fire Command:
- 4 × 6-inch
- 2 × 12-pdr (Haven Mouth Battery)

During 1941, specially trained Coast Observer Detachments (CODs) began to be organised to man coast artillery radar, and in early 1942 the RA formed Defence Troops to defend exposed coast batteries against hostile raids.

Meanwhile, the RA coast artillery branch had been massively expanded to man the extra defences. With effect from 14 July 1940 the Suffolk Coast Rgt was divided into two separate units, designated 514th and 515th (Suffolk) Coast Regiments:

==== 514th (Suffolk) Coast Regiment ====
Initially formed with A and B Btys, later organised as:

- A Bty – at Links, redesignated 277 Bty 1 April 1941
- B Bty – 12-pdr element left 1 December 1940, joined War Office Reserve from March 1941 and went to Faroe Islands to join 537th Coast Rgt as 187 Bty 29 April 1941; remainder of battery (2 × 6-inch guns at Lowestoft) redesignated 225 Bty 10 February 1941
- 177 Bty – formed and joined 7 August 1941 at Lowestoft Grand
- 191 Bty – twin 6-pdr battery joined from 546th Coast Rgt 1 September 1941 at Hopton
- 215 Bty – 12-pdr battery formed 14 November 1940 by 72nd Coast Training Rgt at Norton Camp, Isle of Wight from a cadre supplied by Scottish Command; joined 28 January 1941 at Lowestoft Pier
- 226 Bty – formed and joined 28 January 1941 at Gorleston Pier Battery
- 325 Bty – formed 10 June 1940, joined 31 December 1940, at North Denes, by 28 January 1941
- 326 Bty – formed 10 June 1940, joined 31 December 1940, at Farefield by 28 January 1941, to Pakefield by 1 May 1942
- 23 Coast Observer Detachment (COD) – joined by 7 January 1942

==== 515th (Suffolk) Coast Regiment ====
Initially formed with A, B, C and D Btys, later organised as:

- A Bty – redesignated 278 Bty 1 April 1941, at Brackenbury Battery
- B Bty – redesignated 279 Bty 1 April 1941, at Landguard Fort
- C Bty – redesignated 280 Bty 1 April 1941, at Darrell's Battery
- D Bty – redesignated 281 Bty 1 April 1941, at Beacon Hill
- E Bty – formed 28 January 1941 – redesignated 282 Bty 1 April 1941, at Cornwallis Battery (twin 6-pdrs), Beacon Hill
- F Bty – formed 28 January 1941 – redesignated 283 Bty 1 April 1941, at Angel, Beacon Hill
- 138 Bty – joined from 533rd (Orkney) Coast Rgt 27 May 1941, at Felixstowe
- 329 Bty – formed 10 June 1940, joined 31 December 1940, at Felixstowe; transferred to 539th Coast Rgt 8 June 1941
- 332 Bty – joined from 517th (Thames & Medway) Coast Rgt 10 February 1942, at Bawdsey
- 4 (Static) Defence Trp – joined from 547th Coast Rgt by 7 April 1942
- 6 (Static) Defence Trp – joined from 548th Coast Rgt by 7 April 1942

=== Mid-war ===
The coast defences of Suffolk were reorganised in early 1942. Firstly, Harwich Fire Command was split into North Bank and South Bank Fire Commands. 515th (Suffolk) Coast Rgt remained in North Bank FC under II Corps, while a new 572nd Coast Rgt was formed at Harwich in South Bank FC under XI Corps, taking over 281, 282 and 283 Btys from 515th. On 1 May 1942 RHQ of 544th Coast Regiment, previously in North East England, was brought in and established at Lowestoft in Lowestoft FC, taking over 177, 215, 225 and 326 Btys and 23 COD from 514th (Suffolk) Coast Rgt which retained Yarmouth FC; both were under XI Corps.

By July 1942 Coastal Artillery Plotting Rooms (later known as Army Plotting Rooms) had been created to coordinate the 'coast watching' radar of the CODs, with No 11 plotting room assigned to Yarmouth FC under II Corps and No 12 to Harwich FC under XI Corps.

==== 514th (Suffolk) Coast Regiment ====
In this period the regiment was composed as follows:

- RHQ – Felixstowe, North Bank FC
- 191, 277, 325 Btys
- 226 Bty – under WO Control by 1 July 1942 and went to 17th Coast Rgt in Middle East Forces
- 384 Bty – joined from 546th Coast Rgt 6 February 1943
- 427 Bty – joined from 531st (Glamorgan) Coast Rgt 30 June 1942, at Gorleston Pier

==== 515th (Suffolk) Coast Regiment ====
In this period the regiment was composed as follows:

- RHQ – Great Yarmouth, Yarmouth FC
- 138, 278, 279, 280, 332 Btys
- 110 Independent Coast Bty – joined from 536th Coast Rgt in the Iceland Garrison, 18 August 1942; transferred to 572nd Coast Rgt 12 October 1942
- 23 COD – returned from 544th Coast Rgt by November 1943
- 56 COD – joined from 546th Coast Rgt by 14 July 1942
- 82 COD – joined from 547th Coast Rgt by 18 November 1943

==== 572nd Coast Regiment ====
In this period the regiment was composed as follows:

- RHQ – Harwich, South Bank FC
- 281, 282 Btys
- 283 Bty – transferred to 541st Coast Rgt in Shetland 12 October 1942
- 110 Bty – joined from 515th (Suffolk) Coast Rgt 12 October 1942, at Angel
- 144 Bty – joined from 534th (Orkney) Coast Rgt by 13 April 1943; returned to Orkneys by July 1943

=== Late War ===
By 1943 the threat from German attack had diminished and there was demand for trained gunners for the fighting fronts. A process of reducing the manpower in the coast defences began, but there were few organisational changes for the Suffolk defences closest to the enemy. In June 1943, 514th Coast Rgt and No 11 Plotting Room transferred from II Corps to Norfolk and Cambridge District Coast Artillery, while 515th, 572nd and No 2 Plotting Room left XI Corps and came under II Corps District. By March 1944 both district HQs had been disbanded and all the units came directly under HQ Coast Artillery, Eastern Command.

The manpower requirements for the forthcoming Allied invasion of Normandy (Operation Overlord) led to further reductions in coast defences in April 1944. By this stage of the war many of the coast battery positions were manned by Home Guard detachments (such as Aldeburgh, Bawdsey and Southwold) or in the hands of care and maintenance parties, including the Beacon Hill, Brackenbury and North Denes batteries. Consequently, RHQ of 572nd Coast Rgt was disbanded on 1 April 1944, together with 110 Bty; as an established TA unit, 281 Bty passed into suspended animation; 282 Bty returned to 515th (Suffolk) Coast Rgt. The same disbandment included 546th Coast Rgt in Norfolk, its batteries (174, 197, 219, 228, 324, 353) being taken over by 514th (Suffolk) Coast Rgt, and 548th Coast Rgt in Essex, the batteries (330, 331, 372, 373) going to 515th (Suffolk) Coast Rgt. 23, 56 and 82 CODs were also disbanded at this time.

After VE Day Britain's coast defences could be stood down. RHQ of 514th (Suffolk) Coast Rgt began entering suspended animation on 1 June 1945 together with 277 Bty; 191, 325 and 384 Btys began disbanding on the same day, while 427 Bty transferred to 515th (Suffolk) Coast Rgt. At the same time 544th Coast Rgt at Lowestoft was disbanded and its remaining batteries transferred to 515th. These procedures were completed by 26 June, and left 515th (Suffolk) Coast Rgt as the sole regimental HQ commanding coast artillery in Eastern Command from The Wash to the Thames, with the following organisation:

- RHQ at Felixstowe
- 215 Bty – joined from disbanded 544th Coast Rgt 1 June 1945
- 138, 278, 279 Btys – entered suspended animation by 22 June 1945
- 280, 282 Btys
- 332 Bty – disbanded by 22 June 1945
- 427 Bty – joined from 514th (Suffolk) Coast Rgt 1 June 1945

515th (Suffolk) Coast Rgt continued as a holding regiment for the remaining TA coast batteries in the Eastern Ports (215, 280, 282, 427) until 10 January 1946 when RHQ and the batteries commenced entering suspended animation, which was completed by 31 January.

== Postwar ==
When the TA was reconstituted on 1 January 1947, 514th and 515th (Suffolk) Coast Rgts were reformed as 418 (Norfolk) Coast Regiment at Great Yarmouth and 419 (Suffolk) Coast Regiment at Harwich respectively. Both were in 101 Coast Brigade, based at Dover.

However, it was soon afterwards decided to reduce the number of TA coast regiments, and so on 1 September 1948 the unit at Great Yarmouth was converted into 418 (Norfolk) (Mixed) Heavy Anti-Aircraft Regiment ('Mixed' indicating that members of the Women's Royal Army Corps were integrated into the regiment). On 1 August 1950 the regiment was amalgamated into 284 (1st East Anglian) HAA Rgt, which became a Mixed unit. Anti-Aircraft Command was disbanded on 10 March 1955 and there were wholesale mergers among its units: 284 HAA Rgt amalgamated with 389 (King's Own Royal Regiment, Norfolk Yeomanry) Light AA Rgt to form 284 (KORR, Norfolk Yeomanry) LAA Rgt.

419 (Suffolk) Rgt continued in the coast defence role until the Coast Artillery Branch of the RA was abolished in 1956. The regiment was absorbed into 358 (Suffolk Yeomanry) Medium Rgt on 31 October 1956, forming a new battery within that regiment. A further round of TA reductions took place in 1961, and on 1 May 284 and 358 Rgts merged to form 308 (Suffolk & Norfolk) Yeomanry Field Rgt and links with the Suffolk coast artillery were effectively ended.

== Honorary Colonels ==
The following served as Honorary Colonel of the unit:

- E. G. Pretyman, former captain, RA, Member of Parliament for Woodbridge, Suffolk, appointed 3 May 1899
- Field Marshal Viscount Byng of Vimy, appointed 7 November 1923
- Lt-Col Lord Woodbridge, former commanding officer, appointed 19 September 1936
- Lord Ailwyn, former captain, RN, appointed (to 419 (Suffolk) Coast Rgt) 1947
