= Thames and Medway Coast Artillery =

Thames & Medway Heavy Brigade, RA 516th (Thames & Medway) Coast Rgt, RA 517th (Thames & Medway) Coast Rgt, RA 518th (Thames & Medway) Coast Rgt, RA 415th (Thames & Medway) Coast Rgt, RA
- Cap badge of the Royal Artillery (pre-1953)
- Active: 1932–1956
- Country: United Kingdom
- Branch: Territorial Army
- Role: Coast Artillery
- Size: 1–3 Regiments
- Part of: Thames and Medway Defences
- Garrison/HQ: Rochester, Kent; Gravesend, Kent
- Engagements: World War II

The Thames and Medway Coast Artillery, which at its peak comprised three full regiments, was formed in Britain's Territorial Army in 1932 to man coastal defence guns on both banks of the Thames Estuary. It served in this role during World War II, at the end of which it sent troops to work in the rear areas in Europe. It was reformed postwar but was broken up when the coast artillery branch was abolished in 1956.

== Origin ==
When Britain's Territorial Force (TF) was reconstituted on 7 February 1920 after World War I, the former Essex and Suffolk Royal Garrison Artillery, which had defended the ports around Harwich, was split into separate sections. The Essex Royal Garrison Artillery was redesignated the Essex Coast Brigade, Royal Garrison Artillery the following year when the TF was reorganised as the Territorial Army (TA). It consisted of a headquarters at Dovercourt and a single battery numbered 175. When the Royal Garrison Artillery was subsumed into the Royal Artillery (RA) in 1924, the unit was redesignated again as the Essex Heavy Brigade, RA.

== Thames & Medway Heavy Brigade ==
In 1926 it was decided that the coastal defence guns of Great Britain should be solely manned by part-time soldiers of the TA. This involved some reorganisation of existing units and the creation of some new units. By 1932 the reorganisation had taken its final form: the defences of the ports of Eastern England would be responsibility of three RA heavy brigades. The Suffolk Hvy Bde would man the Harwich batteries, the Kent and Sussex Hvy Bdes would combine as the Kent and Sussex to man the batteries from Dover to Newhaven, and a newly-formed Thames and Medway Heavy Brigade would be responsible for the Thames Estuary including the Medway defences. The new unit was formed on 1 October 1932, comprising two batteries transferred from the Kent Hvy Bde and absorbing the single-battery Essex Hvy Bde, giving the following organisation:

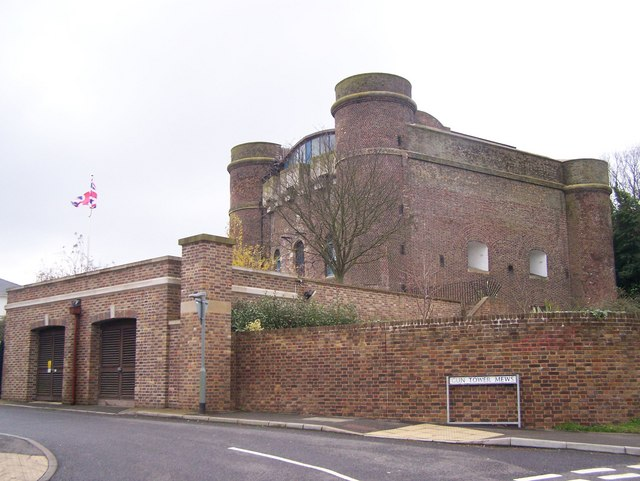
Fort Clarence, Rochester, HQ of the Thames & Medway Heavy Brigade.

- Headquarters (HQ) at Fort Clarence, Rochester
- 167 (Kent) Heavy Battery at Pelham Road, Gravesend
- 169 (Kent) Heavy Battery at the Royal Artillery Barracks, Sheerness
- 175 (Essex) Heavy Battery at Dovercourt, moving to the Drill Hall, York Road, Southend-on-Sea

In line with the RA's modernisation of its titles, the brigade was termed a regiment from 1 November 1938. As the TA was increased in size after the Munich Crisis, the Thames & Medway (T&M) Hvy Rgt formed a new 192 Hvy Bty at Southend by August 1939.

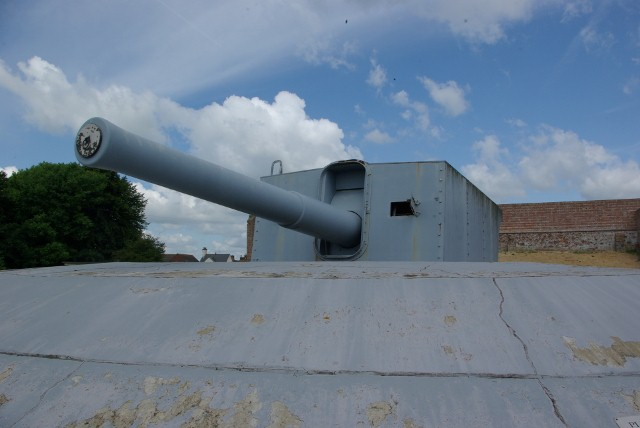
9.2-inch Coastal gun preserved at Imperial War Museum Duxford.

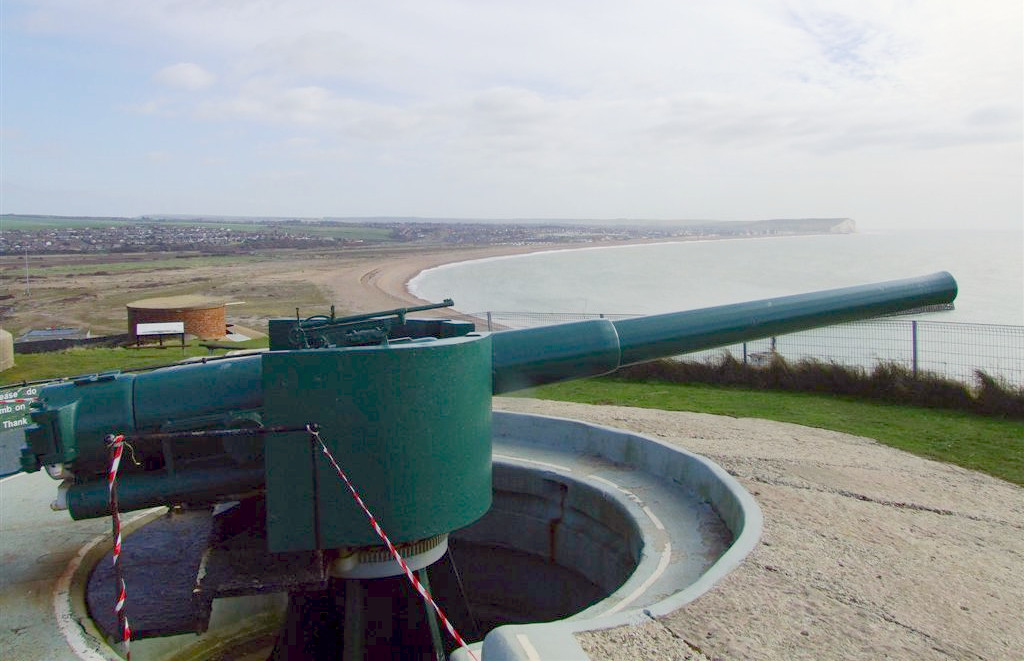
Mk VII 6-inch gun in typical coast defence emplacement, preserved at Newhaven Fort.

== World War II ==
=== Mobilisation ===
On the outbreak of war on 3 September 1939 the regiment was responsible for the following guns:

- 5 × 9.2-inch
- 6 × 6-inch
- 2 × 4.7-inch
- 4 × 12-pounders

These were controlled by:

- Thames Fire Command at Shoeburyness
- Medway Fire Command at Sheerness

under the command of RA Fixed Defences, Eastern Ports, with its HQ at Sheerness

=== Home Defence ===
With the danger of invasion after the British Expeditionary Force was evacuated from Dunkirk, the coastal artillery regiments underwent a major reorganisation in the summer of 1940. On 14 July the three T&M heavy batteries were expanded into three complete coast regiments:

==== 516th (Thames & Medway) Coast Regiment ====
Formed with A, B, C and D Btys, later organised as:

- 357 Bty – joined 31 December 1940, at Shornemead Fort; transferred to 518th (T&M) Coast Rgt by 1 April 1940
- 284 Bty – formed from part of A Bty 1 April 1941, at Grain Fort
- 285 Bty – formed from part of A Bty 1 April 1941, at Martello battery
- 286 Bty – formed from B Bty 1 April 1941, at Whitehall Farm, moved to Canvey Island by 16 March 1943
- 287 Bty – formed from C Bty 1 April 1941, at Garrison Point, moved to Grain Fort by 16 April 1943
- 288 Bty – formed from D Bty 1 April 1941, as Garrison anti-Motor Torpedo Boat battery
- 220 Bty – formed 16 January 1941 by 72 Coast Training Rgt at Norton Camp, joined 30 April 1941 at Sheerness

==== 517th (Thames & Medway) Coast Regiment ====
Formed with A and B Btys, later organised as:

- B Bty – disbanded 31 December 1940
- 332 Bty – joined 31 December 1940, at Foulness, moved to Bawdsey 10 February 1942
- 356 Bty – joined 31 December 1940, at Coalhouse Fort
- 419 Bty – formed 21 September 1940, joined 31 December 1940, at Shoeburyness
- 167 Bty – formed from part of A Bty 1 April 1941, 6-inch battery at Canvey Island, moved to Garrison Point 16 March 1943
- 168 Bty – formed from part of A Bty 1 April 1941, 3-pounder battery at Canvey Island, moved to Scars Elbow and St Mary's Bay by November 1941

==== 518th (Thames & Medway) Coast Regiment ====
Formed with A and B Btys, later organised as:

- 334 Bty – joined 31 December 1940, at Shellness, moved to No 1 Bastion 7 December 1942
- 289 Bty – formed from A Bty 1 April 1941
- 290 Bty – formed from B Bty 1 April 1941; transferred to 540th Coast Rgt 16 April 1941
- 357 Bty – joined from 516th (T&M) Rgt 15 September 1941; transferred to 524th (Lancashire & Cheshire) Coast Rgt 23 October 1941
- 109 Bty – joined from 524th (L&C) Rgt 23 October 1941, at Shornemead Fort

During the summer of 1940 a number of emergency batteries of ex-Royal Navy guns were installed, including:

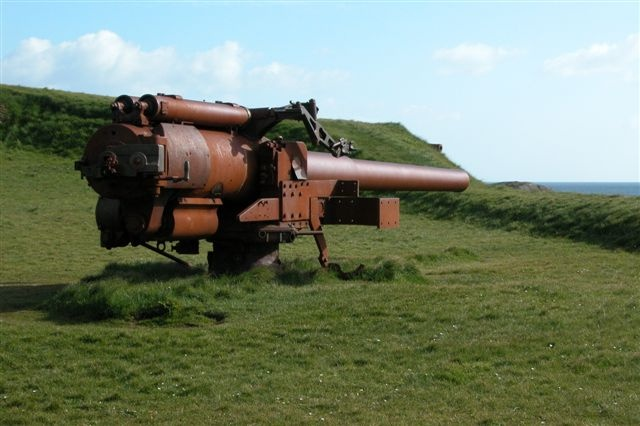
5.5-inch gun in wartime emergency position, preserved on the Faroe Islands.

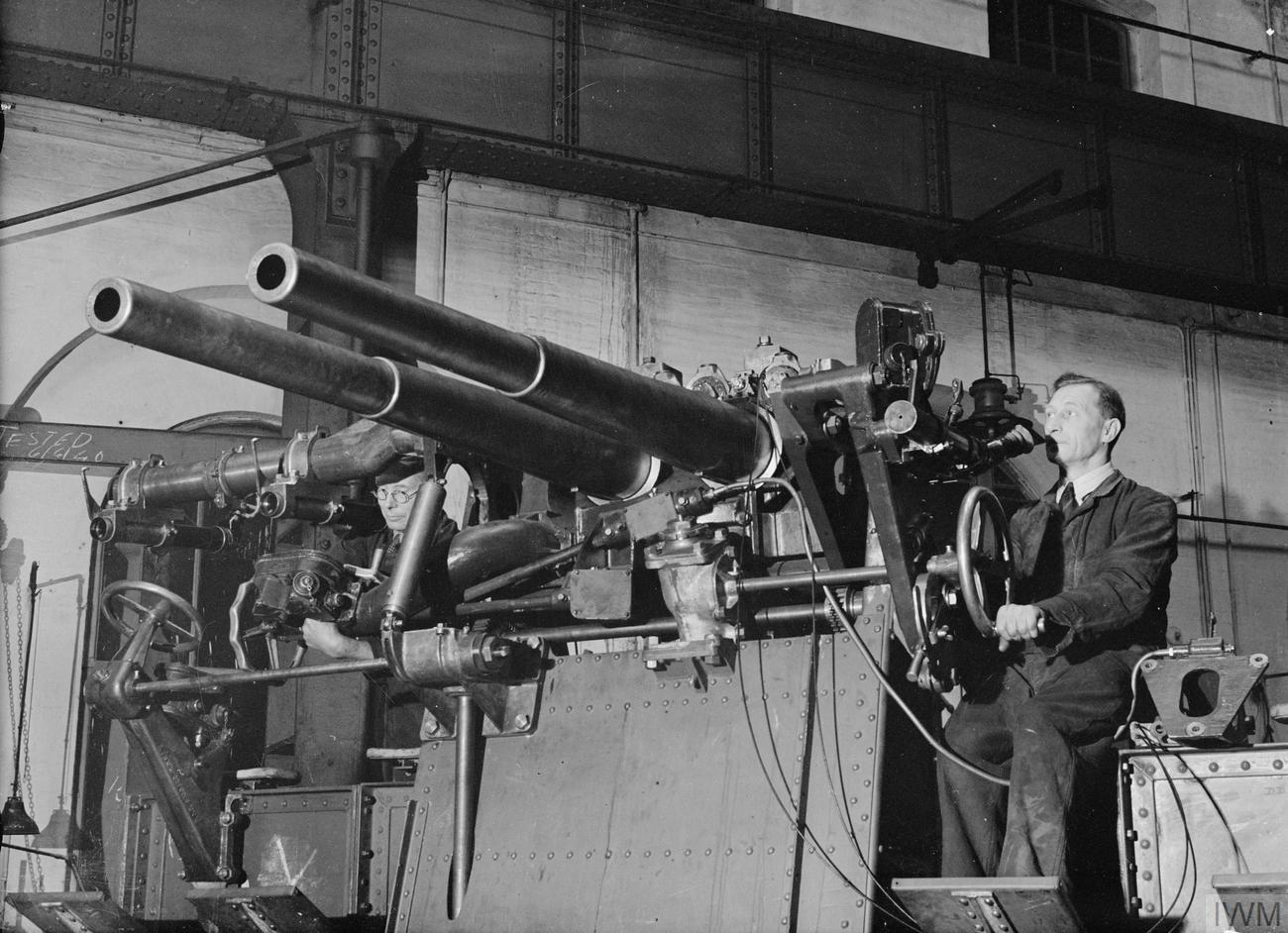
6-pounder Mark I guns in twin coastal artillery mount.

- Shoeburyness – 2 × 6-inch
- Coalhouse Fort – 2 × 5.5-inch
- Shornemead Fort – 2 × 5.5-inch
- Shellness – 2 × 6-inch

By November 1940 the Thames & Medway guns comprised:

- 5 × 9.2-inch
- 10 × 6-inch
- 4 × 5.5-inch
- 3 × 6-pounders
- 2 × 3-pounders

=== Mid-War ===
By September 1941, when Britain's coast defences were at their height, the Thames & Medway fixed guns were:

- 2 × 9.2-inch
- 12 × 6-inch
- 4 × 5.5-inch
- 5 × 6-pounder

After the rapid expansion in the early part of the war, there was some rationalisation among coast artillery units, with 518th (T&M) Coast Rgt being disbanded on 1 October 1941 and its batteries distributed amongst the other two regiments, which then had the following organisation under the command of HQ Thames and Medway Defences:

516th (Thames & Medway) Coast Regiment

- Regimental HQ (RHQ) at Sheerness in Sheerness FC
- 220, 287, 288 Btys
- 284 Bty – disbanded 1 December 1941 and personnel distributed to the other batteries
- 285 Bty – disbanded 15 March 1943
- 286 Bty – transferred to 517th (T&M) Rgt 16 March 1943
- 289 Bty – joined from 518th (T&M) Rgt 15 September 1941; transferred to 520th (Kent & Sussex) Coast Rgt 16 April 1943
- 334 Bty – joined from 518th (T&M) Rgt 15 September 1941
- 167 Bty – joined from 517th (T&M) Rgt 16 March 1943
- 295 Bty – joined from 520th (K&S) Rgt 16 April 1943
- No 3 Coast Observer Detachment (COD) – joined from 568th (Devon) Coast Rgt by July 1943; temporarily transferred to 521st (K&S) Coast Rgt November 1943–March 1944

517th (Thames & Medway) Coast Regiment

- RHQ at Canvey in Thames FC
- 168, 356, 419 Btys
- 109 Bty – transferred to War Office (WO) control 12 February 1942 and attached to Coast Artillery Training Centre
- 332 Bty – transferred to 515th (Suffolk) Coast Rgt 10 February 1942
- 425 Independent Coast Bty – joined 12 February 1942, at Shornemead
- 167 Bty – transferred to 516th (T&M) Rgt 16 March 1943
- 286 Bty – joined from 516th (T&M) Rgt 16 March 1943

By July 1942 Coastal Artillery Plotting Rooms had been created to coordinate the 'coast watching' radar of the CODs, with No 13 plotting room assigned to Sheerness.

By the end of 1942 the threat from German attack had diminished and there was demand for trained gunners for the fighting fronts. A process of reducing the manpower in the coast defences began in 1943, but there were few organisational changes for the Thames & Medway defences closest to the enemy.

The manpower requirements for the forthcoming Allied invasion of Normandy (Operation Overlord) led to further reductions in coast defences in April 1944. By this stage of the war many of the coast battery positions were manned by Home Guard detachments or in the hands of care and maintenance parties. On 1 April 168 and 286 Btys were transferred from 517th to 516th Coast Rgt, and 220 Bty was transferred in the opposite direction, while No 3 COD was disbanded.

=== Late war ===
By the end of 1944 serious naval attacks on the coast could be discounted and the WO began reorganising surplus coastal units into garrison infantry battalions. On 3 December RHQ of 516th Coast Rgt was converted into 516th (Thames & Medway) Garrison Rgt, RA, and its batteries (167, 168, 286, 287, 288, 334, 356, 425) became independent and then transferred to 517th (T&M) Coast Rgt. By January 1945 21st Army Group operating in North West Europe was suffering a manpower crisis, so the WO went further and converted the RA garrison regiments (and some other RA units) into infantry battalions for duties in the rear areas. 516th (T&M) Garrison Rgt was converted into 614th (Thames & Medway) Infantry Rgt, RA, comprising five batteries designated A–E. It served in Europe until after the end of the war, passing into suspended animation between 5 and 25 July 1946. On 1 June 1945, shortly after VE Day, RHQ of 517th Coast Rgt had gone into suspended animation together with its TA batteries, while the war-formed batteries were disbanded.

== Postwar ==
When the TA was reconstituted on 1 January 1947, 614 (T&M) Rgt was reformed as 415 (Thames & Medway) Coast Rgt with RHQ at Gravesend and R (Essex) Bty at Artillery House, Stratford Green. It formed part of 101 Coast Bde at Dover.

The Coast Artillery Branch of the RA was disbanded during 1956, and on 31 October the regiment was broken up. Its Kent batteries amalgamated with 263 (6th London) Medium Rgt to form 263 (6th London) Light Rgt, while the Essex batteries amalgamated with 353 (London) Medium Rgt. In 1961 the Essex (Canvey Island and Southend) batteries of 353 Med Rgt were absorbed into 304 (Essex Yeomanry Royal Horse Artillery) Field Rgt, while the Kent (Sheerness and Gravesend) batteries of 263 Med Rgt were amalgamated with a battery of 458 (Kent) Light Anti-Aircraft Rgt and 211 Field Squadron, Royal Engineers to become 211 (Thames & Medway) Field Sqn in 44th (Home Counties) Divisional/District Engineers.

== Honorary Colonels ==
The following served as Honorary Colonel of the unit:

- Lt-Col F.W. Leaver, TD, appointed 18 June 1930
- Col Fiennes, 1st Lord Cornwallis, CBE, TD, appointed 11 March 1933, died 26 September 1935
- Capt Wykeham, 2nd Lord Cornwallis, MC, appointed 25 September 1937, continued with 415 (T&M) Coast Rgt

== Insignia ==
415 Coast Rgt is believed to have worn an unofficial supplementary shoulder title with 'THAMES & MEDWAY' embroidered in the RA colours of red on navy blue.
