= Haven Street =

Haven Street may refer to:

- Haven Street, Hong Kong, a road in Causeway Bay, Hong Kong Island, Hong Kong
- Haven Street, a street in Baltimore, Maryland, United States

== See also ==
- Havenstreet
