= The Cutting Room (film) =

- Film poster
- Directed by: Warren Dudley
- Written by: Warren Dudley
- Produced by: T. J. Herbert
- Starring: Parry Glasspool; Lucy-Jane Quinlan; Lydia Orange
- Cinematography: Ed White
- Production company: Itchy Fish Film
- Distributed by: Three Wolves Ltd
- Release date: June 2015
- Running time: 90 minutes
- Country: United Kingdom
- Language: English
- Budget: £12,000

The Cutting Room is a 2015 British found footage horror film written and directed by Warren Dudley. The film was released in June 2015 and the bulk of principal photography was shot in Newhaven Fort's underground labyrinth of dark and winding brick tunnels.

== Plot ==
College students Raz, Charlie and Jess are about to start work on their end of year Media Studies project unaware of a malevolent force lurking deep below their sleepy town. A recent wave of apparent Cyberbullying and the disappearance of two local girls lead the group to an abandoned army barracks situated deep in the forests that surround the college. What they find there is a terrifying labyrinth of tunnels from which there seems no escape and a dark figure hell bent on tormenting them. Hunted, frightened and lost, Raz, Charlie and Jess must now escape the barracks or suffer the unspeakable fate that awaits them.

== Cast ==
- Parry Glasspool as Raz Scott
- Lucy-Jane Quinlan as Charlie Miller
- Lydia Orange as Jess Dann
- T. J. Herbert as Mark Kallis
- Jason Rhodes as Seth Bridger
- Mkaya Carrigan as Rosy Clarke
- Roger O'Hara as Mr Clarke
- Emily Jayne as Christa Clarke
- Andromeda Godfrey as Mrs Miller
- Sam Chittenden as Mrs Jenkins
- Louisa Adams as Clara Jenkins
- Neil James as Policeman
- Karen Boniface as Helena Barrow

== Soundtrack ==
The original score is by Richey Rynkowski. Additional music came from artists including Maid of Ace, Mojo Jojo, and Fins a Luminous.

== Reception ==
Paul Mount of Starburst rated it 7/10 stars and called it a "a brisk, no-nonsense effort" that puts an English spin on found footage. Mount concludes that the film is "a cut above the rest", partially thanks to its twist ending. Matt Boiselle of Dread Central rated it 2/5 stars and wrote that it is simplistic and boring, though he said it has several creepy scenes in the middle. Nicholas Olsen of HorrorNews.Net called it "an effective horror film" that makes the most of its locations.
