= Timothy Didymus =

British sound artist

- Years active: 1980–
- Notable work: Dark Symphony, Kosmische Glass
- Style: Electronic music, Generative art, Sound art
- Website: timothydidymus.com

Timothy Didymus (born 1966, Portsmouth) is a British artist and musician based in Brighton. He is considered a pioneer in the field of generative music. Didymus has collaborated with artists such as Brian Eno, Cornelia Sollfrank, Emilia Telese and presented at institutions and festivals such as ZKM, Ars Electronica, International Symposium on Electronic Art (ISEA), Werkleitz Biennale of Multimedia Arts, Liverpool Biennial, De La Warr Pavilion, Fort Process.

Didymus began writing and performing music in 1980, primarily as a drummer. In 1993 he began creating generative electronic music using SSEYO's Koan software, producing algorithmic breakbeat and drum and bass, and ambient music. Didymus contributed to the development of the Koan Plus and Koan Pro software during the 1990s, initially as a beta tester and later credited as Koan's 'Principle Musician'. Koan won the ‘Technical Innovation’ category at the BAFTA Interactive Entertainment Awards in 2001.

Didymus uses generative composition in the contexts of live concerts, radiophonic works, sound installations, and generative multimedia releases, including Float in 1997. In 2003, Didymus curated Dark Symphony in Linz, a 96-hour generative sound installation commissioned by Ars Electronica. The installation featured a 250,000 watt sound system positioned on the banks of the Danube, which played generative music by Didymus, Brian Eno, Tim Cole, Mark Harrop and others.

In the 2010s, Didymus developed Kosmische Glass, an instrument and musical automaton that produces acoustic tones from glass by means of friction. The instrument is an automated, electronic development of the glass armonica invented by Benjamin Franklin in 1761. An LP, also entitled Kosmische Glass, was released by Beatabet in 2017.
