= Emilia Telese =

Italian artist (born 1973)

Emilia Telese (born in Sarno, Italy, 1973) is an Italian artist whose practice includes performance, visual, site-specific and video art, interactive and body-responsive technology, installation, literature and public art. She lives and works between Brighton, UK, Foggia, Italy, and Reykjavik, Iceland. Telese graduated in 1996 with a BA (Honours) in painting from the Fine Arts Academy, Florence, focusing on 14th-century techniques, Arte Povera and political performance. In 1997 she studied acid-based printmaking techniques at the University of Brighton, where she continues to lecture. In addition she lectures at other institutions in the UK and internationally, specialising in the relationship between art, economics and professional practice. Her work Life Begins at Land's End (2013) was part of Rebirth Day, a concept organised by Michelangelo Pistoletto. Pistoletto named her a Third Paradise Ambassador, which is a small group of people chosen by him to embody the spirit of his Third Paradise concept. Her videos, along with works by other artists, were shown at the Musee du Louvre in Paris. In 2015 her exhibition Modern Women was featured at Airspace Gallery in Stoke-on-Trent, with artist Binita Walia.

== Career overview ==
Early performances and sound art works were featured in Ars Electronica, Linz (1999, 2003), ZKM (2002) in collaboration with British generative musician Timothy Didymus, and at Manege Institute of Contemporary Art, Saint Petersburg, Russia with electronic art duo Liquidstatic/Testcard. Later works include Life of a Star, which was created for Fabrica in Brighton in 1998, shown on Channel 5's The Big Art Challenge (2004) and finally presented during the 2005 Venice Biennale. As Telese walked through the streets of Venice pretending to be a celebrity, accompanied by bodyguards, crowds began to gather and passers-by asked for her autograph despite not knowing who she was. Life of a Star was subsequently shown in solo shows in Denmark and the UK. Perfect Ten (2006) at Leeds City Art Gallery was a performance and installation in which she surrounded herself and Antonio Canova's sculpture Hope of Venus with hundreds of beauty products and magazines. Perfect 10 was also shown at the Royal Festival Hall, London (2011); the same work toured to Buenos Aires, Argentina for the Endangered Bodies Summit. In February 2011 Telese spoke about women and the media at the Endangered Species world summit in London spearheaded by Susie Orbach, and subsequently in New York City and Rio de Janeiro.

In 2007 Telese produced and presented Radio Sophia, a bilingual Italian and English language programme for Brighton's community radio station, Radio Reverb FM. She was a founding member of the Live Art Forum South East for live art, performance, and cross-discipline art forms. Telese works as a freelance art writer and specialist in artists' professional practice.

Her work has been shown at galleries, festivals and museums including the New Forest Pavilion at the 51st Venice Biennale (Venice, Italy), Ars Electronica (Linz, Austria), ZKM (Karlsruhe, Germany), Chashama (New York City, USA), Centro Cultural Telemar (Rio de Janeiro, Brazil), Manege (St. Petersburg, Russia), Leeds City Gallery, ArtSway (New Forest, UK), the Freud Museum (London, UK), Tate Britain and Íslensk Grafík (Reykjavík, Iceland).

== Participatory and engagement based commissions and projects ==
Telese's workshop and participatory projects have included work with adults and children with profound mental and physical disabilities (Making Art Work, Hastings, and Interaction MK, Milton Keynes in 2011), participatory sensorial Olympic walks for the Cultural Olympiad (Four Senses, 2010 ), and Dreamland, a conceptual installation performance with Isidro Lopez-Aparicio and inhabitants of the Tifariti refugee camp for Art Tifariti 2009. The latter was an international event for the liberation of the Saharawi tribes of Western Sahara, later presented at The 28th State – European Borders in an Age of Anxiety symposium, Tate Britain, London. In 2007 she created The Rice Project, a public art installation with community participation and made in collaboration with Edoardo Malagigi, Guyan Porter and Chris Biddlecombe.

== Awards ==
Telese has received grant awards from Arts Council England, Millennium Festival Awards, and the British Council. In 2015 she also received an Arts and Humanities Research Council (AHRC) PhD scholarship from Warwick University and A-N The Artists' Information Company to write about the relationship between artists and the economy in the UK.

== Reviews and publications ==
Her work has been covered by broadcasters including BBC2, Five, RAI, and Current TV, and in publications such as The Sunday Telegraph, The Guardian, The Times, El Pais, The St Petersburg Times, La Nazione, a-n magazine, Art Monthly and Art Review.

A chapter was dedicated to Telese's work in The Scar of Visibility: Medical Performances and Contemporary Art (Minnesota University Press 2007 ISBN 0-8166-4653-8) by Petra Kuppers.

In 2023, the Icelandic national broadcaster RÚV and the magazine The Reykjavík Grapevine featured Telese exhibition Ferna, a series of etchings on multi-layer beverage cartons.

== Boards and advisory groups ==
Telese was a Regional Council Member for Arts Council England South East between 2009 and 2014. From 2008 to 2011 she was an advisory group member at The European Forum for Fine Art, a Europe-wide forum connected to ELIA, the European League of Institutes of the Arts, with a focus on researching the teaching of professional development for artists. She was a national advisory member at Creative Cultural Skills, a Department for Culture, Media and Sport body supporting training for professional development of artists and creative people in the UK, between 2009 and 2011.

== Academic papers ==
Telese received her PhD in Cultural Policy at Loughborough University in 2021. The subjects of Telese's academic papers include artists' spaces and environments, and the interaction between artists and other sectors of the economy:

- Telese, E - The making of the artist, from 'genius' to 'professional': social value and individualisation in UK visual artists, 1980–2010 - School of Social Sciences and Humanities, 2021, Loughborough University.
- Telese, E - The Gift Controversy. Presented at "Creative industries and Regional policies: Making Space and Giving Space", The Regional Studies Association Research Network on Creative Industries and the Regions, University of Birmingham September 2009.
- Telese, E - The profession of the artist in the real world: how does academic study and research relate to the art ecosystem? Dynamics and dialogue beyond academia, towards professional practice in Europe, 2009.
- Telese, E - Shaping artists' spaces -The Networking Artists' Networks initiative and the reshaping and enabling of cultural space "Sensi/able Spaces - Space, Art and the Environment" - SPARTEN conference, Reykjavík, June 2006, Cambridge Scholars Publishing, 2007.
