= Haven Street, Hong Kong =

Street in Hong Kong

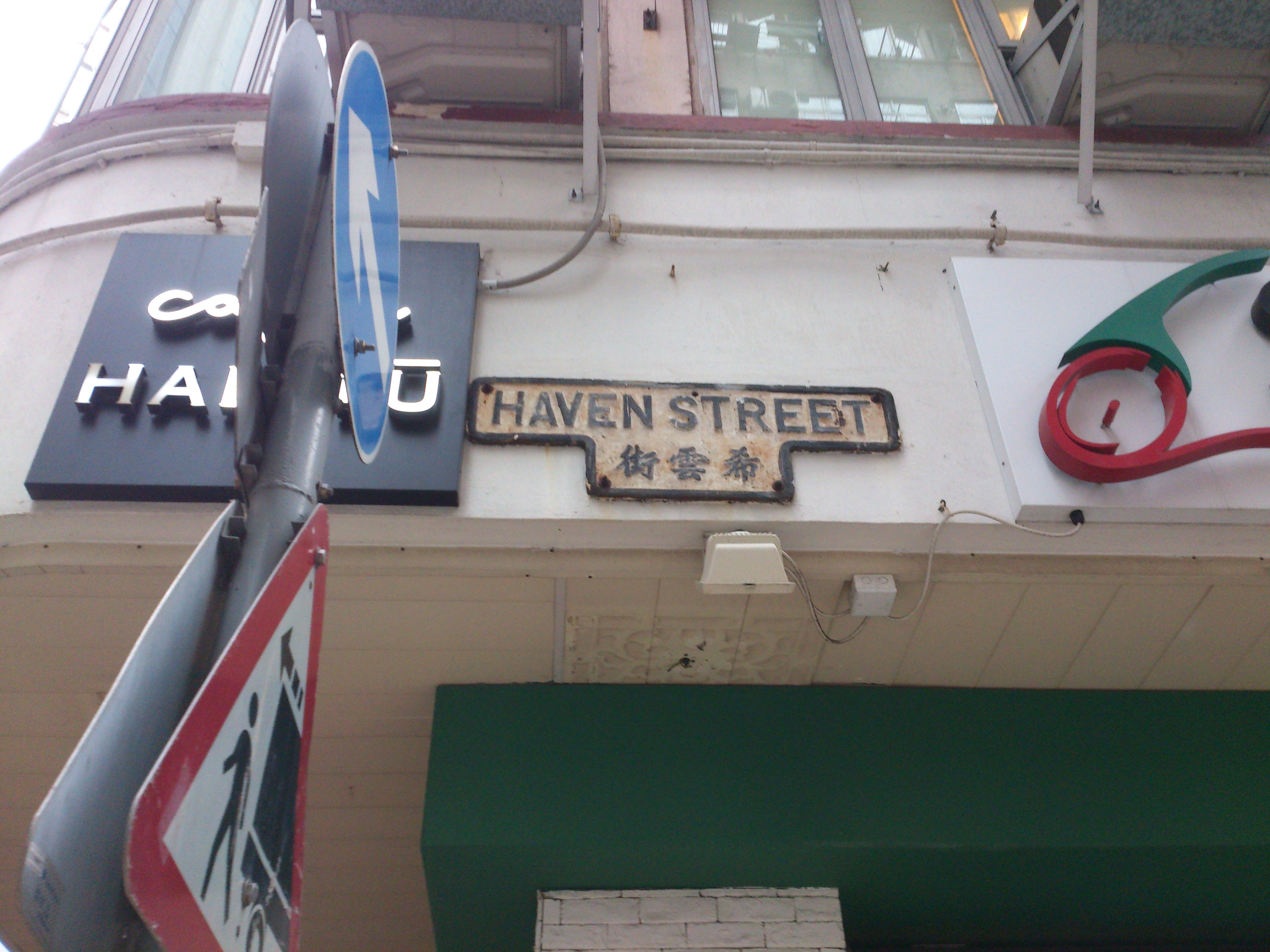
A pre-war street nameplate on Haven Street

Haven Street (Chinese: 希雲街; Jyutping: hei1 wan4 gaai1) is a street in Causeway Bay, Hong Kong Island. This is a cul-de-sac in the southern part of Causeway Bay, connected to Leighton Road on one side. The street is named after Haven, a group of ports in Essex and Suffolk on the east coast of England.

This street is lined with old buildings from the 1950s and 1960s, retaining the feel of Hong Kong from the 1960s to 1970s, with many independent shops selling nostalgic items. There are also many traditional bakeries, candy shops, cha chaan teng and grocery stores in the old buildings along the street. In recent years, there have been more and more coffee shops and restaurants selling various foreign foods on the streets.

A street nameplate of the pre-war style was also left on Haven Street, hanging over a tenement house.
