= Joshua Le Gallienne =

British artist

- Born: Harlow, Essex, England
- Years active: 2006–
- Style: Sound art, site-specific art

Joshua Le Gallienne (born in 1985) is a non-binary British artist based in Brighton. Working predominantly in sculpture, large-scale installation, and performance, Le Gallienne’s practice explores the materiality of sound within an artistic context. Their artworks have been exhibited internationally; at national institutions such as Ateneum and Ö1, and at major sonic arts festivals including Sonorities and Wien Modern.

In 2012, Le Gallienne began their Action Without Action project, which focuses on the production of acoustic sound without electronics or digital technologies. Works from this series employ unconventional materials such as pyrotechnics, ice, compressed air, balloons, carbonated liquids, and biodegradable plastics to create sound and movement.

Le Gallienne studied fine art at Hertford Regional College and later gained a degree in Digital Music & Sound Arts from the University of Brighton. Restraint, their graduate show sound installation, received the Burt Brill & Cardens Genius Prize in recognition of outstanding artistic achievement. After graduating, Le Gallienne taught on the Digital Music & Sound Arts course between 2012 and 2020.

Le Gallienne has received a number of awards, grants and accolades for their work; including the Francis Chagrin Award from Sound and Music in 2020 and the Sonic Arts Emerging Artist Exhibition Award from The Auxiliary in 2019. They have undertaken artist residencies in Czech Republic, Denmark, Finland, Greece, Luxembourg, and UK.

== Awards ==
- 2021–2022 BOOM Artist development scheme, Oxford Contemporary Music
- 2020 Francis Chagrin Award, Sound and Music
- 2020 Financial Hardship Fund, Help Musicians
- 2019 Sonic Arts Emerging Artist Exhibition Award, The Auxiliary
- 2012 Burt Brill & Cardens Prize in recognition of outstanding artistic achievement
