= Newhaven Fort =

Coastal fortress in south-east England

- Lewes; East Sussex; England
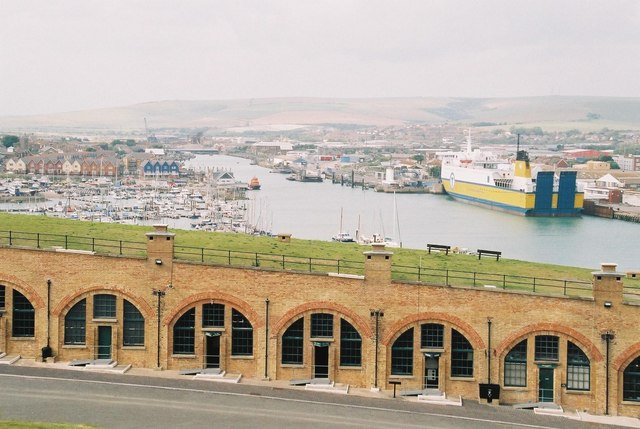
- Newhaven Fort - the casemates and the eastern rampart overlooking the harbour

Site information
- Owner: Lewes District Council
- Open to the public: Yes

Location
- Coordinates: 50.783184°N 0.054361°E

Site history
- Built: 1864-71
- In use: Museum
- Materials: Concrete; Brick; Earth

Newhaven Fort is a Palmerston fort built in the 19th century to defend the harbour at Newhaven, on the south coast of England. It was the largest defence work ever built in Sussex and is now open as a museum.

== History ==
=== Design and construction ===
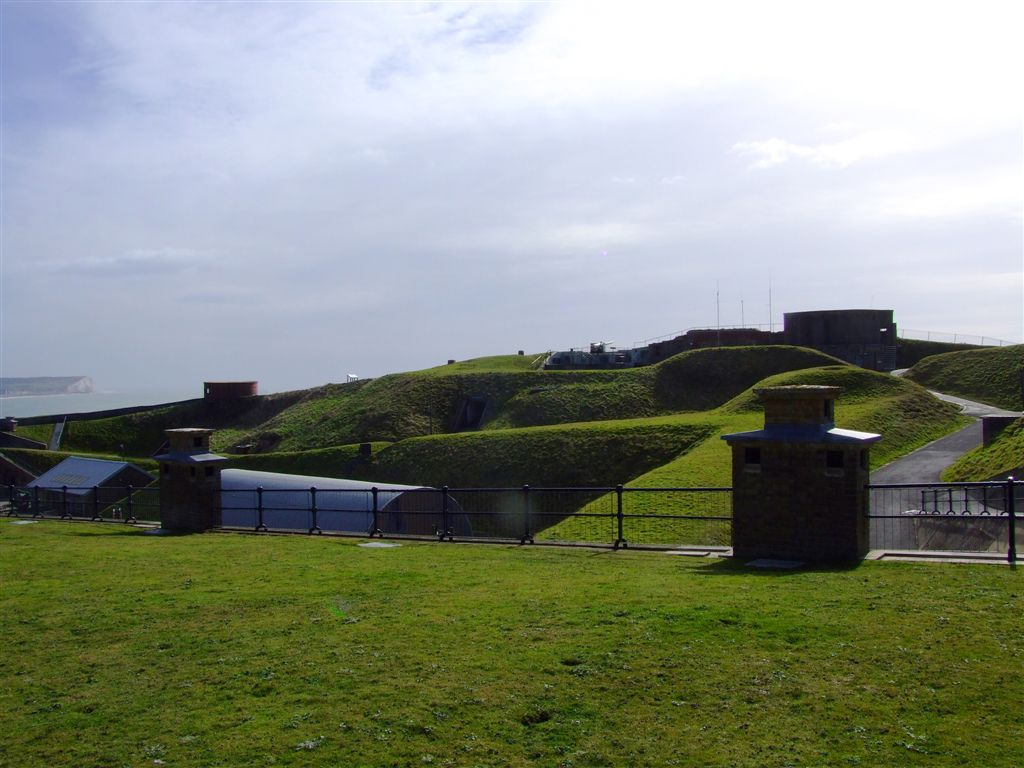
The fort viewed from the north.

A new fort to defend the port of Newhaven was a recommendation of the 1859 Royal Commission on the Defence of the United Kingdom, during the administration of Lord Palmerston. The design of the fort commenced in 1862 and was overseen by 22-year-old Anglo-Irish Lieutenant John Charles Ardagh, working from an office in Brighton. The site selected was on cliffs overlooking the harbour called Castle Hill, which was already occupied by a battery which originated in the mid-16th century. Instead of levelling the site, as was customary, Ardagh designed the fort to conform to the existing contours. A 40 foot wide moat protected the northern and western sides of the fort, which were lined with concrete, the first time this material had been used to any extent in a British fortification. The junction of the northern and western arms of the moat was protected by a counterscarp gallery and a sally port. The eastern side overlooking the harbour was protected by a short wet moat and by the embankment of the harbour. A caponier at the foot of the chalk cliffs was reached by a tunnel from within the fort. The garrison was to be housed in casemated barracks built into the northern and western ramparts. The main entrance at the north east angle was accessed by an "Equilibrium Bridge" designed and patented by Ardagh himself.

Work commenced in 1864, with a workforce of 250 men and three steam engines. Shingle for the concrete was taken from the beach and clay for the six million bricks required was found nearby. Work was completed in the summer of 1871 and the guns were emplaced in 1873.

=== Military service ===
The fort proper was originally armed on the eastern side in the 1870s with two 9-inch rifled muzzle-loading guns on Moncrieff disappearing carriages, the only such arrangement in the UK. From about 1906 the armament consisted of two modern 6-inch Mark VII breechloading naval guns, and two modern light QF 12-pounder guns for defence against torpedo boats.

The main 6-inch Mark VII guns were replaced in 1941 by a battery of BL 6-inch Mk 24 coastal guns (a modern coast defence version of the Mark VII built during World War II), which were located west of the fort. During the Second World War it was manned by the 521st (Kent and Sussex) Coast Regiment, Royal Artillery.

=== Preservation ===
The army vacated the fort in 1962. Restoration began in 1982 following a failed commercial redevelopment venture, and 6-inch Mk VII guns have been re-installed in the fort to approximate the 1906 - 1941 armament. The fort is preserved and maintained by Lewes District Council as Newhaven Fort.

=== Media ===
In 2015 the fort's network of tunnels was featured extensively in the British horror film, 'The Cutting Room'. In the BBC TV programme Great British Railway Journeys (Series 7, Episode 7), Michael Portillo visited Newhaven Fort.

=== Events ===
Fort Process, a multi-disciplinary sonic arts festival, has been held at the fort in 2014, 2016, and 2018. The festival organizer and arts use the fort-specific architecture and spaces as part of their temporary installations. The festival was largely started as an attempt to make use of the fort and help preserve its character.

== Image gallery ==
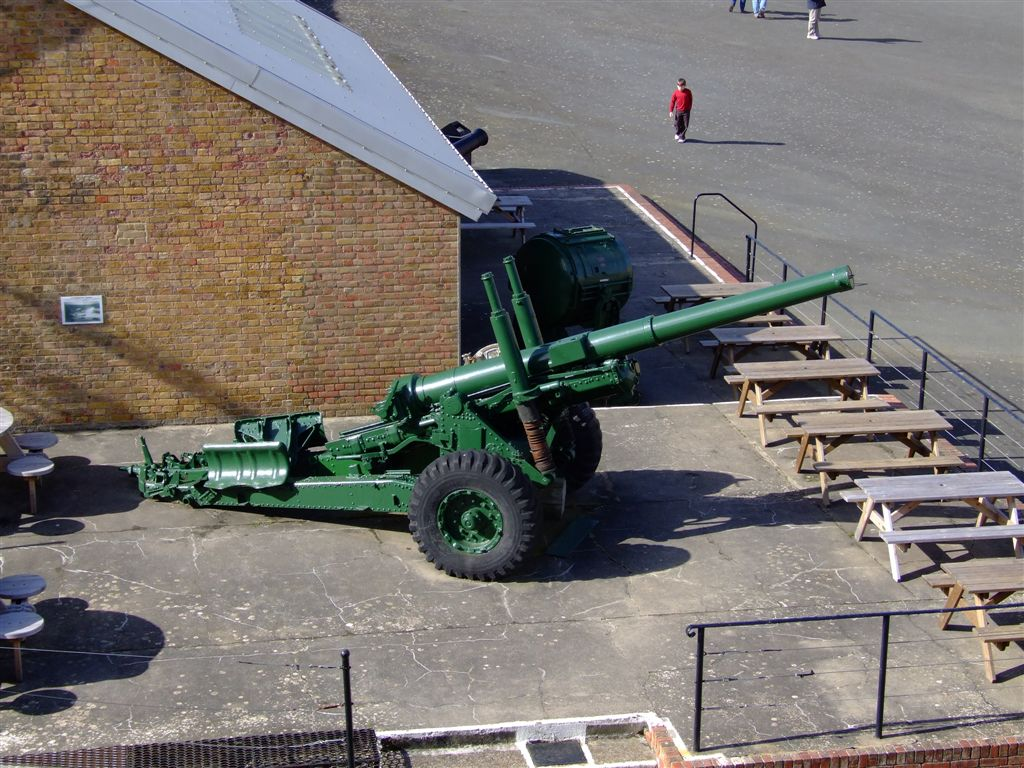
5.5-inch field gun from World War II outside the tearoom

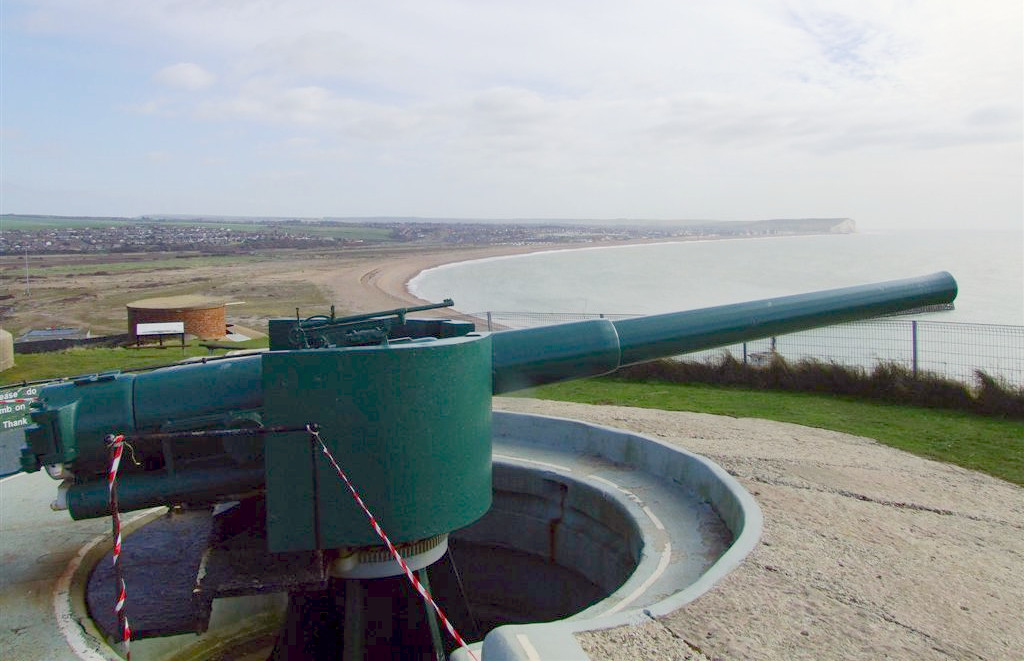
6-inch Mk VII gun which was installed in the 1980s to replace a previously removed gun

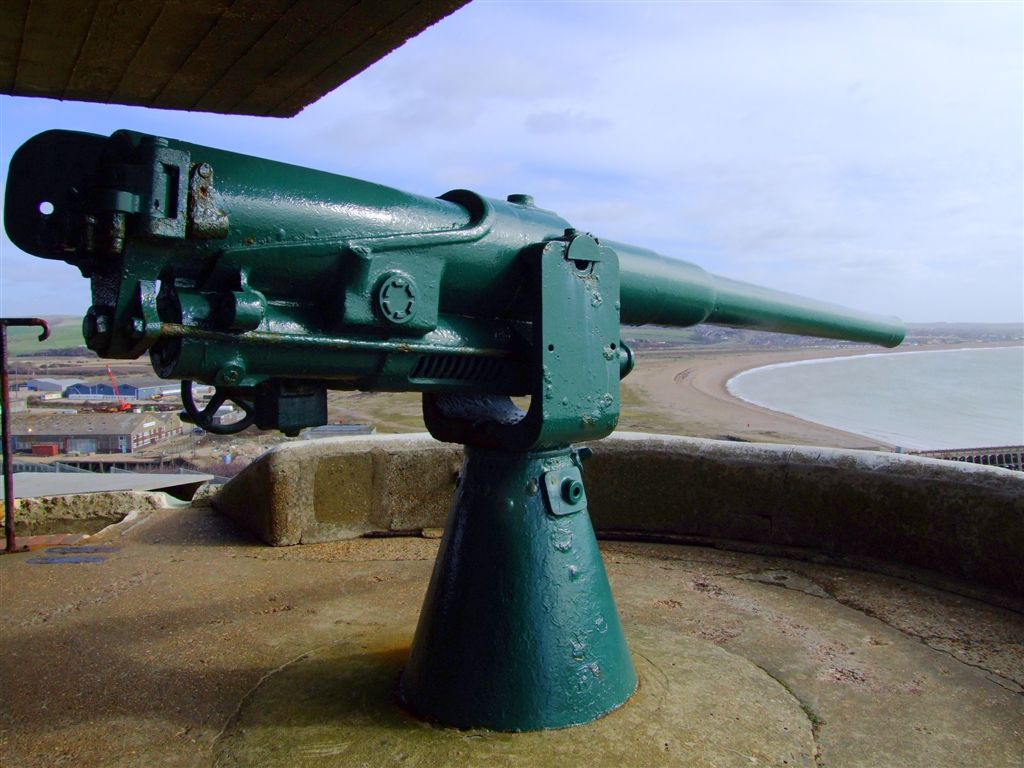
QF 12-pounder gun at the fort

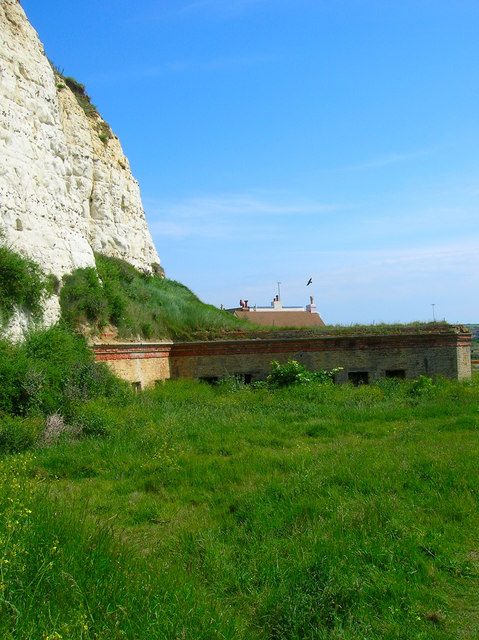
The caponier at the foot of the cliffs

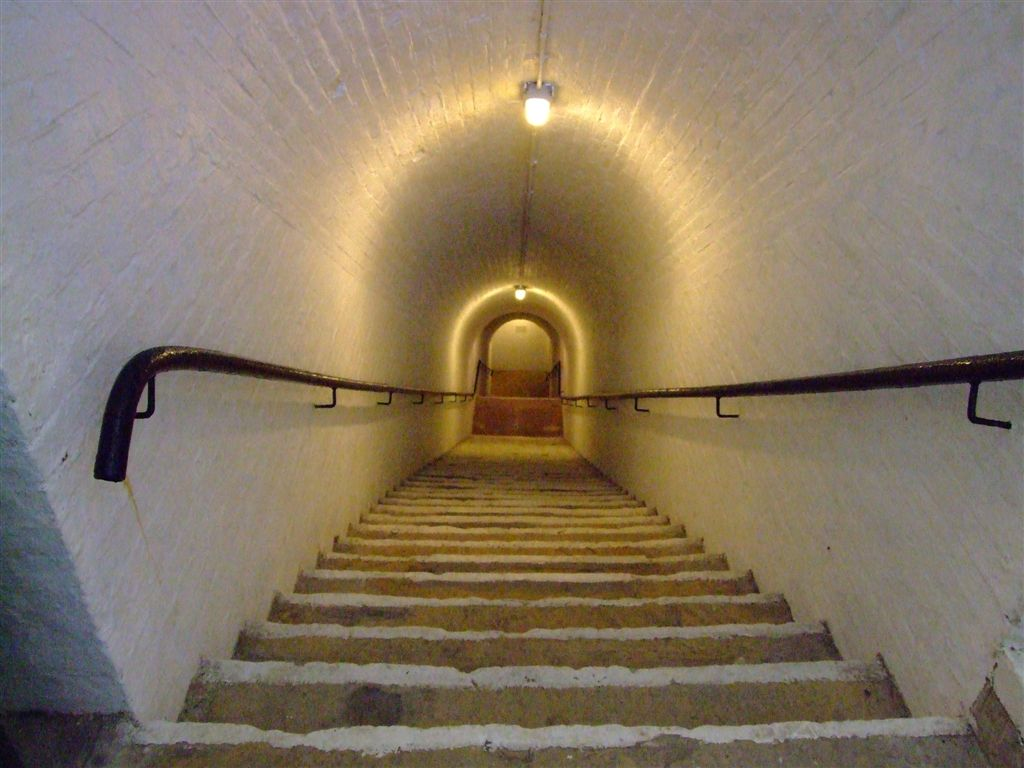
The stairs leading to the caponier

== See also ==
- Eastbourne Redoubt
- Pevensey Castle
