= Haven ports =

Group of five ports in Essex and Suffolk, England

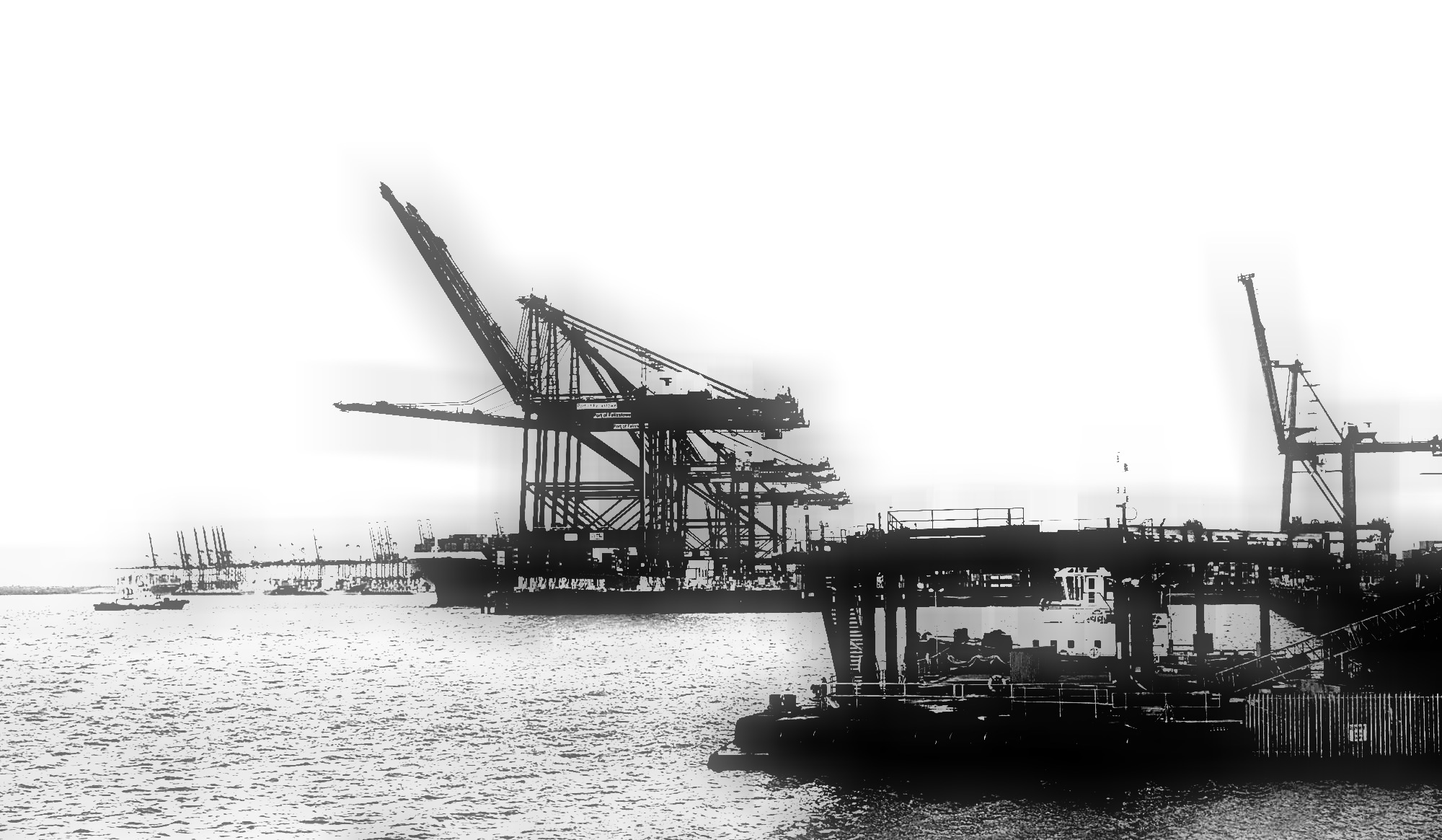
The docks at Felixstowe

Map of Haven ports

The Haven ports are a group of ports on the east coast of England. Traditionally, only the three deep-water ports of Ipswich, Harwich and Felixstowe, on the confluence of the River Orwell and River Stour, were included. The name has since changed to mean the following five ports:

- Port of Felixstowe in Suffolk
- Port of Ipswich in Suffolk
- Harwich International in Essex
- Harwich Navyard in Essex
- Mistley in Essex

== Local government ==
As part of the Redcliffe-Maud Report of the 1960s, it was proposed that the Haven ports be placed in a single unitary authority, known as "Ipswich, Suffolk & North East Essex". When Labour lost power in the 1970 election the Redcliffe-Maud plans were scrapped, but the new Conservative government had its own plans for local government reform and also wanted to unite the Haven ports. The government proposed to move the new Colchester and Tendring districts from Essex into Suffolk, so that all the Haven ports would be administered by the same county council.

Although there was some support for this, notably from Cuthbert Alport, former MP for Colchester, the Essex County Council opposed this since it would mean the loss of Colchester (including the main campus of the University of Essex) and the major port of Harwich. The county council launched a campaign against it, and as a result this part of the Conservative government's proposed changes were not implemented. The Local Government Act 1972 was eventually enacted, without major changes to the Essex-Suffolk border.

== See also ==
- Cinque Ports
