= 77th Regiment =

77th Regiment may refer to:

- 77th Regiment of Foot (disambiguation), British Army
- 77th Armor Regiment, United States Army
- 77th Field Artillery Regiment, United States Army
- 77th Infantry Regiment (France), French Army
- 77th Heavy Anti-Aircraft Regiment (disambiguation), British Army
- 77th Searchlight Regiment, Royal Artillery, British Army
- 77th (Duke of Lancaster's Own Yeomanry) Medium Regiment, Royal Artillery, British Army

== American Civil War regiments ==
- 77th Illinois Infantry Regiment
- 77th New York Infantry Regiment
- 77th Ohio Infantry Regiment
- 77th Pennsylvania Infantry Regiment

== See also ==
- 77th Brigade (disambiguation)
- 77th Division (disambiguation)
