= 77th =

77th is the ordinal form of the number 77. Seventy-seventh or 77th may also refer to:

- A fraction, 1/77, equal to one of 77 equal parts

== Geography ==
- 77th meridian east, a line of longitude
- 77th meridian west, a line of longitude
- 77th parallel north, a circle of latitude
- 77th parallel south, a circle of latitude
- 77th Street (disambiguation)

== Military ==
- 77th Group Army, People's Republic of China
- 77th Brigade (disambiguation)
- 77th Division (disambiguation)

== Other ==
- 77th century
- 77th century BC

== See also ==
- 77 (disambiguation)
