= 256th Brigade =

256th Brigade may refer to:

- 256th Brigade, Royal Field Artillery, United Kingdom
- 256th Infantry Brigade Combat Team, United States
