= 77 =

77 may refer to:

- 77 (number), the natural number following 76 and preceding 78
- one of the years 77 BC, AD 77, 1977, 2077
- 77 Frigga, a main-belt asteroid
- Book 77, the Rights of Man
- Tatra 77, a sedan

== Music ==
- 77 (band), a Spanish hard rock band
- 77, an album by Matt Kennon
- "77" (Peso Pluma and Eladio Carrión song), 2023
- Talking Heads: 77, debut album by Talking Heads
- 77 (Nude Beach album), 2014
- "77" (Billy Idol song), 2025, featuring Avril Lavigne

== See also ==
- 77th (disambiguation)
- '77 (disambiguation)
- The 7 July 2005 London bombings, also known as 7/7
- 7 and 7, an alcoholic drink sometimes called a 7-7
- Seven of Seven, the Japanese manga series
- List of highways numbered 77
