= 258th Brigade =

258th Brigade may refer to:

- 258th Marine Brigade, Republic of Vietnam
- 258th Brigade, Royal Field Artillery, United Kingdom
