= 77th Street station =

77th Street station may refer to:

- 77th Street (IRT Lexington Avenue Line), a subway station in Manhattan, New York
- 77th Street (BMT Fourth Avenue Line), a subway station in Brooklyn, New York

== See also ==
- 77th Street (disambiguation)
