= '77 =

'77 may refer to the year 1977. It may also refer to:

- Talking Heads: 77, a 1977 Talking Heads studio album
- '77 (film), a 2007 comedy film also known as 5-25-77

== See also ==
- 77 (disambiguation)
