= 77th Brigade =

77th Brigade may refer to:

== British India ==
- 77th Indian Infantry Brigade

== China ==
- 77th Brigade (People's Republic of China)
- 77th Motorized Infantry Brigade

== Ukraine ==
- 77th Airmobile Brigade

== United Kingdom ==
- 77th Brigade (United Kingdom)
- 77th Brigade, Royal Field Artillery, British Army unit during World War I
- 77th (Highland) Brigade, Royal Field Artillery, British Army unit after World War I

== United States ==
- 77th Combat Aviation Brigade
- 77th Sustainment Brigade

== See also ==
- 77th Division (disambiguation)
- 77th Regiment (disambiguation)
