= 77th Heavy Anti-Aircraft Regiment =

77th Heavy Anti-Aircraft Regiment may refer to:

- 77th Heavy Anti-Aircraft Regiment, Royal Artillery, a Regular British Army unit formed in 1947
- 77th (Welsh) Heavy Anti-Aircraft Regiment, Royal Artillery, a British Territorial Army unit formed in 1938
