= 77th Street =

77th Street may refer to:

- 77th Street (Manhattan), a road in New York City
- 77th Street (clothing), a Singapore clothing company founded in 1988

== See also ==
- 77th Street station (disambiguation)
