= 77th Regiment of Foot (disambiguation) =

77th Regiment of Foot may refer to:

- 77th Regiment of Foot or Earl Gower's Regiment (1745-1746)
- 77th Regiment of Foot (Montgomerie's Highlanders) (1758–1763)
- 77th Regiment of Foot (Atholl Highlanders) (1777–1783)
- 77th (East Middlesex) Regiment of Foot (1787–1881)
