= 77th Tank Division =

Tank division of the Soviet military

119th Motor Rifle Division (early 1970s – 1982) 77th Tank Division (1982–1987)
- Active: early 1970s – 1987
- Country: Soviet Union
- Branch: Soviet Army
- Type: Motorized Infantry; Armored
- Part of: 5th Army
- Garrison/HQ: Lyalichi

The 77th Tank Division was a mobilization tank division of the Soviet Army. The division was formed as the 119th Motor Rifle Division in the early 1970s. It became the 77th Tank Division in 1982 and was based at Lyalichi in Primorsky Krai. The division became a territorial training center in 1987 and a storage base in 1989.

== History ==
The 119th Motor Rifle Division was formed in the early 1970s as a result of increased Sino-Soviet tensions. The division was a mobilization division and included only an equipment set. It was part of the 5th Army. In 1982, it became the 77th Tank Division. The division became the 1008th Territorial Training Center in September 1987. On 1 July 1989, the training center became the 5510th Weapons and Equipment Storage Base. The storage base was disbanded in 1993.
