= 77 (band) =

Spanish hard rock band

- Origin: Barcelona, Spain
- Genres: Hard rock
- Years active: 2006–present
- Labels: Listenable Records, Century Media
- Members: Armand Valeta; LG Valeta; Dani Martín
- Past members: Andy Cobo; Guillem Martinez; Raw; Dolphin Riot

77 is a Spanish/Catalan hard rock band from Barcelona, formed in 2006 by brothers Armand Valeta and LG Valeta.

== History ==
The band's first lineup included Armand Valeta on vocals and rhythm guitar and LG Valeta on lead guitar, plus bassist Raw and drummer Dolphin Riot. They recorded an EP in 2007, and in 2009 they released their first full-length album, 21st Century Rock, in Spain via Weight Recordings. The band then began to tour extensively throughout Europe.

In 2010 they signed with the French label Listenable Records, which re-released 21st Century Rock in additional European countries and in Japan. While on tour in Sweden they met musician Nicke Andersson, then with The Hellacopters, who offered to serve as their producer. Their second album, High Decibels, was produced by Andersson and was released in late 2011.

The band's third album, Maximum Rock 'n' Roll, was co-produced by Andersson and Fred Estby and was released in late 2013. In 2014, Raw and Dolphin Riot left the band and were replaced by Guillem Martínez and Andy Cobo respectively. They signed with Century Media in early 2015. Later that year they released their fourth album, Nothing's Gonna Stop Us. The band then toured throughout Europe, first supporting Michael Schenker's Temple of Rock and then Danko Jones.

In 2017, Martinez was replaced by new bassist Dani Martin. Their fifth album Bright Gloom was released in 2018, followed by more touring throughout Europe. Bright Gloom reached the Spanish album chart.

== Discography ==
Albums

- 21st Century Rock (2009)
- High Decibels (2012)
- Maximum Rock 'n' Roll (2013)
- Nothing’s Gonna Stop Us (2015)
- Bright Gloom (2018)

== Band members ==
Current members

- Armand Valeta - lead vocals and rhythm guitar (2006 – present)
- LG Valeta - lead guitar (2006 – present)
- Dani Martín - bass guitar (2017 – present)

Former members

- Andy Cobo - drums (2014 – 2020)
- Guillem Martinez - bass guitar (2014 - 2017)
- Raw - bass guitar (2006 - 2014)
- Dolphin Riot - drums (2006 - 2014)
