= 77th Brigade (People's Republic of China) =

Brigade of the People's Liberation Army

77th Motorized Infantry Brigade
- Country: (China)
- Type: Motorized infantry
- Garrison/HQ: Haiyang, Shandong

The 77th Motorized Infantry Brigade is one of the five maneuver elements of the 26th Group Army in the Jinan Military Region based in Weifang, Shandong. In 2017 the brigade was transferred to the PLA Navy Marine Corps.
