= 77th Division =

77th Division or 77th Infantry Division may refer to:

== Infantry divisions ==
- 77th Division (People's Republic of China)
- 77th Infantry Division (Wehrmacht), Germany
- 77th Reserve Division, German Empire
- 77th Infantry Division of Khurasan, Iran
- 77th Division (Imperial Japanese Army)
- 77th Infantry Division (Russian Empire)
- 77th Guards Rifle Division, Soviet Union
- 77th Rifle Division, Soviet Union, 1942–1957, previously the 77th Azerbaijani Mountain Rifle Red Banner Division
- 77th Division (Spain)
- 77th Infantry Division (United Kingdom)
- 77th Infantry Division (United States)

== Armoured divisions ==
- 77th Tank Division, Soviet Union

== See also ==
- List of military divisions by number
- 77th Brigade (disambiguation)
- 77th Regiment (disambiguation)
