= 1st Renfrew and Dumbarton Artillery Volunteers =

Military unit of Britain's Volunteer Force, later its Territorial Force

1st Renfrew & Dumbarton Artillery Volunteers 3rd Highland Brigade, RFA 77th (Highland) Field Regiment, RA 277th (Argyll & Sutherland Highlanders) Field Regiment, RA
- Active: 1860–1969
- Country: United Kingdom
- Branch: Territorial Army
- Type: Artillery Regiment
- Role: Garrison artillery Position artillery Field artillery
- Part of: 51st (Highland) Division
- Garrison/HQ: Greenock
- Engagements: Battle of the Somme; Battle of France; Battle of Alamein; Tunisia; Sicily; Italy; Normandy; North West Europe; Rhine Crossing

The 1st Renfrew and Dumbarton Artillery Volunteers was a part-time unit of the British Army's Royal Artillery founded in Scotland in 1860. During the First World War, it served with 51st (Highland) Division at the Battle of the Somme before being broken up. In the Second World War, the regiment saw action in the Battle of France, in the campaigns in North Africa, Sicily, Italy, the Greek Civil War and in North West Europe. It continued in the postwar Territorial Army until 1969.

== Volunteer Force ==
The enthusiasm for the Volunteer movement following an invasion scare in 1859 saw the creation of many Rifle and Artillery Volunteer Corps composed of part-time soldiers eager to supplement the Regular British Army in time of need. Three Artillery Volunteer Corps (AVCs) were formed in Renfrewshire and three more in neighbouring Dunbartonshire in 1860, and on 22 August 1863 all six were included in the 1st Administrative Brigade, Renfrewshire Artillery Volunteers, under the command of Lieutenant-Colonel John Scott, with its headquarters (HQ) at Greenock:

- 1st (Greenock) Renfrewshire AVC formed 20 January 1860, four batteries by 1867
- 2nd (Greenock) Renfrewshire AVC formed 20 January 1860, absorbed into 1st in 1864
- 3rd (Greenock) Renfrewshire AVC formed 20 January 1860, absorbed into 1st in 1864
- 1st (Helensburgh) Dunbartonshire AVC formed 9 February 1860
- 2nd (Rosneath) Dunbartonshire AVC formed March 1860, moved to Kilcreggan 1866, disbanded in 1872
- 3rd (Dumbarton) Dunbartonshire AVC formed 24 December 1860, increased to two batteries 22 March 1869

When the AVCs were consolidated in May 1880, the administrative brigade became the 1st Renfrewshire (Renfrew and Dumbarton) Artillery Volunteers, shortly afterwards adopting the title of 1st Renfrew and Dumbarton Artillery Volunteers with the following organisation:

- HQ, Greenock
- Nos 1–4 Batteries, Greenock
- No 5 Battery, Helensburgh
- No 6–7 Batteries, Dumbarton

=== Position Artillery ===
The AVCs were intended to serve as garrison artillery manning fixed defences, but a number of the early units manned semi-mobile 'position batteries' of smooth-bore field guns pulled by agricultural horses. The War Office (WO) refused to pay for these batteries and they died out. However, the concept was revived in 1888 when some Volunteer batteries were reorganised as position artillery to work alongside the Volunteer infantry brigades. In 1889, the 1st Renfrew & Dumbarton AV was issued with a position battery of 40-pounder Rifled Breech-Loading guns, which were manned by two of the Greenock batteries, the remaining batteries moving to Port Glasgow. In 1892, the position battery was numbered 1st and the remaining garrison batteries were redesignated companies (Nos 2–3 at Port Glasgow, 4 at Helensburgh, and 5–6 at Dumbarton).

=== Royal Garrison Artillery ===
In 1882, all the AVCs were affiliated to one of the territorial garrison divisions of the Royal Artillery (RA) and the 1st Renfrew & Dumbarton AV became part of the Scottish Division. In 1889, the structure was altered, and the corps joined the Southern Division. In 1899, the RA was divided into separate field and garrison branches, and the artillery volunteers were all assigned to the Royal Garrison Artillery (RGA). When the divisional structure was abolished their titles were changed, the unit becoming the 1st Renfrew and Dumbarton Royal Garrison Artillery (Volunteers) on 1 January 1902.

The unit's HQ and drill batteries were at 8 South Street, Greenock, and gun practice was carried out at Irvine. It also had a carbine range at Drumshantie, near Greenock. During the Second Boer War 72 men of the unit volunteered for service overseas, but only three were accepted.

== Territorial Force ==
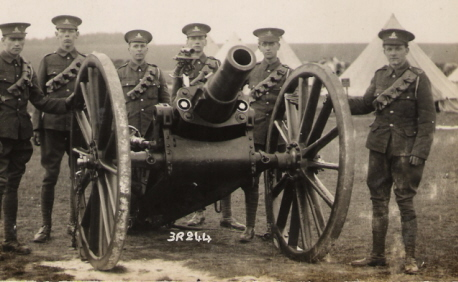
BL 5-inch howitzer and TF gunners in camp before the First World War

When the Volunteers were subsumed into the new Territorial Force (TF) under the Haldane Reforms of 1908, the Dunbartonshire personnel formed two companies of the Clyde and Forth Royal Garrison Artillery while the Renfrewshire men transferred to the Royal Field Artillery (RFA) to form the III (or 3rd) Highland (Howitzer) Brigade, RFA, at North Street, Greenock, with the following organisation: (Note: Originally the Renfrewshire unit was to have been the IV (or 4th) Highland Bde, but this was changed to III (3rd) by October 1908.)

- 1st Renfrewshire (Howitzer) Battery
- 2nd Renfrewshire (Howitzer) Battery
- 3rd Highland (Howitzer) Ammunition Column at Cathcart
  - Renfrewshire Small Arm Section Ammunition Column

The unit was part of the TF's Highland Division. The batteries were each issued with four 5-inch howitzers.

== First World War ==
=== Mobilisation ===
A warning order of the imminence of war was received at the Highland Division's HQ on 29 July 1914, and the order to mobilise was received at 17.35 on Tuesday 4 August 1914. Mobilisation began the following day at unit drill halls. On 12 August, the division was ordered to concentrate at Bedford and entrainment began on 15 August. Concentration was completed by 17 August and the division formed part of First Army (Home Forces) in Central Force.

On the outbreak of war, units of the Territorial Force were invited to volunteer for Overseas Service: the majority of men in the Highland Division did so. On 15 August; the WO issued instructions to separate those men who had signed up for Home Service only, and form these into reserve units. Then; on 31 August; the formation of a reserve or 2nd Line unit was authorised for each 1st Line unit where 60 per cent or more of the men had volunteered for Overseas Service. The titles of these 2nd Line units would be the same as the original, but distinguished by a '2/' prefix. In this way, duplicate batteries, brigades and divisions were created, mirroring those TF formations being sent overseas.

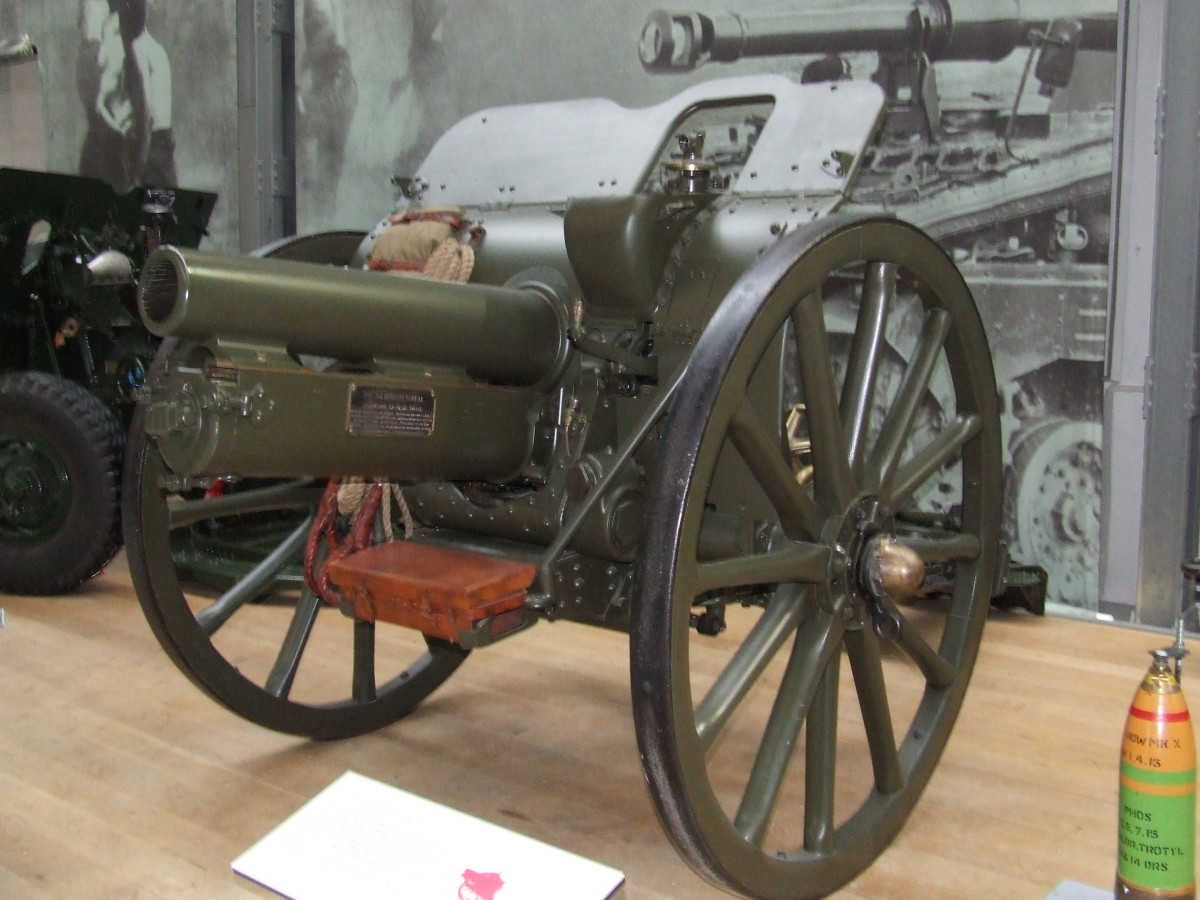
4.5-inch howitzer at the Royal Artillery Museum.

=== 1/III Highland Brigade ===
During the winter of 1914–15, the 1st Line units underwent war training, and a number left to join the British Expeditionary Force (BEF) on the Western Front. The division was warned for overseas service on 13 April and on 3 May it crossed to France, the artillery embarking at Southampton for Le Havre. The Highland Division completed its concentration at Lillers, Busnes and Robecq by 6 May and, on 12 May, it was officially numbered as the 51st (Highland) Division.

==== Western Front ====
The raw division was soon in action at the Battle of Festubert (18–25 May). The 51st (Highland) and 1st Canadian Division together formed 'Alderson's Force', which relieved the attacking divisions at the end of the first day's fighting. It was also engaged at the Battle of Givenchy (15–16 June). Afterwards; the division was moved to a quiet front to gain more experience. 1/III Highland Bde's old 5-inch howitzers were replaced with modern 4.5-inch howitzers on 11 January 1916, and on 8 February the brigade was joined by a battery from CLI (1st County Palatine) Howitzer Brigade (30th Division), a 'Kitchener's Army' unit raised by the Earl of Derby in Lancashire in 1914; this became R (H) Bty in 1/III Highland Bde.

In May 1916, the TF brigades of the RFA received numbers, the 1/III Highland becoming CCLVIII (or 258) Brigade, and were reorganised: 1/1st Renfrewshire Bty became D (H) Bty in CCLV (1/I Highland) Bde, R (H) Bty became D (H) Bty in CCLVI (1/II Highland) Bde, and 1/2nd Renfrewshire Bty became D (H) Bty in CCLX (1/I Lowland) Bde. The D batteries of those three brigades joined and became A, B and C Btys of CCVLVIII Bde, each equipped with four 18-pounder guns. The brigade ammunition columns were abolished at the same time, and absorbed within the divisional ammunition column.

==== Somme ====
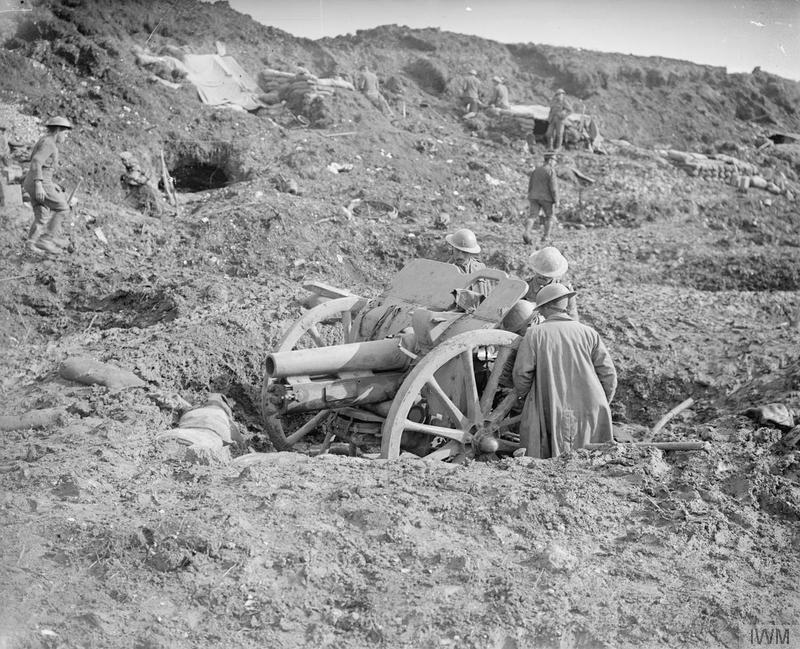
4.5-inch gun dug into a shellhole during the Battle of the Somme.

In July, 51st (Highland) Division joined in the Somme Offensive. An attack on 14 July had failed to capture the dominating ground of High Wood, and 51st (H) Division was tasked with renewing the attack on High Wood a week later. A night attack was to be tried: the bombardment began at 19.00 on 22 July, under the direction of low-flying artillery observation aircraft. German sources reported that the shelling was of 'painful accuracy' and prevented the troops in High Wood from being relieved, despite the number of casualties. At 01.30 the following morning, the division attacked, but by 03.00 they were back on their start line having suffered heavy casualties. British gunners had difficulty supporting attacks on High Wood, because they had to fire over Bazentin Ridge. The low elevation of the guns meant that shells skimmed the British trenches, the margin for error was small and numerous complaints were made that British infantry casualties were caused by friendly fire. Worn guns, defective ammunition and inaccurate information about the location of British infantry positions were blamed for short-shooting. The division was withdrawn from the front on 7 August for rest and reorganisation.

On 23 August, CCLVIII Bde was broken up, with A Bty and the Right Section of C Bty going to CCLV Bde and B Bty and Left Section of C Bty going to CCLVI Bde, in each case to bring their 18-pounder batteries up to a strength of six guns each. The former gunners of III Highland Bde continued to serve with their new units through the rest of the First World War.

=== 2/III Highland Brigade ===
Recruiting for the 2nd Line unit was good, and 2/III Highland completed at Greenock by the end of 1914. 2nd Highland Division formed in January 1915 (numbered as 64th (2nd Highland) Division in August) but the lack of equipment and need to supply drafts to 1st Line units delayed training. The division was not fully assembled around Perth until August 1915, with 2/III Highland Brigade at Brechin, moving into Perth for winter quarters in November. In January 1916, the division was assigned to the 'Eighth New Army', then in March it moved south to Norfolk and joined Northern Army (Home Forces). By May, the 2/III Highland Bde had received 4.5-inch howitzers and that month it was numbered, becoming CCCXXIII (323) (H) Brigade. However, the brigade was immediately broken up, with the batteries joining CCCXX (2/I Highland) and CCCXXI (2/II Highland) brigades as their D (H) batteries. 64th (H) Division remained a training organisation in Norfolk until it was disbanded after the Armistice with Germany.

== Interwar ==
The 3rd Highland (Howitzer) Brigade re-formed in 51st (Highland) Division in 1920. When the TF was reorganised as the Territorial Army (TA) in 1921, the brigade was redesignated 77th (Highland) Brigade, RFA with the following organisation:

- HQ at 8 South Street, Greenock
- 305 (Renfrew) Field Bty at Greenock
- 306 (Renfrew) Field Bty at Greenock
- 307 (Renfrew) Field Bty at Mints Avenue, Cathcart
- 308 (Renfrew) Field Bty (Howitzers) at Greenock

In 1924, the RFA was subsumed into the Royal Artillery (RA), and the word 'Field' was inserted into the titles of its brigades and batteries.

The establishment of a TA divisional artillery brigade was four 6-gun batteries, three equipped with 18-pounders, and one with 4.5-inch howitzers. However, the batteries only held four guns in peacetime. The guns and their first-line ammunition wagons were still horsedrawn and the battery staffs were mounted. Partial mechanisation was carried out from 1927, but the guns retained iron-tyred wheels until pneumatic tyres began to be introduced just before the Second World War.

In 1938, the RA modernised its nomenclature and a lieutenant-colonel's command was designated a 'regiment' rather than a 'brigade'; this applied to TA field brigades from 1 November 1938.

== Second World War ==
=== Mobilisation ===
The TA was doubled in size following the Munich Crisis of 1938, with existing units splitting to form duplicates before the outbreak of the Second World War. Part of the reorganisation was that field regiments changed from four six-gun batteries to an establishment of two batteries, each of three four-gun troops. For the 77th (Highland) Fd Rgt, this resulted in the following organisation from 12 June 1939:

77th (Highland) Field Regiment

- Regimental HQ (RHQ) at Greenock
- 305 (Renfrew) Field Bty at Greenock
- 306 (Renfrew) Field Bty at Greenock

128th Field Regiment

- RHQ at Greenock
- 307 (Renfrew) Field Bty at Glasgow
- 308 (Renfrew) Field Bty at Greenock

=== 77th (Highland) Field Regiment ===
On the outbreak of war, 77th (Highland) Field Rgt mobilised in 51st (H) Division under the command of Lt-Col W.H. Denholm, still equipped with its First World War-era 18-pounders and 4.5-inch howitzers (one 12-gun battery of each), though now on pneumatic tyres and towed by gun tractors. The division moved to Bordon in January and arrived in France to join the new British Expeditionary Force (BEF) on 29 January 1940. On 19 February, the regiment exchanged with a field regiment of 4th Division at Croix, near Roubaix, and remained with this Regular Army formation for the rest of the war.

==== Battle of France ====
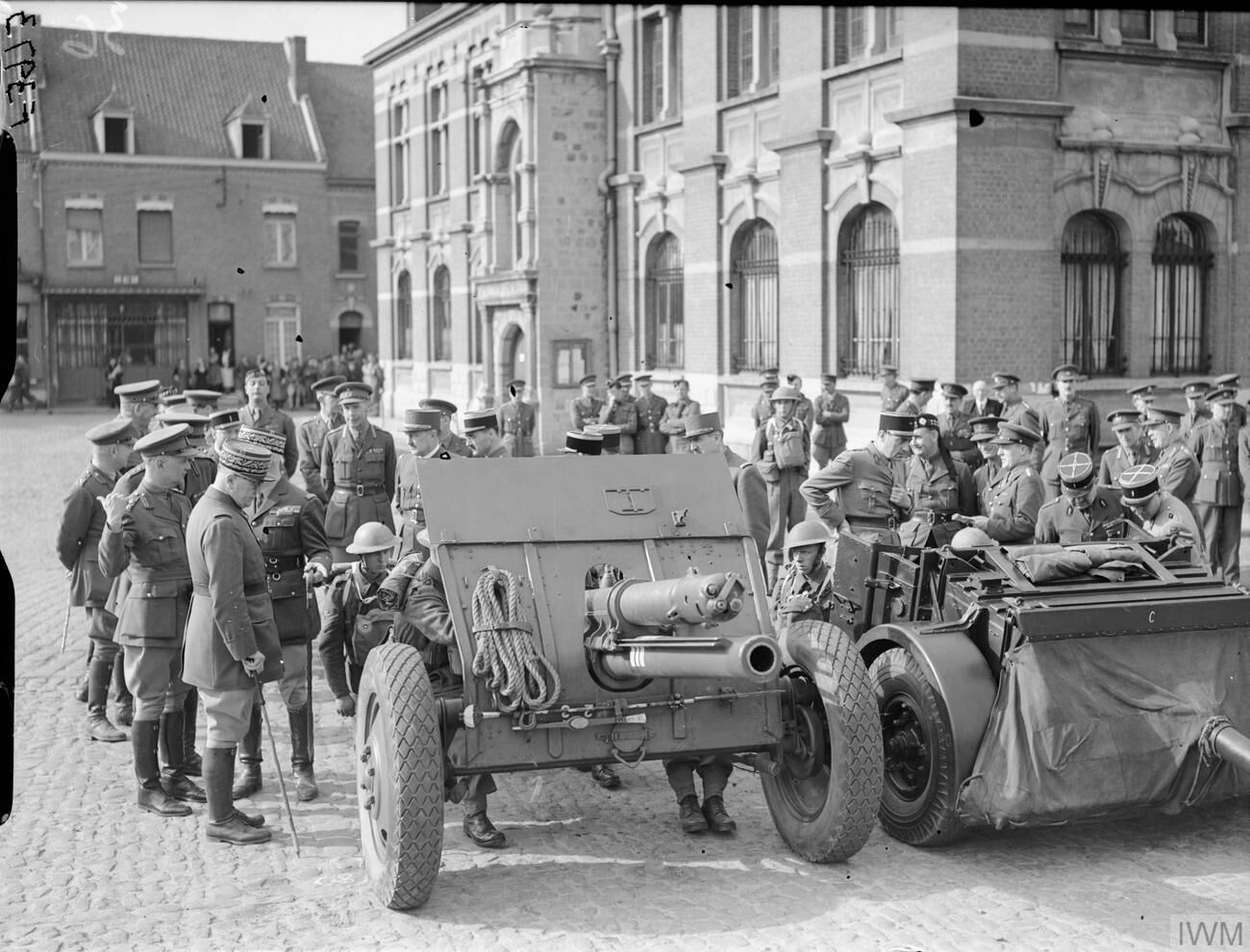
An 18-pounder being inspected in France, April 1940.

The Battle of France began on 10 May with the German invasion of the Low Countries. The BEF responded by executing the pre-arranged Plan D, advancing into Belgium to take up defences along the River Dyle; 4th Division was in support of the river line. However, the Panzers of Army Group A had broken through the Ardennes and threatened the BEF's flank, so on 16 May it began to withdraw to the River Escaut. The first 'bound' was back to the line of the River Senne during the night of 16/17 May, the second took the BEF back to the River Dendre the following night. The Belgian forces retired more rapidly, and 4th Division found its left flank was open, so there was hard and confused rearguard fighting as it withdrew across the Dendre and back to the Escaut.

By 20 May, the BEF was established on the Escaut line, but on 22 May the Germans began making determined attacks against 4th Division's positions. Worse, the BEF was now cut off from the south as the Panzers reached the coast at Boulogne. It began to withdraw into a 'pocket' round Dunkirk from which it was preparing to evacuate (Operation Dynamo). 4th Division held the northernmost sector of the east-facing line, first on the old Franco-Belgian frontier, then back on the River Lys and the Ypres-Comines Canal, where enemy attacks were driven back. The division was then drawn back into the shrinking pocket to protect the coastal flank, where the Belgian army had surrendered. The division defended La Panne while the evacuation proceeded. The men then had to destroy their remaining equipment and march 10 miles (16 km) along the beach to be picked up at Dunkirk on 31 May.

==== Home Defence ====
On return to the UK, the regiment re-formed at Charmouth in Dorset. 4th Division joined V Corps in anti-invasion defences on the South Coast on 19 June. Units returned from Dunkirk were progressively brought back up to strength and re-equipped with whatever was available. By September 1940, 77th (Highland) Fd Rgt was stationed at Barton-on-Sea, equipped with old French 75 mm guns. In December, it received modern 25-pounders. One of the lessons learned from the Battle of France was that the two-battery organisation did not work: field regiments were intended to support an infantry brigade of three battalions. As a result, they were reorganised into three 8-gun batteries, each of two four-gun troops of 25-pounders with Quad gun tractors. It was not until late 1940 that the RA had enough trained battery staffs to carry out the reorganisation. 77th (H) Field Rgt accordingly formed 'X' Bty, which was numbered as 455 Fd Bty by February 1941.

At the end of October 1942, 4th Division was assigned to I Corps, but was then sent as reinforcements for First Army after the Allied landings in North Africa (Operation Torch).

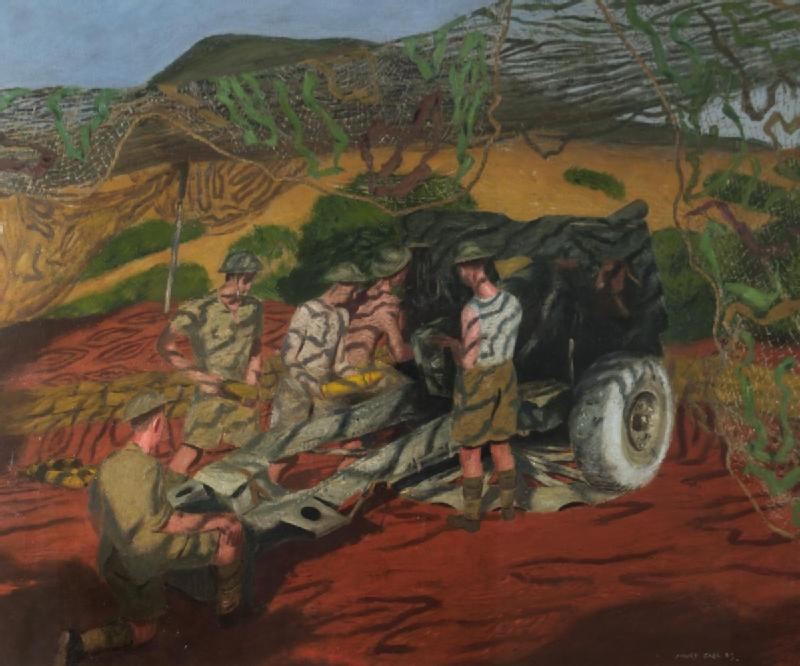
Painting by Henry Carr of a camouflaged 25-pounder in action near Medjez el Bab.

==== North Africa ====
4th Division sailed on 12 March 1943 and began landing in North Africa on 23 March. It joined V Corps in the forward area in Tunisia between 3 and 6 April, in time to join in the next phase of the offensive towards Tunis. The division advanced against stiff opposition (the Battle of Oued Zarga, 7–15 April) and was held up in the hill country. The Germans then retaliated with a spoiling attack at Medjez el Bab on 21 April which endangered the British artillery lines preparing for the final assault on Tunis (Operation Vulcan). This attack was beaten off, and the following day the Allied offensive opened, with 4th Division launching its attack on 24 April, though the enemy fought back hard and progress was slow.

The last phase of Vulcan (Operation Strike) began on 5 May with 4th Division attacking a ridge on the Medjez el Bab–Tunis road the following day. The assault began at 03.00 with artillery bombardment including counter-battery (CB) fire, concentrations on specific targets, and barrages to assist the advancing infantry. In two hours 16,632 shells fell on the enemy facing 4th Division, and in the first 24 hours of the battle the whole artillery support averaged 368 rounds per gun (rpg). This weight of support broke the initially stiff enemy opposition, and the division fought its way methodically forward from one objective to another according to timetable. By 12 May the Allies had fought their way into Tunis and the Axis forces surrendered next day

After the Tunisian Campaign ended, 4th Division remained in North Africa until 16 December 1943, when it went by sea to Egypt. Then, on 14 February 1944, it sailed from Egypt to join in the Italian Campaign.

==== Italy ====
4th Division became operational in XIII Corps in April. The division's role in the Spring offensive was an assault crossing of the Gari river (Operation Diadem). Six hundred rpg of field gun ammunition was stockpiled for the attack, which was launched at 23.00 on 11 May with 40 minutes of CB and counter-mortar fire, after which the field guns began firing concentrations and a Creeping barrage that advanced at a rate of 100 yards (91 m) every six minutes. The assault troops got across the river, but fell behind timetable, so at daybreak they were ordered to hold the bridgehead while the artillery switched to firing defensive fire (DF) tasks to form a protective ring round them. With this support they held on all day against small but fierce counter-attacks, then bridging efforts re-commenced after dark. By the morning of 13 May the bridge was open and armour and infantry reinforcements crossed to relieve the defenders and enlarge the bridgehead. On 14 May the advance began behind a barrage, and XIII Corps was able to advance up the Liri valley to outflank the Monte Cassino position.

After this fighting, 4th Division was withdrawn into Army Reserve, rejoining XIII Corps after the capture of Rome in the first week of June for the pursuit to Lake Trasimeno. On 21 and 22 June, the division moved out of Corps Reserve and took over part of the front facing the German Trasimene Line. On 24 June, it had a hard fight to clear Vaiano, held by the 1st Parachute Division. Next, XIII Corps moved on Arezzo, and the guns of 4th Division fired in support of 6th Armoured Division and 2nd New Zealand Division as they attacked the hills in front of the town. 4th Division then continued the advance towards Florence, clearing the Chianti mountains and the west bank of the Arno against tough opposition as the Germans slowly gave ground. Florence was entered on 4 August, then 4th Division had a fierce battle to clear the Incontro ridge in a loop of the Arno. It completed this on 8 August and was relieved.

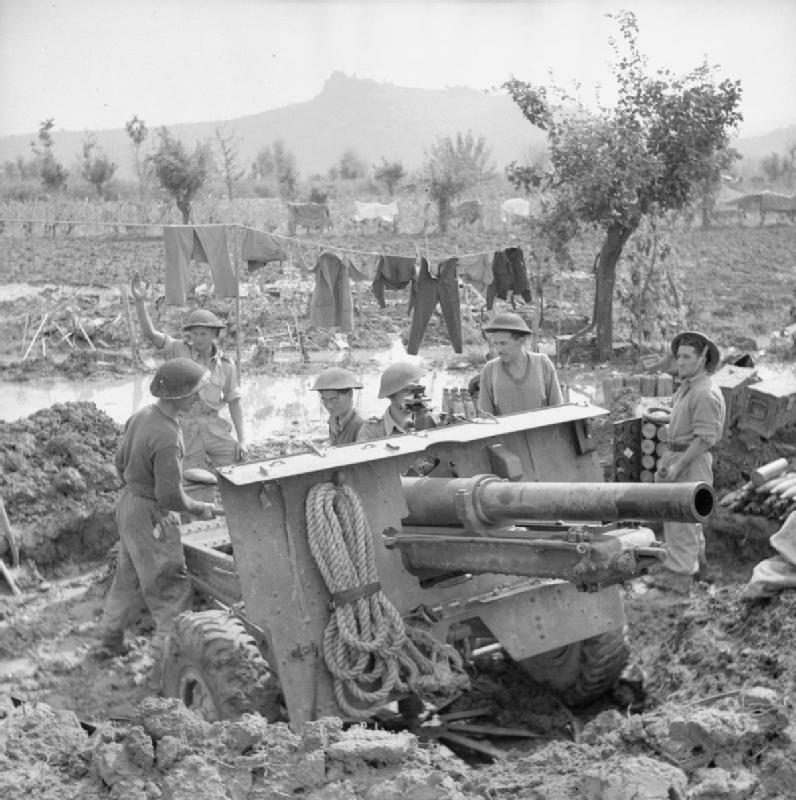
A 25-pdr in a waterlogged position in Italy, October 1944.

The next major attack was Operation Olive, aimed at breaching the Gothic Line, where 4th Divisional artillery supported the initial attack by I Canadian Corps on 25 August. 4th Division itself was held in readiness at Foligno for the pursuit towards the River Po. Breaching the successive defence lies proved slow and costly, and 4th Division remained waiting for the breakthrough. A new phase began on 12/13 September against the Rimini Line, which began with a series of massed artillery bombardments. 4th Division began to pass through the attacking Canadians to continue the advance but got held up. It continued on the following days and crossed the Ausa during the night of 17/18 September behind artillery preparations fired by its own guns assisted by those of several other divisions.

Operations in Italy then began to bog down in a series of river crossings. 4th Division's next major operation was to seize a bridgehead over the Savio on 19 October, where the bridge was isolated by artillery fire in an attempt to prevent its destruction. However, it was demolished just as the infantry patrols reached it, and the division had to make an assault crossing at Cesena the following day. When the Germans fell back to the Ronco, attempts to 'bounce' more crossings on the night of 25/26 October met with disaster. The division got across the Ronco on 31 October, but was halted by German troops defending Forlì Airport. It attacked during the night of 7/8 November while the artillery concentrated on the airfield buildings. The defenders pulled back to the Montone on 8/9 November. 4th Division then fought its way up a narrow corridor between the Montone and the Ravaldino Canal, utilising air observation post aircraft to direct artillery fire onto dug-in German heavy tanks. The division finally broke through on 12 November, the artillery laying 'bomb lines' of coloured smoke shells to direct air attacks. 4th Division's last major operation in the campaign was a pre-dawn attack on 21 November to cross exposed ground up to cross the Cosina, but little went right, and only one company got across. Once the neighbouring II Polish Corps crossed, on 25 November, however, the division made good progress, fanning out north of the Via Aemilia.

==== Greece ====
4th Division was now relieved from the front line. It was intended to send it to the Middle East for rest, but it was diverted to Greece where civil war (the so-called Dekemvriana) had broken out after the withdrawal of German occupying forces. Some of the infantry were airlifted, the remainder of the division without heavy equipment was sent by sea to Faliron Bay on 12 December. The artillery regiments were reorganised as infantry for internal security duties and guarding prisoners, any artillery support required being provided by Royal Navy warships. By 16 December, the division had established defences round the base and began methodically clearing the road from Faliron to Athens on 17 December while the dismounted gunners and Greek National Guard defended the base and communications. Bitter fighting went on into the new year. The Greek People's Liberation Army (ELAS) began withdrawing from central Athens on 27 December, and the British started an offensive on 2 January 1945. ELAS retreated completely from Athens on 5 January, although fighting went on in other parts of the country.

77th (Highland) Field Regiment remained in Greece until after the end of the Second World War. It was placed in suspended animation on 20 February 1946.

=== 128th (Highland) Field Regiment ===
128th (Highland) Field Rgt mobilised in 9th (Highland) Infantry Division, the 2nd Line duplicate of 51st (H) Division. It remained training in Scottish Command until 7 August 1940 when 9th (H) Division was redesignated as 51st (H) Division to replace the original formation, most of which had been captured at Saint-Valery-en-Caux at the end of the Battle of France. 128th Field Rgt formed its third battery, 492 Fd Bty, on 1 March 1941when the regiment was stationed at Rosemarkie. It was authorised to use its parent's 'Highland' subtitle on 17 February 1942.

After two more years' training in Scotland, the division sailed for Egypt on 16 June 1942, landing on 12 August. 128th (Highland) Fd Rgt (it received its Highland subtitle in 1942) was equipped with 24 x 25-pounder guns.

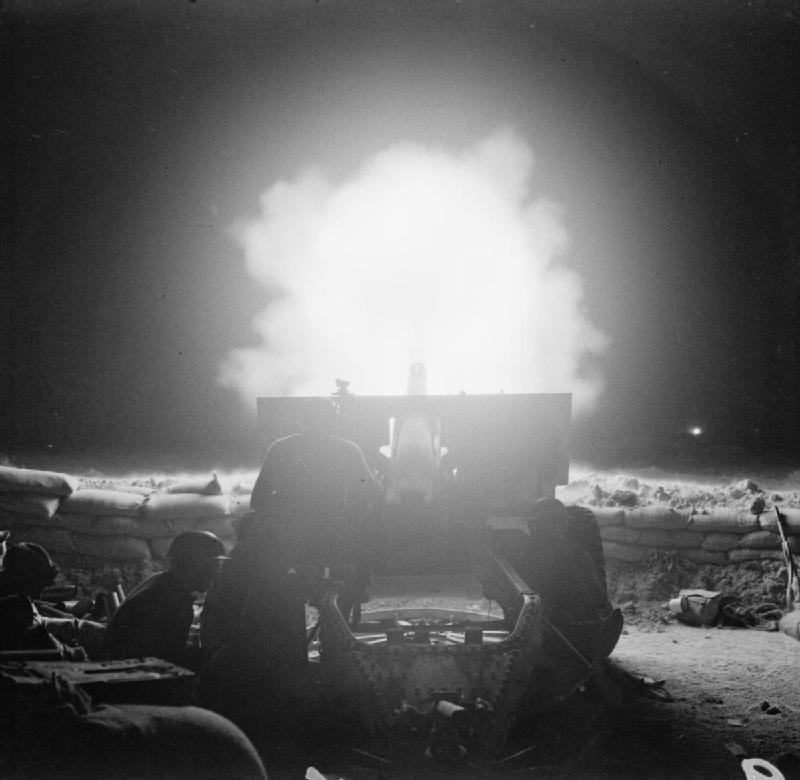
A 25-pounder firing in the British night barrage that launched the Second Battle of El Alamein

==== North Africa ====
51st (Highland) Division's first action was the Second Battle of El Alamein. It moved up during the preceding nights, occupying gun positions and dumping ammunition, and remaining concealed during daylight. For the first time in the Western Desert Campaign, the Eighth Army had enough 25-pounders to allow them to be concentrated and switched from one set-piece target to another. Almost every gun was used to neutralise enemy batteries. The bombardment began at 21.40 on 23 October and lasted for 15 minutes; then after 5 minutes silence the guns opened again on the enemy's forward positions and the infantry began to advance. After a further 7 minutes the guns began firing concentrations at a succession of specific locations. The whole artillery programme lasted for 5 hours 30 minutes. 51st (H) Division ran into several centres of resistance and only on the extreme left did it reach its final objective; however, the 'break-in' phase of the battle had started well.

On the second night of the battle, 51st (H) Division's guns fired a similar succession of CB tasks, concentrations and then a barrage to support 1st Armoured Division's attack. On the night of 25/26 October 51st (H) Division made progress towards its own objective as the 'dog-fight' phase continued. The 'break-out' phase began on the night of 1/2 November with Operation Supercharge, preceded by another powerful barrage. In the early hours of 4 November, 51st (H) Division broke through to the Rahman Track, and the Axis forces began to retreat.

51st (H) Division then took part in the pursuit to El Agheila and Tripoli in January 1943. By 25 February, it was past Medenine in Tunisia and facing the Mareth Line. The Axis force made a spoiling attack on 6 March (the Battle of Medenine) but there was plenty of warning and the advance was easily repulsed. 51st (H) Division had already moved most of its artillery south in waiting for the attack, leaving three Troops to move and fire between various positions to simulate the whole divisional artillery remaining in its old positions.

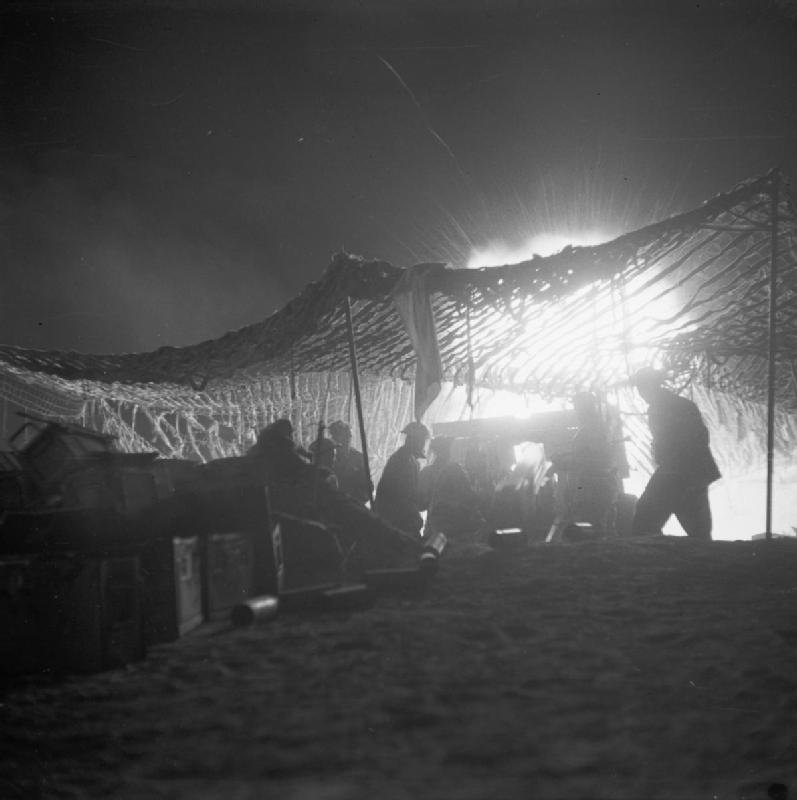
25-pounder gun in action at night during the assault on the Mareth Line.

The Battle of the Mareth Line began on the night of 16/17 March, when 51st (H) Division took the outpost line against negligible opposition. The main attack followed on 20/21 March, with another massive night barrage. But little progress was made over the Wadi Zigzaou for the first two days and the line held until it was outflanked by other forces in the south. The Axis defence collapsed on 28 March and the following day 51st (H) Division was on its way to Gabès.

The next Axis defence line was along Wadi Akarit. The barrage for 51st (H) Division's assault began at 04.15 on 6 April, followed by four more barrages over five hours, one involving a difficult change of direction, and the division's attack, in the words of the Official History, 'went like clockwork'. Axis troops then began counter-attacks and the Highlanders had to fight hard to hold their gains. The pursuit was resumed the following day, through Sfax, after which the divisional artillery was in action in the hill country near Enfidaville. This lasted until the fall of Tunis and the end of the campaign.

==== Sicily ====
128th (H) Field Rgt then rested and trained for the Allied landings in Sicily (Operation Husky). The regiment landed shortly after the assault infantry on 10 July. The division was moving forward by nightfall, with the objectives of Palazzolo Acreide and Vizzini, which it reached by the night of 14/15 July. Despite some fierce fighting the division continued with scarcely a pause towards the Dittaino river.

On 17 July, the division deployed to cross the Dittaino and attempt to capture Paternò. It achieved a bridgehead but further advance was checked, so on the night of 20/21 July the division sent a composite force of infantry and armour against the main enemy defences at Gerbini Airfield. Although the attack succeeded, fierce counter-attacks by the Hermann Goring Division drove the Highlanders out the following morning, after which 51st (H) Division was put onto the defensive.

51st (H) Division's artillery joined in XXX Corps' artillery preparation for operations against Adrano (the battles round Etna). These began on 31 July while 51st (H) took bridgeheads over the Dittaino. Paternò fell on 4 August, Biancavilla on 6 August. The division made a 50 miles (80 km) 'sidestep' on 12 August and the guns came into action north of Zafferana the following night. By now, the Axis forces were evacuating Sicily, which was completed on 17 August.

51st (H) Division did not take part in the subsequent Italian Campaign, having been earmarked for the Allied invasion of Normandy Operation Overlord. However, its guns did assist in the massive bombardment covering the assault crossing of the Strait of Messina on 3 September (Operation Baytown). The division embarked for the UK on 7 November and disembarked at Liverpool on 26 November. It then went into training for Overlord.

==== Normandy ====
51st (Highland) Division was in the first follow-up wave of formations in Overlord. On 2 June 1944 it embarked on Liberty ships at East India Docks, London, and began landing on 7 June (D + 1). The guns went into action supporting the Orne bridgehead. On 23 June, the division expanded the bridgehead by a night attack at Ste Honorine la Chardonnerette. The guns had remained silent before the attack to ensure surprise, after which the enemy's successive attempts to recover the village were stopped by artillery fire. The division supported 3rd Division's attack on the flank of Operation Goodwood. On 8 August, 51st (H) Division spearheaded II Canadian Corps' attack towards Falaise (Operation Totalize), preceded by a massive barrage. The attack began before dawn and by first light the break-in was going well, with a number of villages taken. After a second artillery preparation, the 4th Canadian and 1st Polish Armoured Divisions passed through to continue the advance. The Canadians renewed the advance to Falaise on 14 August in Operation Tractable, with 51st (H) Division attacking towards the Liaison Valley on the left flank. By 21 August, the Falaise Pocket had been closed and the division was advancing eastwards towards Lisieux.

51st (H) Division then moved up to and across the Seine for the assault on Le Havre (Operation Astonia). This was a major operation with a massive field artillery preparation alongside support from medium guns and RAF bombers, which cowed the opposition. It was followed by a similar assault to take Boulogne (Operation Wellhit). The division next made a long move to the Antwerp area at the end of September, then spent three weeks in the line at Sint-Oedenrode.

==== Low Countries ====
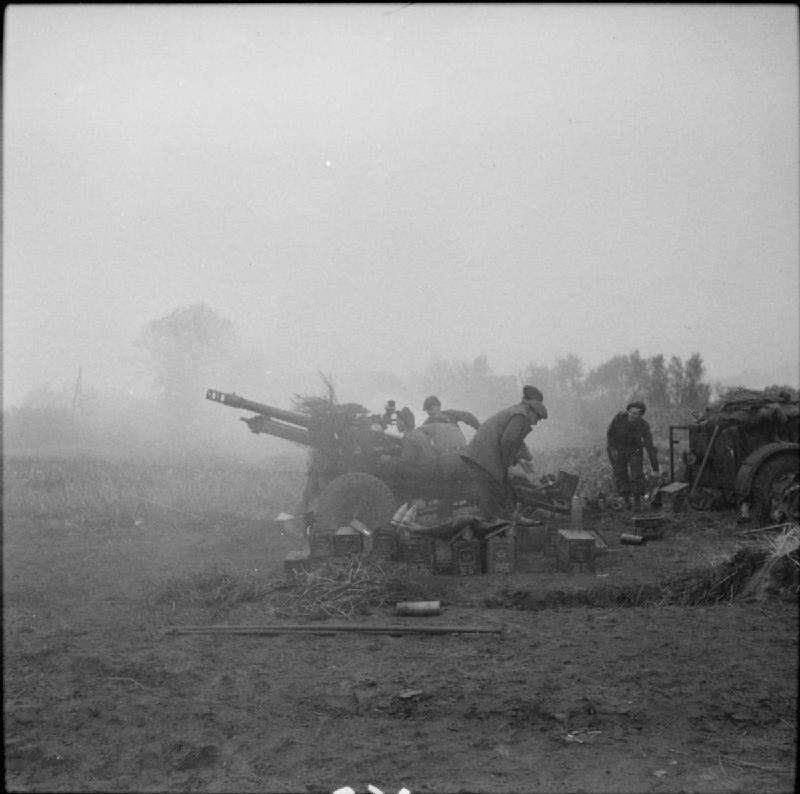
25-pounder firing during the advance on 's-Hertogenbosch on 23 October 1944.

The division's next offensive action was west of 's-Hertogenbosch on the night of 23 October. With massive artillery support the infantry took all their objectives, with follow-up advances over succeeding days through Loon op Zand and across the Afwaterings Canal towards the Meuse (Dutch: Maas) by early November. On 14 November, the division carried out an assault crossing of the Willems Canal near Weert accompanied by another heavy artillery barrage, then moved on to the Zig Canal and crossed that on 17 November with much less preparation.

51st (H) Division was then moved to hold 'The Island', the wet low-lying country between Nijmegen and Arnhem that had been captured during Operation Market Garden (see above). In mid-December, the division was pulled out of the line for rest. In December, the division was suddenly moved south as part of the response to the German breakthrough in the Ardennes (the Battle of the Bulge), and fought its way into the flank of the 'Bulge' in winter conditions.

==== Rhineland ====
Like 3rd Division, 51st (H) Division was engaged in the fighting in the Reichswald (Operation Veritable). It began at 05.00 on 8 February with a huge artillery preparation, after which the Highlanders attacked and were on their objectives by 23.00 that night. Over the next two days, 128th Fd Rgt regiment fired smoke and HE to help the brigade continue the advance through the forest. The slow advance continued through Gennep on 11 February, then German counter-attacks were driven off by DF fire. The final phase of the operation for 51st (H) Division began on 18 February against Goch, which was successfully taken after stiff fighting.

The division took a leading part in the Rhine crossing (Operation Plunder). OP parties from the regiment were among the first troops across the river on the night of 23/24 March, while the guns fired throughout the night just 600 yards (550 m) from the river and under frequent return fire. The division fought its way into Rees, and the guns were brought over two days later. The division then continued through Isselburg and Anholt.

The division reached the Dortmund–Ems Canal on 8 April. After a pause at the canal, it advanced rapidly towards Bremen against delaying actions. It reached Delmenhorst on 20 April and closed in on the centre of Bremen. The German surrender at Lüneburg Heath ended the fighting on 5 May.

128th (Highland) Field Regiment was placed in suspended animation on 4 April 1946 in British Army of the Rhine.

== Postwar ==
When the TA was reconstituted in 1947, 77th Fd Rgt reformed at Greenock as 277th (Highland) Field Regiment, once more in 51st (Highland) Division. On 10 March 1955, the regiment absorbed 254th (West Highland) Anti-Tank Rgt at Dumbarton.

Meanwhile, 128th Field Rgt reformed at Pollokshaws as 328th (Highland) Medium Regiment in 1947, changing its subtitle to 'Lowland' the following year. It reorganised in 1950, with most of the regiment amalgamating into 279th (Lowland) Field Rgt and one battery forming 888th (Renfrewshire) Independent Locating Bty.

Then, on 1 May 1961, 277th Fd Rgt (less R Bty) and 888 Bty both amalgamated with 402nd (Argyll and Sutherland Highlanders) Light Rgt, and R (Clyde) Bty of 357th (Lowland) Light Rgt, to form 277th (Argyll and Sutherland Highlanders) Field Rgt with the following organisation:

- RHQ – ex 277th Rgt
- P (Clyde) Bty – ex R/357th Rgt
- Q Bty – ex 277th Rgt
- R Paisley Bty – ex 402nd Rgt

R Bty of 277th Fd Rgt was amalgamated with 8th Bn Argyll & Sutherland Highlanders, and the surplus personnel of 888 Bty joined 445 (Cameronians) Light Anti-Aircraft Rgt.

When the TA was reduced to the Territorial and Army Volunteer Reserve in 1967, the regiment merged with 278th (Lowland) Field Rgt and 279th (City of Glasgow and Ayr) Field Rgt to form P (Clyde and Renfrewshire, Argyll & Sutherland Highlanders) and R (Paisley, Argyll & Sutherland Highlanders) Batteries of the Lowland Regiment, RA. When the Lowland Regiment was reduced to a cadre in 1969, some of the personnel from R (Paisley, A&SH) Bty joined 102 (Clyde) Field Squadron at Paisley in 71 (Scottish) Engineer Regiment, Royal Engineers.

In 1986, 105 (Scottish) Air Defence Regiment was designated as the successor unit to the Lowland Regiment, RA.

== Uniforms and insignia ==
The original uniform of the Renfrewshire AVCs was a blue tunic with scarlet cord on the cuff, a scarlet collar with black edging, the company number on the shoulder strap, and silver buttons. The trousers were blue with a scarlet stripe, the cap blue with a scarlet band and a grenade or Prince of Wales's feathers for the badge, and the waistbelt black. The buttons carried the Prince of Wales's feathers and coronet above a gun, surrounded by a strap with the words 'RENFREWSHIRE VOLUNTEER ARTILLERY'. The 2nd Dumbarton AVC wore a blue uniform with scarlet facings and white belts. After consolidation the unit wore a standard RA helmet.

When 277th Fd Rgt was amalgamated with 402nd (A&S) Light Rgt, it adopted the Argyll & Sutherland Highlanders' Tam O'Shanter bonnet and cap badge, and the regimental flash of a narrow red and white diced strip with green ends.

== Commanding Officers ==
The commanding officers of the unit included:

- Lt-Col John Scott, CB, VD, 22 August 1863
- Lt-Col William Anderson, VD, 11 June 1892
- Lt-Col Robert Duncan, 13 May 1894
- Lt-Col Francis G. Gemmill, VD, 18 May 1898
- Lt-Col Charles C. Scott, VD, 18 January 1902
- Lt-Col P.C. Macfarlane, 17 May 1913
- Lt-Col D. Paterson, DSO, 1 May 1921
- Brevet Col H.C. Walker, TD, 1 May 1925
- Bt Col G.W. Manuel, TD, 1 May 1930
- Lt-Col M.V. Service, 1 May 1935
- Lt-Col W.H. Denholm, 1939?

== Honorary Colonels ==
The following served as Honorary Colonel of the unit:

- Col J. Reid, appointed 17 June 1905
- Col Charles C. Scott, VD, former CO, appointed 20 September 1913
- Col P.C. Macfarlane, TD, former CO, appointed 18 June 1921
- Col H.C. Walker, TD, appointed 8 July 1931
