= 541st Coast Regiment, Royal Artillery =

541st Coast Regiment, RA
- Cap badge of the Royal Artillery
- Active: 18 October 1941 – 22 June 1945
- Country: United Kingdom
- Branch: British Army
- Role: Coast Artillery
- Size: 4–6 Batteries
- Part of: Orkney & Shetland Defence Force
- Garrison/HQ: Lerwick, Shetland
- Engagements: World War II

541st Heavy Regiment, previously 1st Coast Artillery Group, was a Royal Artillery unit of the British Army stationed in the Shetland Islands during World War II. During the war it defended Lerwick and Sullom Voe. It was disbanded at the end of the war.

== Mobilisation ==
Despite the proliferation of artillery units of the Volunteer Force around the coasts of the United Kingdom in the 19th Century, none was formed in Shetland, the role being fulfilled by the Royal Naval Reserve, who trained gunners at Fort Charlotte in Lerwick. In 1880 the War Office proposed to convert the Lerwick-based Orkney & Shetland Rifle Volunteers into artillery, but this was never carried through. In 1926 it was decided that the responsibility for coast defences in the UK would rest solely with the part-time Territorial Army (TA), but at that date there was no TA presence in Shetland. Only major ports were given permanent gun batteries. Lerwick was defined as a Class C port, to have defences installed after the outbreak of war.

With the threat of invasion after the German invasion of the Low Countries on 10 May 1940, the coastal artillery defending the whole UK was greatly increased. On 22 May the Royal Navy was ordered to install two Coast Defence Emergency Batteries at Lerwick and Sullom Voe. The Lerwick battery consisted of two Mk XI 6-inch guns; the Navy also began supplying 4-inch guns from July: two were installed at Lerwick, two more at Sullom Voe. The Navy agreed to man these batteries for a limited period, after which the Royal Artillery (RA) units were to take over. Searchlights for night engagements were issued to the batteries when they became available.

== 1st Coast Artillery Group ==
Formation sign of OSDEF

The RA immediately began forming Coast Batteries of gunners to take over these positions, and 1st Coast Artillery Group was formed at Lerwick to command them on 18 October 1940:

- 301 Coast Bty – formed 10 June 1940 at Sullom Voe
- 302 Coast Bty – formed 10 June 1940 at Greenhead, Lerwick
- 371 Coast Bty
- 420 Coast Bty – formed 18 October 1940

301 and 302 Batteries exchanged positions on 1 April 1941. (Note: It is suggested by one source that 146 Bty of 535th (Orkney) Coast Rgt, replaced by 222 Bty of the same regiment, may have been stationed at Lerwick at this time.)

While the majority of coast defence units were under the local corps or district HQ, the Orkney & Shetland Defences ('OSDEF') came under the control of Anti-Aircraft Command, which had a strong presence on the islands.

== 541st Coast Regiment ==
On 1 June 1941, 1st Coast Artillery Group was redesignated 541st Special Coast Regiment (the term 'Special' disappeared by May 1942). The men were stationed in remote locations, and in the summer of 1941 the batteries were rotated with batteries from other parts of the UK:

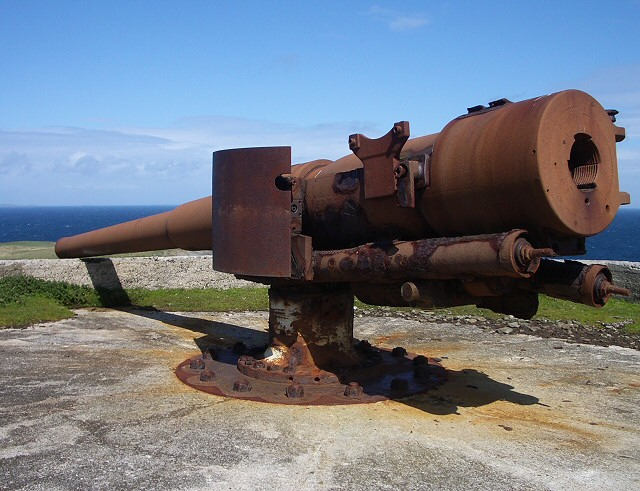
6-inch gun at Aith Ness on Bressay, covering Lerwick

- Regimental Headquarters (RHQ) – Lerwick
- 301 Bty – transferred to 552nd Coast Rgt at Bexhill-on-Sea, East Sussex, 14 August 1941
- 302 Bty – became independent 28 August 1941, later joined 540th Coast Rgt at Dreghorn Barracks, Edinburgh
- 371 Bty – became independent 5 August 1941, later joined 547th Coast Rgt at Dunwich, Suffolk
- 420 Bty – became independent 5 August 1941, to Nodes Point Battery, Isle of Wight, later joined 508th (Tynemouth) Coast Rgt
- 369 Bty – joined from 560th Coast Rgt 12 August 1941
- 385 Bty – joined from 552nd Coast Rgt 9 September 1941
- 404 Bty – independent, formerly 561st Coast Rgt, joined 12 August 1941
- 409 Bty – joined from 547th Coast Rgt 26 August 1941

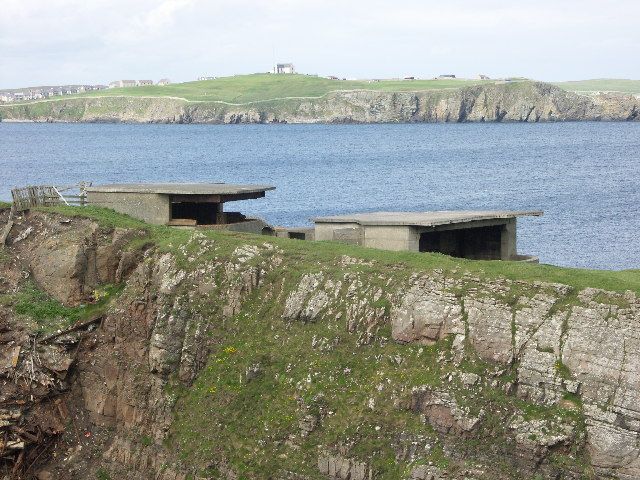
Ness of Sound Battery, Lerwick.

On 12 October 1942 two additional batteries joined the regiment and by 1 November the batteries were deployed as follows:

- 190 Bty – joined from 523rd (Cornwall) Coast Rgt, to North Lerwick (Note: 190 Coast Bty had trained on twin 6-pounder gun mountings, and these or other additional guns may have been installed at North and South Lerwick t this time.)
- 283 Bty – joined from 572nd Coast Rgt, to South Lerwick
- 369 Bty – Ness of Sound
- 385 Bty – Scalloway
- 404 Bty – Greenhead
- 409 Bty – Sullom Voe

By July 1943, No 15 Army Plotting Room had been established at Lerwick to coordinate coastal radar coverage around the islands.

== Disbandment ==
The coast guns on Shetland were never engaged during the war. After VE Day the coastal defences of the UK were stood down. On 1 June 1945 RHQ together with 190, 385, 404 and 409 Btys began to disband; as an established prewar TA unit 283 Bty (originally part of 515th (Suffolk) Coast Rgt) was placed in suspended animation, while 369 Bty transferred to 538th (Clyde) Coast Rgt, which acted as a holding unit for Scottish coast batteries. The dispersal of 541st Coast Rgt was completed by 22 June 1945.

Postwar, 430th (Orkney & Zetland) Coast Rgt of the TA established a presence on Shetland.
