= 1st Fife Artillery Volunteers =

1st Fife Artillery Volunteers Highland (Fifeshire) Heavy Battery 56th (Highland) Medium Regiment 356th (Highland) Medium Regiment
- Active: 1860–1967
- Country: United Kingdom
- Branch: Territorial Army
- Type: Artillery Regiment
- Role: Garrison Artillery (1860–1908); Heavy Artillery (1908–1920); Medium Artillery (1920–1956); Field Engineers (1956–1967)
- Engagements: First World War: Western Front; Second World War: Battle of France; Dunkirk evacuation Normandy

Commanders
- Notable commanders: Sir Sidney Kirkman

The 1st Fife Artillery Volunteers, later the Highland (Fifeshire) Heavy Battery, was a volunteer unit first recruited in Fife, Scotland, in 1860, which fought on the Western Front in the First World War. Its successor units expanded recruitment to Aberdeenshire and again fought in North West Europe, during the Second World War.

== Volunteer Force (1859–1908) ==
The Volunteer Force came into existence in 1859 as a result of an invasion scare, and the subsequent enthusiasm for joining local Rifle, Artillery and Engineer Volunteer Corps. By 1860, there were 11 Artillery Volunteer Corps (AVCs) in Fifeshire, mainly in coastal towns:

- 1st (Tayport) Fife Artillery Volunteers, formed at Ferryport on Craig, 26 January 1860
- 2nd (Newport) Fife Artillery Volunteers, formed at Newport-on-Tay, 13 April 1860
- 3rd (St Andrews) Fife Artillery Volunteers, formed on 6 March 1860
- 4th (Inverkeithing) Fife Artillery Volunteers, formed on 3 March 1860
- 5th (Kirkcaldy) Fife Artillery Volunteers, formed on 22 March 1860
- 6th (Burntisland) Fife Artillery Volunteers, formed on 20 February 1860
- 7th (Anstruther) Fife Artillery Volunteers, formed at Elie on 8 March 1860
- 8th (Leven) Fife Artillery Volunteers, formed two batteries on 24 July 1860
- 9th (Dysart) Fife Artillery Volunteers, formed on 19 September 1860
- 10th (Wemyss) Fife Artillery Volunteers, formed out of the overflow of the 8th on 16 January 1862.
- 11th (Kinghorn) Fife Artillery Volunteers, formed on 30 April 1863

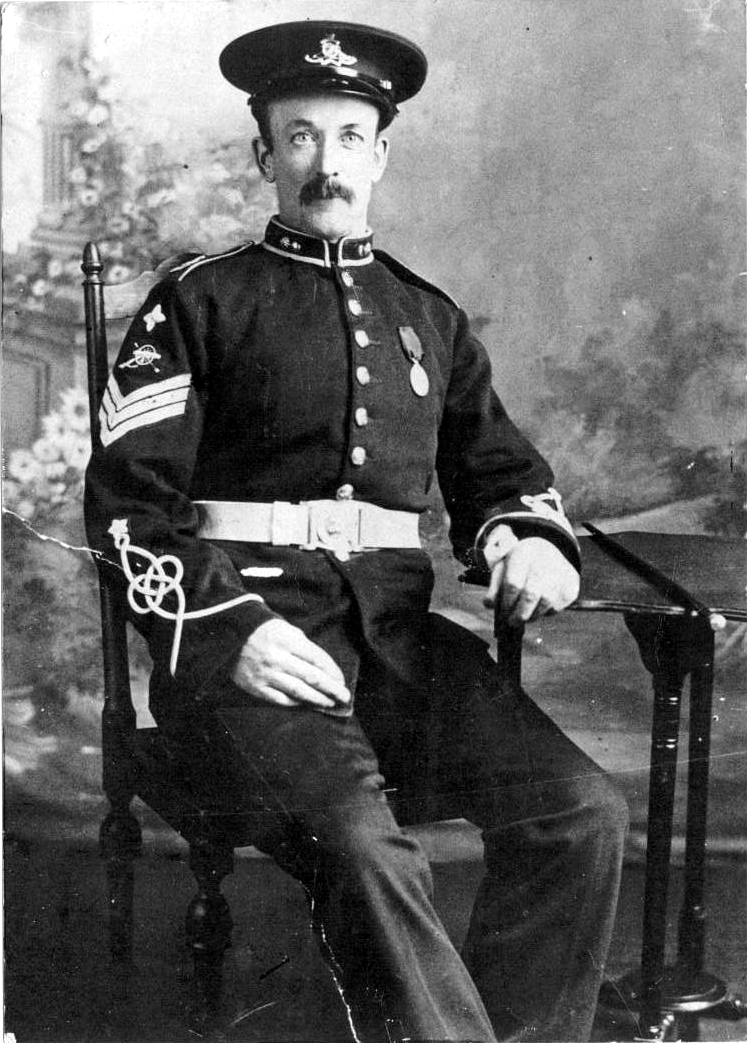
Sgt Andrew Foster of Dysart Fife in full dress uniform, c1905

Together, these units comprised the 1st Fifeshire Administrative Brigade based in St Andrews under the command of Lt-Col W.H.M. Dougall, a Royal Navy officer. The administrative brigade also included the 1st and 2nd Stirlingshire AVCs at Grangemouth and Stirling respectively. It retained its organisation of 13 corps (later companies) throughout the 19th century. They were not connected with the Fife Artillery, which was a Militia regiment based in Cupar.

Despite the ban on Volunteer involvement in politics, the band of the 5th Fife Artillery Volunteers illegally took part in a trade union demonstration in July 1873. This was a recurrent problem with the Volunteer bands, which were only nominally under military control.

At the time of the Childers Reforms in 1881, the Administrative Brigade was consolidated as the 1st Fifeshire Artillery Volunteers, covering Fifeshire and Stirlingshire, ranked 18th in the order of precedence of Artillery Volunteers. In 1882, all the artillery volunteers were attached to one of the territorial garrison divisions of the Royal Artillery (RA), and the unit it was included in the Scottish Division. When the Scottish Division was disbanded in 1889, the unit was transferred to the Southern Division.

In 1889, a position battery of 16-Pounder Rifled Muzzle Loading (RML) guns was issued to the Corps and manned by 3rd Battery. In 1892, this became the 1st Position Battery, with the 1st (Tayport) Company becoming the 2nd Position Battery, whilst the 2nd Company became the 3rd Position Battery.

In 1900, a new 14th Company was formed at Kirkaldy.

In 1899, the Artillery Volunteers were attached to the Royal Garrison Artillery (RGA),. When the divisional structure was abolished, the unit was redesignated the 1st Fifeshire RGA (Volunteers) on 1 January 1902. There was also an affiliated Cadet Corps at Kirkcaldy High School.

== Territorial Force ==
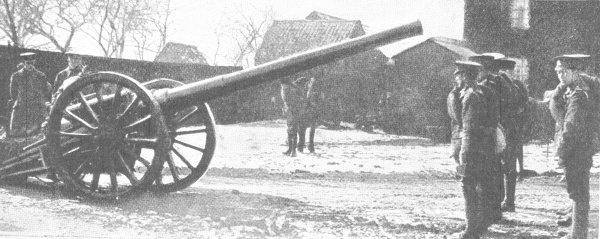
4.7-inch gun on 'Woolwich' carriage, ca 1914.

When the Volunteers were subsumed into the new Territorial Force in 1908 under the Haldane Reforms, the 1st Fifeshire RGA (V) (except No 7 Company) was split between three units: the Highland (Fifeshire) RGA, the Fifeshire Battery of the II Highland Brigade, Royal Field Artillery at Leven, and (together with the 1st Forfarshire RGA (V)) the North Scottish RGA, later renamed the Forth RGA, a 'defended ports' unit based at Edinburgh.

The Highland (Fifeshire) RGA consisted of a heavy battery equipped with 4.7-inch guns and an ammunition column, based at Kirkcaldy, later at the Drill Hall, Elgin Street, Dunfermline, and was assigned to the Highland Division of the TF. From 1908 until the outbreak of war in August 1914, it was commanded by Major Lord Bruce, son of the Honorary Colonel of the 1st Fife RGA, the 9th Earl of Elgin and Kincardine (and himself later 10th Earl of Elgin and Kincardine).

== World War I ==
=== 1/1st Highland (Fifeshire) Battery ===
The Highland (Fifeshire) Heavy Battery mobilised at Dunfermline and joined the Highland Division, which was concentrating around Bedford as part of First Army of Central Force. Having separated 'Home Service' men, who remained at the depots forming 2nd Line units with the recruits who were coming in, the division's 1st Line units (now distinguished by the prefix '1/') undertook training for overseas service. The Highland Division was later designated 51st (Highland) Division.

==== Aubers Ridge ====
1/1st Highland Battery went to France with the Highland Division, to join the British Expeditionary Force (BEF) on the Western Front, landing on 4 May 1915. However, artillery policy in the BEF was to withdraw heavy batteries from the divisions and group them into dedicated heavy artillery formations, so the battery was immediately posted to II Group, Heavy Artillery Reserve for the Battle of Aubers Ridge. II Heavy Artillery Reserve consisted of a variety of heavy and siege batteries whose role was to support the assault of IV Corps by demolishing strongpoints and farms that were beyond the range of divisional field guns, and for counter-battery (CB) fire in the Ligny le Grand–Aubers–Fromelles sector. The group was provided with Royal Flying Corps reconnaissance aircraft fitted with wireless to assist observation in the flat country. The bombardment began at 05.00 on 9 May, and soon reports came in that many of the shells were falling short of their targets. This was due to faulty ammunition and wear and tear on the old 4.7-inch gun barrels. In many cases, the copper driving bands stripped off the shells as they left the barrels, resulting in the shell turning end over end and landing anywhere, even deep in the British support positions. In spite of the CB fire, German guns were able to open up on the British trenches, which were soon packed with wounded men from the first attacking wave, and support troops waiting to follow up. A second attempt to attack in the afternoon was hampered by the shortage of artillery ammunition to repeat the bombardment.

The battery had been assigned to III Heavy Artillery Brigade on arrival in France, now it was moved to IV Heavy Bde on 3 July and VIII Heavy Bde on 20 August, before being attached to 5th Divisional Artillery from 4 September to 6 November. It then rejoined VIII Heavy Bde.

==== Somme ====
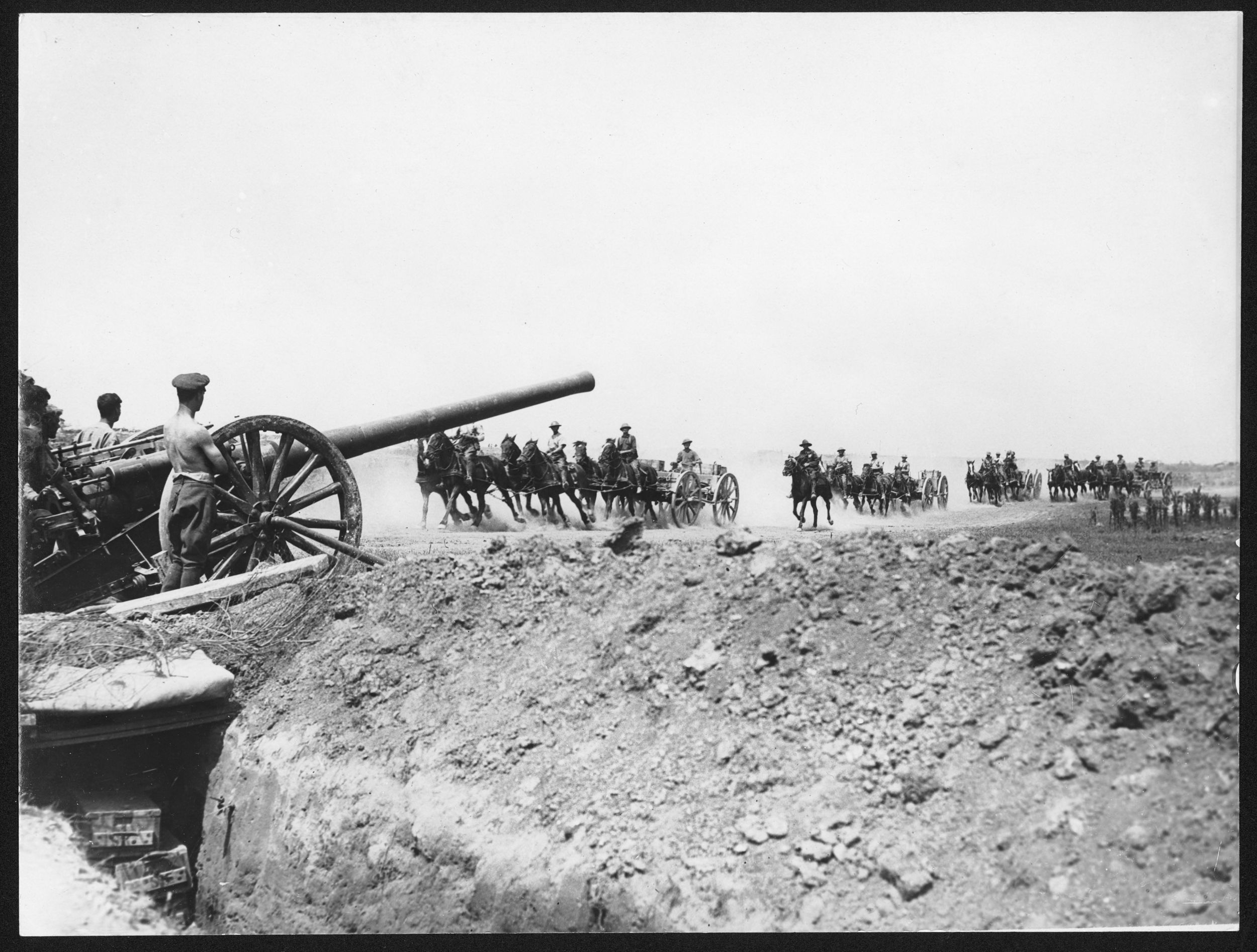
4.7-inch gun on the Somme, 1916.

In April 1916, the heavy artillery brigades were renamed heavy artillery groups (HAGs), and the battery moved to 1st HAG on 14 June. 1st HAG was with Fourth Army preparing for that year's 'Big Push' (the Battle of the Somme. During the battle, the battery transferred to the 16th HAG on 7 July and on 27 July to 17th HAG, which came under Reserve Army for the latter stages. After the Somme fighting ended, 1/1st Highland Hvy Bty moved to 32nd HAG on 2 December.

==== Reorganisation ====
On 10 December 1916, the battery was withdrawn from the line to rest and refit, replacing its 4.7-inch guns with 60-pounders. On 23 January 1917, it was joined by a section from 201st Heavy Battery, (Note: 201st Heavy Bty had been formed at Woolwich on 24 June 1916; its other sections were posted to 1/1st Lowland and 151st (Darlington) Hvy Btys.) making it up to six guns. It then returned to action on 29 January. It moved to 56th HAG on 19 February 1917 and 4th HAG on 14 March (both with Reserve Army, now renamed Fifth Army) and then transferred to XVII Corps in Third Army with 7th HAG on 21 March. This corps was preparing for the Battle of Arras.

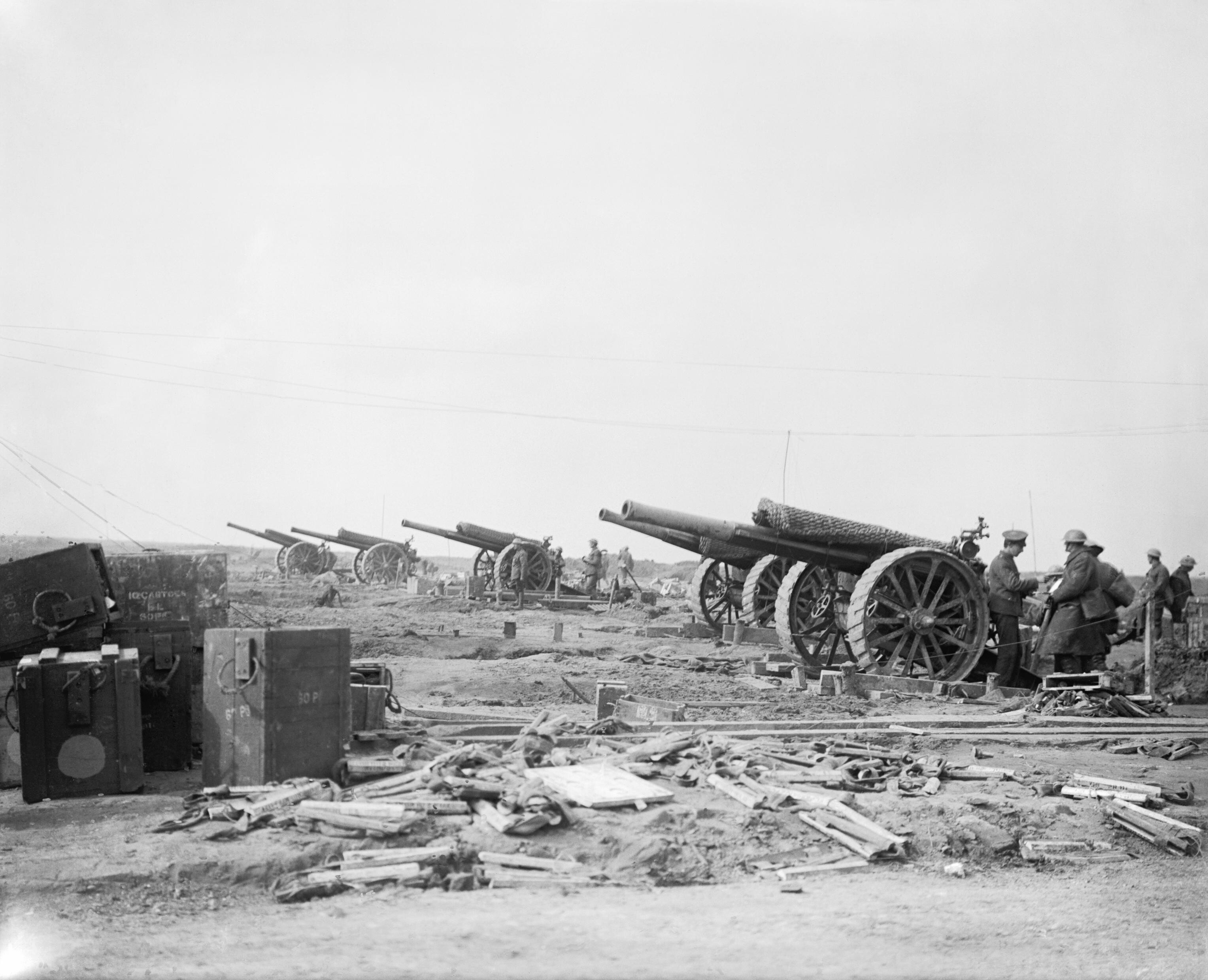
A battery of 60-pounders deployed during the Battle of Arras, 1917.

==== Arras ====
There were many more guns available for this attack and the artillery plan was much more carefully worked out than previous operations. It began with systematic CB work to put the German artillery out of action. Then, at Zero hour, howitzers laid a standing barrage on the German trenches while the 60-pounders swept and searched in depth to catch machine gunners and moving infantry. As the attacking infantry reached their second objective (the Blue Line), their field guns moved up in support and the 60-pounder batteries moved forward into the vacated positions. On XVII Corps' front, the attack was a great success, the 60-pounders laying a standing barrage on the distant final objective until the infantry reached it. However, the follow-up over succeeding days was less successful, the guns having to be moved forward through mud and destruction, and the later bombardments were rushed and less effective. Fighting on the Arras front dragged on into May.

==== Flanders ====
1/1st Highland Hvy Bty moved to 48th HAG on 16 May 1917, to 3rd HAG on 29 May, to 73rd on 26 June, and then to 28th HAG in Fourth Army on 7 July. Fourth Army was at the time stationed on the Flanders coast awaiting a breakthrough at Ypres that never came. Eventually, the battery was transferred on 11 September to 35th HAG with Second Army, which was taking over the direction of the faltering offensive. The Battles of the Menin Road, Polygon Wood and Broodseinde were highly successful because of the weight of artillery brought to bear on German positions. But as the offensive continued with the Battle of Poelcappelle and First and Second Battles of Passchendaele, the tables were turned: British batteries were clearly observable from the Passchendaele Ridge and were subjected to CB fire, while their own guns sank into the mud and became difficult to aim and fire. 1/1st Highland Hvy Bty had been moved to 28th HAG on 17 October then, on 27 October, as the fighting at Passchendaele ground on, it was transferred away to 83rd HAG at Écurie, near Arras, in the quiet sector of First Army's front.

In the winter of 1917–18, the HAGs were reorganised as permanent brigades. 83rd HAG became 83rd Brigade, RGA, on 1 January 1918, defined as a 'Mixed' brigade, with 60-pdrs and various calibres of howitzers, assigned to CB duties under XIII Corps. 1/1st Highland Heavy Bty served with 83rd Bde until the end of the war.

==== Spring Offensive ====
The Allies were expecting the Germans to launch their Spring offensive shortly. 83rd Brigade's forward gun positions on Vimy Ridge, including 1/1st Highland Bty's two-gun 'C' position at Willerval, were prepared for all-round defence. During February and March, the gun positions and the nearby village of Bailleul were regularly shelled with high explosive and Mustard gas. First Army was not affected by the first phase of the German Spring offensive (Operation Michael), but came under attack in the second phase (Operation Mars) beginning on 28 March. Just before the attack, 83rd Bde had pulled its most forward batteries back behind the ridge, avoiding much of the German bombardment when it opened at 03.00. The British heavy artillery replied with devastating CB fire, but 1/1st Highland Bty's two guns on Vimy Ridge were soon put out of action, one with a split trail, the other with its sight bracket shot off; the gunners joined other batteries to keep up the defensive fire. Once the attack began, much of the brigade's fire was at short range in support of 56th (1/1st London) Division and directed by that division's observation posts, the two-gun rear section of 1/1st Highland Bty firing around 500 rounds. Several times the heavy guns caught massed German troops advancing in the open. Although its casualties were heavy, and it had to fall back to the Bailleul–Willerval 'Red Line', 56th Division managed to hold the German attack. German casualties had been so heavy that they only made a few tentative advances in the afternoon, and did not renew the attack on the following days. At midnight, on 29 March, XIII Corps was relieved by Canadian Corps whose fresh troops took over the line. 1/1st Highland Bty had suffered one man killed and eight wounded during the action.

The brigade returned to routine harassing fire and aeroplane shoots during April, with 1/1st Highland Bty's remaining two guns grouped with two from 116th Hvy Bty as a composite battery known as '60-pdr R'. By 15 April, 1/1st Highland Bty was back up to four guns, and was temporarily controlled by 50th Bde, RGA, under Canadian Corps. The corps' front was not involved in the Battle of the Lys in April, when the third German offensive (Operation Georgette) failed to break through in the Ypres sector. Routine firing continued through the summer months, with XVII Corps and Canadian Corps alternating in command of the Vimy front. On 18 July, 83rd Bde was ordered to go into GHQ Reserve under VIII Corps. The batteries pulled out by sections and marched to the Gouy-Servins area, where the 60-pdr batteries underwent training and tactical exercises in open warfare.

==== The Hundred Days ====
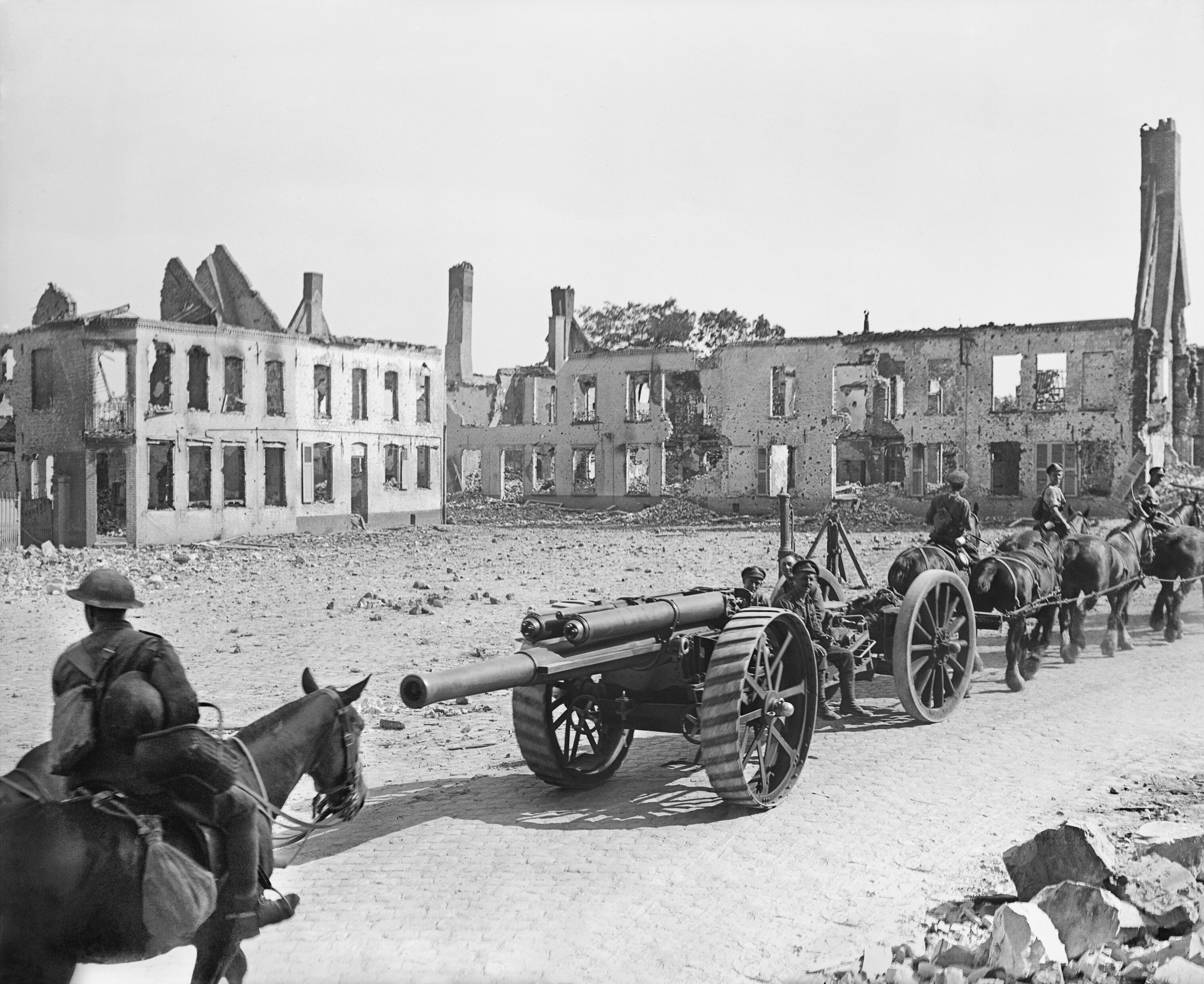
A 60-pounder moving up during the Hundred Days Offensive, 1918.

On 1 August, the heavy batteries marched from Servins while the rest of the brigade entrained. By 7 August, 83rd Bde had moved into positions at Gentelles Wood in the Somme sector under Fourth Army with which it served during the triumphal advance of the Hundred Days Offensive of 1918.

Fourth Army launched the offensive at 04.20 on 8 August, at the Battle of Amiens, with all the guns of 83rd Bde supporting Canadian Corps with a prearranged programme of barrage, harassing and concentration fire, fired without any prior registration. The attack was so successful that by 10.50 the enemy were completely out of range, even for the 60-pdrs, after which the brigade was kept in reserve. Next day, the brigade advanced to Beaucourt and at 13.35 the 60-pdrs came into action (in front of the field artillery) to support an attack at 14.00. On 10 August, 31st Division took over the front and 83rd Bde moved up close behind on the Warvillers–Folies road, and commenced night harassing fire as the front settled down.

On 21 August, the XXXI French Corps took over the sector with 83rd Bde attached to it, supporting its capture of Fresnoy on 26 August. By the end of the month, the brigade's 60-pdr batteries were being pushed forward alongside the French 75mm field guns at the least sign of German withdrawal. On 7 September, the brigade moved to Renancourt near Amiens and two days later reverted to British command in GHQ Reserve.

On 14 September, 83rd Bde came under Fourth Army once more, and marched to St Quentin Wood, arriving on 17 September. Next day, it took part in the Battle of Épehy, beginning at 05.20. In the afternoon, a German counter-attack was crushed by the massed British artillery. Over the next few days, the guns carried out HF and CB tasks, particularly against the strongpoint known as the Quadrilateral, though they also received a good deal of enemy shellfire, especially on 21–23 September when 1/1st Highland Bty lost 2 other ranks killed and 9 wounded. On 27 September, the 60-pdr carried out a heavy programme of harassing fire on enemy road junctions, railways and HQs as Fourth Army had closed up to the Hindenburg Line. On 29 September, IX Corps carried out an assault crossing of the St Quentin Canal, with 83rd Bde amongst the mass of artillery supporting the operation. The canal defences had largely been destroyed by the heavy guns, which continued firing on the canal banks until the last possible moment as 137th (Staffordshire) Brigade of 46th (North Midland) Division stormed the outpost line and then scrambled across the canal in the morning mist. The objectives were taken by 15.30; and 83rd Bde was moved forward to fresh positions along the canal that day and the following day. From now on the lighter guns of the brigade, including 1/1st Highland Bty, were affiliated directly to 46th (NM) Division for the advance.

By 3 October, the brigade was supporting IX Corps' attack on the Beaurevoir Line, bombarding Sequehart, Ramicourt, Montbrehain and other commanding features. Fourth Army then pursued the Germans to the River Selle, the 60-pdrs and lighter howitzers keeping up with the advance and coming into action as required. From 11 to 17 October, Fourth Army prepared for another set-piece attack with vigorous HF and CB work, 83rd Bde among the mass of artillery supporting IX Corps. The successful assault of 17 October (the Battle of the Selle) was followed by another on 23 October: a moonlight attack with 83rd Bde supporting 1st Division. As the regimental historian wrote:

"The guns of Fourth Army demonstrated, on 23rd October, the crushing effect of well co-ordinated, massed artillery. They simply swept away the opposition and, though stiff fighting was reported in places, it was not on a large scale".

By now, 83rd Bde had left its heavier howitzers behind, and on 27 October the 60-pdr batteries left their guns under guard and the gunners went back to Bohain for rest. They returned to the line with the rest of the brigade on 4 November when Fourth Army crossed the Sambre Canal (the Battle of the Sambre) with massive fire support. Next day, 46th (NM) Division pushed on, and the 60-pdr batteries crossed the canal with four guns each on 6 November, with 1/1st Highland Bty coming in to action at midday. During the night, it carried out harassing fire at extreme range, and this continued as the advance became a pursuit, all, the heavier guns having been left behind. On 10 November, the guns remained in readiness until the Armistice with Germany came into force on the following day.

After the Armistice, 83rd Bde was selected to be part of the Army of Occupation in Germany. In December, it marched towards the frontier but went into winter quarters near Andenne in Belgium. Demobilisation began in January 1919.

=== 2/1st Highland (Fifeshire) Battery ===
Shortly after the outbreak of war, on 31 August 1914, the TF was authorised to raise 2nd Line units from those men who had not volunteered for, or were not fit for, overseas service, together with new volunteers, while the 1st Line went overseas to supplement the Regulars. The role of the 2nd Line was Home Defence and training drafts for the army on active service. 2/1st Highland (Fifeshire) Heavy Bty RGA was raised at Dunfermline for service with the 64th (2nd Highland) Division. In January 1916, the division was attached to the Eighth New Army and moved to Norfolk. In September 1916, the battery left 64th Division and was attached to the 3rd Provisional Brigade at Sheringham, which became 223rd Mixed Brigade in December 1916. The battery retained its obsolete 4.7-inch guns and remained with this brigade until the end of the war.

== Interwar ==
When the TF was reformed on 7 February 1920, the battery was reconstituted as the 1st (Highland) Medium Brigade, RGA, with the headquarters now at Aberdeen. As well as men from the former Highland (Fifeshire) Battery, personnel were drawn from six companies of the 6th (Banff and Donside) and four companies of 7th (Deeside) Battalions of the Gordon Highlanders to bring it up to a strength of four batteries. It was renumbered as the 5th (Highland) Medium Brigade in 1921 when the TF was reorganised as the Territorial Army (TA). In 1924, the RGA was absorbed into the RA. The brigade was classed as 'Army Troops' within 51st (Highland) Divisional Area. By 1927, the unit's organisation was as follows:
56th (Highland) Medium Brigade, RA (TA)

- HQ at Aberdeen
- 221st (Peterhead) Medium Battery (Howitzers) – ex 7th Gordons
- 222nd (Fraserburgh) Medium Battery (Howitzers) – ex 7th Gordons
- 223rd (Banffshire) Medium Battery (Howitzers) – ex 6th Gordons
- 224th (Fife) Medium Battery – ex Highland Bty

On 1 February 1938, the Dunfermline-based 224th (Fife) Bty was transferred to provide the basis for a new 71st (Forth) Anti-Aircraft Regiment, RA. It was replaced by 174th Bty, transferred from the North Scottish Heavy Brigade (formerly the North Scottish RGA), a coast defence unit that included part of 1st Fifeshire RGA when it was reorganised in 1908 (see above). On 1 November 1938, the RA renamed its brigades as regiments. Thus, by 1939, the unit's organisation was:
56th (Highland) Medium Regiment, RA (TA)

- HQ at Drill Hall, 43 Skene Terrace, Aberdeen
- 174th (North Scottish) Battery at Fonthill Barracks, Aberdeen
- 221st (Peterhead) Battery at Peterhead
- 222nd (Fraserburgh) Battery (H) at Drill Hall, Fraserburgh
- 223rd (Banffshire) Battery (H) at Banff

After the Munich Crisis, the TA was doubled in size and just before the outbreak of war in September 1939, the regiment was split into two: 56th Medium Regiment retained 174 and 221 Btys; the new 65th Medium Regiment based in Banff had 222 and 223 Btys. Both regiments formed part of the Highland Area of Scottish Command.

== World War II ==
=== 56th (Highland) Medium Regiment ===
The regiment went to France with the British Expeditionary Force in October 1939 as part of III Corps.

When the Battle of France began on 10 May 1940, the regiment accompanied the BEF's advance into Belgium, and then its retirement to defend the Escaut line. German breakthroughs elsewhere forced the BEF to retreat to Dunkirk, where the artillery had to destroy its guns and await evacuation (Operation Dynamo).

After the evacuation from Dunkirk, the regiment became part of Eastern Command of Home Forces in June 1940. It was sent, with whatever guns could be obtained, to assist in the defence of Essex, where it came under the Commander Royal Artillery (CRA) of 15th (Scottish) Division. According to the divisional historian:

'The guns had the stupendous task of covering from static positions the whole forty miles of the Divisional front from Southend along the Essex coast to Harwich. And what guns! The field regiments averaged eight museum pieces per regiment ... The pride of the C.R.A.'s flock was the 56th Medium Regiment, which he superimposed over the whole front. Its armament showed a pleasing variety, consisting of four 6-inch howitzers, six 6-inch mortars, two 4.7-inch Q.F. naval guns, two 4-inch B.L. naval guns, one 75m (French) gun taken off a ship, two 12-pounders on fixed mountings, and four 6-pounders. The rumour that Mons Meg was on her way south to join the party proved unfounded'.

The Essex coastal defences were stood down in 1941 and the units returned to training. 56th Medium Regiment never saw active service again. In January 1943, it was reorganised as a reserve or holding regiment, being joined between 1 and 11 January by 139 and 140 Field Btys from 167th Field Rgt and 95 and 96 Medium Btys from 71st Medium Rgt (both of which were being disbanded), and by 7 and 10 Heavy Btys from 53rd Heavy Rgt. It then joined 76th Infantry (Reserve) Division on 25 January 1943. The attached field and heavy batteries were transferred to 60th Heavy Rgt on 20 July, but 7 Hvy Bty returned on 22 October. 95 Medium Bty was disbanded on 10 November 1943. The regiment remained with 76th Division until 1 September 1944, when the division was disbanded, when it joined 47th Infantry (Reserve) Division until the end of the war.

As the war in Europe was ending in early 1945, the regiment underwent further reorganisation: on 15 February, 7 Hvy Bty joined a newly formed 171st Heavy Rgt, and new 95 and 122 Medium Btys were formed on 12 May while the regiment was headquartered at the Colne House Hotel in Cromer, Norfolk. On 25 March 1946, 56th (Highland) Medium Regiment with 95, 96, 122, 174 and 221 Medium Batteries began entering suspended animation at RAF Bodney, Norfolk, the process being completed on 17 May.

=== 65th (Highland) Medium Regiment ===
When the regiment mobilised in September 1939, its 6-inch howitzers apparently still had wooden wheels from its horse-drawn days. It too joined the BEF, arriving in April 1940 and coming directly under General Headquarters (GHQ). It also lost its guns in France and became part of Northern Command in Home Forces after the evacuation from Dunkirk. The regiment was authorised to use its parent unit's 'Highland' subtitle on 17 February 1942.

In May 1944, the regiment joined Second Army preparing for Operation Overlord and went to Normandy as part of 4th Army Group Royal Artillery. The regiment landed on 8 June and proceeded to Colleville-sur-Orne, where it initially gave fire support to 1st Special Service Brigade, 6th Airborne and 51st Highland Divisions.

The regiment (less one battery) was in 4th AGRA on 8 February 1945 supporting XXX Corps for the opening of Operation Veritable to clear the Reichswald.

The regiment continued to serve in North West Europe until the end of the war.

65th Medium Regiment was placed in suspended animation on 4 February 1946.

== Postwar ==
When the TA was reconstituted on 1 January 1947, 56th Regiment was reformed as 356 (Highland) Medium Regiment, RA, and 65th Regiment was formally disbanded. 356 Regiment initially forming part of 84 (Field) Army Group Royal Artillery, though that group was disbanded in 1950. On 31 October 1956, it was converted into 278th (Buchan & Banff Artillery) Field Squadron, Royal Engineers, as part of 117 Field Engineer Regiment. In 1961, the squadron was assigned to 51sth (Highland) Division/District RE, but was disbanded in 1967.

== Honorary Colonels ==
The following served as Honorary Colonel of the 1st Fife Artillery and its successors:

- W.H.M. Dougall, RN, commanding officer from 1860, appointed 7 December 1872
- S. Grace, VD, appointed 12 July 1890
- 9th Earl of Elgin and Kincardine, KG, GCSI, GCIE, appointed 26 March 1902
- Col A.W. McPherson, appointed (to 56th (Highland) Medium Regiment) 7 May 1935
