= Clyde Royal Garrison Artillery =

Former Scottish coast defence units of the British Army

Clyde Royal Garrison Artillery 538th (Clyde) Coast Regiment, RA 416th (Clyde) Coast Regiment, RA
- Cap Badge of the Royal Regiment of Artillery
- Active: 1910–1967
- Country: United Kingdom
- Branch: Territorial Force
- Role: Coast Artillery
- Part of: Royal Garrison Artillery
- Garrison/HQ: Port Glasgow

Commanders
- Notable commanders: Sir James Lithgow, 1st Baronet, CBE, MC, TD

The Clyde Royal Garrison Artillery and its successors were Scottish part-time coast defence units of the British Army from 1910 to 1967. Although they unit saw no active service, they supplied trained gunners to siege batteries engaged on the Western Front during World War I.

== Origin ==
When the Territorial Force (TF) was created from the old Volunteer Force under the Haldane Reforms of 1908, a new 'defended ports' unit of the Royal Garrison Artillery (RGA) of eight companies was formed from the Dunbartonshire companies of the 1st Renfrew and Dumbarton RGA (Volunteers), part of the 1st Argyll and Bute RGA (Volunteers), and personnel from the 1st Edinburgh City RGA (Volunteers). The new unit was named the Forth & Clyde RGA, but in 1910 it was split up, the Clyde elements being detached as an independent unit while the remainder became the Forth RGA with its headquarters (HQ) at Edinburgh.

The Clyde RGA had the following organisation:

- HQ at 2 King Street, Port Glasgow
- No 1 Company at Port Glasgow
- No 2 Company at Helensburgh
- No 3 Company at Dumbarton

In 1914, the Clyde defences included four 6-inch guns and four 4.7-inch guns.

== World War I ==
=== Mobilisation ===
On the outbreak of war, the Clyde RGA mobilised in Scottish Coast Defences under the command of Major J. Rogerson, TD, while No 1 Company was commanded by Captain James Lithgow of the Port Glasgow shipbuilding firm Lithgows, who had been commissioned into the Renfrew and Dumbarton RGA in 1902. Shortly afterwards TF units were invited to volunteer for Overseas Service and on 15 August 1914, the War Office (WO) issued instructions to separate those men who had signed up for Home Service only, and form these into reserve units. On 31 August, the formation of a reserve or 2nd Line unit was authorised for each 1st Line unit where 60 per cent or more of the men had volunteered for Overseas Service. The titles of these 2nd Line units would be the same as the original, but distinguished by a '2/' prefix. In this way duplicate companies and batteries were created, releasing the 1st Line units to be sent overseas.

By October 1914, the campaign on the Western Front was bogging down into Trench warfare and there was an urgent need for batteries of Siege artillery to be sent to France. The WO decided that the TF coastal gunners were well enough trained to take over many of the duties in the coastal defences, releasing Regular RGA gunners for service in the field, and 1st line RGA companies that had volunteered for overseas service had been authorised to increase their strength by 50 per cent.

Although complete defended ports units never left the UK, they did supply drafts of trained gunners to RGA units serving overseas. They also provided cadres as the basis on which to form complete new units for front line service. The cadre of the 110th Siege Battery formed in 1916 was provided by the Clyde RGA, while a number of other siege batteries formed later in the Clyde Defences (150th, 191st, 221st, 278th, 286th) may have included trained men from the unit among the recruits, although the Army Council Instructions did not specifically order this.

Under Army Council Instruction 686 of April 1917, the coastal defence companies of the RGA (TF) were reorganised. The Clyde RGA serving in the Clyde garrison was reduced from five companies (1/2nd, 1/3rd, 2/1st, 2/2nd and 2/3rd) to just three (numbered 1–3), which were to be kept up to strength with Regular recruits. Later, they were absorbed into No 23 Coastal Fire Command at Gourock. In April 1918, the Clyde Garrison comprised the following administrative batteries under the control of No 23 Fire Command:

- Cloch Point Battery – 2 × 6-inch Mk VII guns
- Ardhallow Battery – 2 × 6-inch Mk VII
- Porthill Battery – 2 × 4.7-inch QF guns
- Ardeer (Nobel's Explosive Factory)
  - Battery 1 – 1 × 6-inch QF gun
  - Battery 2 – 2 × 12-pdr QF guns

These defences never saw action during the war.

=== 110th Siege Battery, RGA ===
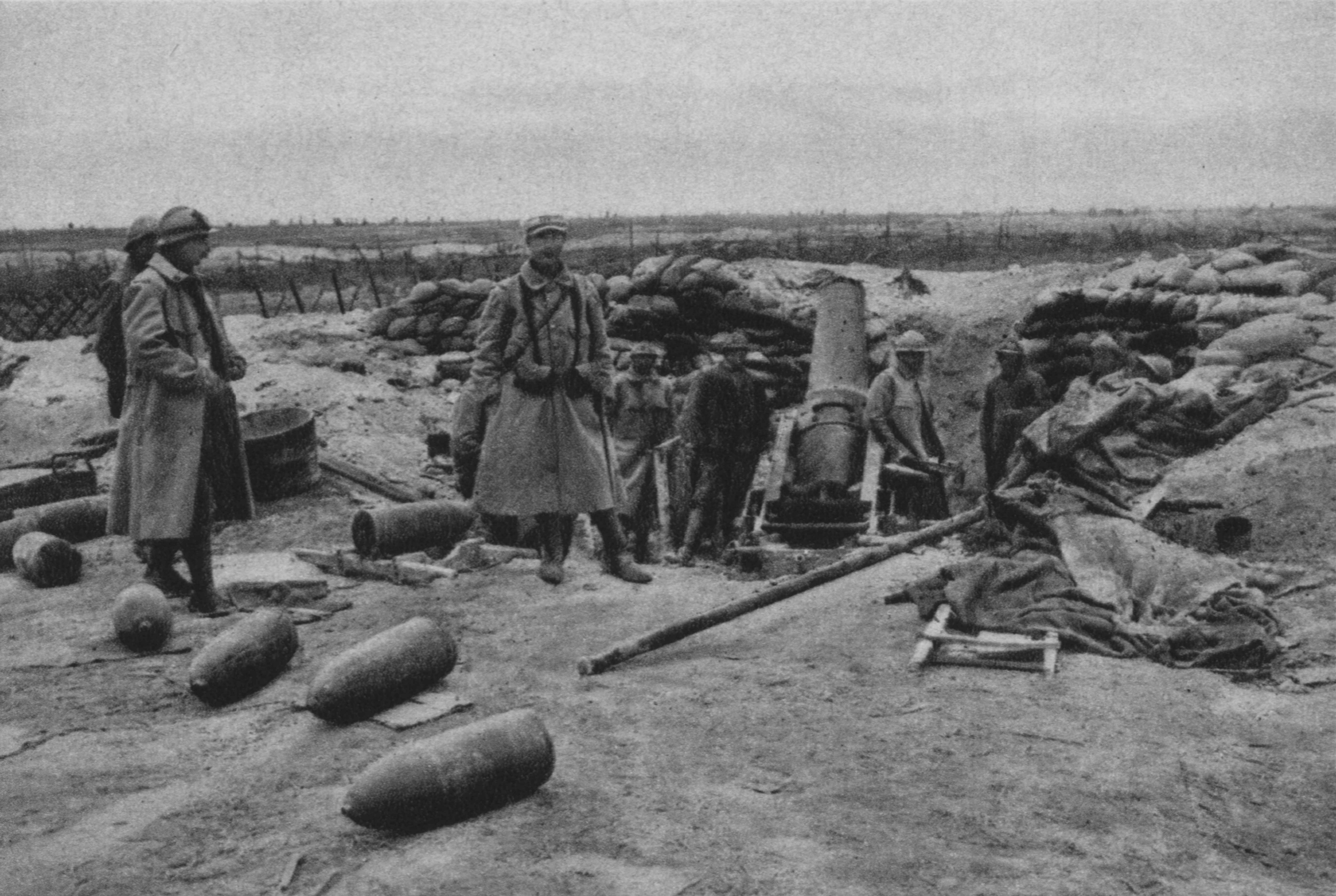
220 mm Heavy mortar in action with the French Army.

110th Siege Battery was formed at Sheerness under Army Council Instruction 397 of 21 February 1916 from a cadre of three officers and 93 other ranks supplied by the Clyde RGA (almost certainly 1/1st Company), together with men drawn from the Thames and Medway Defences. The personnel of the battery went out to the Western Front in May 1916 where they took over four old French 220mm 'Mortiers' – 1880 model heavy mortars employed as siege artillery. By the end of July the old mortars were worn out, and the battery spent August without guns, providing fatigue parties before it was armed with four modern 6-inch howitzers.

==== Somme ====
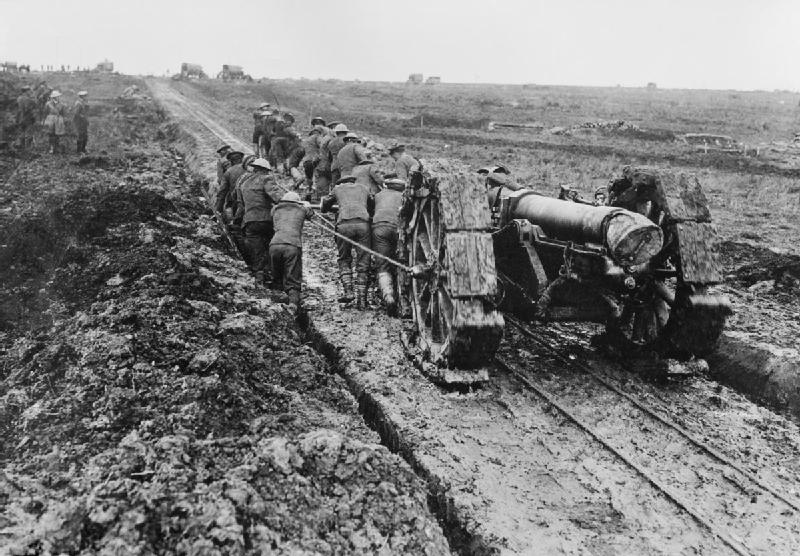
6-inch howitzer being moved through mud in September 1916.

On 12 July, the battery joined in the Somme Offensive. By now, massive quantities of artillery were employed for each phase of the continuing offensive as Fourth Army attacked again and again:

- Battle of Flers-Courcelette (15–22 September)
- Battle of Morval (25–28 September)
- Battle of Le Transloy (1–18 October)
- Battle of the Ancre Heights (3–11 November)
- Battle of the Ancre (13–18 November)

Fourth Army's front remained relatively quiet during early 1917, then in the Spring it was involved in following the German retreat to the Hindenburg Line (Operation Alberich), which entailed much work for the siege gunners in moving their guns over the devastated Somme battlefields to get back into range of the enemy. For most of 1917, the battery was in quiet sectors of the front. On 22 September 1917, 110th Siege Bty was joined by a section from the newly arrived 441st Siege Bty and was made up to a strength of six howitzers.

==== Cambrai ====
In November, the battery was assigned to 21st Heavy Artillery Group (HAG) with Third Army, which was preparing for its surprise attack with tanks at the Battle of Cambrai. There was to be no preliminary bombardment or registration, and the guns were to open fire at Zero hour firing 'off the map' at carefully surveyed targets.

When the battle began with a crash of artillery at 06.20 on 20 November, the German defenders were stunned, and the massed tanks completed their overcome. In most areas, the attack was an outstanding success. Exploitation over succeeding days was less spectacular, though some bombardments were set up to help the infantry take certain villages.

On 30 November, the Germans put in a heavy counter-attack against the weakened and ill-organised troops in the captured positions, which they quickly overran. 110th Siege Bty with its six 6-inch howitzers was at Sonnet Farm in front of La Vacquerie, alongside 108th Siege Bty (formed by the Forth RGA at the same time as 110th). They suffered badly from the German barrage, but 110th managed to get two howitzers into action, firing until Germans reached the rest of Gonnelieu Ridge. The gunners then removed the dial sights before abandoning their howitzers and joining 60th Infantry Brigade with their rifles. Here, the German advance was halted and the battery withdrawn for refitting.

After Cambrai, 110th Siege Bty joined 27th HAG with Fifth Army on 21 December. By now, HAG allocations were becoming more fixed, and on 1 February 1918 they were converted into permanent RGA brigades. 27th Brigade was defined as a Mixed Brigade, with guns and howitzers of several sizes. 110th Siege Bty remained with this brigade until the Armistice.

==== Spring Offensive ====
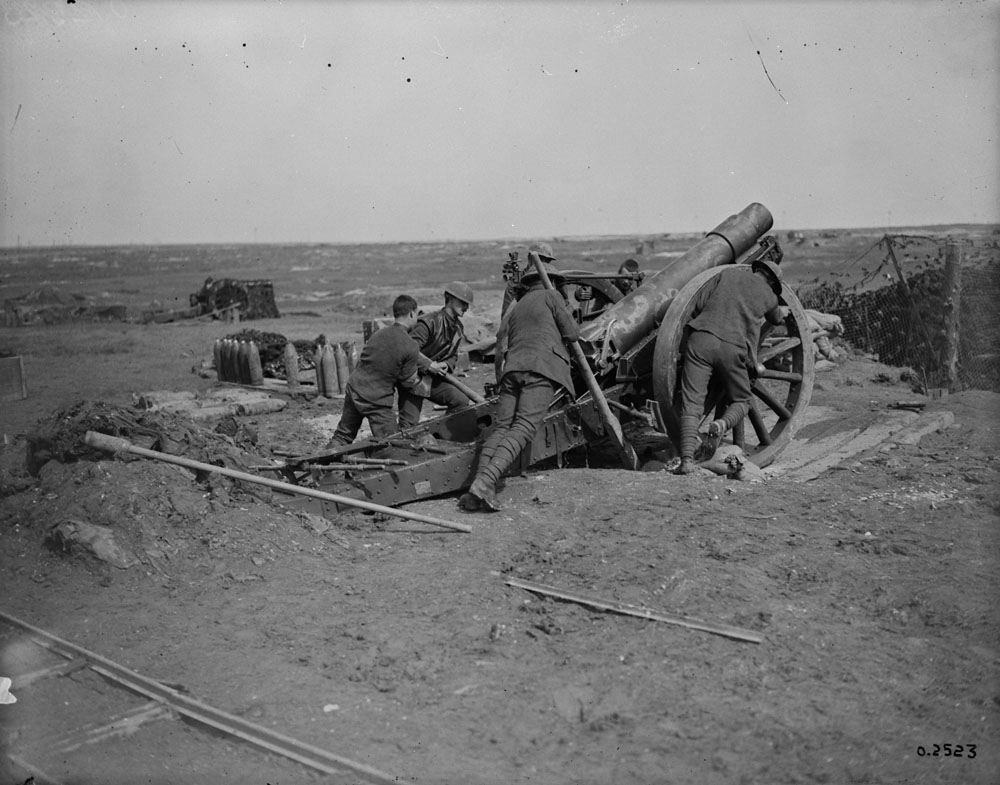
Crew positioning a 6-inch 26 cwt howitzer in February 1918.

Fifth Army was attacked on 21 March 1918, the first day of the German spring offensive. Artillery Observation Posts (OPs) were blinded by early morning mist and many were overrun along with the infantry in the forward zone. Much of the field artillery was lost, caught up in short-range fighting in the main battle zone, as were a number of RGA units either caught in the fighting or forced to abandon their guns as the Germans advanced rapidly. Others struggled to get their guns back during the 'Great Retreat'. Fourth Army HQ took over all of Fifth Army's formations and units on 2 April, and the first phase of the German offensive was halted on 4 April. Further attacks came on other parts of the front, but none broke through completely. 27th Brigade RGA officially joined Fourth Army on 1 May 1918 and remained with it until the Armistice.

==== Hundred Days ====
In late July, Fourth Army began secretly massing its artillery for the Battle of Amiens, which launched the Allied Hundred Days Offensive on 8 August. Four hundred rounds of ammunition per howitzer, much of it gas shell, were dumped near the gun positions, which were occupied by night. The guns remained silent, with no prior registration, relying on 'firing by the map' at Zero hour. The main targets were enemy gun positions, which were swamped with gas. As the tanks and infantry advanced, 6-inch howitzer sections began moving up behind them. The attack was a brilliant success.

Fourth Army launched a series of attacks over succeeding weeks (the Second Battle of the Somme). By the Battle of Cambrai on 8 October, it was becoming difficult for the heavy howitzers to keep up with the advance. For the assault crossing of the River Selle on 17 October a massive fireplan was prepared, with the heavy batteries right forward so that they could reach the German line of retreat across the River Sambre. Fourth Army pushed on again on 23 October. There was no preliminary bombardment: instead the 6-inch howitzers formed the front part of the Creeping barrage but distributed unevenly to deal with specific sunken roads, fortified farms, strongpoints, etc. By now, the offensive had turned into a pursuit, and many of the heavy batteries had to be left behind. Fighting was ended on 11 November by the Armistice with Germany.

Demobilisation began early in 1919, and 110th Siege Battery was disbanded by the middle of the year.

== Interwar ==
With postwar demobilisation, the Clyde RGA was placed in suspended animation during 1919. When the TF was reconstituted on 7 February 1920, the unit was reformed with one battery from No 1 Company and one from Nos 2 and 3, under the command of Brevet Lieutenant-Colonel James Lithgow. When the TF was reorganised as the Territorial Army (TA) in 1921, it was renamed the Clyde Coast Brigade, RGA, with 171 and 172 Batteries. When the RGA was subsumed into the Royal Artillery in 1924, the unit became the Clyde Heavy Brigade, RA. The Clyde unit had its HQ and 171st Heavy Bty at 2 King Street, Port Glasgow, and 172 Hvy Bty at the Drill Hall, Helensburgh, forming part of the coast defence troops in 52nd (Lowland) Divisional Area.

In 1926, it was decided that the coast defences of the UK would be manned by the TA alone. A 1927 report on coastal defences by the Committee of Imperial Defence made recommendations for defence schemes at 15 'Class A' home ports, including the Clyde (Scheme 11), but little was done to modernise them before the outbreak of World War II.

In 1934, 172 Hvy Bty at Helensburgh converted to the medium artillery role and transferred to 62nd (Scottish) Medium Brigade based at Broughty Ferry.

In 1938, the RA replaced it 'brigade' designations with the term 'regiment' the unit became the Clyde Heavy Regiment on 1 November.

== World War II ==
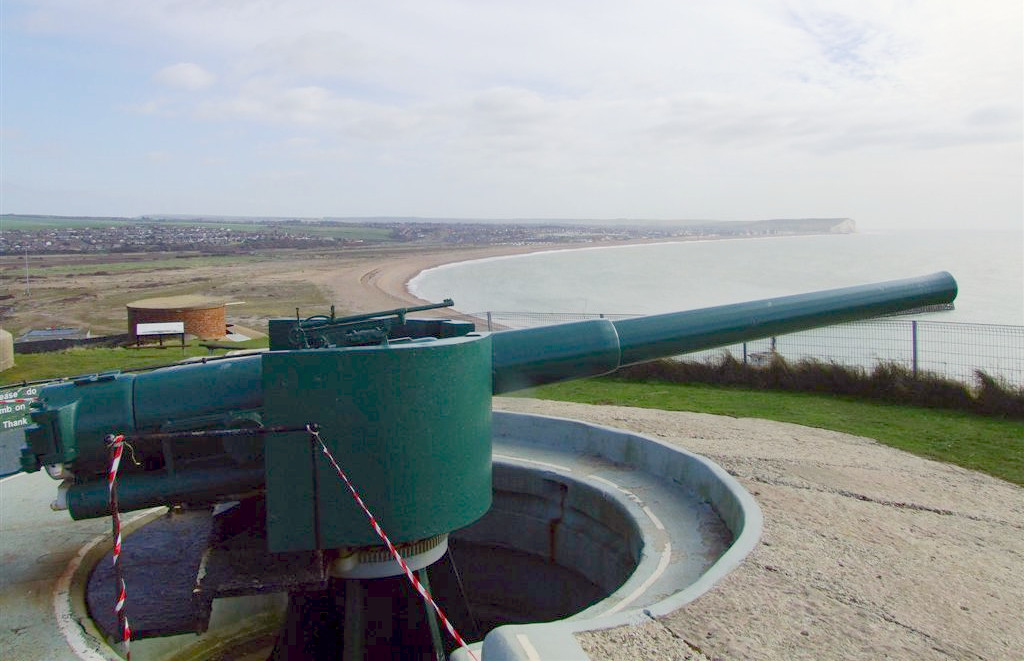
BL 6-inch Mk VII naval gun in typical coast defence mounting (preserved at Newhaven Fort).

=== Mobilisation ===
The regiment mobilised in the Lowland Area of Scottish Command on the outbreak of war in September 1939 with the single 171 Battery (manning 4 × 6-inch guns) under command until 407 Coast Bty joined on 31 December 1940. The coastal artillery regiments began to be reorganised from September 1940, with the Clyde regiment becoming 538th (Clyde) Coast Regiment in January 1941 with A, B, C (all formed from 171) and 407 Coast Btys. (Note: A new independent 171 Coast Bty was formed in April 1941 and later joined 524th (Lancashire & Cheshire) Coast Rgt.) The Clyde defences consisted of:

- 4 × 6-inch guns
- 2 × 4.7-inch guns
- 1 × 12-pounder gun

=== Mid-War ===
On 1 April 1941, A and B Btys were renumbered 152 and 153 Coast Btys, and C Bty was split to form 154 and 155 Coast Btys, giving 538th Coast Rgt the following organisation, which it retained into 1944:

- 152 Bty at Cloch Point
- 153 Bty at Toward Castle – to Stranraer by August 1942
- 154 Bty at Loch Ewe – became independent 7 September 1942
- 155 Bty at Dunoon
- 308 Bty at Ardhallow Battery – independent battery joined 7 September 1942
- 407 Bty at Stranraer – to Toward Castle 31 August 1942

=== Late War ===
The Clyde defences were never engaged during the war. As the threat from German attack diminished there was demand for trained gunners for the fighting fronts and the War Office began reorganising surplus coastal manpower for duties elsewhere. By April 1944 many of the coast battery positions were manned by Home Guard detachments or in the hands of care and maintenance parties.

In June 1945, after VE Day, 407 Bty was disbanded, 153 and 154 passed into suspended animation, and 152 and 308 Btys joined 505th (Forth) Coast Rgt. By the end of the war, 538th (Clyde) Coast Rgt had become the headquarters for a number of batteries stationed in the Orkney & Shetland Defences (OSDEF):

- 141, 142, 144, 158, 268 Btys – previously comprising 534th (Orkney) Coast Rgt
- 223 Bty – previously part of 533rd (Orkney) Coast Rgt
- 369 Bty – previously part of 541st Coast Rgt at Lerwick, Shetland

Between 10 and 31 January 1946, the regiment and its attached batteries passed into suspended animation.

== Postwar ==
When the TA was reconstituted on 1 January 1947, the Clyde coast artillery was reformed as two units, both within 105 Coast Artillery Brigade:

- 416th (Clyde) (Mixed) Coast Regiment at Port Glasgow
- 417th (Dunbartonshire) (Mixed) Coast Regiment at Dumbarton

('Mixed' indicated that members of the Women's Royal Army Corps were integrated into the units.)

However, it was soon afterwards decided to reduce the number of TA coast regiments, and in 1948 417th Coast Rgt was converted into 417th (Dunbartonshire) (Mixed) Heavy Anti-Aircraft Regiment, and then in 1954 it merged into 254th (West Highland) Light Anti-Aircraft Regiment at Dumbarton, becoming a battery of the amalgamated unit, which the following year was absorbed into 277th (Lowland) Field Rgt.

When Coast Artillery Branch of the RA was disbanded in 1956, 416th Coast Rgt became R (Clyde) Bty in 357th (Lowland) Light Rgt based in Edinburgh.

However, when the TA was reduced on 1 May 1961 and 357th (Lowland) Light Rgt was amalgamated with 278th (Lowland) Field Rgt in Edinburgh, R (Clyde) Bty was instead amalgamated with 277th (Lowland) Field Rgt, 402nd (Argyll and Sutherland Highlanders) Light Rgt and 888 (Renfrewshire) Locating Bty to form 277th (Argyll and Sutherland Highlanders) Field Rgt in Renfrewshire, with the following organisation:

- RHQ – ex 277th Rgt
- P (Clyde) Bty – ex R/357th Rgt
- Q Bty – ex 277th Rgt
- R (Paisley) Bty – ex 402nd Rgt

When the TA was further reduced into the Territorial and Army Volunteer Reserve in 1967, the regiment merged into the Lowland Rgt, RA.

== Honorary Colonel ==
The following served as Honorary Colonel of the unit:

- James Cleland Burns, 3rd Lord Inverclyde, appointed 27 March 1909
- Sir James Lithgow, 1st Baronet, CBE, MC, TD, (former CO) appointed 12 July 1924, continued as Hon Col of 416th (Clyde) Coast Rgt.

== External sources ==
- Mark Conrad, The British Army, 1914 (archive site)
- British Army units from 1945 on
- Great War Centenary Drill Halls
- Royal Artillery 1939–1945
