= Orkney Fortress Royal Engineers =

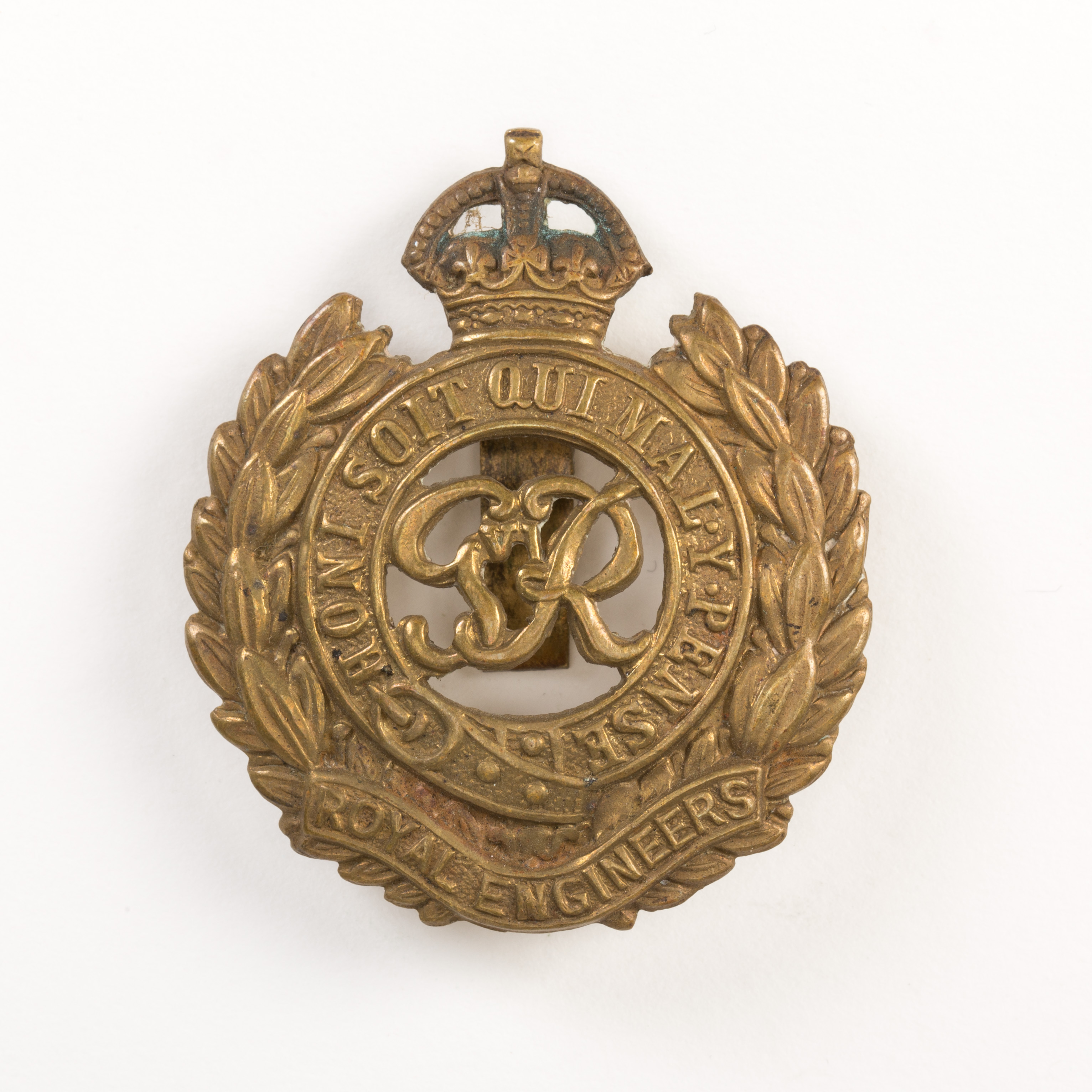
- RE Cap badge (King George VI cipher)
- Active: 1938–1941
- Country: United Kingdom
- Branch: Territorial Force
- Role: Fortress engineers
- Part of: Orkney & Shetland Defences
- Garrison/HQ: Kirkwall

Commanders
- Notable commanders: Captain Eric Linklater

The Orkney Fortress Royal Engineers was a small and short-lived unit of Britain's Territorial Army raised just before World War II to assist in the defence of the Royal Navy base at Scapa Flow in the Orkney Islands.

== Origin ==
While there had been temporary volunteer units in Orkney during the Napoleonic Wars, the popularity of the Volunteer movement in 1859 led to the creation of the 1st Orkney Artillery Volunteers) as a permanent part of the auxiliary forces of the Crown, eventually becoming a coast defence (CD) unit of the Royal Garrison Artillery. However, this unit was disbanded during World War I, the defence of the Grand Fleet's base at Scapa Flow being entrusted to units of the Regular Army. After the war it proved difficult to reform the unit, and there were no Orcadians in the Territorial Army (TA).

The worsening international situation in the late 1930s led to the expansion of the TA, including a revival in Orkney. First, a new anti-aircraft (AA) unit, the 226th (Caithness and Orkney) Heavy Anti-Aircraft Battery, Royal Artillery (RA), began recruiting in Orkney as well as in Caithness (on the Scottish mainland) in 1937. Then the coastal artillery unit was revived as the Orkney Heavy Regiment, RA, in 1938. This was followed by a unit of the Royal Engineers (RE) to support the two artillery units: the Orkney Fortress Royal Engineers.

The local novelist Eric Linklater, who had served in the trenches during World War I, was asked by the Lord Lieutenant of Orkney and Shetland to raise one of these units, and chose the 'Sappers'. He was commissioned as Captain and second-in-command on 16 September 1938, with Major J. Gibson as officer commanding. The unit consisted of a single company with its headquarters at Kirkwall. Its main role was to operate the electrical generators for the Scapa Flow defences and to man the searchlights (S/Ls) for both the AA and CD guns.

== Mobilisation ==
On 22 August 1939, mobilisation warning orders arrived in Kirkwall and Linklater called out his 'Key Party'. The following day, full mobilisation of the TA's AA and CD units was ordered, and the Key Party quickly called in the men from isolated farms and villages to transport them to their war stations on Flotta and at Stromness. Mobilisation was completed by 00.30 on 25 August, 8 hours after receipt of the final order. When war was declared on 3 September, Scapa Flow was defended by a few hundred local Territorials.

== Service ==
Formation sign of OSDEF

The AA guns were in action soon after the outbreak of war when the Luftwaffe attacked the warships in the anchorage in daylight on 17 October 1939, when HMS Iron Duke was damaged, and at dusk on 16 March 1940, when the sappers' S/Ls and Lewis guns were of little use. The Fortress Engineers were also expected to defend their positions with Lewis guns and rifles in case of seaborne attack, fears of which grew after the German invasion of Norway.

Over succeeding months large numbers of AA gun and S/L units were moved into the islands under the Orkney and Shetland Defences (OSDEF), controlled by Anti-Aircraft Command. The fortress engineers were engaged during the winter of 1939/40 with constructing emplacements of corrugated iron and sandbags for 13–14 extra pairs of S/Ls across the islands, with hardstandings for the associated generators and huts for the crews. Later they built camps for the reinforcements, which included two full AA S/L battalions from the Lancashire TA (38th (King's Regiment) and 39th (Lancashire Fusiliers).)

== Disbandment ==
In 1940, AA searchlights became an artillery responsibility, and many of the Orkney men transferred from the RE to the RA. The Orkney Fortress RE was deleted from the order of battle of OSDEF in November 1941. However, an Orkney & Shetland Maintenance Company, RE, continued to serve in the islands.

As a well-known author, Linklater was soon employed by the War Office Public Relations department to write official 'instant histories' of the war, such as The Northern Garrisons (1941) which described the life of British troops stationed in remote locations, including Orkney.

== Successor unit ==
10 (Orkney) Troop, RE, was formed in 2006. Currently based at the Army Reserve Centre in Kirkwall, it forms part of 71 Engineer Regiment, RE. Originally assigned to 236 Field Squadron (Air Support), it was placed under 124 (Lowland) Field Squadron in 2014.
