= North Scottish Royal Garrison Artillery =

North Scottish Royal Garrison Artillery 62nd (Scottish) Medium Regiment, RA 504th (Fife) Coast Regiment, RA 362nd (Highland) HAA Regiment, RA
- Cap Badge of the Royal Regiment of Artillery
- Active: 1908–1961
- Country: United Kingdom
- Branch: Territorial Force
- Role: Coast Artillery
- Part of: Royal Garrison Artillery
- Garrison/HQ: Broughty Ferry

The North Scottish Royal Garrison Artillery and its successors were Scottish part-time coast defence units of the British Army from 1908 to 1961. Although the unit saw no active service, it supplied trained gunners to siege batteries engaged on the Western Front during World War I.

== Origin ==
When the Territorial Force (TF) was created from the old Volunteer Force under the Haldane Reforms of 1908, a new 'defended ports' artillery unit was formed with its headquarters (HQ) at Broughty Ferry, now located within the Dundee City council area on the north bank of the Firth of Tay. It was formed in the Royal Garrison Artillery (RGA) with personnel drawn from four former Volunteer units: 1st Aberdeenshire RGA, 1st Fifeshire RGA, 1st Forfarshire RGA and Highland RGA. The new unit consisted of three companies, rising to four by the outbreak of World War I in 1914:

North Scottish RGA

- HQ: Broughty Ferry
- No 1 Company: Territorial Barracks, Fonthill Road, Aberdeen
- No 2 Company: Cromarty
- No 3 Company: Broughty Ferry
- No 4 Company, Drill Hall, Montrose

The unit was responsible for manning the guns defending the Tay (2 × 6-inch and 2 × 4.7-inch) and Aberdeen (2 × 6-inch).

== World War I ==
=== Mobilisation ===
On the outbreak of war, the North Scottish RGA mobilised in Scottish Coast Defences under the command of Lieutenant-Colonel R.H. Adamson, TD. Shortly afterwards TF units were invited to volunteer for Overseas Service and on 15 August 1914, the War Office (WO) issued instructions to separate those men who had signed up for Home Service only, and form these into reserve units. On 31 August, the formation of a reserve or 2nd Line unit was authorised for each 1st Line unit where 60 per cent or more of the men had volunteered for Overseas Service. The titles of these 2nd Line units would be the same as the original, but distinguished by a '2/' prefix. In this way duplicate companies and batteries were created, releasing the 1st Line units to be sent overseas.

By October 1914, the campaign on the Western Front was bogging down into Trench warfare and there was an urgent need for batteries of Siege artillery to be sent to France. The WO decided that the TF coastal gunners were well enough trained to take over many of the duties in the coastal defences, releasing Regular RGA gunners for service in the field, and 1st line RGA companies that had volunteered for overseas service had been authorised to increase their strength by 50 per cent.

Although complete defended ports units never left the UK, they did supply drafts of trained gunners to RGA units serving overseas. They also provided cadres to form complete new units for front line service. Two of the siege batteries formed in 1915–16 (67th and 109th) had cadres provided by the North Scottish RGA, while a number of others formed later in the Tay Defences (151st, 192nd, 231st, 254th, 267th, 283rd, 308th) may have included trained men from the unit among the recruits, although the Army Council Instructions did not specifically order this.

Under Army Council Instruction 686 of April 1917, the coastal defence companies of the RGA (TF) were reorganised. The North Scottish RGA had six companies serving in the Aberdeen and Tay Garrison (1/1st, 1/2nd, 1/3rd, 1/4th, 2/2nd and 2/3rd) and one (2/1st Company) in the Forth Garrison, was reduced to just three (numbered 1–3), which were to be kept up to strength with Regular recruits.

The Scottish Coastal Defences never saw action during the war. By April 1918, the Aberdeen and Tay defences under No 22 Coastal Fire Command (Broughty Ferry) consisted of:

- Castle Green Battery, Broughty Ferry – 2 × 6-inch Mk VII guns
- Broughty Castle Battery – 2 × 4.7-inch guns
- Torry Point Battery, Aberdeen – 2 × 6-inch Mk VII guns

=== 67th Siege Battery, RGA ===
67th Siege Battery was formed under War Office Instruction 144 of October 1915 from one company of the North Scottish RGA (TF). The battery went out to the Western Front on 18 March 1916 manning four 8-inch howitzers. (Note: At this stage of the war the 8-inch howitzers in use (Marks I–V) were improvised from cut-down and bored-out barrels of 6-inch coast defence guns, with the recoil checked by enormous wooden wedges.) At this time, batteries were switched between Heavy Artillery Groups (HAGs) as required. 67th Siege Bty was with 21st HAG by the middle of June.

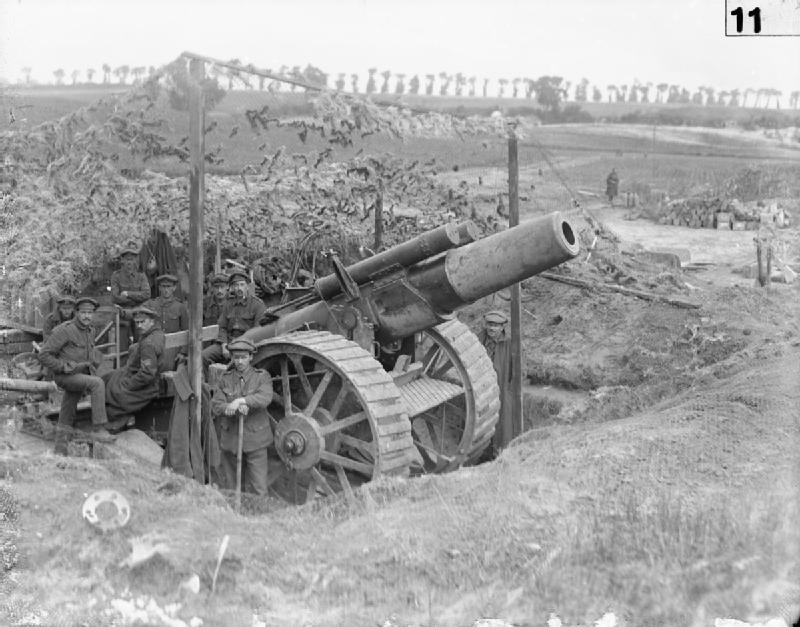
8-inch Howitzer on the Somme, July 1916.

==== Somme ====
21st Heavy Artillery Group was with Fourth Army preparing for that summer's 'Big Push' (the Battle of the Somme). It was one of the groups assigned to XV Corps facing the Fricourt Salient, a position of considerable strength in the German line. The bombardment programme was to extend over five days, U, V, W, X and Y, before the assault was launched on Z day. It began on 24 June, but on several days the weather was too bad for good air or ground observation and the programme was extended by two days (Y1 and Y2). When the infantry launched their assault at 07.30 on Z Day (1 July), XV Corps made better progress than most other parts of the front, capturing Mametz and Fricourt. It could have pushed forward on 2 July if its neighbouring formations had not already suffered disaster, but opposition stiffened as the day went on.

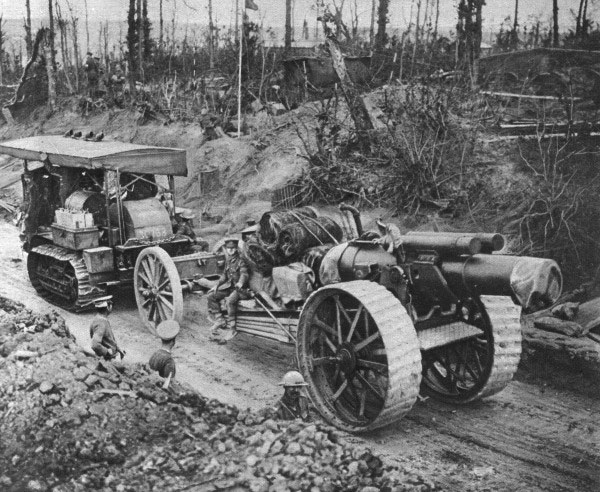
8-inch Howitzer under tow by a Holt 75 tractor on the Somme, July 1916.

XV Corps continued fighting throughout the Somme Offensive, including the battles for High Wood, Delville Wood, Flers and the Transloy Ridges until the middle of October. 67th Siege Bty was transferred to 3rd HAG on 2 December. It was then taken out of the line for rest on 16 January 1917.

==== Arras ====
The battery joined VI Corps' Heavy Artillery in Third Army on 2 February 1917, employed in digging positions while their guns were not in action. It was assigned to 10th HAG supporting VI Corps in the forthcoming Battle of Arras. There were many more guns available for this attack and the artillery plan was much more carefully worked out than previous operations. VI Corps' attack on 9 April was relatively successful. However, the follow-up over succeeding days was less successful, the guns having to be moved forward through mud and destruction, and the later bombardments were rushed and less effective.

==== Ypres ====
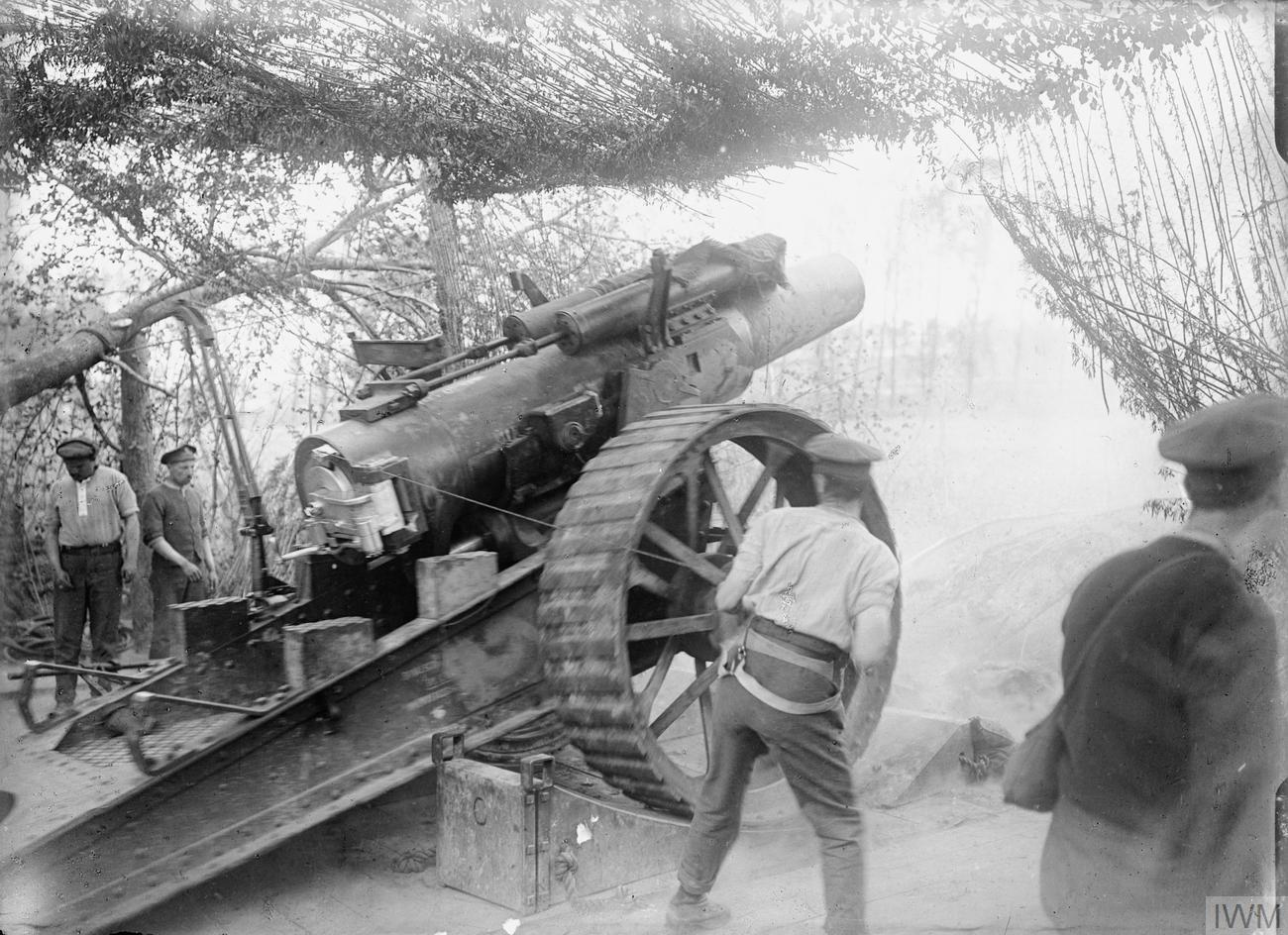
8-inch Howitzer at almost full recoil.

67th Siege Bty transferred to Fifth Army in the Ypres Salient in 19 May. It was then made up to six howitzers and was joined in by personnel from newly arrived 318th Siege Bty. On 29 June, the expanded battery joined 99th HAG in Second Army as Second and Fifth Armies prepared for the forthcoming Third Ypres Offensive. Second Army's role was to provide flank support, but as the campaign bogged down it took over direction of the battle in September. The Battles of the Menin Road, Polygon Wood and Broodseinde were highly successful because of the weight of artillery brought to bear on German positions. But as the offensive continued with the Poelcappelle and First and Second Battles of Passchendaele, the tables were turned: British batteries were clearly observable from the Passchendaele Ridge and were subjected to CB fire, while their own guns sank into the mud and became difficult to aim and fire.

==== Later war ====
67th Siege Bty was rested from 23 December to 15 January 1918. On 1 February 1918, the HAGs were converted into permanent RGA brigades. 67th Siege Bty remained with 62nd Brigade with Third Army until the Armistice. Part of Third Army was engaged in the desperate fighting of the German spring offensive, but overall it was not obliged to retreat as far or to abandon as many heavy guns as Fifth Army further south. The German offensive had been halted on Third Army's front by 5 April.

Third Army joined in the Allies' victorious Hundred Days Offensive with the Battle of Albert on 23/24 August, when it swept across the old Somme battlefields. By the end of August, 62nd Bde RGA was with XVII Corps, attacking the Drocourt-Quéant Switch Line on 2 September. The advance was well-prepared by the heavy artillery and the attack was a major success

Third Army continued its advance through the Hindenburg Line positions and across the Canal du Nord. On 8 October 62nd Bde supported XVII Corps in encircling Cambrai and compelling its evacuation by the enemy. On 12 October, XVII Corps probed forwards towards the River Selle. The 8th Battalion Queen's Royal Regiment (West Surrey) went forward supported by 62nd Bde and patrols from the Queen's managed to cross the river by the one remaining girder of a blown bridge. Third Army resumed its attack (the Battle of the Selle) on 20 October to clear the remaining area west of the Selle. No preliminary barrage was fired, the infantry attacking at 02.00 under a full moon to achieve surprise, supported by 62nd Bde.

The last set-piece attack was the Battle of the Sambre. Zero hour for Third Army was 05.30 on 4 November, and XVII Corps attacked with complete success – some units advancing beyond their objectives – supported by 62nd Bde and many other guns, some of which had to move forward during the morning to bring down fire on the further objectives in the afternoon.

By now, the offensive had turned into a pursuit, and many of the heavy batteries had to be left behind. Fighting was ended on 11 November by the Armistice with Germany. 67th Siege Battery was retained in the postwar army, but disappeared before 1922.

=== 109th Siege Battery, RGA ===
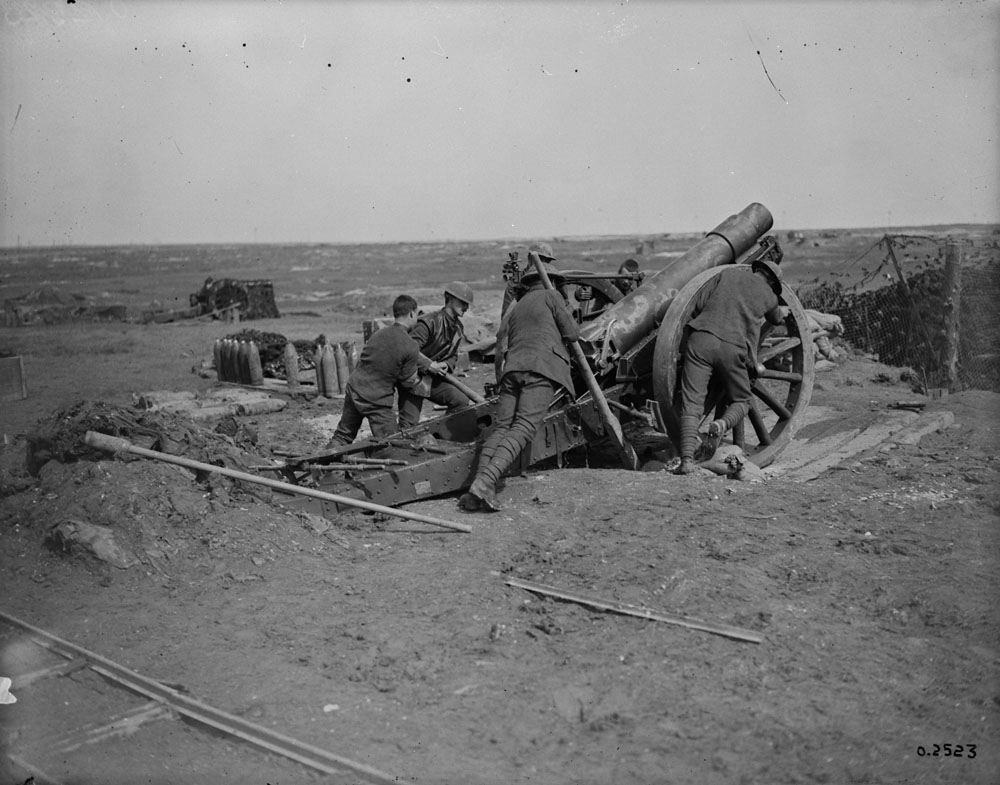
Crew positioning a 6-inch 26 cwt howitzer.

109th Siege Battery, RGA, was formed at Dover on 14 February 1916. A cadre of three officers and 78 other ranks (the establishment of a TF RGA company) was sent from the North Scottish RGA to form the basis of the new battery. Although the Army Council Instruction specified that the establishment of this batch of new batteries would be those for 6-inch guns, 8-inch or 9.2-inch howitzers, when 109th Siege Bty went overseas it was equipped with four 6-inch howitzers. It was apparently never raised to the 6-gun establishment that most batteries achieved in 1917.

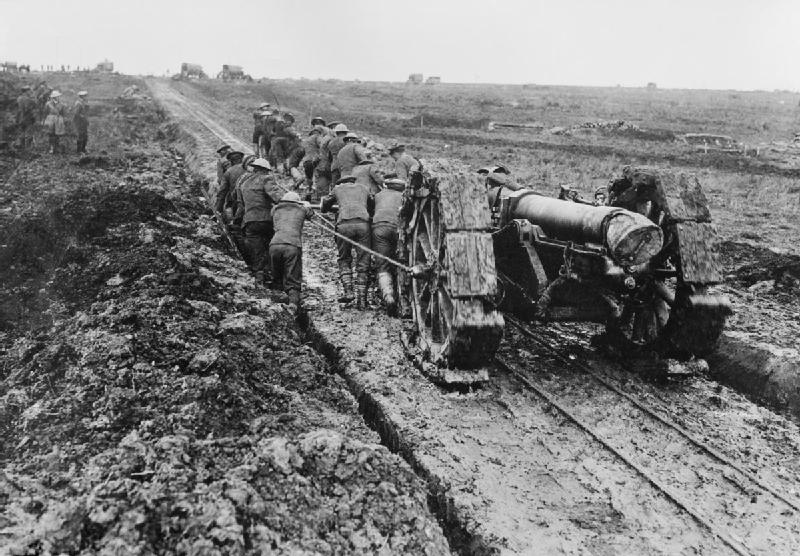
6-inch howitzer being moved through mud on the Western Front.

The battery went out to the Western Front on 7 June 1916 and joined 30th HAG with Fourth Army in time for the Battle of the Somme. It moved to 57th HAG on 15 February 1917, then when 57th moved to First Army, 109th Siege Bty moved to 62nd HAG and remained with Fourth Army. At this time, Fourth Army was following the German retirement to the Hindenburg Line (Operation Alberich) and gun sites and ammunition dumps had to be laboriously relocated. Later, Fourth Army spent the summer months on the Flanders coast, waiting to cooperate with a breakthrough at the Ypres Salient that never came. 109th Siege Bty moved to 28th HAG on 19 May, to 27th HAG on 30 June, 44th (South African) HAG on 8 August, then to 81st HAG (Fifth Army) on 29 September and then to 72nd HAG with Third Army. 72nd HAG moved to Second Army in the Ypres Salient on 9 November, but the Third Ypres Offensive was just petering out, and soon afterwards Second Army HQ moved to the Italian Front and Fourth Army HQ took over. 109th Siege Bty moved to 47th HAG on 18 December and remained with it (as 47th Brigade, RGA, from 1 February 1918) until the Armistice.

47th Brigade, RGA, was defined as an '8-inch Howitzer' brigade, but that was the largest equipment; three out of its four batteries, including 109th, were armed with 6-inch howitzers. 47th Brigade was transferred from Fourth to Fifth Army on 14 March 1918, and was therefore caught up in the German Spring Offensive and the 'Great Retreat'. It moved back to Fourth Army's command on 1 May.

The battery took part in Fourth Army's advances during the Hundred Days Offensive. By the Battle of the Selle, on 17 October, the 6-inch howitzer batteries of 47th Bde were supporting XIII Corps, with vigorous CB work and concentrations on important localities. XIII Corps' follow-up attack on 23 October was accompanied by equally powerful support, even though poor weather on the preceding days limited air observation and spotting of enemy batteries.

XIII Corps halted its pursuit on 9 November and only light forces maintained touch with the retreating Germans until the Armistice. 109th Siege Battery was to have become C Bty in LXXIII Bde RGA in the postwar army, but was disbanded after the Treaty of Versailles was signed.

== Interwar ==
The North Scottish RGA was placed in suspended animation in 1919 and reformed in 1920 with two batteries derived from the former Nos 1 and 3 Companies. The following year, the TF was reconstituted as the Territorial Army (TA) and the unit was renamed as the North Scottish Coast Brigade, RGA, with 173 and 174 Coast Batteries. 'Coast Brigade' was changed to 'Heavy Brigade' when the RGA was subsumed into the Royal Artillery (RA) in 1924. The reformed unit had its HQ and 173 Heavy Bty at Queen Street, Broughty Ferry, and 174 Heavy Bty at Fonthill Barracks, Aberdeen, later at Wellington Street, Montrose. It formed part of the coast defence troops in 51st (Highland) Divisional Area.

=== 62nd (Scottish) Medium Brigade, RA ===
On 1 April 1934, the unit was converted to the role of mobile medium artillery for service in the field, initially as 62nd (North Scottish) Medium Brigade, RA, then, from January 1936, as 62nd (Scottish) Medium Brigade, RA. It was joined by 160 Bty from the Forth Coast Bde at Edinburgh and 172 Bty from the Clyde Coast Bde at Helensburgh.

- HQ: The Castle, Broughty Ferry
- 160 (Forth) Medium Bty: Easter Road Barracks, Edinburgh
- 172 (Clyde) Medium Bty (Howitzers): Drill Hall, Helensburgh
- 173 (North Scottish) Medium Bty (Howitzers): Queen Street, Broughty Ferry
- 174 (North Scottish) Medium Bty (Howitzers): Fonthill Barracks, Aberdeen

At this time, medium brigades consisted of one battery of six 60-pounder guns and three of six 6-inch howitzers, all of World War I vintage but which by 1937 had been modernised with pneumatic tyres.

=== Fife Heavy Regiment, RA ===
The TA underwent expansion and reorganisation after the Munich Crisis of 1938. On 1 November 1938, the brigade was redesignated a regiment under new RA nomenclature, and 160 Med Bty reverted to 160 Hvy Bty under Forth Heavy Rgt. Then, on 28 November, 172 Med Bty was converted into 216 Anti-Tank Bty of 54th (Queen's Own Royal Glasgow Yeomanry) Anti-Tank Regiment, while 174 Med Bty joined 56th (Highland) Medium Rgt about the same time. Then, just before the outbreak of war in 1939, the Regimental HQ and remaining 173 Bty of 62nd Medium Regiment were joined by 163 Bty at Hunter Street, Kirkcaldy, from the Forth Heavy Rgt and re-converted to the coast defence role as the Fife Heavy Regiment, RA. Regimental HQ moved across the Tay to Kirkcaldy in Fifeshire.

A 1927 report on coastal defences by the Committee of Imperial Defence had made recommendations for the defence of 15 'Class A' home ports, including the Firth of Forth (Scheme 7), but little was done to modernise them before the outbreak of World War II. Defences for the Tay were considered in 1930, but Dundee was designated a 'Class C' port and by 1939 was being considered for removal from the list.

== World War II ==
The TA's coast defences were mobilised on the outbreak of war in September 1939. (Since 1926, the coast defences of the UK had been manned by the TA alone.) After the Dunkirk evacuation a crash programme of coastal defence works was initiated against the invasion threat. The coastal artillery regiments were reorganised again in July 1940, and the Fife Heavy Regiment in the Forth Defences was split into two:

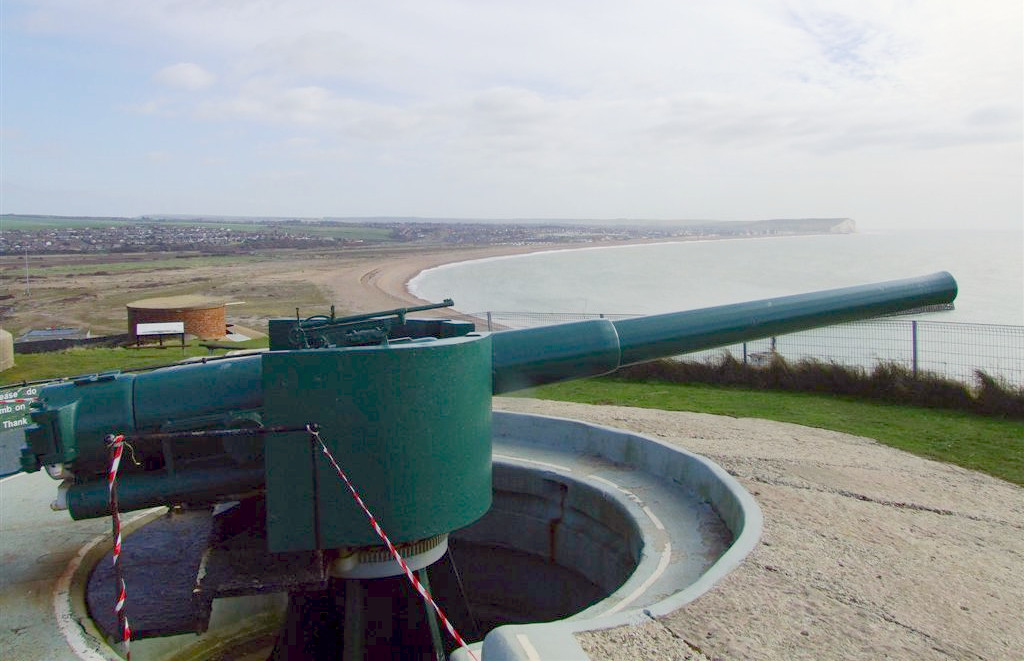
Mk VII 6-inch gun in typical coast defence emplacement, preserved at Newhaven Fort.

- 504th (Fife) Coast Rgt
  - Regimental HQ (RHQ) and A, B, C and D Btys
- 507th (Fife) Coast Rgt
  - RHQ and A Bty

On 1 April 1941, the batteries were reorganised as follows:

- A/504 Coast Bty became:
  - 245 Coast Bty at Inchcolm
  - 246 Coast Bty at Kent Works
- B/504 Coast Bty became:
- 247 Coast Bty at Inchmickery
- C/504 Coast Bty became:
- 248 Coast Bty at Cramond Island
- 249 Coast Bty at Dalmeny
- D/504 Coast Bty became:
  - 250 Coast Bty at Charles Hill (near Braefoot Bay)
- A/507 Coast Bty became:
  - 258 Coast Bty at Kincraig

Between 15 and 21 May 1941, 246 Coast Bty was exchanged for 176 Coast Bty from 533rd (Orkney) Coast Rgt, and 176 took over the battery at Kent Works.

At their height, in September 1941, the coastal defences of the Forth comprised the following guns:

- 3 × 9.2-inch guns
- 16 × 6-inch guns
- 4 × 12-pounder guns
- 6 × 6-pounder guns

(At the same time, Dundee had 4 × 6-inch and Montrose had 2 × 6-inch. The Broughty Ferry guns were manned by 503rd (Forth) Coast Rgt and by the local Home Guard.)

However, as the invasion threat receded, these defences were seen as absorbing excessive manpower. In 1942, 507th Coast Rgt was placed in suspended animation and its only battery (258) was expanded into a battery and Fire Command in 506th (Forth) Coast Rgt. RHQ of 504th Coast Rgt moved to Inchcolm in the Firth of Forth as part of Inchcolm Fire Command within Fixed Defences Forth.

By 1944, serious naval attacks on the United Kingdom could be discounted and the War Office began disbanding surplus coastal units and redeploying their personnel. On 1 April 1944, RHQ 504th (Fife) Coast Rgt was placed in suspended animation and its batteries (176, 245, 247, 248 and 250) came under the command of 505th (Forth) Coast Rgt. 186 Coast Bty itself passed into suspended animation on 1 June 1945.

== Postwar ==
When the TA was reconstituted on 1 January 1947, 504th and 507th Coast Rgts were amalgamated once more to form 362 Medium Regiment with RHQ at Montrose. The new unit was in 84 (Field) Army Group Royal Artillery (AGRA). When 84 AGRA was disbanded in 1950, the regiment was reorganised on 1 July 1950 as 362 (Highland) Heavy Anti-Aircraft Regiment. This was short-lived, and on 1 February 1952 the regiment was amalgamated with 886 Locating Bty as 862 Locating Bty with Battery HQ at Dundee.

There were further cuts to the TA in 1961, when the battery amalgamated with 275 and 276 (Highland) Field Rgts as 400 (Highland) (Aberdeen/Angus) Field Regiment, with 862 Bty forming Q (Arbroath/Montrose) Battery. After further mergers, the regiment was disbanded in 1975, but since 1986 105 (Scottish) Air Defence Rgt has been the designated successor unit.

== Honorary Colonels ==
The following served as Honorary Colonel of the unit:

- Col J. Davidson, appointed 8 December 1913
- Lt-Col R.H. Adamson, CBE, TD, former CO, appointed 8 February 1922
- Col J.Y.H. Ridout, DSO, appointed 24 March 1937
