= Orkney Heavy Regiment, Royal Artillery =

Former British Army unit

Orkney Heavy Regiment, RA 533rd (Orkney) Coast Rgt, RA 534th (Orkney) Coast Rgt, RA 535th (Orkney) Coast Rgt, RA 430th (Orkney & Zetland) Coast Rgt, RA 861 (Orkney & Zetland) LAA Bty, RA
- Cap badge of the Royal Artillery (pre-1953)
- Active: 1 November 1938 – 1 May 1961
- Country: United Kingdom
- Branch: Territorial Army
- Role: Coast Artillery; Air Defence
- Size: 1–3 Regiments
- Part of: Orkney & Shetland Defence Force
- Garrison/HQ: Kirkwall
- Engagements: World War II

The Orkney Heavy Regiment was a Territorial Army unit of Britain's Royal Artillery raised in the Orkney Islands just before World War II. During the war, it was greatly expanded to defend the vital naval base of Scapa Flow. It was reformed postwar and later became an air defence battery.

== Precursor units ==
There had been previous volunteer artillery units in the Orkney Islands: the Kirkwall Gunners during the Napoleonic Wars, and the 1st Orkney Artillery Volunteers (OAV) formed in 1860. By 1914, the OAV had become the Orkney Royal Garrison Artillery tasked with defending the new naval base at Scapa Flow, but during the war this role was taken over by the Royal Marine Artillery. Although the Orkney RGA was reformed postwar, it was short-lived and disbanded in 1922. (Note: One source suggests that the Orkney Coast Brigade reformed in 1920 was placed in suspended animation in 1922 and was revived in 1938; however. other sources state that it was disbanded and that the Orkney Hvy Rgt was a new unit.)

== Origin ==
In 1926, it had been decided that the responsibility for coast defences in the UK would rest solely with the part-time Territorial Army (TA). After the Munich Crisis in 1938 there was a rapid expansion of the TA, particularly for coast and air defence. With the Royal Navy's Home Fleet due to be based at Scapa Flow once more if war came, defences for the anchorage were an urgent requirement. The Lord Lieutenant of Orkney and Shetland, Alfred Baikie, took the lead in raising batteries of anti-aircraft and coast artillery and fortress engineers in the islands.

A new Orkney Heavy Regiment, RA was formed on 1 November 1938, comprising regimental headquarters (RHQ) and 190 Heavy Battery at Kirkwall, under the command of Lieutenant-Colonel F. Buchanan. The new unit manned the coast guns at Stanger Head, Flotta, Ness Battery and Stromness, and was supported by the Orkney Fortress Royal Engineers formed at the same time, which were responsible for the searchlights (S/Ls) and generators. Recruiting for these units was good, and they had all attended summer training camps before war broke out on 3 September 1939.

== World War II ==
=== Mobilisation ===
On the outbreak of war, the Orkney Heavy Rgt was mobilised to man four 6-inch guns and one 4.7-inch gun.

The entrances to Scapa Flow were supposed to be closed by blockships and booms, but, on the night of 14 October 1939, the German submarine U-47 commanded by Günther Prien slipped on the surface between two blockships unseen by the coastal defences and sank the battleship HMS Royal Oak lying at anchor. As a result, the Home Fleet left Scapa Flow until the booms and defences had been improved (including the Churchill Barriers).

=== Home defence ===
Formation sign of OSDEF

After the sinking of Royal Oak, the increase in defences of Scapa Flow became a priority. 190 Heavy Bty was split into two units. (Note: It is reported that these were termed 198 and 199 Heavy Regiments, but this is unconfirmed by other sources; the numerals indicate that these were batteries.) Then, with the threat of invasion after the Dunkirk evacuation, the coastal artillery defending the whole United Kingdom was greatly increased. While the majority of coast defence units were under the local corps or district HQ, the Orkney & Shetland Defences ('OSDEF') came under the control of Anti-Aircraft Command, which had a strong presence on the islands. By July, the Orkneys had the following guns emplaced:

- 11 × 6-inch
- 3 × 4.7-inch
- 17 × 12-pounders
- 9 × 6-pounders

On 5 September 1940, the Orkney Heavy Rgt was split into three to man these guns, designated 533rd to 535th (Orkney) Coast Rgts. Later, the independent batteries stationed on Shetland were regimented as 1st Coast Artillery Group (later 541st Special Coast Rgt). Given the small local population, most of the manpower for this expansion came from the UK mainland. They were stationed in remote locations on Orkney and Shetland. During 1941, a programme of rotating batteries with other parts of the UK came into effect.

==== 533rd (Orkney) Coast Regiment ====
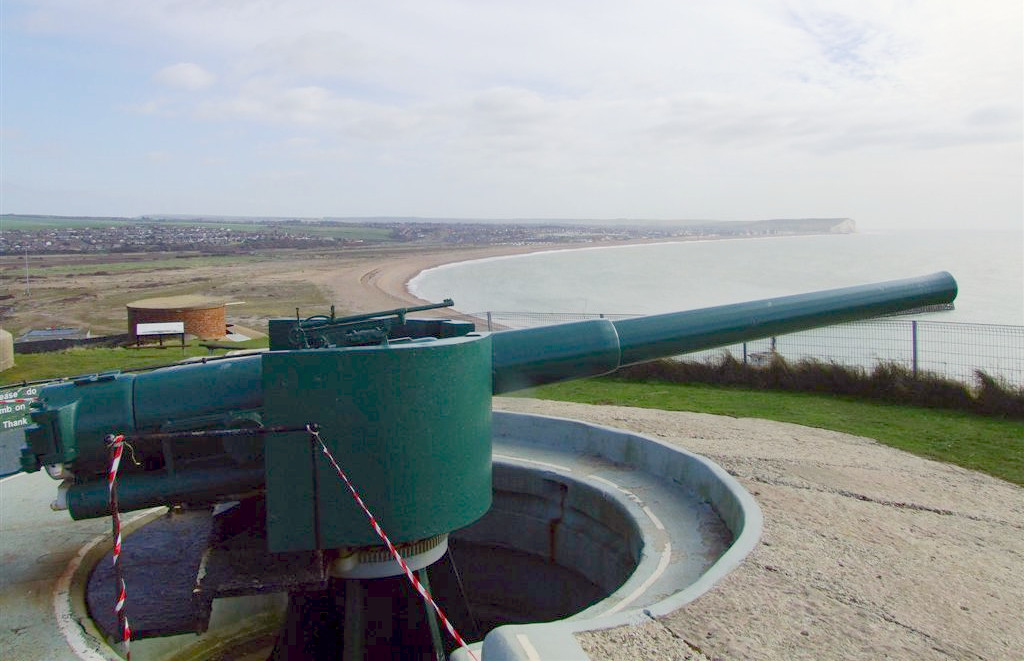
Mk VII 6-inch gun in typical coast defence emplacement, preserved at Newhaven Fort.

Responsible for the southern defences in Flotta Fire Command, formed with A, B and C Coast Btys, later organised as:

- 133 Bty at Stanger Head – formed from part of A Bty 1 April 1941
- 134 Bty at Buchanan Battery – formed from part of A Bty 1 April 1941; transferred to 522nd (Dorsetshire) Coast Rgt 5 June 1941
- 135 Bty at Neb Battery – formed from part of A Bty 1 April 1941; disbanded 22 August 1941, personnel transferred to 136 Bty
- 136 Bty at Gate – formed from part of A Bty 1 April 1941
- 137 Bty at Balfour – formed from part of B Bty 1 April 1941; transferred to 568th (Devon) Coast Rgt 26 June 1941
- 138 Bty at Holm – formed from part of C Bty 1 April 1941; transferred to 515th (Suffolk) Coast Rgt 27 June 1941
- 139 Bty at Burray – formed from part of C Bty 1 April 1941; transferred to 511th (Durham) Coast Rgt 5 June 1941
- 140 Bty at Cara – formed from part of C Bty 1 April 1941 transferred to 554th Coast Rgt 26 June 1941
- 166 Bty – joined at Buchanan from 559th Coast Rgt 3 June 1941
- 169 Bty – joined at Balfour from 520th (Kent & Sussex) Coast Rgt 22 May 1941
- 176 Bty – formed from part of B Bty at Hoxa 3 March 1941; to 504th (Fife) Coast Rgt 15 May 1941
- 199 Bty – independent twin 6-pdr battery joined at Lamb Holm 8 October 1941, to Cara 9 December 1942
- 208 Bty – joined at Hoxa from 524th (Lancashire & Cheshire) Coast Rgt 1 March 1941
- 223 Bty – 12-pdr battery formed at Norton Camp, Isle of Wight, 27 February 1941 by 72nd Coast Training (CT) Rgt, joined at Burray 20 May 1941
- 224 Bty – 6-inch battery formed at East Blockhouse, Milford Haven, 27 February 1941 by 2nd CT Bty, joined at Holm 25 May 1941
- 246 Bty – joined at Cara from 520th (Kent & Sussex) Coast Rgt 22 May 1941
- Coast Artillery (CA) S/L Detachment – joined from 72nd CT Rgt 8 October 1941

==== 534th (Orkney) Coast Regiment ====
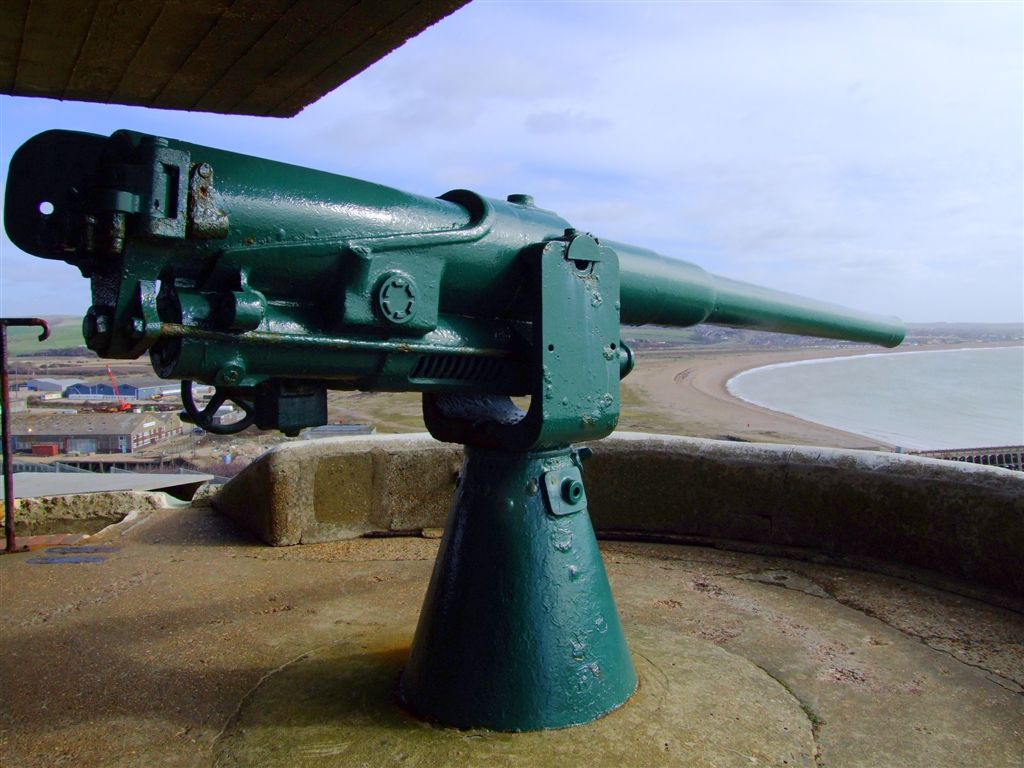
12-pounder gun in coast defence mounting at Newhaven Fort.

Responsible for the western defences in Stromness Fire Command, formed with A, B and C Coast Btys, later organised as:

- 141 Bty at Stromness – formed from part of A Bty 1 April 1941
- 142 Bty at Links – formed from part of A Bty 1 April 1941
- 143 Bty at Houton – redesignated from B Bty 1 April 1941; became independent at Dreghorn Barracks, Edinburgh, 11 June 1941
- 144 Bty at Skerry – formed from part of C Bty 1 April 1941
- 145 Bty at Scad – formed from part of C Bty 1 April 1941; became independent at Great Crosby, Lancashire, 5 June 1941
- 158 Bty – joined at Houton from 568th (Devon) Coast Rgt 8 June 1941
- 268 Bty – joined at Scad from 511th (Durham) Coast Rgt 3 June 1941

==== 535th (Orkney) Coast Regiment ====
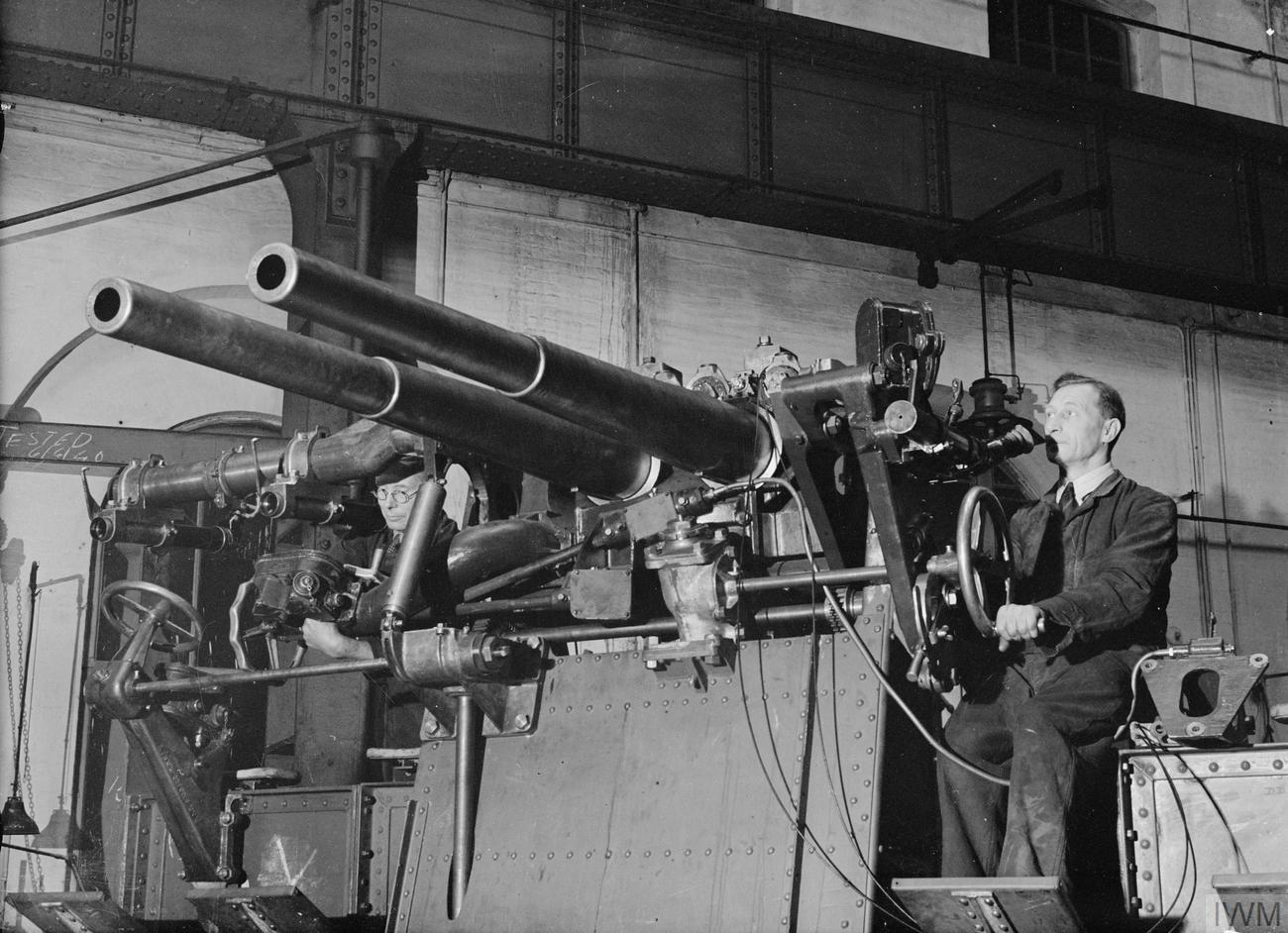
6-pounder gun in twin coastal artillery mount

Responsible for the eastern defences in Kirkwall Fire Command, formed with A, B, C and D Coast Btys, later organised as:

- 146 Bty at Lerwick, Shetland – redesignated from A Bty 1 April 1941; transferred to 21st Coast Group 28 May 1941
- 147 Bty at Deer Sound – formed 14 April 1941
- 148 Bty at Galtness – redesignated from B Bty 1 April 1941
- 149 Bty at Carness – 6-inch battery formed from part of C Bty 1 April 1941; transferred to 553rd Coast Rgt 11 June 1941
- 150 Bty at Carness – 12-pdr battery formed from part of C Bty 1 April 1941
- 151 Bty at Wass Wick – redesignated from D Bty 1 April 1941
- 222 Bty – 6-inch battery formed at Norton Camp 27 February 1941 by 72nd CT Rgt, joined at Lerwick 20 May 1941
- 329 Bty – joined at Carness from 515th (Suffolk) Coast Rgt 8 June 1941
- CA S/L Detachment - joined 7 November 1941

=== Mid-War ===
There were few changes in the organisation of the Orkney coast defences during the middle years of the war. Then in the spring of 1943 there was another round of exchanges with regiments in the rest of the UK:

533rd (Orkney) Rgt:

- 129 Bty – from 530th Princess Beatrice's (Isle of Wight Rifles) Coast Rgt by 13 April 1943
- 136 Bty – to 530th (PBIoWR) Coast Rgt by 13 April 1943
- 307 Bty – from 501st (Forth) Coast Rgt by July 1943
- 133, 166, 169, 199, 208, 223, 224, 246 Btys – unchanged

534th (Orkney) Rgt:

- 106 Bty – from 522nd (Dorset) Coast Rgt by 13 April 1943
- 142 Bty – to 519th (Kent & Sussex) Coast Rgt by 13 April 1943
- 144 Bty – to 572nd Coast Rgt by 13 April
- 292 Bty – from 519th (K&S) Coast Rgt by 13 April
- 141, 158, 268 Btys – unchanged

535th (Orkney) Rgt

- 147 Bty – to War Office control by 3 May
- 150 Bty – to 544th Coast Rgt by 1 June
- 151 Bty – to 514th (Suffolk) Coast Rgt by 1 June
- 352 Bty – from 546th Coast Rgt by July 1943
- 148, 222, 329 Btys – unchanged

(A number of these exchanges were either cancelled or short-term, the batteries returning later.)

=== Late War ===
By 1943, the threat from German attack had diminished and there was demand for trained gunners for the fighting fronts. A process of reducing the manpower in the coast defences began. The manpower requirements for the forthcoming Allied invasion of Normandy (Operation Overlord) led to further reductions in coast defences in April 1944. By this stage of the war, many of coast battery positions were manned by Home Guard detachments or in the hands of care and maintenance parties. Many personnel from the regiments on Orkney were transferred to the infantry or to the RA's garrison regiments, which carried out occupation duties on the Continent. On 1 April 1944 533rd (Orkney) Rgt lost three batteries: 199 (disbanded), 223 (to 534th (Orkney) Coast Rgt) and 246 (suspended animation) (Note: Established prewar TA units could not be simply disbanded; instead they were placed in 'suspended animation'.)

After VE Day, the coast defences were stood down. On 1 June 1945, RHQ of 534th Coast Rgt entered suspended animation at Stromness and its remaining batteries (141, 142, 144, 158, 223, 268) joined 538th (Clyde) Coast Rgt, which acted as a holding unit for Scottish coast batteries, while RHQ of 535th Coast Rgt went into suspended animation at Kirkwall with three batteries (148, 150, 151), the remainder (222, 329, 352) being disbanded. Finally, 533rd Coast Rgt and its remaining batteries (133, 136, 166, 169, 208, 224) were placed in suspended animation on 1 January 1946, together with the ex-Orkney batteries with 538th Coast Rgt.

== Postwar ==
Postwar discussions on the future shape of the TA had suggested two regiments of coast artillery for Orkney and Shetland, but when it was estimated that the maximum recruitment potential of the two sparsely populated island groups was only 600 men, this was scaled back to a single regiment. Thus, when the TA was reconstituted on 1 January 1947, 534th and 535th Coast Regiments were formally disbanded, while 533rd was reformed as 430 (Orkney) Coast Rgt, RA, renamed 430 (Orkney & Zetland) Coast Regiment on 1 July 1951. It was to be organised as follows:

- RHQ at Hatston Camp, Kirkwall
- P Bty (Heavy) at Hatston
- Q Bty (Medium) at the Royal Naval Reserve Drill Hall, Fort Charlotte, Lerwick
- R Bty (Medium) at Lerwick
- S Bty (Light) at Kirkwall

It formed part of 105 Coast Artillery Brigade, which covered Scotland and Northern Ireland.

The regiment was commanded by Lt-Col J.B. Donaldson, a Regular gunner who was Garrison Commander in Orkney, with Major B.L. Swanney, a TA officer who had served in the Orkney Heavy Regiment, as his second-in-command. By 1951, Maj Swanney had been promoted to the command. At first, recruitment was slow, and R and S Btys were not formed until December 1952. The only equipment available for training was the 6-inch guns at Ness Battery, near Stromness, and some twin 6-pdrs. By 1950 a decision had been made to equip some light semi-mobile batteries of coast artillery with the versatile 3.7-inch heavy anti-aircraft gun, which Q Bty trained to operate. By 1954, the regiment was training exclusively on the 3.7-inch gun, including 'landward firing' in a field artillery role.

When the coast artillery branch of the RA was abolished on 31 October 1956, the regiment converted to the light anti-aircraft role and was reduced into 861 (Orkney & Zetland) Independent Light Anti-Aircraft Battery, RA, with its HQ and two Troops at Lerwick, one Troop and the pipe band on Orkney. It trained on the modern L/70 version of the Bofors 40 mm gun, with the associated radar at Lerwick.

On 1 May 1961, the battery was incorporated into 540 (Lovat Scouts) LAA Rgt, becoming Q (Orkney & Zetland) Bty.

== Traditions ==
From 1947 to 1956, the regiment wore a regimental flash consisting of a small red fouled anchor on a blue disc, derived from the wartime insignia of OSDEF. This was formally authorised in September 1952.

430 Regiment formed a pipe band in 1955, which was officially authorised in 1956 for 861 Bty (the only battery/company/squadron sized unit to be permitted a band). With the permission of Sir Charles Maclean, the band wore Dress Maclean tartan.

Major Sir Basil Neven-Spence, Lord Lieutenant of Shetland, served as Honorary Colonel of 430 Regiment for several years. Unusually for a battery/company/squadron sized unit, 861 Battery was permitted an Honorary Colonel in 1957, and Sir Basil was re-appointed to the role.

== Gallery ==
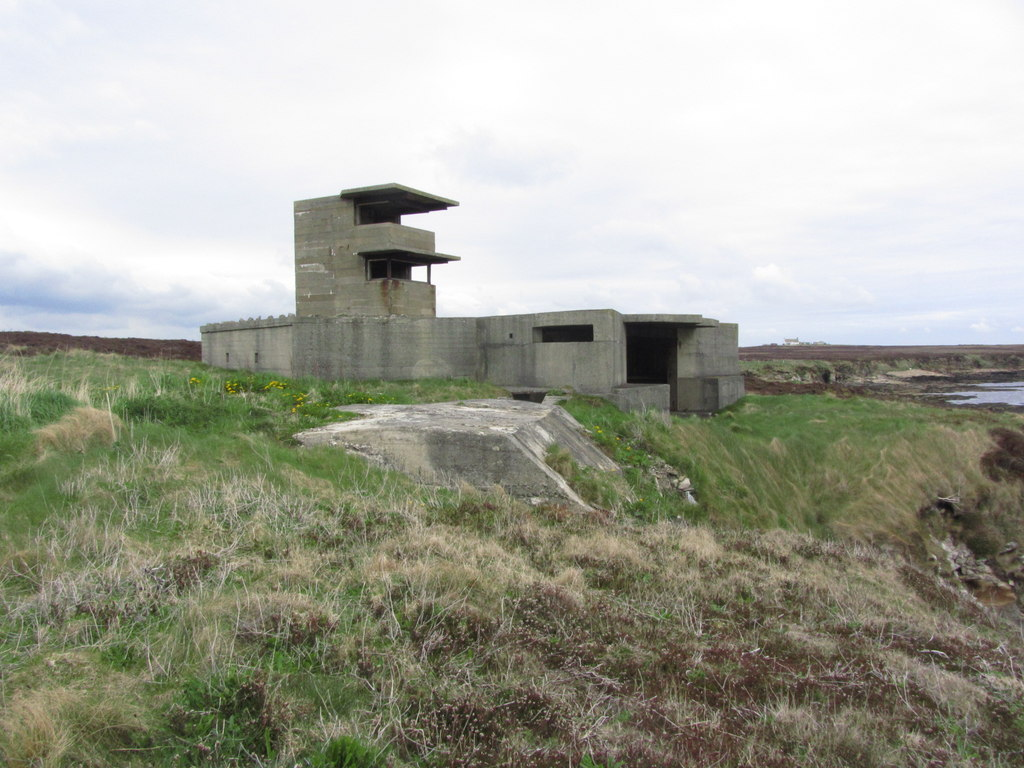
Buchanan Battery

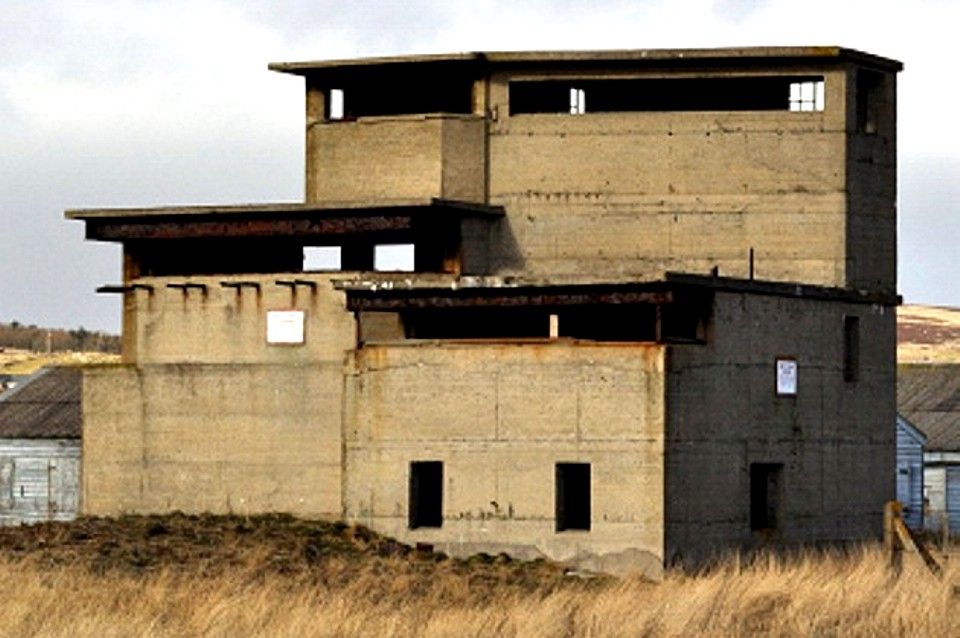
Observation post at Ness Battery, Stromness

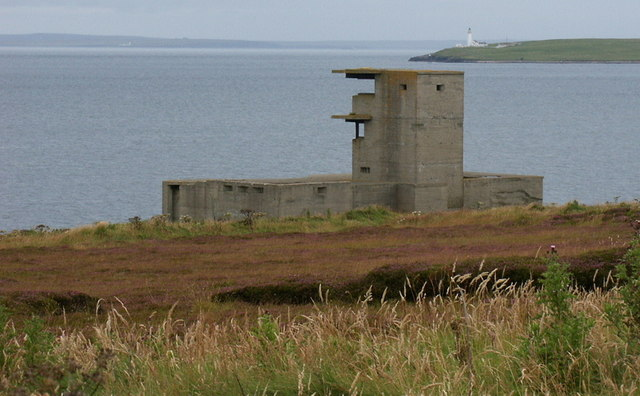
Innan Neb battery and observation tower

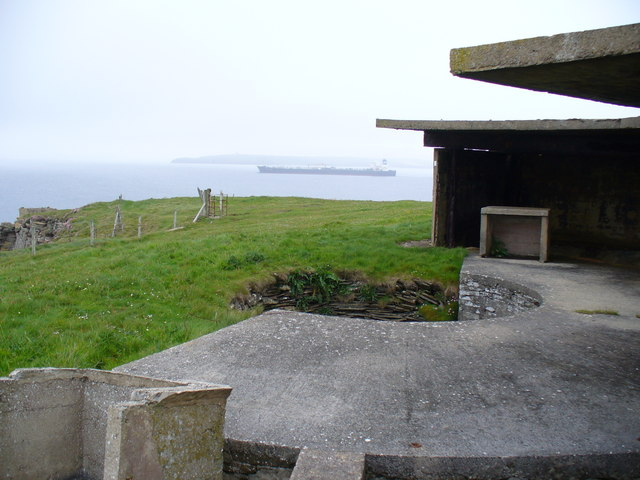
Gun emplacement overlooking the Sound of Hoxa

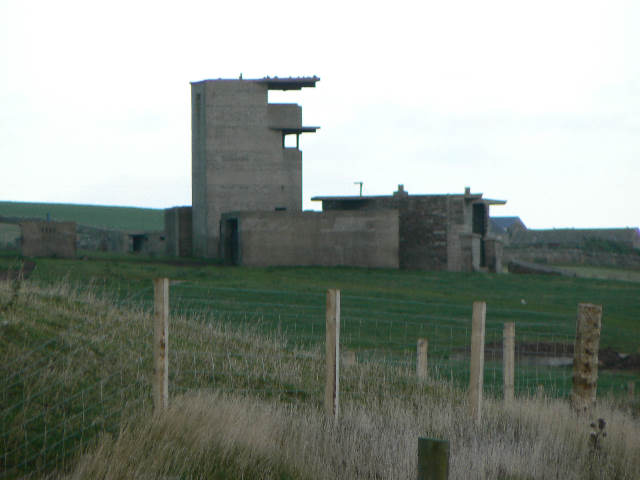
Gun emplacements at Graemeshall
