= 1st Glamorganshire Artillery Volunteers =

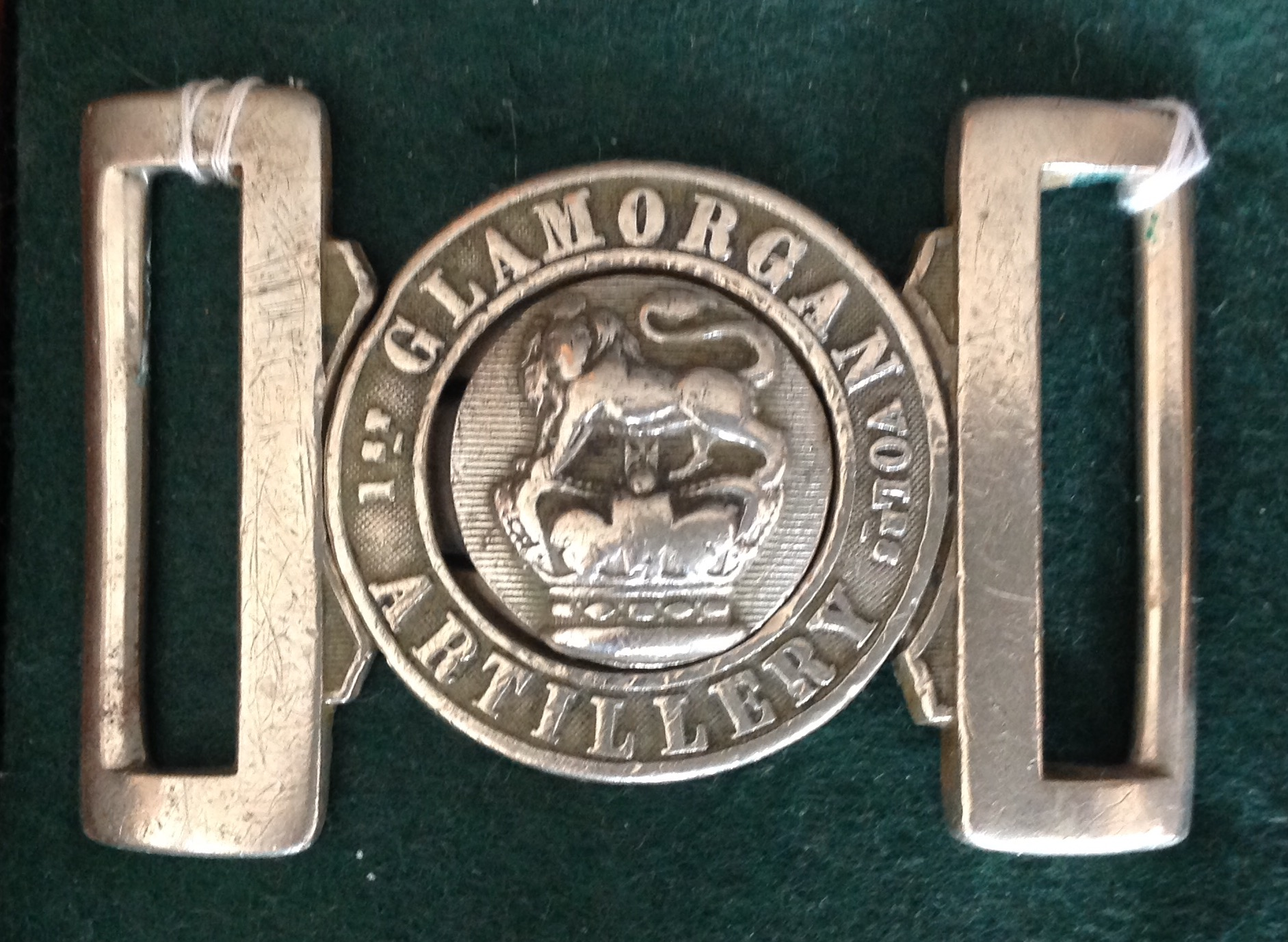
- Waistbelt clasp of the 1st Glamorganshire Artillery Volunteers, c. 1890
- Active: 1859–1961
- Country: United Kingdom
- Branch: Territorial Army
- Type: Artillery Regiment
- Role: Garrison Artillery; Field Artillery
- Garrison/HQ: Cardiff; Swansea (from 1890)

Commanders
- Colonel of the Regiment: Sir Edward Stock Hill, VD

The 1st Glamorganshire Artillery Volunteers was formed in 1859 in response to a French invasion threat. Raised as a coast artillery unit, it later became part of the Royal Field Artillery in the Territorial Force and served during both World Wars until amalgamated in 1961.

== Volunteer Force ==
The enthusiasm for the Volunteer movement following an invasion scare in 1859 saw the creation of many Volunteer Corps composed of part-time soldiers eager to supplement the Regular British Army in time of need. A number of Artillery Volunteer Corps (AVCs) were formed for coastal defence in South Wales, and by 8 November 1861 they had been consolidated into the 1st Administrative Brigade of Glamorganshire Artillery Volunteers based at Cardiff with the following components:

- 1st Corps formed at Swansea on 10 December 1859
- 2nd Corps formed at Briton Ferry on 2 June 1860
- 3rd Corps formed at Cardiff on 13 June 1860 (absorbed the 4th Corps in 1864)
- 4th Corps formed at Cardiff on 13 June 1860 (absorbed by the 3rd Corps in 1864)

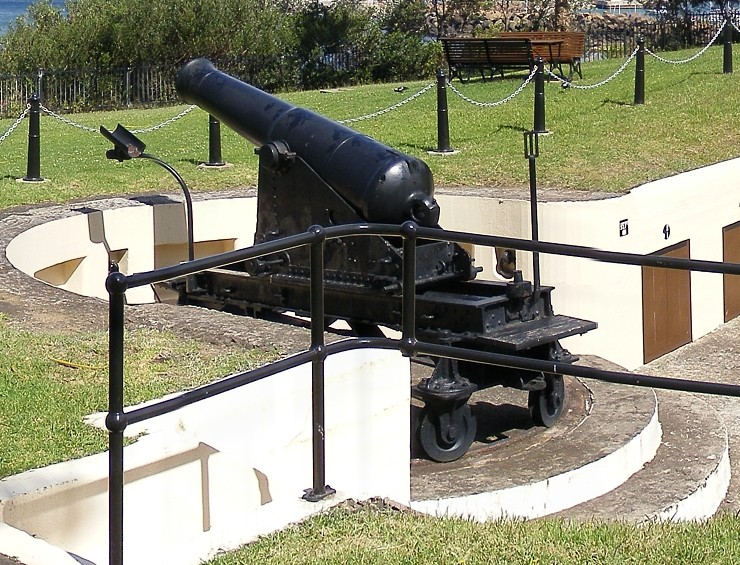
80-pounder rifled muzzle-loading cannon on traversing carriage (Smiths Hill Fort)

The 1st Glamorgan AVC at Swansea was raised by Captain George Grant Francis. The unit's initial training was given by the permanent staff of the Swansea-based Royal Glamorgan Artillery Militia (RGAM). In 1860 a pair of 18-pounder muzzle-loading cannon arrived in Swansea for the Volunteers who installed them on the Swansea Embankment. The RGAM, which had no guns of its own, were able to use them for their 1860 annual training. A proposal to mount a heavy battery for the RGAM on the salient angle of Swansea Pier was abandoned when it was found that the structure would not support its weight. In June 1861 five 68-pounder muzzle-loaders were installed in a two-tier battery at Lighthouse Island off Mumbles Point. A sergeant and five gunners of the Coast Brigade of the Royal Artillery were responsible for maintaining the battery, but its manning was the responsibility of the RGAM and the Volunteers. In the late 1870s at least two of the 68-pdrs were replaced by 80-pdr rifled muzzle-loaders (Note: Converted from 68-pdr smoothbores.) on traversing slide carriages, but financial stringency prevented any further modernisation and the battery's armament remained unchanged to the end of the 19th Century.

Captain John Hewett of the 3rd Glamorgan AVC commanded the 1st Admin Brigade as a Major, later Lieutenant-Colonel. Lieutenant-Col Hewett became the Honorary Colonel of the 1st Admin Brigade on 22 July 1864, when Maj Edward Stock Hill of the 3rd Glamorgan AVC succeeded him in command; Capt Francis of the 1st Glamorgan AVC had previously been promoted as second major of the brigade on 6 May 1864 and became second lt-col on 27 April 1868.

Also attached to the Admin Brigade were the 1st Glamorgan Light Horse Volunteers (formed at Cardiff 15 February 1861, disbanded 1873) and the 1st Monmouthshire AVC at Newport (attached from 1864 to 1866).

In May 1880 the Corps were consolidated as the 1st Glamorganshire Artillery Volunteer Corps with 17 batteries provided by the following Corps:

- Number 1, 2, 3 batteries (Swansea) by the 1st Corps
- Number 4 battery (Morriston) by the 1st Corps
- Number 5 battery (Briton Ferry) by the 2nd Corps
- Number 6 battery (Skewen) by the 2nd Corps
- Number 7 battery (Neath) by the 2nd Corps
- Number 8-14 batteries (Cardiff) by the 3rd Corps
- Number 15 battery (Bridgend) by the 3rd Corps
- Number 16 and 17 batteries (Penarth) by the 3rd Corps

In 1890 the unit's headquarters was moved to Swansea from Cardiff and the Cardiff batteries were detached to form a new 2nd Glamorganshire AVC as a separate unit. The commanding officer (CO), Sir Edward Stock Hill, Member of Parliament for Bristol South, first appointed on 22 July 1864, remained Lieutenant-Colonel Commandant of both units, though each had its own lieutenant-colonel and Honorary Colonel.

The Glamorganshire Artillery Volunteers formed part of the Welsh Division of the Royal Artillery (RA) from 1882 until 1889 when they were absorbed into the Western Division. By 1893 the War Office Mobilisation Scheme had allocated the 1st Glamorgan Artillery Volunteers to the defences at Milford Haven. In 1899 the artillery volunteers became part of the Royal Garrison Artillery (RGA). On 1 January 1902 the RGA's divisional structure was abolished, and the unit at Swansea was designated the 1st Glamorganshire RGA (Volunteers).

== Territorial Force ==
When the Volunteer Force was subsumed into the new Territorial Force (TF) under the Haldane Reforms of 1908, the 1st Glamorganshire RGA (V) transferred to the Royal Field Artillery with the following organisation:

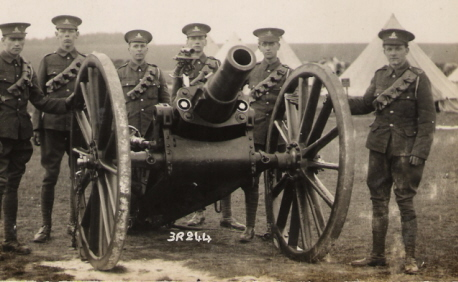
Territorial gunners training with a 5-inch howitzer before the First World War

1st Welsh (Howitzer) Brigade RFA

- HQ at Park Road Drill Hall, Swansea
- 1st Glamorgan (Howitzer) Battery at Swansea
- 2nd Glamorgan (Howitzer) Battery at Vere Street, Briton Ferry
- 1st Welsh Ammunition Column at Banwell Street, Morriston

The unit was the senior field artillery brigade in the TF's Welsh Division, and was equipped with 5-inch breechloading howitzers.

== World War I ==
=== Mobilisation ===
After the order to mobilise was received on 4 August 1914, the units of the Welsh Division assembled at their drill halls. The 1st Welsh Brigade mobilised at Swansea under the command of a regular officer, Major (Temporary Lt-Col, TF) J. Henry.

By 11 August the Welsh units had completed their concentration and TF members were invited to volunteer for Overseas Service. Four days later the War Office (WO) issued instructions to separate those men who had signed up for Home Service only, and form these into reserve units. Then on 31 August the formation of a reserve or 2nd Line unit was authorised for each 1st Line unit where 60 per cent or more of the men had volunteered for Overseas Service. The titles of these 2nd Line units would be the same as the original, but distinguished by a '2/' prefix. In this way duplicate batteries, brigades and divisions were created, mirroring those TF formations being sent overseas.

=== 1/I Welsh Brigade, RFA ===
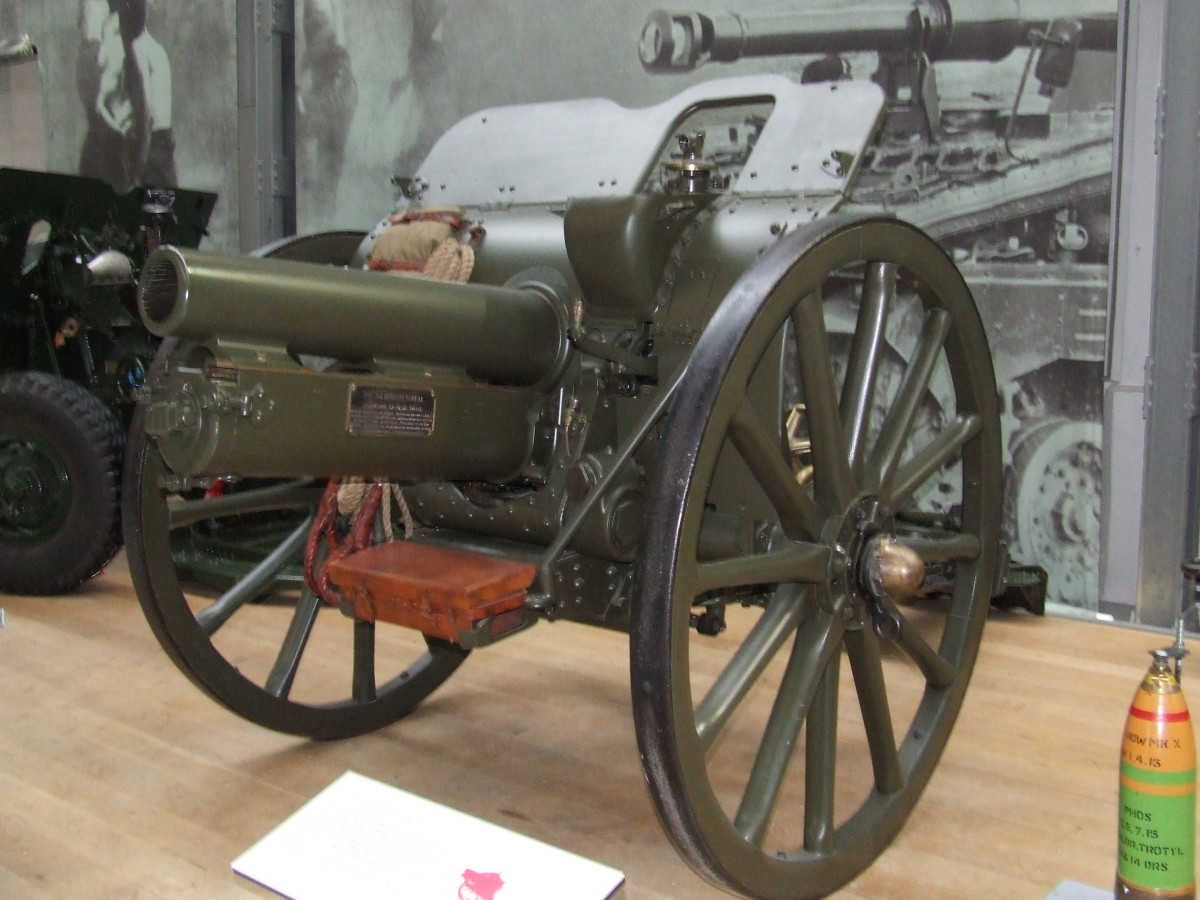
4.5-inch howitzer preserved at the Royal Artillery Museum

At the end of August the Welsh Division concentrated at Northampton to continue its training. On 18 November the division was warned for garrison duty in India, but this was cancelled and in December it moved to Cambridge, then to Bedford in May 1915. In July the infantry of the division (now renamed the 53rd (Welsh) Division) embarked for service at Gallipoli, but the divisional artillery remained at Bedford. In October the batteries were re-armed with modern 4.5-inch howitzers and on 8 November they handed over their obsolescent 5-inch howitzers to their 2nd Line unit, which had just arrived at Bedford.

53rd (Welsh) Divisional Artillery was now ordered to France to join the British Expeditionary Force (BEF) on the Western Front. It embarked on 20 November and had concentrated at Pont-Remy by 25 November, from where parties were sent to various divisional artilleries for instruction in front line duties.

Meanwhile, after suffering appalling casualties at Gallipoli, 53rd (Welsh) Division had been withdrawn to Egypt to refit. On 30 January 1916 the divisional artillery was ordered to rejoin the rest of the division. The batteries entrained at Pont-Remy, embarked at Marseille on 3 February and disembarked at Alexandria on 11 February. By 22 February the artillery had rejoined the division at Beni Salama. For the rest of the year the recuperating division was stationed in the Suez Canal defences.

In May 1916 the TF field brigades were numbered, the 1st Welsh being designated CCLXV (265) Brigade, RFA, and the batteries became A and B. Then on 25 December 1916 the divisional artillery was reorganised: A (1/1st Glamorgan) (H) Bty became C (H) Bty in CCLXVII (1/Cheshire) Bde, which took over the number CCLXV, while B (1/2nd Glamorgan) (H) Bty became C (H) Bty in CCLXVI (1/II Welsh) Bde; the Brigade Ammunition Column was absorbed into the Divisional Ammunition Column.

Both batteries fought with their new brigades throughout the Sinai and Palestine Campaign of 1917–18, including the Battles of Gaza, the Fall of Jerusalem, and the final victory at Megiddo.

=== 2/I Welsh Brigade, RFA ===
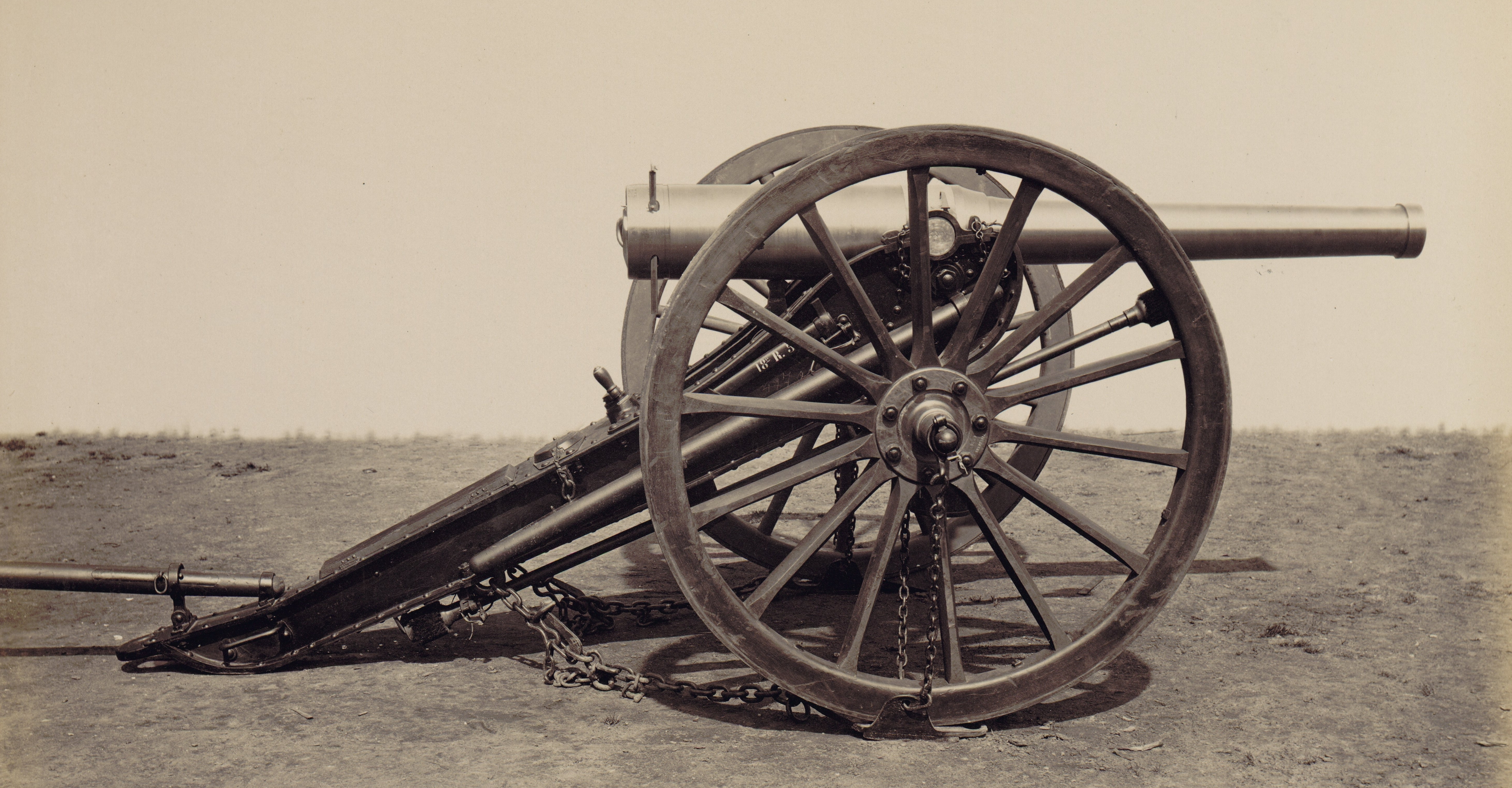
De Bange 90 mm French field gun issued to 2nd Line batteries

Although formation of the 2nd Line units began in September 1914, the 2nd Welsh Division (68th (2nd Welsh) Division from August 1915) did not concentrate at Northampton until April 1915, moving in the summer to replace the 53rd (Welsh) Division at Bedford. Training of the units was made difficult by the lack of arms and equipment, and the requirement to provide drafts to the 1st Line overseas. In June the first saddlery and horses began to arrive, but no guns until August, when the brigade received four French De Bange 90 mm guns. Some ammunition wagons arrived in September, and eight more 90 mm guns in October. Training began to speed up. In November the 90 mm guns were handed in, and the brigade moved to Bedford to take over the 5-inch howitzers from the 1st Line.

68th (2nd Welsh) Division was now assigned a role in Home Defence and joined First Army (Home Forces) in Central Force, with its units quartered across Eastern England. In May 1916 the brigade was numbered CCCXL (340) Brigade and the batteries became A and B. However, like the 1st Line brigade, it was broken up before the end of 1916 to provide howitzer batteries to the field gun brigades: A (2/1 Glamorgan) (H) Bty went to CCCXLII (2/Cheshire) and B (2/2 Glamorgan) (H) Bty went to CCCXLIII (2/IV Welsh). They continued to serve with these brigades in Home Defence in Norfolk and Suffolk until the end of the war.

== Interwar ==
The 1st Welsh Brigade, RFA, was reformed in the 53rd (W) Division on 7 February 1920 with 1st, 2nd and 3rd Glamorgan Batteries (the 3rd being transferred from the 2nd Welsh Brigade). It was redesignated the 81st (Welsh) Brigade, RFA, when the TF was reorganised as the Territorial Army (TA) in 1921 (becoming a Field Brigade, RA, in 1924 when the RFA was subsumed into the Royal Artillery). At the same time it absorbed the Glamorgan Yeomanry giving the following organisation:

- HQ at Drill Hall, Swansea, later at Drill Hall, Port Talbot
- 321 (Glamorgan) Field Bty (Howitzer) at Drill Hall, Swansea
- 322 (Glamorgan) Field Bty at Drill Hall, Neath
- 323 (Glamorgan) Field Bty at Drill Hall, Port Talbot
- 324 (Glamorgan Yeomanry) Field Bty at Drill Hall, Bridgend

The brigade, including the newly converted yeomanry, held its first brigade training camp at Porthmadog in August 1921, and attended the first postwar divisional camp at Aberystwyth in the summer of 1922. In 1925 the divisional camp was held on the Isle of Man giving the brigade experience in embarking and disembarking guns and equipment.

The establishment of a TA divisional artillery brigade was four 6-gun batteries, three equipped with 18-pounders and one with 4.5-inch howitzers, all of World War I patterns. However, the batteries only held four guns in peacetime. The guns and their first-line ammunition wagons were still horsedrawn and the battery staffs were mounted. Partial mechanisation was carried out from 1927, at first with tractors, then with Fordson lorries, but the guns retained iron-tyred wheels until pneumatic tyres began to be introduced just before World War II.

In 1938 the RA modernised its nomenclature and a lieutenant-colonel's command was designated a 'regiment' rather than a 'brigade'; this applied to TA field brigades from 1 November 1938.

In 1938 the RA also adopted a new organisation for field artillery regiments, changing from four six-gun batteries to an establishment of two batteries, each of three four-gun troops. 81st (Welsh) Fd Rgt began this process by combining 321 and 322 Fd Btys into 321 Fd Bty, and 323 and 324 Fd Btys to form a new 322 Fd Bty. However, this arrangement was short-lived, because the TA was doubled in size after the Munich Crisis of 1938, and most regiments split to form duplicates in 1939 before the outbreak of World War II. For 81st (Field) Rgt this resulted in the following organisation from 8 May 1939:

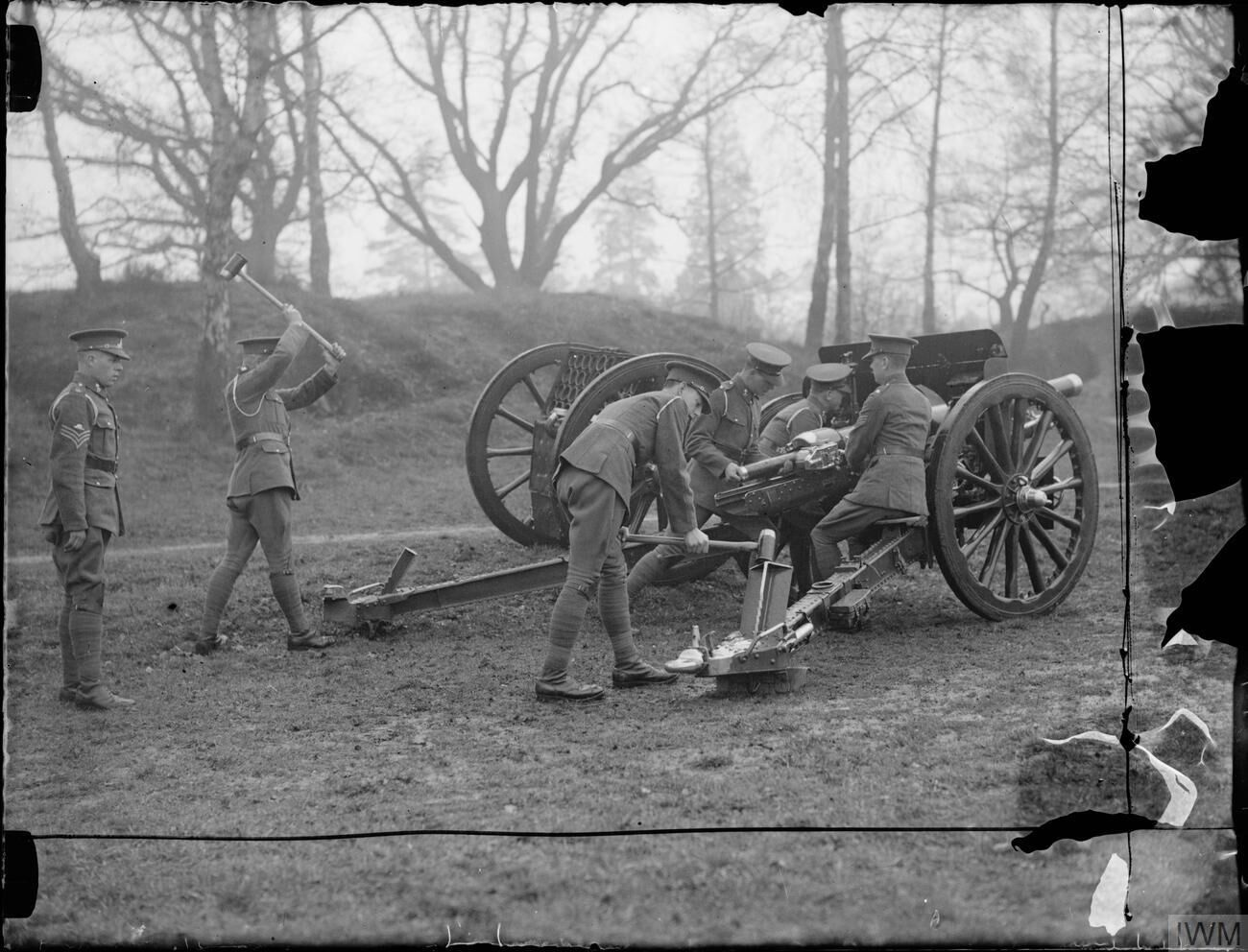
Emplacing an 18-pounder with wooden wheels at the start of World War II

81st (Welsh) Field Regiment, RA

- RHQ at Port Talbot
- 323 (Glamorgan) Field Bty at Port Talbot
- 324 (Glamorgan Yeomanry) Field Bty at Bridgend

132nd Field Regiment, RA

- RHQ at Neath
- 321 (Glamorgan) Field Bty at Swansea
- 322 (Glamorgan) Field Bty at Neath

== World War II ==
=== Mobilisation ===
Annual camp for the regiment was held at Malvern in the summer of 1939, where the details of the split into two regiments were settled. The TA was mobilised on 1 September 1939, just before the outbreak of war. 81st Field Rgt remained part of 53rd (Welsh) Division, while 132nd was assigned to the duplicate 38th (Welsh) Infantry Division, which became active on 18 September 1939.

=== 81st (Welsh) Field Regiment ===
==== Home defence ====
On mobilisation 81st Field Rgt moved into billets at Gorseinon in West Glamorgan. Six weeks later it moved to Pembroke, where a number of men were withdrawn and sent back to key civilian jobs. They were replaced by a draft of militiamen. Parts of 53rd (Welsh) Division were sent to Northern Ireland from October 1939, and 81st Fd Rgt joined it there in March 1940, being quartered first at Ballymoney and later at Kilkeel. By 3 April the whole division was stationed in Northern Ireland as part of VI Corps.

One of the lessons learned from the Battle of France was that the two-battery organisation did not work: field regiments were intended to support an infantry brigade of three battalions. As a result, they were reorganised into three 8-gun batteries, each of two four-gun troops of 25-pounders with Quad gun tractors. By December 1940 81st (Welsh) Fd Rgt reorganised as A, B and C Btys, and on 14 January 1941 these were numbered as 323, 324 and 459 Fd Btys. The additional men for 459 Fd Bty came from disbanded Defence Regiments of the RA.

53rd (W) Division returned to mainland Britain on 30 April 1941, the division served under III Corps and Western Command in the Welsh Border counties. In April 1942 it was assigned to XII Corps District, and concentrated in Kent, with 81st Fd Rgt moving to Sutton Valence near Maidstone on 1 April. From 15 May 1943 53rd (W) Division in XII Corps became part of 21st Army Group training for the Allied invasion of Normandy (Operation Overlord). 81st Field Rgt moved into Suffolk in August, returning to Sutton Valence the following month. In October it moved into the permanent barracks at Sheerness where it was attached to 71 Infantry Brigade, which had just joined 53rd (W) Division. The regiment was to support 71 Bde in the forthcoming campaign, with the batteries allotted as follows:

- 323 Fd Bty – 1st Battalion, Oxfordshire and Buckinghamshire Light Infantry (OBLI)
- 324 Fd Bty – 1st Battalion, East Lancashire Regiment
- 459 Fd Bty – 1st Battalion, Highland Light Infantry (HLI)

==== Normandy ====
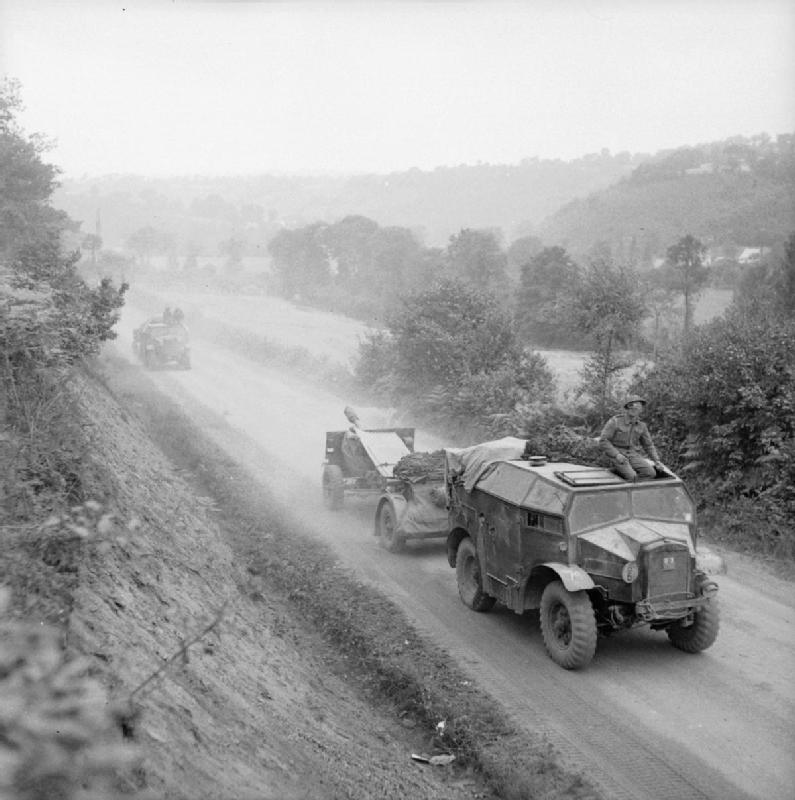
25-pounders and Quad tractors advancing in Normandy August 1944

53rd (Welsh) Division was among the follow-up troops landing after D-Day (6 June). Between 15 and 17 June 81st Fd Rgt moved to Marshalling Camp 2 at Canning Town, close to London Docks. Embarkation commenced on 19 June, 342 Fd Bty at Royal Albert Dock, the rest of the regiment at East India Docks and Royal Victoria Dock. Their ships joined a convoy off Sheerness on 24 June and the regiment under the command of Lt-Col A.W. Tyler had landed in Normandy and was concentrated with other units of the division in the Subles district south of Bayeux on 27 June.

On 1 July 53rd (W) Division relieved 15th (Scottish) Division on the River Odon after the Battle of 'Scottish Corridor'. 53rd Division was then involved in the Second Battle of the Odon from 15 July, 71 Bde capturing Cahier and holding on to it by hard fighting. In early August, fearing heavy casualties among the units of a single recruiting area, 53rd (W) Division dispersed the battalions of Royal Welch Fusiliers (RWF) comprising 158 Infantry Brigade and 4th BN RWF was transferred to 71 Bde, with 342 Fd Bty affiliated to it. On 3 August 71 Bde planned two battalion-sized raids. 81st Field Rgt was to have fired two smokescreens for Operation Bayonet, but it was cancelled. It did fire in support of Operation Bugle, but that was called off soon after it launched because the German mortar fire was too heavy and the infantry withdrew.

When the breakout from the Normandy beachhead began in early August, 53rd Division cleared the banks of the River Orne as far as Grimbosq and Thury-Harcourt and then fought its way towards Falaise to help in closing the Falaise Pocket. On 13/14 August 71 Bde made a night advance and at midday on 14 August 4th RWF was ordered to continue the advance to Point 240, south-east of Bonnœil. The battalion was accompanied y the battery commander and two Forward Observation Officers (FOOs) from 342 Fd Bty, who brought down defensive fire (DF) when the battalion was subjected to attacks by tanks, infantry and artillery; it held the position thanks to the effective DF. On 17 August 71 Bde attacked Le Mesnil-Villement, Houx and Point 244 supported by a fireplan involving the whole divisional artillery. The attack was successful and the fireplan described as 'immaculate'. 1st OBLI then followed up with an attack on Pointed 241 and 262. Next day the division had its Observation Posts (OPs) overlooking Ronai and Habloville and the killing ground 'Serpent' where German forces were fleeing through the narrowing Falaise Gap. The guns fired 'Uncle' (all guns in the division) and then 'Victor' (all guns in the corps) targets steadily throughout the day on the enemy escape routes. The situation was chaotic: three gunners of 81st Fd Rgt driving back to collect ammunition were misdirected into an apparently deserted village where they found and captured three Germans. Driving out, the Germans warned them of mines, so they dismounted and cleared the mines from the road under fire from Germans still in the village. They then handed over their prisoners to the nearest infantry before collected the ammunition for their battery.

By late August 53rd (W) Division's units were across the Seine and driving over open country towards the River Somme. On 4 September the division cleared St Pol and was working its way through the canal area west of Lille.

==== Netherlands ====
There was a pause at the Meuse-Escaut Canal before Operation Market Garden was launched on 17 September. XII Corps had an important subsidiary role clearing the country west of XXX Corps' main thrust. 81st Field Rgt crossed the canal on 19 September and went into action supporting the advance of 71 Bde. There was particularly at Wintelre, west of Eindhoven, which the Germans held for two days, with the regiment firing several barrages and taking some casualties from return fire. The divisional artillery's flank was open, and had to be protected by a company from the divisional reconnaissance regiment; around 50 Germans were taken prisoner within the regiment's gun lines. Afterwards the guns fired frequent Harassing Fire (HF) tasks as the enemy slowly withdrew in front of 53rd Division. On 7 October, the regiment moved into the Nijmegen bridgehead captured during Market Garden. While at Nijmegen one FOO was killed, and the regiment's CO, Lt-Col Tyler, was wounded and evacuated.

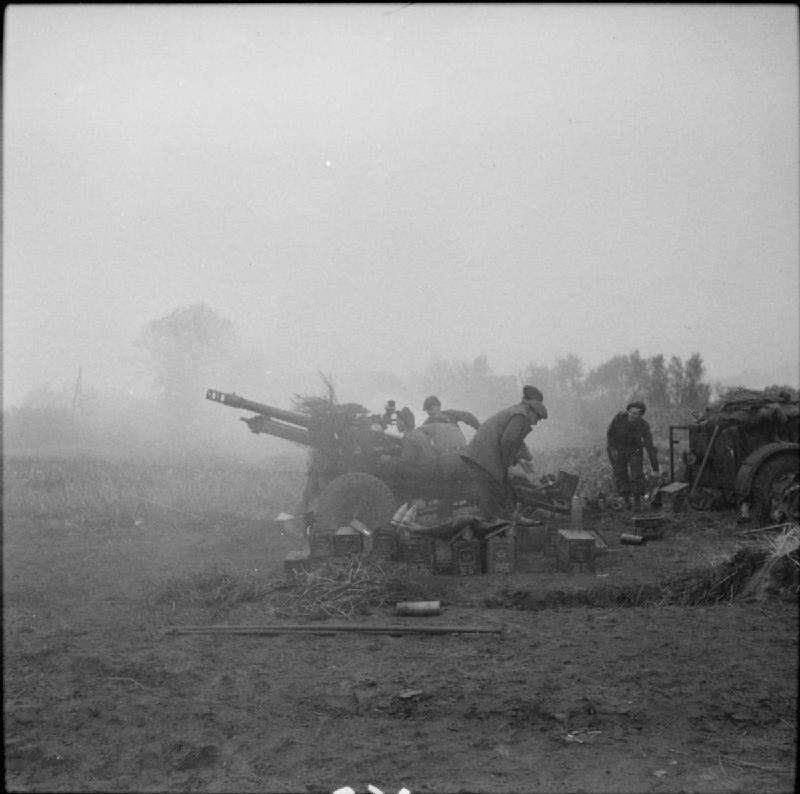
25-pounders in action during the advance on 's-Hertogenbosch, 23 October 1944

After the failure of Market Garden, XII Corps was ordered to advance westwards towards 's-Hertogenbosch. 81st Field Rgt left Nijmegen on 18 October and took up its new gun positions by midnight on 20 October. The regiment had to provide its own patrols because there were no infantry between the guns and the enemy – the attacking infantry only moved up at the last moment. Lieutenant-Col R.V. Hills took over as CO on 20 October, and the next day Major R.J.H. Lloyd, who had been in temporary command, was wounded. The attack on s'Hertogenbosch (Operation Alan) began at 06.30 on 22 October, the infantry of 71 Bde advancing behind a timed programme fired by the guns. The regiment also fired at preselected targets on call, and fired coloured smoke to indicate targets for the Royal Air Force (RAF). The infantry made slow progress, but by the end of 23 October 71 Bde was nearing its objectives. Next day 81st Field Rgt fired in support of a fresh attack by 158 Brigade, which went well as the division fought its way into the outskirts of the town; it took two more days of house-to-house fighting to clear the old town, while the artillery fired HF tasks on the Germans' escape routes.

Next XII Corps was switched to clearing the country between the Wessem-Nederweert Canal and the Zig Canal as 21st Army Group closed up to the River Maas. 81st Field Rgt moved to Wessem with 71 Bde on 1 November to relieve the Independent Belgian Brigade on the canal line. On 9 November the FOO with 1st HLI and his signaller were captured by an enemy patrol as they went OP before first light. When the regiment moved to south of Weert, there was no infantry protection in front, and enemy patrols set off tripwire flares close by. On 14 November the division crossed the canal (Operation Mallard) with support from the guns, and on 16 November the regiment struggled across the temporary bridges with 71 Bde, ending the day in front of the defended locality of Roermond. 71 Brigade attempted an assault crossing of the River Maas towards Roermond on the night of 21/22 November. Bridging operations were held up until the divisional artillery was able to suppress the German guns. 4th Battalion Royal Welsh Fusiliers, supported only by 81st Fd Rgt, made several abortive attempts to cross the anti-tank ditch, but 1st OBLI succeeded, aided by a smokescreen fired by 81st Fd Rgt.

==== Operation Veritable ====
Further operations were halted by winter weather. 71 Brigade Group including 81st Fd Rgt went for rest in Bocholt, Belgium. In December the regiment was required to transfer 25 of its men to the infantry to make up for losses in the campaign so far. On 20 January 1945 the division moved to the Eindhoven area to refit and train for a special operation. On the night of 4/5 February the regiment moved its guns into concealed positions near Groesbeek, while the rest of the men were confined to barracks in Nijmegen and the divisional signs on vehicles were painted over.

The Battle of the Reichswald (Operation Veritable) opened at 05.00 on 8 February with the heaviest concentration of artillery employed by the British Army so far in the war. The bombardment hit enemy gun positions, HQs, and communications. After a pause and dummy attack at 07.40 to induce the Germans to man their guns, the Counter-battery fire was resumed and a barrage was laid down to protect the assaulting columns. At 10.30 the full barrage made its first lift and the advance began. 81st Field Rgt fired in support of 71 Bde as usual. 53rd Division's objectives were the Brandenburg and Stoppelberg features in the northern part of the Reichswald. Opposition was not strong but the terrain was difficult. By 02.00 on 9 February the leading units were through the Siegfried Line defences and closing on the Stoppelberg. That feature was taken during the morning and the division pushed on to the edge of the forest, but it was hard to get guns and vehicles along the muddy forest tracks. 81st Field Rgt reported that the second-in-command's OP tank had to be used to tow out bogged guns and tractors ('its only use; in all other respects it was an infernal nuisance'). It took several days for the division to push on through Pfalzdorf towards Goch, mopping up opposition and fending off counter-attacks. Goch fell on 21 February.

53rd (W) Division was not involved in the assault crossing of the Rhine (Operation Plunder) on 23/24 March, but crossed on 26 March and the next day attacked through Hamminkeln to Dingden. It then took part in the drive to the Elbe. 81st Field Rgt entered Hamburg early on 4 May, the day that the German surrender at Lüneburg Heath, ending the fighting on 21st Army Group's front. The regiment handed in its guns on 30 May and converted to an infantry role with the occupation forces.

81st (Welsh) Field Regiment was placed in suspended animation on 24 June 1946.

=== 132nd (Welsh) Field Regiment ===
==== Home defence ====
38th (Welsh) Division underwent training through the winter of 1939–40 in South-East Wales as part of Western Command. Training was hindered by the lack of equipment. After the British Expeditionary Force was evacuated from Dunkirk, the divisions at home under training only had about six World War I-era guns apiece. On 15 July the division joined III Corps, part of the Mobile Force stationed in Wales and NW England.

From Spring 1941 the division was in Southern England as IV Corps' Reserve, stationed behind 47th (London) and 55th (West Lancashire) Infantry Division along the Sussex Coast. The regiment formed its third battery, 496 Fd Bty, on 31 March when it was stationed at Aldershot. 38th Division's Commander, Royal Artillery (CRA), Brigadier H.J. Parham, developed techniques for concentrating large numbers of guns onto a single target in a very short time, and demonstrated them on the artillery ranges at Larkhill on Salisbury Plain. When the three-battery establishment was introduced in 1941, 132nd Fd Rgt formed 496 Fd Bty.

132nd Field Rgt was authorised to use its parent unit's 'Welsh' subtitle on 17 February 1942. It left 38th Division on 15 July 1942, when it joined 78th Division. This was a new formation being assembled from disparate units for First Army in preparation for the Allied invasion of North Africa (Operation Torch).

==== Operation Torch ====
78th 'Battleaxe' Division's insignia

11 Infantry Brigade Group from 78th Division, including 132nd Fd Rgt, landed in the first wave of Operation Torch. Forward Observation Officers from the artillery accompanied the two assault battalions as they landed on 'Apples Green' and 'Apples White' beaches near Algiers. After landing and consolidating the beachhead, they were to capture Blida Airfield and secure the roads around Birtouta. The landings began exactly on time at 01.00 on 8 November 1942, met no opposition from the Vichy French, and the whole brigade group was ashore before 12.00. It was in position around Birtouta by nightfall.

11 Brigade Group began the march towards Tunis (500 miles (800 km) distant) on 15 November as the first support troops began unloading at Algiers docks and the air forces began operating the airfields. The group's attack on Medjez el Bab on 25 November failed, but other forces bypassed it and the brigade occupied it the next day and pushed on for Tebourba, only about 20 miles (32 km) from Tunis. Early on 27 November, 1st Battalion East Surrey Regiment was widely extended in front of Tebourba when it was attacked by the hastily formed German Kampfgruppe Lüder. The Surreys suffered heavy casualties and 322 Bty supporting them lost all eight of its guns. The division was involved in bitter defence for the Tebourba Gap against German attacks on 1–3 December, and another bitter battle round Longstop Hill on 22–24 December.

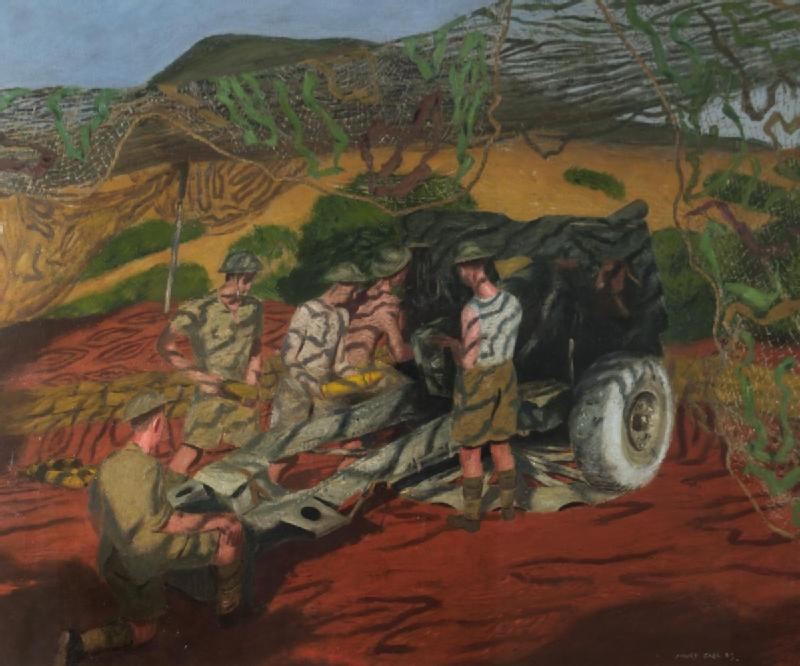
A Camouflaged 25-pounder Gun in Action near Medjez-el-Bab, by Henry Carr

The renewed Allied offensive in Tunisia began on 8 April 1943 with operations to open the Oued Zarga–Medjez road. For 78th Divisions' attack on Chaouach and Toukabeur the divisional artillery was joined by all the heavy artillery and the foothills were captured without much difficulty; both villages had been taken and an advance of 10 miles (16 km) made by the end of the following day. On 14 April the division attacked the hills overlooking Longstop Hill, in four days of hard fighting, but could not hold the final hill, Tanngoucha. On 23 April it attacked Longstop and Tanngoucha again (the Second Battle of Longstop Hill), despite an army-wide shortage of 25-pounder ammunition. This time the positions were taken and held after several days of fighting. 78th Division was then positioned for a direct drive on Tunis (Operation Vulcan). This was launched by IX Corps, supported by all the guns of V Corps including 78th Division. The operation was launched on the evening of 5 May and extended the following day. The weight of artillery fire was immense, with all the guns averaging 368 rounds per gun in the first 24 hours, and the infantry made steady progress. Tunis fell on 7 May and all remaining Axis forces in Tunisia surrendered by 13 May.

==== Sicily ====
78th Division had been selected for the Allied invasion of Sicily (Operation Husky) as early as January 1943, and after the end of the Tunisian campaign went into training at Hammamet. It was assigned to Eighth Army as a reserve formation for the operation, which began with assault landings on 10 July. 78th Division embarked on 23 July and landed on the beaches near Cassibile between 25 and 28 July. It began moving into its concentration area south of Monte Scalpello on 26 July and completed its concentration on 30 July, just in time to participate in the Battle of Centuripe.

Large amounts of 25-pounder ammunition had been gathered for this operation. 78th Division's task was first to relieve 3rd Canadian Infantry Brigade across the Dittaino river at Catenanuova and expand the bridgehead, then to capture the hill town of Centuripe. The division began the movement promptly, and began the attack on Centuripe a day early. The divisional artillery deployed wherever it could find positions along the road; as the Official Historian commented: 'In Sicily there grew up the art, further developed in Italy of placing field and medium guns in positions which would have been seen in earlier days, as freakish'. The initial advance across 'immensely difficult terrain' was accomplished, but then there was bitter fighting for the town itself. On the afternoon of 2 August the division's reserve, 38 (Irish) Bde was sent in, supported by 132nd Fd Rgt and the rest of the divisional and corps artillery. The town was cleared by first light the next day.

78th Division was then sent round the west side of Mount Etna. 38 (Irish) Brigade crossed the Salso on 4 August and the Simeto on 5 August, with strong artillery support. German resistance then stiffened, and 78th Division had to put in a full-scale attack at Bronte and Maletto before capturing the key point of Randazzo on 13 August. By now the Germans were evacuating Sicily, and the division was ordered to stand fast.

==== Italy ====
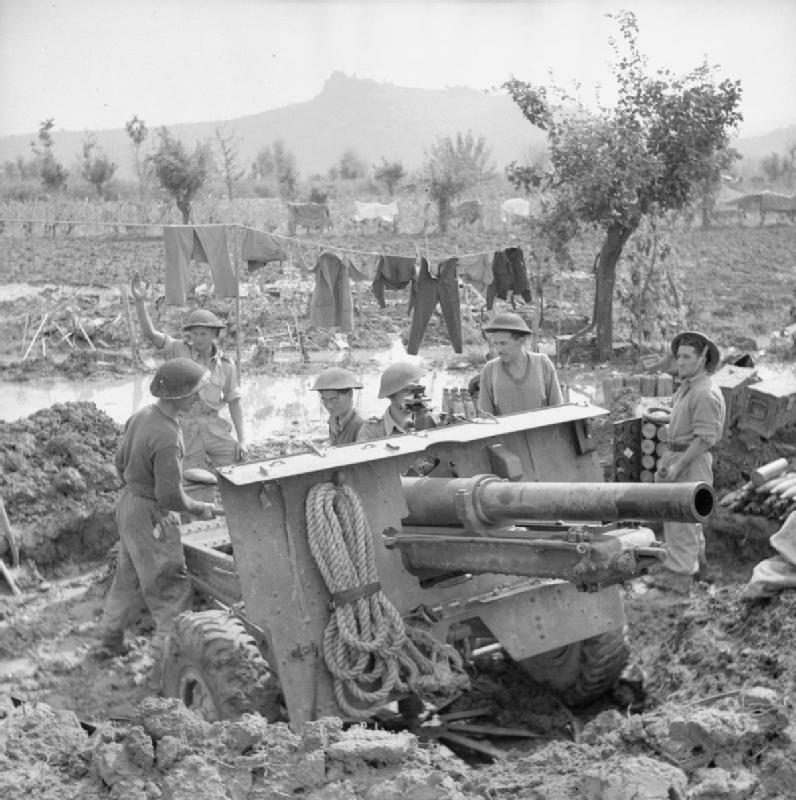
25-pounder and crew in a waterlogged position in Italy, October 1944

The Allies landed on mainland Italy in early September 1943. 78th Division began to arrive on 22 September, and immediately began advancing towards Foggia and its important complex of airfields. Next, it was sent to cross the Biferno and capture Termoli, with two brigades sent round the coast by landing craft and one wading across the river on 3 October. Unfortunately, heavy rain the next day made the river impassable, just when a counter-attack by Panzers was developing. The situation was dangerous on 5 October until Royal Engineers completed a bridge for tanks and guns to get across in support, after which the advance was resumed.

At the end of October 78th Division was ordered to capture Vasto and the high ground beyond, but rain and mud bedevilled preparations. The division seized Vineyard Hill on 3 November and the enemy began to withdraw that night. By 9 November the division had reached the Sangro, which formed part of the Germans' Bernhardt Line. Patrols could cross the river, but a fullscale operation was needed to establish a bridgehead. Despite the weather the Royal Engineers repaired roads and built bridges. When the weather abated the 6th Royal Inniskilling Fusiliers of 38 Bde broke out of the bridgehead and captured Santa Maria on 29 November, supported by all the divisional artillery and a number of other regiments. Next day the brigade swept down the Li Colli ridge to Fossacesia, and took Rocca on 1 December. In the first three days of the Battle of the Sangro, the field regiments fired over 600 rounds per gun. Afterwards the division was sent to rest.

Progress in the Italian campaign bogged down during the winter of 1943–4. The Allies' spring campaign in 1944 began with a renewed attempt to take Monte Cassino, and 78th Division had been moved across Italy to be in XIII Corps' reserve for this. All the field guns in the corps were involved in the preliminary bombardment and then the Creeping barrage laid on for the attacking divisions on 11/12 May. 78th Division was committed to the battle on 15 May in the Liri Valley. At first light on 19 May, 36 Bde was launched at Aquino, supported by all three regiments of field artillery and masked by mist. But when the mist cleared it became obvious that the German positions (part of the Hitler Line) were very strong and the attack had to be called off. However, the weight of artillery overwhelmed the German guns and by 25 May the leading troops of the division reached Roccasecca railway station. The Germans began to withdraw that night, and XIII Corps began a slow pursuit along Highway 6 against rearguards. 78th Division reached Alatri on 2 June and then went into reserve.

78th Division returned to the line for the Battle of Lake Trasimene, working its way up the west bank of the Tiber against strong opposition, 10–24 June, securing Pescia and its river but suffering heavy casualties. The exhausted division was then sent to the Middle East for rest and refit, embarking for Egypt on 23 July. Casualties in Eighth Army meant that the division had to return to the Italian front in the autumn, landing on 15 September. The division began assembling around Fano and then moved into the Santerno Valley, on appalling roads that even defeated the 'Quad'.

The division held Monte Cappello and Monte Battaglia, but advancing was difficult, and the capture of Monte La Pieve and Monte Spadura took from 13 to 24 October at heavy cost. Fighting on the Italian Front largely shut down for winter, but not before more abortive attacks by 78th Division in December.

78th Division returned to V Corps for the Allied Spring 1945 offensive in Italy (Operation Grapeshot). Once the Senio was crossed, 78th Division was to push through towards the Bastia Bridge on the Reno and on to Argenta. The operation was launched on 9 April behind massed artillery and went according to plan, with 78th Division clearing Cotignola and then moving into the lead. On 13 April 38 Brigade provided the break-out force of battalion groups with field artillery regiments in support. Once the Reno had been bridged, 38 Bde fought its way through and broke out once more, heading for the critical 'Argenta Gap'. By now 25-pounder ammunition was running short, but on 18 April 38 Bde cut in behind Argenta and 78th Division was leap-frogging its brigades up the Via Adriatica. Then it headed for the River Po, arriving on 22 April. After more stiff fighting, the division crossed in pursuit of the disintegrating German forces. Fighting on the Italian Front ended on 2 May after the Surrender of Caserta, and 78th Division entered Austria as part of the occupation force on 8 May 1945, advancing towards Villach and Klagenfurt.

132nd (Welsh) Field Regiment was placed in suspended animation on 31 December 1945 and formally disbanded when the TA was reformed on 1 January 1947.

== Postwar ==
When the TA was reconstituted in 1947 81st (Welsh) Fd Rgt reformed at Port Talbot as 281st (Welsh) Field Regiment in 53rd (Welsh) Division.

281st (Welsh) Rgt still had a Glamorgan Yeomanry battery, and on 30 September 1953 the regiment was redesignated 281st (Glamorgan Yeomanry) Field Regiment, effectively ending the Glamorgan Artillery Volunteers lineage. On 31 October 1956 the regiment absorbed the Glamorgan batteries of 408 (Glamorgan and Pembroke) Coast Rgt and 887 Locating Battery, which had been formed in Cardiff in 1947.

This was followed on 1 May 1961 by amalgamation with 282nd (Welsh) Heavy Anti-Aircraft Rgt and 283rd (Monmouthshire) Field Rgt to form:

282nd (Glamorgan and Monmouthshire) Field Regiment, RA

- P (Glamorgan Yeomanry) Bty – from 281st Fd Rgt
- Q (Welsh) Bty – from 282nd HAA Rgt
- R (1 Monmouth) Bty – from 283rd Fd Rgt
- 509 (Motor Transport) Company, Royal Army Service Corps (RASC) – from surplus personnel of P Bty, 281st Fd Rgt, 282nd HAA Rgt Workshop, Royal Electrical and Mechanical Engineers, and 533 Co RASC

Finally, when the TA was reduced into the TAVR in 1967, the combined regiment became 211 (South Wales) Battery, Royal Artillery at Newport in 104 Light Air Defence Regiment, with the following organisation:

- D (Monmouthshire) Troop at Newport
- E (Glamorgan Yeomanry) Troop at Cardiff
- F (Brecknockshire and Monmouthshire) Troop at Ebbw Vale

In 1986, 211 Bty provided a cadre for a new 217 (County of Gwent) Bty at Cwmbran, but this was reabsorbed by 211 Bty in 1992, when the battery was reduced to:

- C (Glamorgan Yeomanry) Troop at Cardiff
- D (Brecknockshire and Monmouthshire) Troop at Abertillery.

211 (South Wales) Bty continues in 104th Regiment Royal Artillery (Volunteers) in the Army Reserve today, currently as a close support unit equipped with the L118 light gun.

== Uniforms and insignia ==
Between 1920 and about 1938 the officers and men of 324 (Glamorgan Yeomanry) Bty continued to wear the Glamorgan Yeomanry's Welsh Dragon cap badge. As collar badges, the officers wore gilt Welsh leeks on their blue patrol jackets and bronze Prince of Wales's feathers, coronet and motto in service dress, while the other ranks wore Welsh dragon badges. During and after the Second World War, the whole of 81st and 281st Field Rgts wore RA badges, but after 1967 their successors in the Glamorgan Yeomanry Troop of 211th (South Wales) Bty in 104th Light Air Defence Rgt were allowed the dragon collar badge in No 1 uniform.

== Honorary Colonels ==
The following served as Honorary Colonel of the unit:

- Lt-Col John Hewett, former CO, appointed 22 July 1864
- John Crichton-Stuart, 3rd Marquess of Bute, appointed 4 July 1865
- Victor Child Villiers, 7th Earl of Jersey, appointed 18 June 1875, died May 1915
- Maj Archibald Douglas, 4th Baron Blythswood, MVO, appointed 20 May 1922, died 14 November 1929
- Col R.B. Benyon-Winsor, CBE, TD, former CO, appointed 28 July 1934

== Sources ==
- Maj A.F. Becke,History of the Great War: Order of Battle of Divisions, Part 2a: The Territorial Force Mounted Divisions and the 1st-Line Territorial Force Divisions (42–56), London: HM Stationery Office, 1935/Uckfield: Naval & Military Press, 2007, ISBN 1-847347-39-8.
- Maj A.F. Becke,History of the Great War: Order of Battle of Divisions, Part 2b: The 2nd-Line Territorial Force Divisions (57th–69th), with the Home-Service Divisions (71st–73rd) and 74th and 75th Divisions, London: HM Stationery Office, 1937/Uckfield: Naval & Military Press, 2007, ISBN 1-847347-39-8.
- Ian F.W. Beckett, Riflemen Form: A Study of the Rifle Volunteer Movement 1859–1908, Aldershot, The Ogilby Trusts, 1982, ISBN 0-85936-271-X.
- John Buckley, Monty's Men: The British Army and the Liberation of Europe, London: Yale University Press, 2013, ISBN 978-0-300-13449-0.
- Basil Collier, History of the Second World War, United Kingdom Military Series: The Defence of the United Kingdom, London: HM Stationery Office, 1957.
- Col John K. Dunlop, The Development of the British Army 1899–1914, London: Methuen, 1938.
- Major L.F. Ellis, History of the Second World War, United Kingdom Military Series: Victory in the West, Vol I: The Battle of Normandy, London: HM Stationery Office, 1962/Uckfield: Naval & Military, 2004, ISBN 1-845740-58-0.
- Major L.F. Ellis, History of the Second World War, United Kingdom Military Series: Victory in the West, Vol II: The Defeat of Germany, London: HM Stationery Office, 1968/Uckfield: Naval & Military, 2004, ISBN 1-845740-59-9.
- Gen Sir Martin Farndale, History of the Royal Regiment of Artillery: Western Front 1914–18, Woolwich: Royal Artillery Institution, 1986, ISBN 1-870114-00-0.
- Gen Sir Martin Farndale, History of the Royal Regiment of Artillery: The Forgotten Fronts and the Home Base 1914–18, Woolwich: Royal Artillery Institution, 1988, ISBN 1-870114-05-1.
- Gen Sir Martin Farndale, History of the Royal Regiment of Artillery: The Years of Defeat: Europe and North Africa, 1939–1941, Woolwich: Royal Artillery Institution, 1988/London: Brasseys, 1996, ISBN 1-85753-080-2.
- J.B.M. Frederick, Lineage Book of British Land Forces 1660–1978, Vol I, Wakefield: Microform Academic, 1984, ISBN 1-85117-007-3.
- J.B.M. Frederick, Lineage Book of British Land Forces 1660–1978, Vol II, Wakefield: Microform Academic, 1984, ISBN 1-85117-009-X.
- Gen Sir William Jackson, History of the Second World War, United Kingdom Military Series: The Mediterranean and Middle East, Vol VI: Victory in the Mediterranean, Part I|: June to October 1944, London: HMSO, 1987/Uckfield, Naval & Military Press, 2004, ISBN 1-845740-71-8.
- Gen Sir William Jackson, History of the Second World War, United Kingdom Military Series: The Mediterranean and Middle East, Vol VI: Victory in the Mediterranean, Part I|I: November 1944 to May 1945, London: HMSO, 1988/Uckfield, Naval & Military Press, 2004, ISBN 1-845740-72-6.
- Lt-Col H.F. Joslen, Orders of Battle, United Kingdom and Colonial Formations and Units in the Second World War, 1939–1945, London: HM Stationery Office, 1960/London: London Stamp Exchange, 1990, ISBN 0-948130-03-2/ Uckfield: Naval & Military Press, 2003, ISBN 1-843424-74-6.
- Norman E.H. Litchfield, The Territorial Artillery 1908–1988 (Their Lineage, Uniforms and Badges), Nottingham: Sherwood Press, 1992, ISBN 0-9508205-2-0.
- Norman Litchfield & Ray Westlake, The Volunteer Artillery 1859–1908 (Their Lineage, Uniforms and Badges), Nottingham: Sherwood Press, 1982, ISBN 0-9508205-0-4.
- Lt-Gen H.G. Martin, The History of the Fifteenth Scottish Division 1939–1945, Edinburgh: Blackwood, 1948/Uckfield: Naval & Military Press, 2014, ISBN 978-1-78331-085-2.
- Brig C.J.C. Molony,History of the Second World War, United Kingdom Military Series: The Mediterranean and Middle East, Vol V: The Campaign in Sicily 1943 and the Campaign in Italy 3rd September 1943 to 31st March 1944, London: HMSO, 1973/Uckfield, Naval & Military Press, 2004, ISBN 1-845740-69-6.
- Brig C.J.C. Molony, History of the Second World War, United Kingdom Military Series: The Mediterranean and Middle East, Vol VI: Victory in the Mediterranean, Part I: 1st April to 4th June 1944, London: HMSO, 1987/Uckfield, Naval & Military Press, 2004, ISBN 1-845740-70-X.
- Osborne, Mike, 2006. Always Ready: The Drill Halls of Britain's Volunteer Forces, Partizan Press, Essex. ISBN 1-85818-509-2
- Bryn Owen, Glamorgan – Its Gentlemen and Yeomanry, 1797 to 1908, Newport, Gwent: Starling Press, 1983, ISBN 0-903434-61-X.
- Bryn Owen, History of the Welsh Militia and Volunteer Corps 1757–1908. 2: The Glamorgan Regiments of Militia, Caernarfon: Palace Books, 1990, ISBN 1-871904-01-3.
- Maj-Gen I.S.O. Playfair & Brig C.J.C. Molony, History of the Second World War, United Kingdom Military Series: The Mediterranean and Middle East, Vol IV: The Destruction of the Axis forces in Africa, London: HMSO, 1966/Uckfield, Naval & Military Press, 2004, ISBN 1-845740-68-8* Edward M. Spiers, The Army and Society 1815–1914, London: Longmans, 1980, ISBN 0-582-48565-7.
- Lt-Col J.D. Sainsbury, The Hertfordshire Yeomanry Regiments, Royal Artillery, Part 1: The Field Regiments 1920-1946, Welwyn: Hertfordshire Yeomanry and Artillery Trust/Hart Books, 1999, ISBN 0-948527-05-6.
- Lt-Col Will Townend & Frank Baldwin, Gunners in Normandy: The History of the Royal Artillery in North-West Europe January 1942 to August 1944, Cheltenham: History Press, 2020, ISBN 978-0-7509-9044-8.
- Maj C.H. Dudley Ward, History of the 53rd (Welsh) Division (T.F.) 1914–1918, Cardiff: Western Mail, 1927/Uckfield: Naval & Military, 2004, ISBN 978-1-845740-50-4.

=== External sources ===
- Mark Conrad, The British Army, 1914 (archive site)
- British Army units from 1945 on Archived 29 August 2015 at the Wayback Machine
- British Artillery in World War 2 Archived 23 September 2017 at the Wayback Machine
- The Drill Hall Project
- Great War Centenary Drill Halls.
- The Long, Long Trail
- Orders of Battle at Patriot Files Archived 26 March 2023 at the Wayback Machine
- The Regimental Warpath 1914–1918 (archive site)
- Land Forces of Britain, the Empire and Commonwealth – Regiments.org (archive site)
- Royal Artillery 1939–1945
- Royal Artillery Units Netherlands 1944–1945
- Graham Watson, The Territorial Army 1947
