= Vandepeer =

Vandepeer is a surname. Notable people with the surname include:

- Cecil Vandepeer Clarke (1897–1961), English engineer
- Donald Vandepeer (1890–1968), English civil servant
- Murray Vandepeer (c. 1929–2008), Australian politician
