= Charles John Howell Thomas =

English civil servant and diplomat

Lieutenant Colonel Sir Charles John Howell Thomas, KCB, KCMG, TD (1874 – 26 November 1943) was an English civil servant and diplomat.

Thomas was appointed a Second Lieutenant in the 1st Glamorganshire Royal Garrison Artillery Volunteers in 1904, and as a supernumerary Captain in the 1st Glamorganshire (Howitzer) Battery, 1st Welsh (Howitzer) Brigade in 1908.

He was appointed a valuer in the Estate Duty Office in the Inland Revenue in 1090. He was surveyor to the Metropolitan Board of Works before the First World War, when he served as an officer in the Royal Field Artillery. After the war he represented the UK on the International Valuation Board Reparation Commission in Paris (1920–21), the International Committee on Ceded Property (1922) and the Compensation (Ireland) Commission (1922–25). He was then Chief Valuer to the Board of Inland Revenue (1925–27) before serving as Permanent Secretary to the Ministry of Agriculture and Fisheries from 1927 to 1936; he represented the UK at the Imperial Agricultural Bureaux from 1928 to 1927 and was part of the UK's delegation at the Ottawa Conference (1932) and the World Monetary and Economic Conference (1934). From 1936 to his death, he was chairman of the Tithe Redemption Committee.

Thomas was appointed a Companion of the Order of St Michael and St George (CMG) in the 1925 Birthday Honours in recognition of his services as a member of the Compensation (Ireland) Commission. He was knighed in the 1927 New Year Honours, and appointed a Knight Commander of the Order of the Bath (KCB) in the 1928 Birthday Honours. He was promoted to Knight Commander of the Order of St Michael and St George (KCMG) in the 1934 New Year Honours.

Government offices
Preceded by Sir Francis Floud	Permanent Secretary of the Ministry of Agriculture and Fisheries; 1927–1936	Succeeded by Sir Donald Fergusson
