= Toukabeur =

Tunisian Town

Toukabeur is a town in Béja Governorate, Tunisia located at 36°42′32″N, 9°31′16″E. Toukabeur is in the Medjerda River valley, and 2 km west of Chaouach (Suas) and 7 kilometers northwest of Majaz al Bab,(Membressa). Its postal code is 9024.

== History ==
=== Antiquity ===
The area has numerous ruins from the Roman era lying in situ. An inscription of Marcus Aurelius indicates that the city had no status of a Roman city.

The town appears to have taken its name from the pre-Roman Berber tombs, located at Chaouach 1 kilometer higher up the hillside. Chaouach was much older and larger settlement than Toukabeur during antiquity.

Babelon mentions important buildings, such as two triumphal arches (including the Triumphal arch of Sextilius Celsus), cisterns and tombs. Other remains include a city gate, a large building called "the Hammam" whose function is unknown (possibly thermal baths) as well as a large number of pools, cisterns and wells. To the west of the town are rock tombs (Haouanet).

=== World War II ===
During the Tunisian Campaign of World War II the British Army 11th infantry Brigade took the town April 1943.

=== Ancient bishopric ===
Toukabeur was also the seat of an ancient Roman Catholic diocese through the Vandal and Roman Empires. Known bishops include:

- A bishop, Fortunatus of Thuccaburi, was recorded for the year 256.
- a bishop named Megasius Tuccaborensis participated in the Council of Carthage (411).
- In 646, Stephanus Tuccaboriensis participated in the Council of the Africa Proconsularis.

=== Modern ===
Today the springs that first attracted the Romans still feed the village and water the orchards still in their antique. There are still 6 ancient cisterns at the entrance of the village, though converted stables. All round the ruins of the Roman town lie scattered half buried in the soil among the orchards on the slopes down to the foot of the locality.

== See also ==
- Medjez-El-Bab Memorial
