= Alan Neale =

English civil servant (1918–95)

Sir Alan Derrett Neale, KCB, MBE (24 October 1918 – 21 March 1995) was an English civil servant.

Educated at Highgate School and St John's College, Oxford, he was an officer in the Intelligence Corps in the Second World War. He entered the civil service in 1946 and served in the Board of Trade until 1968, when he moved to HM Treasury; there, he was Second Permanent Secretary from 1971 to 1973, with responsibility for overseas finance and monetary policy. He was then Permanent Secretary of the Ministry of Agriculture, Fisheries and Food from 1973 to 1978, during which time the UK entered the European Community and adopted the Common Agricultural Policy. He was then a member of the Monopolies and Mergers Commission, serving as deputy chairman from 1982 to 1986. He was then deputy chairman of the Association of Futures Brokers and Dealers (1987–91) and was also chair of the Reform Club. He authored several books, including The Anti-Trust Laws of the USA (1960).

Government offices
| Preceded by Sir Basil Engholm | Permanent Secretary of the Ministry of Agriculture, Fisheries and Food; 1973–1978 | Succeeded by Sir Brian Hayes |
