= Brian Hayes (civil servant) =

English civil servant (1929–2022)

Sir Brian David Hayes, GCB (5 May 1929 – 31 May 2022) was an English civil servant.

== Life and career ==
Brian David Hayes was born in Norwich, Norfolk on 5 May 1929. He was educated at Norwich School and Corpus Christi College, Cambridge, he joined the Ministry of Agriculture, Fisheries and Food in 1956 and was its Permanent Secretary from 1979 to 1983. He was then Permanent Secretary of the Department of Trade and Industry from 1983 to 1989, jointly until 1985.

He subsequently held directorships at Guardian Royal Exchange, Tate and Lyle, and Unilever.

Hayes died at a care centre in Teddington, London on 31 May 2022, aged 93.

Government offices
| Preceded by Sir Alan Neale | Permanent Secretary of the Ministry of Agriculture, Fisheries and Food; 1978–1983 | Succeeded by Sir Michael Franklin |
