= John Winnifrith =

Sir Alfred John Digby Winnifrith KCB (16 October 1908 – 1 January 1993) was a senior British Civil Servant at the Ministry of Agriculture.

Winnifrith was born at Ightham, Kent, the son of Rev Bertram Winnifrith. He was educated at Westminster School and Christ Church, Oxford. He entered the Board of Trade in 1932 and went to the Treasury in 1934. During World War II he was seconded to be Assistant Secretary to the War Cabinet Office and Civil Service Combined Operation HQ from 1942 to 1944. He was appointed CB in 1950. In 1959, he became Permanent Secretary at the Ministry of Agriculture, Fisheries and Food, and was knighted KCB in 1959.

On retirement from the civil service in 1967, Winnifrith was Director General of the National Trust from 1968 to 1970. He was a Trustee of the British Museum (Natural History) from 1967 to 1972, a member of the Royal Commission on Environmental Pollution 1970 to 1973, a member of the Commonwealth War Graves Commission from 1970 to 1983, and of the Hops Marketing Board from 1970 to 1978.

He married Lesbia, eldest daughter of Sir Arthur Cochrane, and had three children. His sister was the actress Anna Lee. His son Dr Tom Winnifrith lectured at Warwick University and produced several publications on Greece, the Balkans and the Brontë sisters.

Government offices
Preceded by Sir Alan Hitchman	Permanent Secretary of the Ministry of Agriculture, Fisheries and Food; 1959–1967	Succeeded by Sir Basil Engholm
