= 1st Monmouthshire Artillery Volunteers =

1st Monmouthshire Artillery Volunteers 4th (Welsh) Brigade, RFA 83rd (Welsh) Field Regiment, RA 283rd (Monmouthshire) Field Regiment, RA
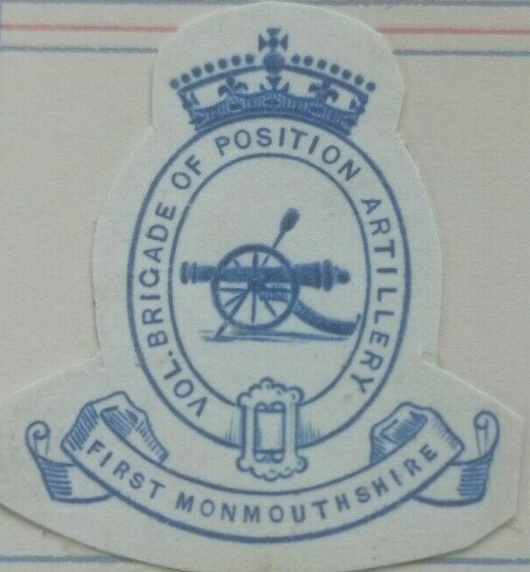
- Crest of the !st Monmouthshire Artillery Volunteers, c. 1902
- Active: 4 October 1860 – 1 May 1961
- Country: United Kingdom
- Branch: Territorial Force/Territorial Army
- Role: Garrison artillery Position artillery Field artillery
- Part of: 53rd (Welsh) Division
- Garrison/HQ: Newport, Wales
- Engagements: Sinai and Palestine Campaign; North West Europe Campaign

The 1st Monmouthshire Artillery Volunteer Corps was a unit of Britain's Volunteer Force raised in 1860 from Monmouthshire in the Welsh borders. After transfer to the Territorial Force it served with the 53rd (Welsh) Division in Palestine in World War I and in North West Europe in World War II. Its successors serve with today's Army Reserve.

== Volunteer Force ==
The enthusiasm for the Volunteer movement following an invasion scare in 1859 saw the creation of many Volunteer Corps composed of part-time soldiers eager to supplement the Regular British Army in time of need. An Artillery Volunteer Corps (AVC) of two batteries was formed at Newport in Monmouthshire on 4 October 1860. Two additional batteries were raised by 1863: C at Abercarn and Crumlin, Caerphilly, and D at Blackwood, Caerphilly. Charles Lyne was appointed Major in command.

In 1864 the unit was included in the 1st Administrative Brigade of Glamorganshire Artillery Volunteers, but it raised two more batteries at Newport in 1866 and became an independent unit, with Lyne promoted to Lieutenant-Colonel. In 1873 the 1st Worcestershire AVC was attached to it, and the following year the 1st Administrative Brigade, Monmouthshire Artillery Volunteers was formed, comprising the two units, with its headquarters (HQ) at Newport and Lyne in command.

However, by 1878, the 1st Monmouths were down to a strength of two batteries, and the admin brigade was renamed the 1st Administrative Brigade, Worcestershire Artillery Volunteers, with HQ moving to Worcester. Charles Lyne retired and became Honorary Colonel of the brigade. His son, Lt-Col C.R. Lyne, became commanding officer in 1883. When the artillery volunteers were consolidated in 1880, the brigade became the 1st Worcester (Worcester and Monmouth) AVC, with the former 1st Monmouthshire reduced to Nos 7 and 8 Batteries at Griffithstown. Recruitment picked up in Monmouthshire during the 1880s, and by the end of the decade it was large enough to be an independent corps once more, with six batteries, and the HQ returned to Newport.

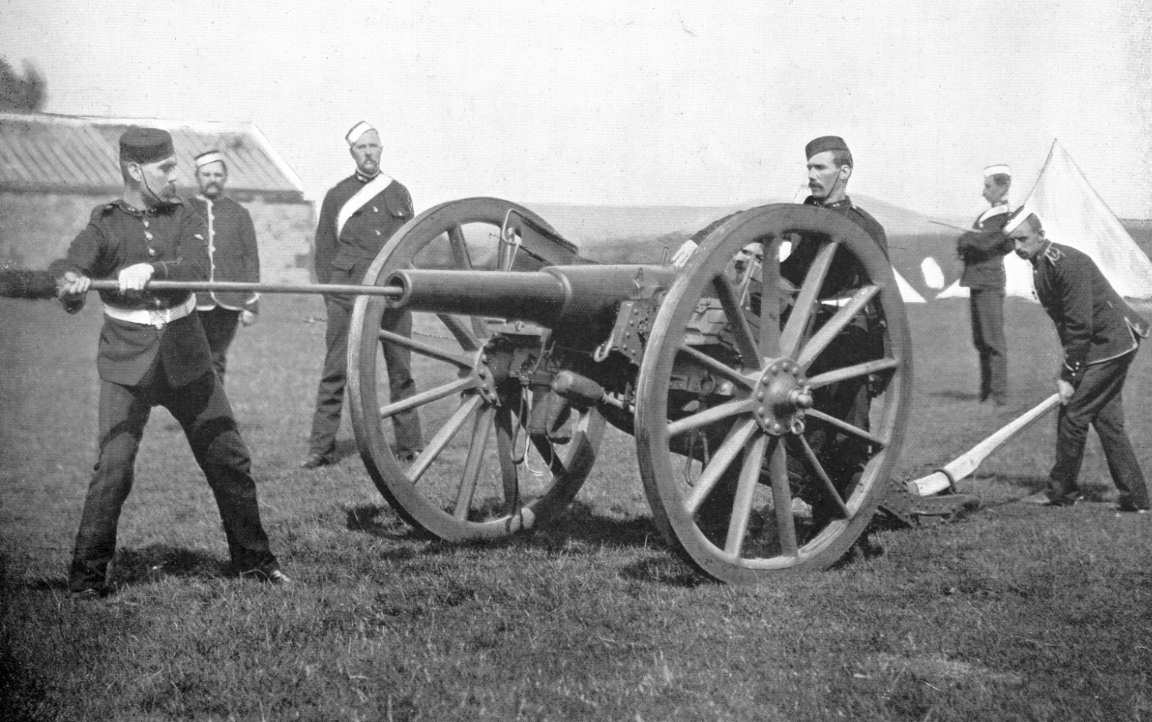
16-Pounder RML gun manned by Artillery Volunteers

The AVCs were intended to serve as garrison artillery manning fixed defences, but a number of the early units manned semi-mobile 'position batteries' of smooth-bore field guns pulled by agricultural horses. However, the War Office (WO) refused to pay for the upkeep of field guns and the concept died out in the 1870s. It was revived in 1888 when some Volunteer batteries were reorganised as 'position artillery' with 16-pounder Rifled Muzzle-Loading guns to work alongside the Volunteer infantry brigades. The six garrison batteries of the revived 1st Monmouthshire AVC were organised into three position batteries, named heavy batteries from 1903.

The 1st Worcesters had formed part of the Welsh Division of the Royal Artillery (RA) from 1882 to 1889, and the Western Division thereafter. The 1st Monmouthshire was placed in the Western Division on being reformed. In 1899 the Artillery Volunteers were transferred to the Royal Garrison Artillery (RGA), the 1st Monmouths becoming the 1st Monmouthshire Royal Garrison Artillery (Volunteers) when the divisional organisation was abolished on 1 January 1902.

== Territorial Force ==
When the Volunteers were subsumed into the new Territorial Force under the Haldane Reforms of 1908, the 1st Monmouthshire transferred to the Royal Field Artillery (RFA) as the IV (or 4th) Welsh Brigade, with the following organisation:

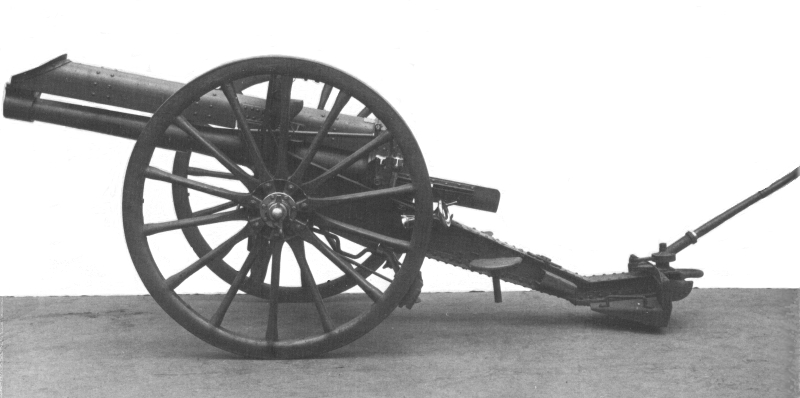
15-pounder gun, issued to the Territorial Force

IV Welsh Brigade, Royal Field Artillery

- HQ at Drill Hall, Lime Street, Monmouth
- 1st Monmouth Battery at Newport
- 2nd Monmouth Battery at Risca
- 3rd Monmouth Battery at Griffithstown
- IV Welsh Brigade Ammunition Column at Newport

The Newport Cadet Corps, RFA, was also affiliated to the brigade.

The new brigade was part of the Territorial Force's Welsh Division and the batteries were each issued with four 15-pounder guns.

== World War I ==
=== Mobilisation ===
The units of the Welsh Division had just departed for their annual summer camp when the order to mobilise was received on 4 August 1914. They then returned home and assembled at their drill halls to mobilise. The 4th Welsh Brigade mobilised at Newport under the command of Lt-Col D.E. Williams, VD, who had been CO since 1911.

By 11 August the units had completed their concentration and Territorial Force members were invited to volunteer for Overseas Service. Four days later the War Office issued instructions to separate those men who had signed up for Home Service only, and form these into reserve units, and on 31 August, the formation of a reserve or 2nd Line unit was authorised for each 1st Line unit where 60 per cent or more of the men had volunteered for Overseas Service. The titles of these 2nd Line units would be the same as the original, but distinguished by a '2/' prefix. In this way duplicate batteries, brigades and divisions were created, mirroring those Territorial Force formations being sent overseas.

=== 1/IV Welsh Brigade, RFA ===
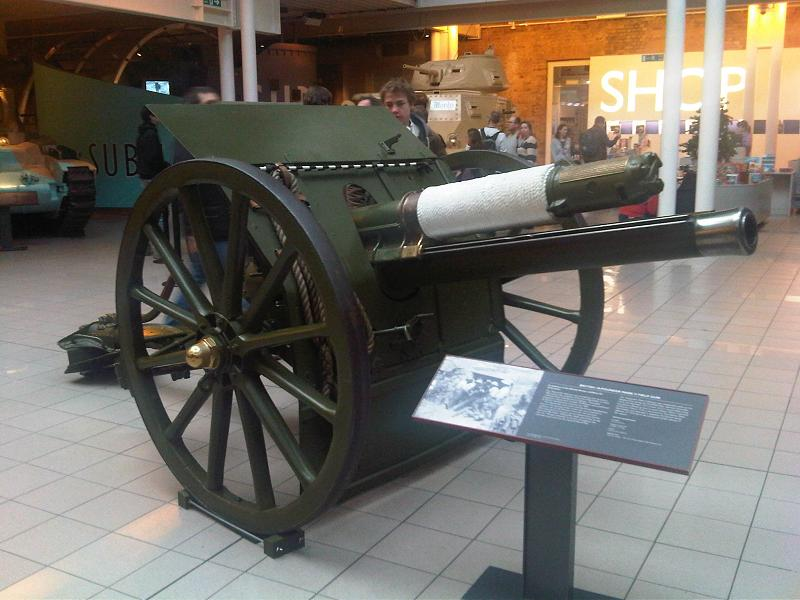
18-pounder preserved at the Imperial War Museum

At the end of August the Welsh Division concentrated at Northampton to continue its training. On 18 November the division was warned for garrison duty in India, but this was cancelled and in December it moved to Cambridge, then to Bedford in May 1915. In July the infantry of the division (now renamed the 53rd (Welsh) Division) embarked for service at Gallipoli, but the divisional artillery remained at Bedford. In October the batteries were re-armed with modern 18-pounder guns and on 8 November they handed over their obsolescent 15-pounders to the 2nd Line unit, which had just arrived at Bedford.

53rd (Welsh) Divisional Artillery was now ordered to France to join the British Expeditionary Force (BEF) on the Western Front. It embarked on 20 November and had concentrated at Pont-Remy by 25 November, from where parties were sent to various divisional artilleries for instruction in front line duties.

Meanwhile, after suffering appalling casualties at Gallipoli, 53rd (Welsh) Division had been withdrawn to Egypt to refit. On 30 January 1916 the divisional artillery was ordered to rejoin the rest of the division. The batteries entrained at Pont-Remy, embarked at Marseille on 3 February and disembarked at Alexandria on 11 February. By 22 February the artillery had rejoined the division at Beni Salama. For the rest of the year the recuperating division was stationed in the Suez Canal defences.

In May 1916 the Territorial Force field brigades were numbered, the 1/IV Welsh being designated CCLXVIII (268) Bde, RFA, and the batteries became A, B and C. Then on 25 December 1916 the divisional artillery was reorganised: A Bty was broken up between B and C Btys (to make them up to six guns each) and they were redesignated A and B, while B Battery (the former 2nd Glamorgan Bty) joined from the old CCLXV (I Welsh) Bde and became C (Howitzer) Bty, equipped with 4.5-inch howitzers. The brigade itself was redesignated CCLXVI (266) Bde. 53rd (W) Divisional Ammunition Column had remained in France, and was reformed in Egypt by abolishing the Brigade Ammunition Columns.

==== Gaza ====
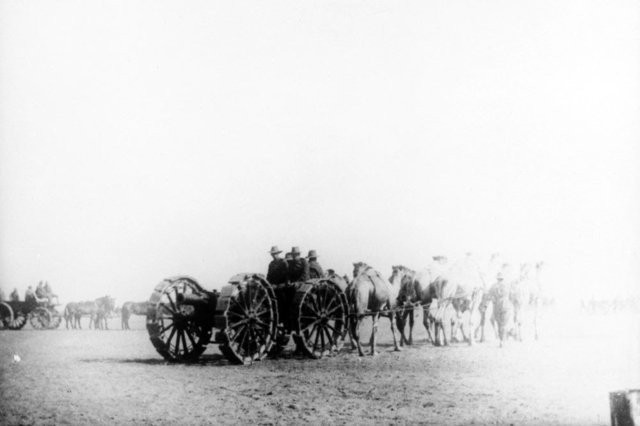
4.5-inch Howitzer with 'ped-rails' (sand tyres) around wheels, as used in crossing Sinai

Early in 1917 the Egyptian Expeditionary Force launched the Sinai and Palestine Campaign by crossing the Sinai desert and advancing against Turkish forces at Gaza City. The First Battle of Gaza began during the night of 25/26 March when 53rd (W) Division advanced 12 miles (19 km) to cross the Wadi Ghuzzeh, with CCLXVI Bde following 158th (North Wales) Infantry Brigade. Despite the darkness and morning fog – 158th Brigade lost its way and arrived late – the infantry were in position by 8:30 and at 10:10 CCLXVI Bde opened fire on Ali Muntar. However, the attack orders were late reaching the infantry, and the main bombardment did not begin until 12:00. The division's attack went well, with 158th Bde establishing a lodgement at Ali Muntar, but the artillery was too weak to suppress the Turkish fire – CCLXVI Brigade had to support the frontage of two infantry brigades, and there were not enough forward observation officers (FOOs) or signal cable – and casualties were heavy. By 18:30 the division had taken all its objectives and its troops were in the eastern streets of Gaza when the attack was stopped for lack of water. Although 53rd (W) Division consolidated its position, it was very congested by next morning, with the guns of 53rd (W) and 54th (East Anglian) Divisions firing back to back. The infantry were withdrawn to Wadi Guzzeh the following day.

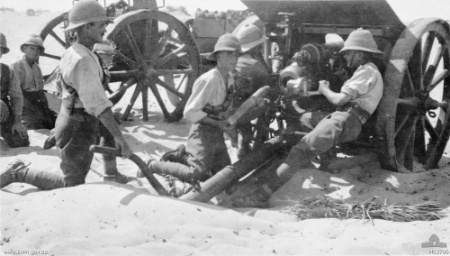
18-pounder gun in Sinai

For the Second Battle of Gaza, beginning on 17 April, 53rd (W) Division's role was to advance up the coast across Wadi Ghuzzeh, and then attack Gaza after an artillery bombardment. The bombardment was begun by the heavy artillery and warships offshore, then the 4.5-inch howitzers began firing gas shells against Turkish batteries. At 07.20, 10 minutes before Zero, the 18-pounders began engaging the objectives, CCLXVI Bde firing at Samson's Ridge. The infantry attacked punctually at 7:30 and 53rd (W) Division got onto Samson's Ridge. However, it could not push straight on to the redoubt on the ridge because the artillery support was too weak (the gas shelling was ineffectual) and the neighbouring division was badly held up. 160th Brigade carried the redoubt later in the day, but were still short of the main Turkish defence position. Casualties had been high and gains minimal, and the EEF dug in for a summer of trench warfare. The artillery batteries were regularly ordered to fire test rounds at specified map coordinates to prove their readiness for defensive fire

Although the War Office was unable to provide more divisions for the EEF, it could send guns: 53rd (W) Division's batteries were temporarily brought up to a strength of eight rather than six guns, until further troops arrived. The reorganised EEF renewed its offensive (the Third Battle of Gaza) on 27 October. XX Corps, including 53rd (W) Divisional artillery, moved into position during the night of 30/31 October to capture Beersheba, and the bombardment began at 05.55. After a pause at 7:00 to let the dust settle and determine the effect, the guns reopened. Infantry parties advanced to within 30 yards (27 m) of the barrage to finish cutting the barbed wire. They then rushed Point 1069 and the 18-pounder batteries began to move up to more advanced positions. Beersheba had fallen to the Desert Mounted Corps and XX Corps could bivouack on the objective. On 3 November 53rd (W) Division was ordered to advance to the Tel es Sheria road led by 158th Brigade. It was a difficult march over broken country in hot weather and CCLXVI Bde, escorted by 5th Battalion, Royal Welsh Fusiliers (RWF), made a wide movement out to the east where there was a track over comparatively flat ground. There were several sharp actions with enemy detachments, and 5th RWF was called from escort duty to support the attack on the Khuweilfe heights. Water was so short that the artillery horses had to be sent back to Beersheba for the night and afterwards only brought forward when guns actually had to be moved. Over following days 53rd (W) Division kept up pressure on the enemy in the hills so that the EEF could roll up the main trench lines (the Battle of Hareira and Sheria). CCLXVI Brigade and other units of the divisional artillery moved east with 5th RWF to find the best road. Then on 6 November the division assaulted the Khuweilfe position supported by an intense bombardment by all its own guns and a heavy battery. The guns had been dragged into position using double horse teams, and simply lined up alongside batteries that had already registered their targets. Early in the morning a mist rose, preventing the gunners from seeing their targets, and causing a delay in the attack. After confused fighting the position was taken and then held with the support of the divisional artillery breaking up Turkish counter-attacks.

==== Jerusalem ====
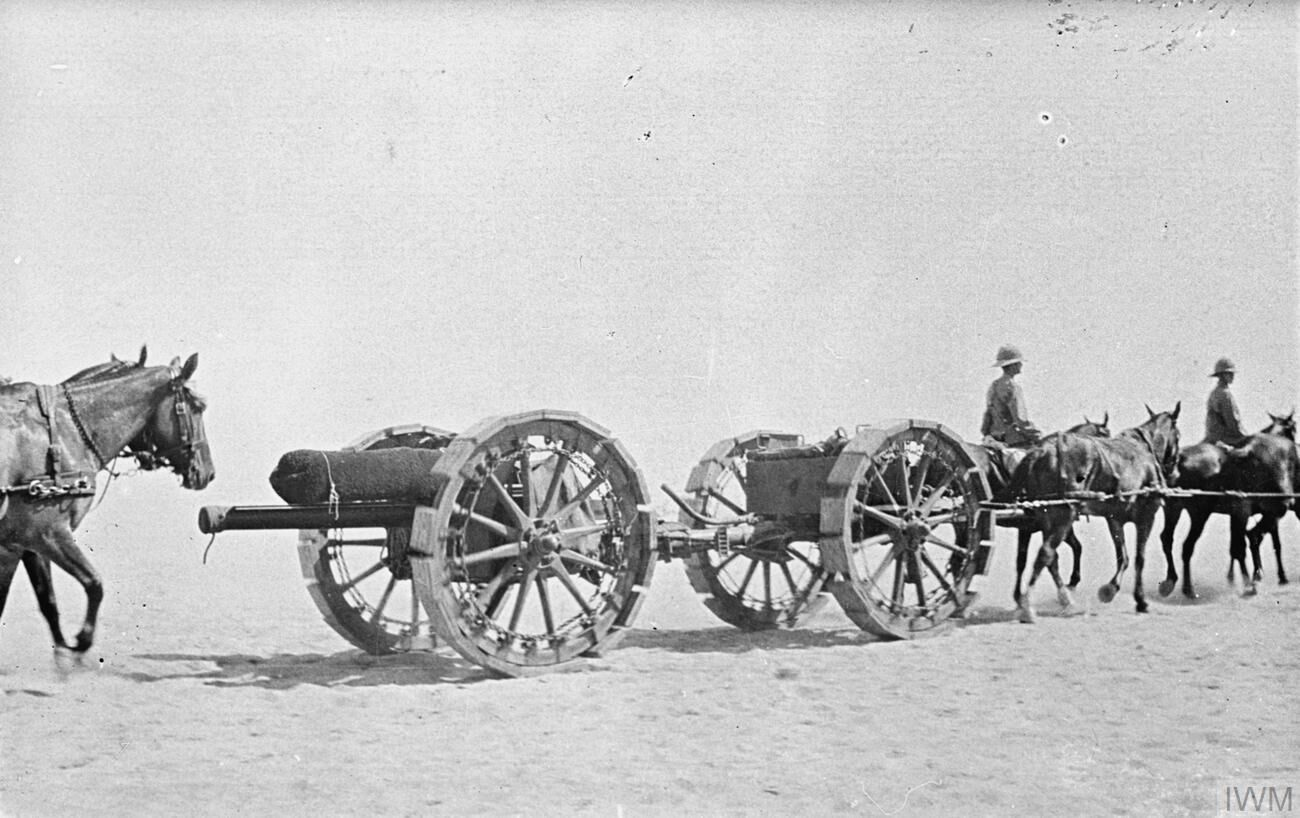
18-pounder with sand wheels

After breaking through the Gaza positions, the EEF pressed on to Jerusalem in appalling weather. The city was to be captured by XX Corps after a rapid advance by a flying column known as 'Mott's Detachment' based on 53rd (W) Division. It included the howitzer batteries of the divisional artillery in its advance guard and main body, while the field batteries of CCLXVI Bde provided flank guards to the long column advancing through terrible weather and road conditions. The batteries also support 7th Cheshire Regiment in its preliminary attack on 7 December. Jerusalem fell to the EEF the following day.

There was still heavy fighting around Jerusalem. 53rd (W) Division improved its positions on 17 December by seizing the commanding ridges east of Abu Dis, with CCLXVI Bde supporting 4th Royal Sussex onto its objectives of 'Scrag Hill' and 'Sussex Ridge'. The division moved on to attack Ras ez Zamby and White Hill on 21 December, with CCLXVI Bde participating in a preliminary bombardment and then a lifting barrage at 5:15. The attack took the crest but was then held up, so the barrage was re-arranged and from 7:20 to 7:40 all the 18-pdrs concentrated on ez Zamby and 'the Wall'. Bringing up ammunition through the rough country was difficult, and many artillery horses died under the harsh conditions. On 27 December the Turks counter-attacked to try to regain Jerusalem. They retook the crest of White Hill, but the divisional artillery rendered it untenable, and it remained in No man's land. Meanwhile, the EEF had launched an advance on another part of the front, and 53rd (W) Division joined in next day, with CCLXVI Bde supporting 160th Bde. By 30 December all organised resistance in front had ended.

==== Tell 'Asur ====
When the weather improved in February 1918, XX Corps advanced to the Capture of Jericho, but the ground was so bad that one field battery took 36 hours to cover 8 miles (13 km). To widen the EEF's base of operations, XX Corps attacked Tell 'Asur in March. 53rd (W) Divisional artillery was reinforced by other divisions so that there were had four composite brigades available for its attack, two to each attacking infantry brigade, but arranged so that three (including CCLXVI) could concentrate if necessary to support the main assault by 158th Bde. The Battle of Tell 'Asur was launched early on the morning of 9 March. The leading battalions began crossing the wide Mo man's land at 2:00, but the guns remained silent while the infantry picked their way forward in fog. The subsequent fighting was confused, with false reports that Tell 'Asur had been captured, and the fighting went on all day while the peak was taken, lost, and retaken, followed by four more Turkish counter-attacks before it was secured. That night the division also took Chipp Hill, which had defied the neighbouring division during daylight. The advance was resumed on 10 March and the ridges in front were captured with the help of a heavy and well-directed bombardment. The artillery was now able to move forward, but the wadi in front was too steep to climb. A number of other hilltop positions were captured on 12 March, after which the artillery passed over the wadi during darkness. The fighting died down and the new line was held through the summer months. CCLXVI Brigade moved down to the Jordan Valley with 158th Infantry Bde in late March to cover the EEF's First Transjordan raid, then rejoined the rest of the division at Ramallah at the beginning of April.

The EEF was now required to send urgent reinforcements to the Western Front where the German spring offensive threatened a breakthrough. In the summer of 1918 the 53rd Division was 'Indianised', with three quarters of the infantry battalions replaced by others drawn from the British Indian Army, but this did not affect the divisional artillery, which retained its composition to the end of the war.

==== Megiddo ====
At the climactic Battle of Megiddo 53rd Division was positioned on the right flank above the Jordan Valley. The division launched its attack late on the first day (18 September). the artillery opened slow fire on 'Keen's Knoll' to drown the sound of the leading infantry scrambling down from the heights. 17th Indian Infantry were in position to attack at 22:00 and a 20-minute bombardment crashed down before the regiment went in with the bayonet. Coming from an unexpected direction, the attack was completely successful, and the rest of 159th Bde attacked. The divisional commander ordered the artillery to increase their rate of fire on the wadis behind to block the enemy's retreat. 160th Brigade then attacked in the darkness, guided by the glow of smoke shells fire by the artillery. The 3rd Battalion, 152nd Punjabis, had the severest fighting in attempting to capture Malul at the end of 'Nairn Ridge': in this area the Turks did not actually occupy their trenches, so the bombardment was ineffective. When the artillery lifted and the infantry attacked they were met by fire from untouched Turkish machine guns. The attack was broken up, though some parties of the regiment hung on within 150 yards (140 m) of the crest. The telephone line was cut by Turkish artillery fire, so the battalion could not call down a repeat bombardment; by the time a runner could get through with the request, the battalion had withdrawn after two more attempts to reach the top. Apart from this failure, the main enemy positions had been taken. The afternoon of 19 September was quiet on 53rd Division's front, though one Turkish force was discovered eating a meal, and five batteries were turned onto them. This disaster to the Turks that probably contributed to the division's easy advance that evening, when Malul was secured, allowing the guns to move forward. However, a Turkish counter-attack while the guns were moving temporarily retook some of their lost positions. The division now blocked the enemy's line of retreat eastwards across the Jordan. The pressure was kept up on 20 September and by the end of the next day the Turkish army was shattered and could be seen streaming north – to the annoyance of the gunners who were out of range.

After the battle the pursuit was continued by the cavalry and air force, and 53rd Division was used to clear the battlefield and repair roads. It was then withdrawn to Alexandria before the Armistice of Mudros came into effect on 31 October. Demobilisation began on 20 December and was completed in June 1919. CCLXVI Brigade was placed in suspended animation.

=== 2/IV Welsh Brigade, RFA ===
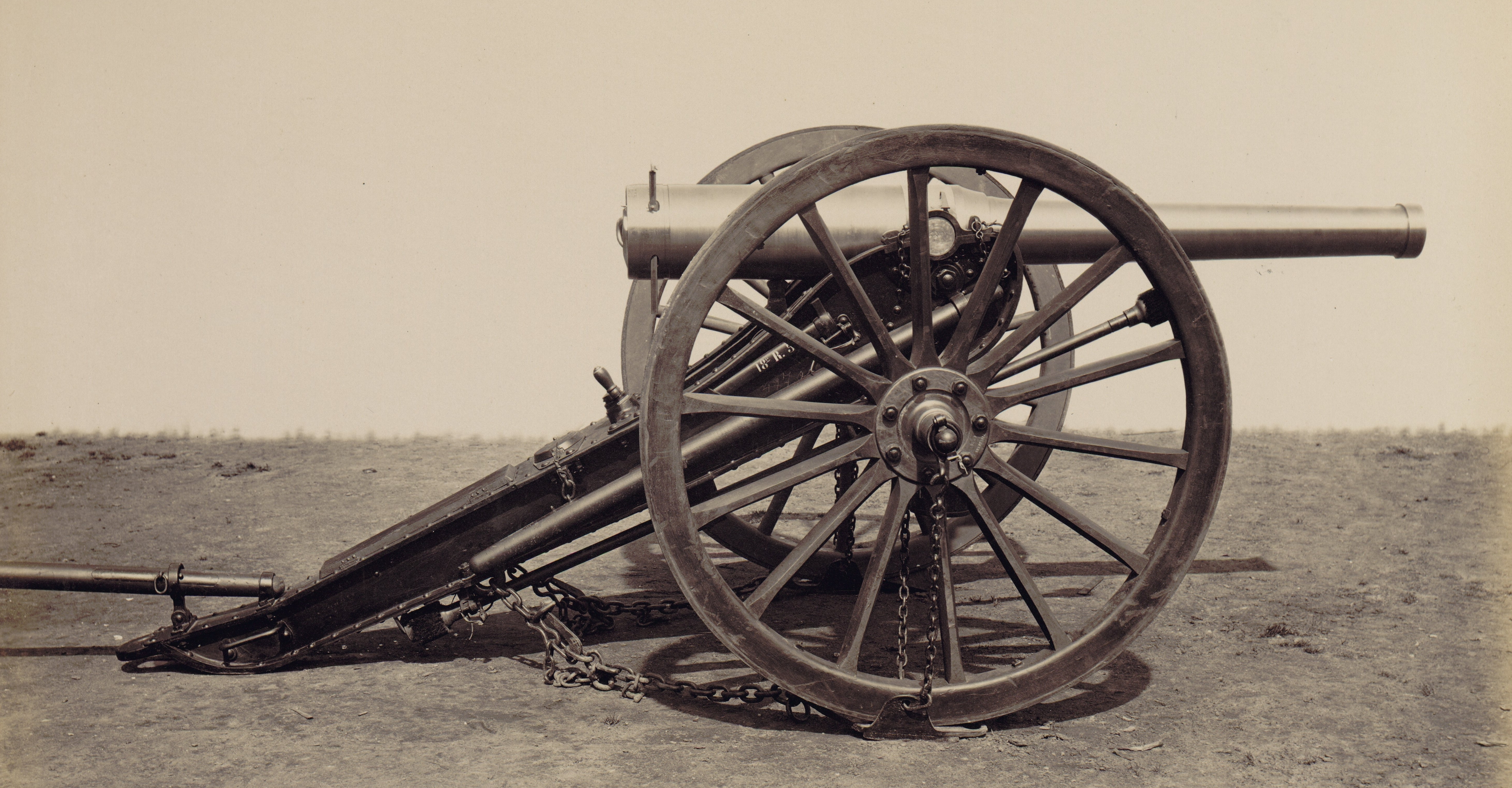
French De Bange 90 mm gun

Although 2/IV Welsh Bde was raised before the end of 1914, the 2nd Welsh Division (68th (2nd Welsh) Division from August 1915) did not concentrate at Northampton until Spring 1915, the brigade joining it on 29 April. It moved to Earlswood on 4 August 1915 and then arrived at Bedford to replace the 1st Line brigade on 2 November. Training of the units was made difficult by the lack of arms and equipment, and the requirement to provide drafts to the 1st Line overseas. In June the first saddlery and horses began to arrive, but no guns until August, when the brigade received four French De Bange 90 mm guns. Some ammunition wagons arrived in September, and eight more 90 mm guns in October. Training began to speed up, with the 90 mm guns standing in for 15-pounders. When the brigade arrived at Bedford it took over 12 x 15-pounders from the 1st Line. In December 1915 these in turn were replaced by modern 18-pounders.

68th (2nd Welsh) Division was assigned a role in Home Defence in November 1915 when it joined First Army (Home Forces) in Central Force, with its units quartered across Eastern England. In May 1916 the brigade was numbered CCCXLIII Brigade (343 Bde) and the batteries became A, B and C. Later in the year CCCXL (Howitzer) Bde (formerly 2/I Welsh Bde) was broken up and its A Bty (formerly 2/1st Glamorgan Bty) joined CCCXLIII Bde as D (H) Bty.

The Home Defence divisions continually supplied drafts to units fighting overseas. In the autumn of 1916, A/CCCXLIII Bty was detached tand replaced by a newly raised 502 (H) Bty, RFA. A Battery was then given back its old Territorial Force title as 502 (2/1 Monmouth) (Howitzer) Battery and left for France, while the new battery in CCCXLIII Bde was renumbered as 545 (H) Bty. 502 (2/1 Monmouth) (H) Bty disembarked at Le Havre on 6 October 1916, left two days later and joined CXXVI Bde RFA in 37th Division on 9 October, becoming its C (H) Bty on 23 October. It was equipped with four 4.5-inch howitzers.

37th Division had been in France since the middle of 1915, but it had still not taken part in a major operation. Now it was involved in the Battle of the Ancre (the last phase of the Somme Offensive) starting on 13 November. 37th Divisional Artillery was in the line for the whole six-day battle, at first covering the front of 63rd (Royal Naval) Division before 37th Division took over the front.

On 25 January 1917, C(H)/CXXVI Bty (the former 2/1 Monmouth Bty) was broken up and its Right and Left Sections used to make up D(H)CXXIII and D(H)CXXIV Btys up to six howitzers each. These two batteries served with 37th Divisional Artillery on the Western Front for the rest of the war.

The rest of CCCXLIII Bde had disappeared from 68th (2nd W) Division's order of battle by mid-1917.

== Interwar ==
The brigade was reformed in the 53rd (W) Division in 1920, initially as 3rd Welsh Brigade, RFA, and redesignated the 83rd (Welsh) Brigade, RFA, when the Territorial Force was reorganised as the Territorial Army (TA) in 1921. The howitzer battery was formed from a squadron of the Montgomeryshire Yeomanry and a company of the 1st Battalion, Herefordshire Regiment, giving the brigade the following organisation:

- HQ at Drill Hall, Mendalgief Road, Newport, later at Lime Street, then at Dock Street
- 329 (Monmouthshire) Field Bty at Newport
- 330 (Monmouthshire) Field Bty at Cross Keys
- 331 (Monmouthshire) Field Bty at Griffithstown
- 332 (Radnorshire) Field Bty (Howitzers) at Llandrindod Wells, Radnorshire, later at Knighton

The brigade was once more in 53rd (W) Division. In 1924 the RFA was subsumed into the Royal Artillery (RA), and the word 'Field' was inserted into the titles of its brigades and batteries. The establishment of a TA divisional artillery brigade was four 6-gun batteries, three equipped with 18-pounders and one with 4.5-inch howitzers, all of World War I patterns. However, the batteries only held four guns in peacetime. The guns and their first-line ammunition wagons were still horsedrawn and the battery staffs were mounted. Partial mechanisation was carried out from 1927, but the guns retained iron-tyred wheels until pneumatic tyres began to be introduced just before World War II.

In 1938 the RA modernised its nomenclature and a lieutenant-colonel's command was designated a 'regiment' rather than a 'brigade'; this applied to TA field brigades from 1 November 1938.

== World War II ==
=== Mobilisation ===
The TA was doubled in size after the Munich Crisis of 1938, and most regiments split to form duplicates. Part of the reorganisation was that field artillery regiments changed from four six-gun batteries to an establishment of two batteries, each of three four-gun troops. For the 83rd (Welsh) Fd Rgt this resulted in the following organisation from 1 July 1939:

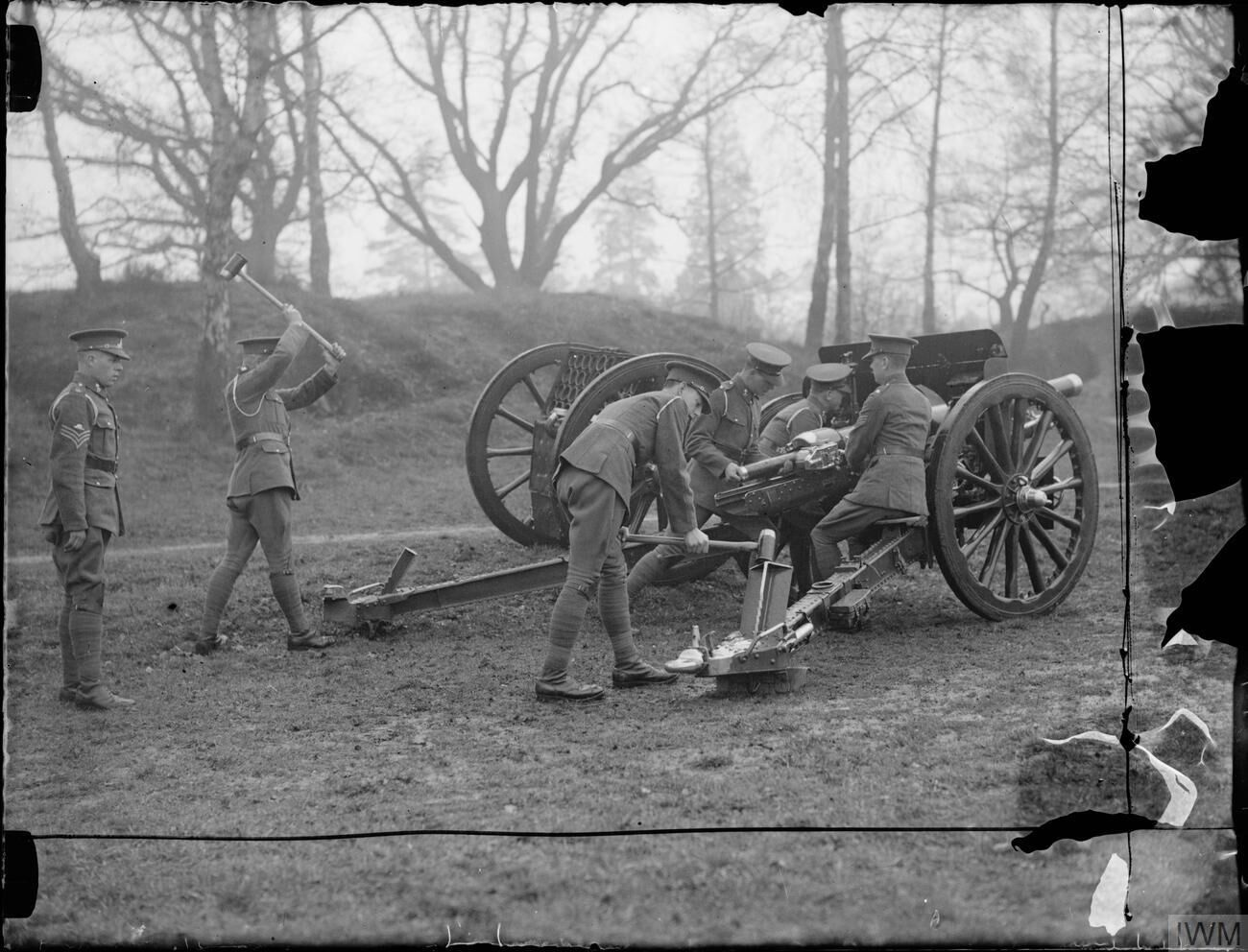
Emplacing an 18-pounder with wooden wheels at the start of World War II

83rd (Welsh) Field Regiment

- 329 (Monmouthshire) Field Bty at Newport
- 330 (Monmouthshire) Field Bty at Cross Keys

133rd Field Regiment

- 331 (Monmouthshire) Field Bty at Griffithstown
- 332 (Radnorshire) Field Bty at Knighton

Both regiments were in 53rd (Welsh) Division throughout World War II and shared similar histories.

=== Home defence ===
Parts of 53rd (Welsh) Division were sent to Northern Ireland from October 1939, and the whole division was stationed there from 3 April 1940 to 30 April 1941 as part of VI Corps. The establishment of a field regiment from 1941 onwards was three batteries, each of two four-gun troops of 25-pounders with Quad gun tractors.

On returning to mainland Britain, the division served in Northern Ireland. One of the lessons learned from the Battle of France was that the two-battery organisation did not work: field regiments were intended to support an infantry brigade of three battalions. As a result, they were reorganised into three 8-gun batteries. On 8–9 February 1941 83rd (W) Fd Rgt formed 460 Fd Bty at Downpatrick and 133rd Fd Rgt formed 497 Fd Bty at Portadown. 133rd Field Rgt was authorised to use its parent unit's 'Welsh' subtitle from 17 February 1942.

53rd (W) Division returned to England under III Corps on 1 May 1941, and moved to Western Command on 11 November. On 8 April 1942 it was assigned to XII Corps District, then from 15 May 1943 in XII Corps it became part of 21st Army Group training for the Allied invasion of Normandy (Operation Overlord).

==== Normandy ====
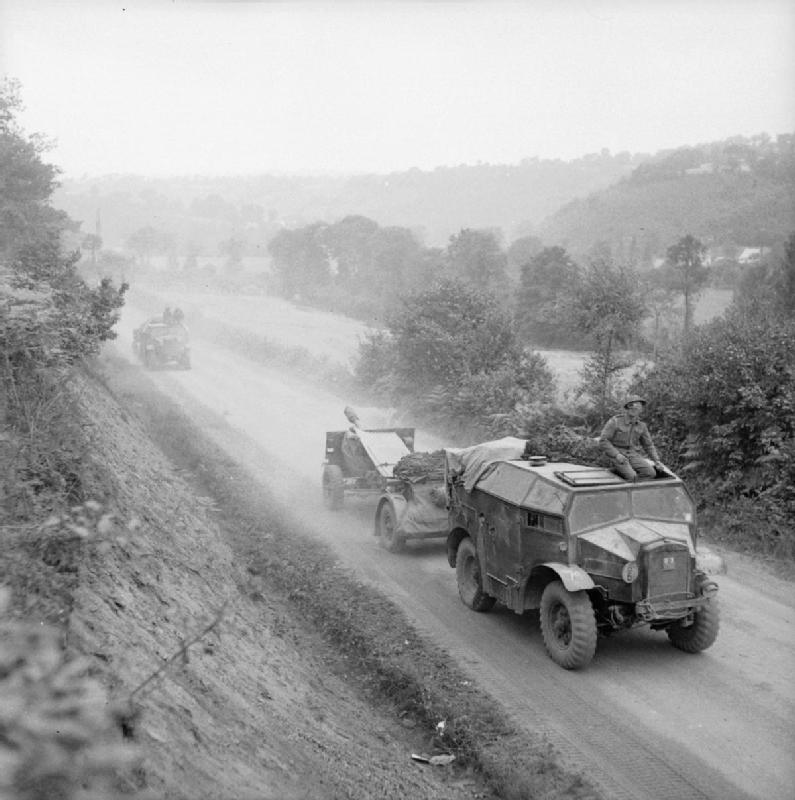
25-pounders and Quad tractors advancing in Normandy August 1944

53rd (Welsh) Division was among the follow-up troops landing after D-Day (6 June). Its units were at sea from 21 June and completed landing on 27 June. On 1 July it relieved 15th (Scottish) Division on the River Odon after the Battle of 'Scottish Corridor'. 53rd Division was then involved in the Second Battle of the Odon from 15 July, capturing Cahier and holding on to it by hard fighting. When the breakout from the Normandy beachhead began in early August, 53rd Division cleared the banks of the River Orne and then fought its way towards Falaise to help in closing the Falaise Pocket. By late August its units were across the Seine and driving over open country towards the River Somme. On 4 September the division cleared St Pol and was working its way through the canal area west of Lille. On 12 September 83rd Regiment moved into the outskirts of Antwerp, where they were treated with hospitality by the liberated inhabitants, even while engaging enemy targets round the docks in grain elevators, tall buildings and hotels.

==== Netherlands ====
There was a pause at the Meuse-Escaut Canal before Operation Market Garden was launched on 17 September. XII Corps had an important subsidiary role clearing the country west of XXX Corps' main thrust. 83rd Field Regiment came into action to support 158 Bde's crossing of the Meuse-Escaut Canal, suffering some casualties from Luftwaffe air attack on the night of 18–19 September while crossing the canal. 133rd came into action and crossed the canal the following day in support of 160th Bde. During an attack on Reusel on 25 September, Capt Frank Smith of 133rd Fd Rgt with his signaller accompanied a company of 6th RWF as FOO. The company became engaged in house-to-house fighting and after all the officers were wounded Smith took command, and led it within 300 yards (270 m) of the objective before the company second-in-command could come up and take over. Smith was later awarded a Military Cross (MC).

On 4 October, the 83rd Regiment moved to Sint-Oedenrode in the Market Garden 'corridor' supporting 158th Brigade, and two days later 133rd Regiment moved with 160th Bde into the Nijmegen bridgehead captured during Market Garden. Both positions were under frequent fire: on 13 October the 330 Battery of the 83rd Regiment was shelled as the Germans prepared a counter-attack against 158th Bde; the battery lost seven killed and 12 wounded when the battery command post (CP) was hit by two shells. The CP was quickly re-established, partly due to the actions of Lt. Trevor Scholes, Royal Signals, who won an MC in this action for his efforts to make good the radios and to continue to relay fire orders to the guns. The battery's defensive fire tasks were instrumental in defeating an attack that got within 20 yards (18 m) of 158th Bde's positions. On 16 October 83rd Regiment took part in Operation Winkle: an intense fire programme by all arms rising to a crescendo, followed by loudspeaker appeals to German soldiers to desert to the Allied lines, covered by a smokescreen fired by the regiment.

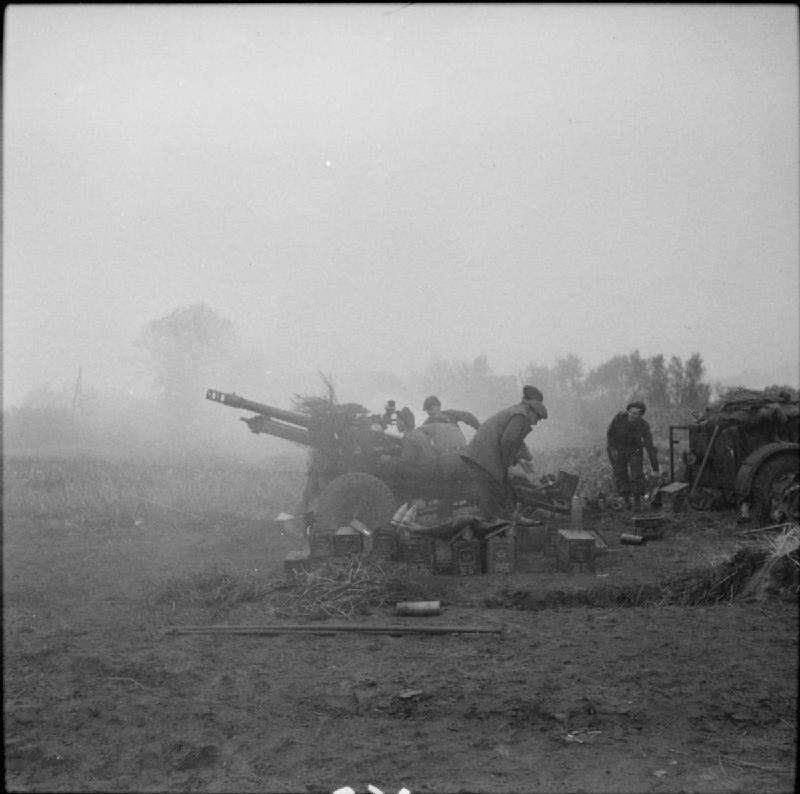
25-pounders in action during the advance on 's-Hertogenbosch, 23 October 1944

After the failure of Market Garden, XII Corps was ordered to advance westwards towards 's-Hertogenbosch. The regiments left the Nijmegen area on 19 October and took up new gun positions. The attack on s'Hertogenbosch (Operation Alan) began at 6:30 on 22 October, the infantry of 160th Bde advancing behind a timed artillery programme, after which the guns moved forward. After two days' fighting, 158th Bde took up the attack, but it took two more days of house-to-house fighting supported by the artillery to clear the old town.

Next XII Corps was switched to clearing the country between the Wessem-Nederweert Canal and the Zig Canal as 21st Army Group closed up to the River Maas. On 14 November the corps carried out Operation Mallard to cross the Wessem Canal. Both regiments fired in support of 51st (Highland) Division's assault crossing (Operation Ascot), followed by 53rd (W) Division's own crossing (Operation Bristol) in the evening.

On 3 December the guns supported 15th (S) Division in Operation Guildford to clear the banks of the Maas up to Blerick, opposite Venlo. The Commanding Officer of the 133rd Field Regiment was responsible for firing a large-scale smokescreen, which was maintained for over 11 hours during the operation, which was described as 'textbook'. Further operations were halted by winter weather. On 20 January 1945 the division moved to the Eindhoven area to refit and train for a special operation. On the night of 4/5 February the gunners moved into concealed positions near Nijmegen.

==== Operation Veritable ====
The Battle of the Reichswald (Operation Veritable) opened at 5:00 on 8 February with the heaviest concentration of artillery employed by the British Army so far in the war. The bombardment hit enemy gun positions, HQs, and communications. After a pause and dummy attack at 07.40 to induce the Germans to man their guns, the Counter-battery fire was resumed and a barrage was laid down to protect the assaulting columns. At 10:30 the full barrage made its first lift and the advance began. Both regiments supported the advance of 71st Bde. By 15:00, 133rd Regiment was out of range, but it took over 2 hours to extract its guns from their muddy positions to move forward. 83rd Regiment also moved forward at 19:00. 53rd Division's objectives were the Brandenburg and Stoppelberg features in the northern part of the Reichswald. Opposition was not strong but the terrain was difficult. By 2:00 on 9 February the leading units were through the Siegfried Line defences and closing on the Stoppelberg. That feature was taken during the morning and the division pushed on to the edge of the forest, but it was hard to get guns and vehicles along the muddy forest tracks. The regiments deployed on German soil for the first time on 11 February. It took several days for the division to push on through Pfalzdorf towards Goch, mopping up opposition and fending off counter-attacks. Goch fell on 21 February.

53rd Division was not involved in the assault crossing of the Rhine (Operation Plunder) on 23/24 March, but it crossed on 26 March and the next day attacked through Hamminkeln to Dingden. It then took part in the drive to the Elbe. The German surrender at Lüneburg Heath, ending the fighting on 21st Army Group's front, came on 4 May.

83rd and 133rd (Welsh) Field Regiments were placed in suspended animation in British Army of the Rhine in 1946, on 21 June and 4 April respectively; when the TA was reformed on 1 January 1947 133rd was formally disbanded.

== Postwar ==
When the TA was reconstituted in 1947, the 83rd Field Regiment was reformed at Newport as 283rd (Welsh) Field Regiment in 53rd (Welsh) Division. In 1953 the title was changed to 283rd (Monmouthshire) Field Regiment.

On 10 March 1955 the regiment absorbed 603rd (1st Rifle Bn, The Monmouthshire Regiment) (Mixed) Heavy Anti-Aircraft Regiment at Newport, with the latter contributing P (1 Monmouthshire) Bty to the merger. On 1 May 1961 the regiment merged again, this time with two of the original field regiments of 53rd (W) Division, 281st (Glamorgan Yeomanry) Field Regiment and 282nd (Welsh) Heavy AA Regiment to form 282nd (Glamorgan and Monmouthshire) Field Regiment, with the following organisation:

- P (Glamorgan Yeomanry) Bty – from 281st Field Regiment
- Q (Welsh) Bty – from 282nd HAA Regiment
- R (1 Monmouth) Bty – from 283rd Field Regiment
- 509 (Motor Transport) Company, Royal Army Service Corps – from surplus personnel of 281st Field Regiment, 282nd HAA Regiment Workshop, Royal Electrical and Mechanical Engineers, and 533 Co Royal Army Service Corps

Finally, when the TA was reduced into the Territorial and Army Volunteer Reserve in 1967, the combined regiment became 211 (South Wales) Battery, Royal Artillery at Newport in 104 Light Air Defence Regiment, RA, with the following organisation:

- D (Monmouthshire) Troop at Newport
- E (Glamorgan Yeomanry) Troop at Cardiff
- F (Brecknockshire and Monmouthshire) Troop at Ebbw Vale

In 1986, 211 Bty provided a cadre for a new 217 (County of Gwent) Bty at Cwmbran, but this was absorbed by HQ Bty in 1992, when 211 Bty was reduced to:

- C (Glamorgan Yeomanry) Troop at Cardiff
- D (Brecknockshire and Monmouthshire) Troop at Abertillery.

211 (South Wales) Bty continues in 104th Regiment Royal Artillery (Volunteers) in the Army Reserve today, currently as a close support unit equipped with the L118 light gun.

== Honorary Colonels ==
The following served as Honorary Colonel of the unit:

- Charles Lyne, former CO, appointed (to 1st Worcester Admin Bde, and remained with Worcesters thereafter) 9 November 1878, died 1901.
- John Rolls, 1st Baron Llangattock, appointed (to 1st Monmouth) 4 October 1890
- C.T. Wallis, VD, former CO, appointed 13 June 1914
- Col W.C. Phillips, VD, appointed 31 March 1922
- Lt-Col T.W. Pearson, DSO, TD, appointed 19 September 1936

== Memorial ==
There is a brass plate bearing the names of 28 members of 83rd Field Regiment killed in the NW Europe campaign in St Peter's and St Paul's Church, East Sutton, near Maidstone in Kent.

== Sources ==
- Maj A.F. Becke,History of the Great War: Order of Battle of Divisions, Part 2a: The Territorial Force Mounted Divisions and the 1st-Line Territorial Force Divisions (42–56), London: HM Stationery Office, 1935/Uckfield: Naval & Military Press, 2007, ISBN 1-847347-39-8.
- Maj A.F. Becke,History of the Great War: Order of Battle of Divisions, Part 2b: The 2nd-Line Territorial Force Divisions (57th–69th), with the Home-Service Divisions (71st–73rd) and 74th and 75th Divisions, London: HM Stationery Office, 1937/Uckfield: Naval & Military Press, 2007, ISBN 1-847347-39-8.
- Maj A.F. Becke,History of the Great War: Order of Battle of Divisions, Part 3b: New Army Divisions (30–41) and 63rd (R.N.) Division, London: HM Stationery Office, 1939/Uckfield: Naval & Military Press, 2007, ISBN 1-847347-41-X.
- Ian F.W. Beckett, Riflemen Form: A Study of the Rifle Volunteer Movement 1859–1908, Aldershot: Ogilby Trusts, 1982, ISBN 0 85936 271 X.
- John Buckley, Monty's Men: The British Army and the Liberation of Europe, London: Yale University Press, 2013, ISBN 978-0-300-13449-0.
- Col John K. Dunlop, The Development of the British Army 1899–1914, London: Methuen, 1938.
- Major L.F. Ellis, History of the Second World War, United Kingdom Military Series: Victory in the West, Vol II: The Defeat of Germany, London: HM Stationery Office, 1968/Uckfield: Naval & Military, 2004, ISBN 1-845740-59-9.
- Gen Sir Martin Farndale, History of the Royal Regiment of Artillery: The Forgotten Fronts and the Home Base 1914–18, Woolwich: Royal Artillery Institution, 1988, ISBN 1-870114-05-1.
- Gen Sir Martin Farndale, History of the Royal Regiment of Artillery: The Years of Defeat: Europe and North Africa, 1939–1941, Woolwich: Royal Artillery Institution, 1988/London: Brasseys, 1996, ISBN 1-85753-080-2.
- J.B.M. Frederick, Lineage Book of British Land Forces 1660–1978, Vol I, Wakefield: Microform Academic, 1984, ISBN 1-85117-007-3.
- J.B.M. Frederick, Lineage Book of British Land Forces 1660–1978, Vol II, Wakefield: Microform Academic, 1984, ISBN 1-85117-009-X.
- Lt-Col H.F. Joslen, Orders of Battle, United Kingdom and Colonial Formations and Units in the Second World War, 1939–1945, London: HM Stationery Office, 1960/London: London Stamp Exchange, 1990, ISBN 0-948130-03-2/ Uckfield: Naval & Military Press, 2003, ISBN 1-843424-74-6.
- Norman E.H. Litchfield, The Territorial Artillery 1908–1988 (Their Lineage, Uniforms and Badges), Nottingham: Sherwood Press, 1992, ISBN 0-9508205-2-0.
- Norman Litchfield & Ray Westlake, The Volunteer Artillery 1859–1908 (Their Lineage, Uniforms and Badges), Nottingham: Sherwood Press, 1982, ISBN 0-9508205-0-4.
- Lt-Gen H.G. Martin, The History of the Fifteenth Scottish Division 1939–1945, Edinburgh: Blackwood, 1948/Uckfield: Naval & Military Press, 2014, ISBN 978-1-78331-085-2.
- Lt-Col J.D. Sainsbury, The Hertfordshire Yeomanry Regiments, Royal Artillery, Part 1: The Field Regiments 1920-1946, Welwyn: Hertfordshire Yeomanry and Artillery Trust/Hart Books, 1999, ISBN 0-948527-05-6.
- Edward M. Spiers, The Army and Society 1815–1914, London: Longmans, 1980, ISBN 0-582-48565-7.
- Maj C.H. Dudley Ward, History of the 53rd (Welsh) Division (T.F.) 1914–1918, Cardiff: Western Mail, 1927/Uckfield: Naval & Military, 2004, ISBN 978-1-845740-50-4.
- War Office, Titles and Designations of Formations and Units of the Territorial Army, London: War Office, 7 November 1927 (RA sections also summarised in Litchfield, Appendix IV).
- War Office, Army Council Instructions Issued During November 1916, London: HM Stationery Office, 1916.

=== External sources ===
- Mark Conrad, The British Army, 1914 (archive site)
- British Army units from 1945 on Archived 2015-08-29 at the Wayback Machine
- The Drill Hall Project
- Imperial War Museum, War Memorials Register
- The Long, Long Trail
- The Regimental Warpath 1914–1918 (archive site)
- Land Forces of Britain, the Empire and Commonwealth – Regiments.org (archive site)
- Graham Watson, The Territorial Army 1947 Archived 2021-12-09 at the Wayback Machine
