= Basil Engholm =

British civil servant

Sir Basil Charles Engholm (2 August 1912 – 12 June 1990) was a senior British civil servant at the Ministry of Agriculture. On retirement he was heavily involved in raising money for the arts, and was Chairman of the British Film Institute.

== Career ==
Engholm was born in Melbourne, Australia, the only son of Charles Engholm and his wife Ethel Nora Bowie. His father was of Swedish descent, and worked for the Anglo-American Metal Company in various parts of the world. Engholm returned to England and then went out to Chile at the age of 8, where he learnt to ride on his father’s ranch. He was educated at Tonbridge School, at the Sorbonne in Paris and Sidney Sussex College, Cambridge, where he took a Law Tripos and gained a double first. He became a member of Gray's Inn, and followed his father into the Anglo-American Metal Company in New York from 1933 to 1934. He did not like working for the company, and entered the British Civil Service in 1935. He was posted to the Ministry of Agriculture and Fisheries.

He rose in the Ministry of Agriculture where he stayed throughout his career until he reached the top job. He became Under Secretary 1954 and Deputy Secretary in 1964 when he was made CB. During his time at the Ministry he acquired a reputation as the right man to deal with difficult problems. He picked up the pieces in the Crichel Down affair and was heavily involved in the Icelandic Cod War. His diplomacy in these and other matters led to his appointment as Permanent Secretary in 1968 in succession to Sir John Winnifrith, and he was knighted (KCB) that year. While still a civil servant he and his wife found time to develop a great enthusiasm for the arts, including painting, theatre, ballet, film and opera.

== Retirement ==
Engholm retired from the Civil Service in 1973 and became a company director for Comfin Ltd until 1985. He had free time on his hands and put his energy into raising money for the arts. He was Chairman of British Film Institute from 1978 to 1981 and quickly recognised the need for commercial sponsorship of the arts. During his time as Chairman, the idea of the Museum of the Moving Image was generated. His greatest love was Sadler's Wells Theatre. He was a director of the Sadler's Wells Theatre Trust from 1975 and of the New Sadler's Wells Opera from 1987 to 1989. He was also a director of the Trustee Theatre Trust from 1977 to 1984.

== Personal life ==
In 1936, Engholm married Nancy Hewitt, daughter of Clifford Hewitt of Rye. They had a daughter born in 1943.

Government offices
Preceded by Sir John Winnifrith	Permanent Secretary of the Ministry of Agriculture, Fisheries and Food; 1967–1972	Succeeded by Sir Alan Neale
