= Donald Fergusson =

British civil servant (1891–1963)

Sir John Donald Balfour Fergusson, GCB (26 August 1891 – 4 March 1963), commonly known as Donald Fergusson, was a British civil servant who as Permanent Secretary of the Ministry of Agriculture had directed the Food Production Campaign during the Second World War.

== Early life ==
John Donald Balfour Fergusson was born on 26 August 1891 at Bebington, Cheshire, the son of the Reverend John Moore Fergusson, a Presbyterian minister, and Ethel Catherine Everett, née Evans. Fergusson was educated at Berkhamsted School and Magdalen College, Oxford. At the beginning of the First World War he commissioned into the Royal West Kent Regiment, later transferring to the 1/1st Hertfordshire Regiment, and saw active service on the Somme and at the Third Ypres.

== Civil Service ==
In 1919 he joined the Treasury and by 1934 was an Assistant Secretary, he served as a Private Secretary to Chancellors of the Exchequer including Winston Churchill. In 1936 he was promoted to Permanent Secretary at the Ministry of Agriculture where during the Second World War he was recognised for the planning and success of the scheme to increase food supplies and revitalise the countryside.

In 1945 he became the first Permanent Secretary of the Ministry of Fuel and Power where he wrestled with creating a new ministry with opposing interests from the coal, petroleum, gas and electricity industries. He had the burden of the 1947 fuel crisis and the nationalisation of both gas and electricity.

He retired in 1952 and became a director of the Prudential Assurance Company. He had married Phyllis Mary Cleverly in 1918 and they had three sons and a daughter; one son was killed in action in 1944. He died on 4 March 1963 in Salisbury, Wiltshire, aged 71.

Government offices
Preceded by Sir Charles John Howell Thomas	Permanent Secretary of the Ministry of Agriculture and Fisheries; 1936–1945	Succeeded by Sir Donald Vandepeer
