= Alan Hitchman =

English civil servant

Sir Edwin Alan Hitchman, KCB (16 November 1903 – 2 July 1980), commonly known as Alan Hitchman, was an English civil servant.

Educated at Downing College, Cambridge, the Sorbonne and the Ecole des Sciences Politiques, he entered the civil service and joined the Ministry of Labour, beginning in 1926 as a junior grade in the administrative class. He worked in the ministry during the Second World War.

In 1947, Hitchman was appointed a Companion of the Order of the Bath (CB) and moved to HM Treasury where he worked on plans for post-war reconstruction and was involved the devaluation of the pound. He was then Permanent Secretary of the new Ministry of Materials from 1950 to 1952 and was promoted to Knight Commander of the Order of the Bath (KCB) in 1952. That year, he was appointed Permanent Secretary of the Ministry of Agriculture and Fisheries, serving until 1955 when it became the Ministry of Agriculture, Fisheries and Food (MAFF); he was Permanent Secretary of this new ministry until 1959. From 1959, he sat on the United Kingdom Atomic Energy Authority, serving as its chairman from 1964 to 1966.

Government offices
Preceded by Sir Donald Vandepeer	Permanent Secretary of the Ministry of Agriculture and Fisheries (Ministry of Agriculture, Fisheries and Food from 1955); 1952–1959	Succeeded by Sir John Winnifrith
