= Chaouach =

Village in Béja Governorate, Tunisia

Coordinates: 36°42′42″N 9°32′24″E

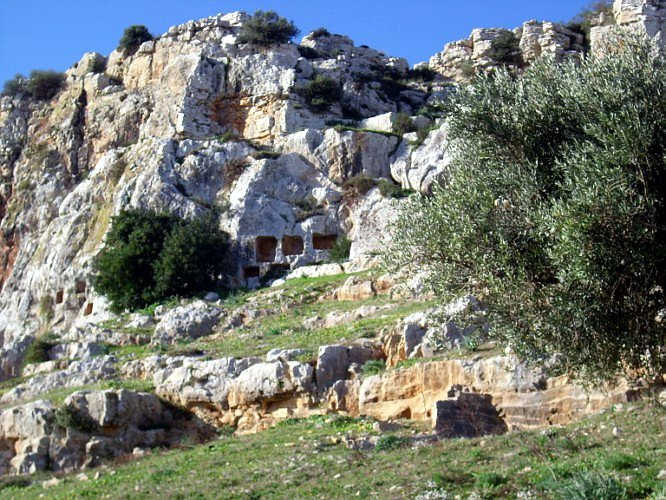
Haouanet at Chaouach

Chaouach is a village in Béja Governorate, Tunisia. It is located between Béja and Tunis and north of Medjez-El-Bab (36° 42' 42" N, 9° 32' 24" E). The area sits in a valley high up the sides of the watershed of the Medjerda river. In antiquity, it was a Roman Catholic diocese.

== History ==
=== Antiquity ===
Chaouach is known for its extensive haouanet ( حانوت ). These tombs are presumably of Numidian origin, used until the time of the Roman presence in North Africa.

There was from 330 BC to AD 640 a Roman settlement at Chaouach was called Suas. Suas was a civitas of the Roman province of Africa Proconsolare, though larger than its near neighbor Toukabeur.

=== Modern history ===
During the Tunisian Campaign of World War II, the town was an important strategic site being on the heights overlooking the Medjerda River valley with several large towns to the south. The town was taken in April 1943, by the British Army's, Lancashire Fusiliers and the Queen's Own East Surrey Regiment.

General Sir Kenneth Anderson wrote of Chaouch at this time,

This mountain land is a vast tract of country, every hill in which is large enough to swallow up a brigade of infantry, where consolidation on the rocky slopes is very difficult, in which tanks can only operate in small numbers, where movement of guns and vehicles is very restricted and where the division had to rely on pack mules for its supplies and to carry wireless telegraphy sets, tools and mortars.

== Bishopric ==
In antiquity the town was also the seat of an ancient Catholic episcopal see, a suffragan of the Archdiocese of Carthage. That diocese survives today as titular bishopric and the current bishop is Józef Wróbel.
