= Medjez-El-Bab Memorial =

- Commonwealth War Graves Commission
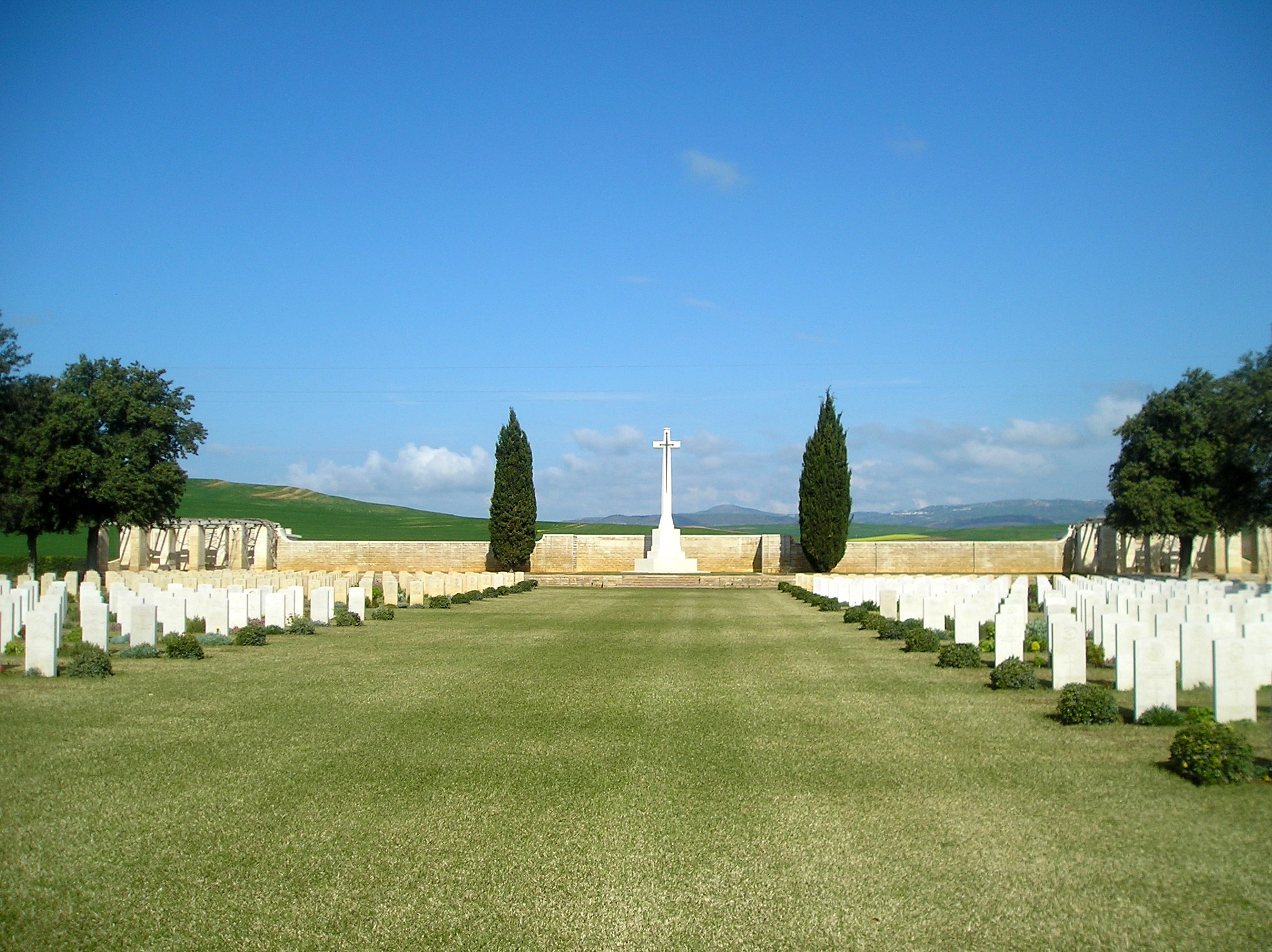
- For men of the First Army who died during the operations in Algeria and Tunisia between 8 November 1942 and 19 February 1943, and those of the First and Eighth Armies who died in operations in the same areas between 20 February 1943 and 13 May 1943, and who have no known graves
- Location: near Majaz al Bab, Tunisia
- Commemorated: 1954

The Medjez-El-Bab Memorial is a Commonwealth War Graves Commission war memorial in the Medjez-el-Bab War Cemetery near Majaz al Bab, Tunisia. The memorial commemorates 2,525 Commonwealth forces members who died in Tunisia and Algeria during World War II and have no known grave.
