= Donald Vandepeer =

English civil servant

Sir Donald Edward Vandepeer, KCB, KBE (21 September 1890 – 6 October 1968) was an English civil servant. Educated at University of London, he entered the civil service in 1908 and joined the Ministry of Agriculture and Fisheries; he was Permanent Secretary of the Ministry from 1945 to 1952. He led the British delegation to the United Nation Food and Agricultural Organisation's conferences.

Government offices
Preceded by Sir Donald Fergusson	Permanent Secretary of the Ministry of Agriculture and Fisheries; 1945–1952	Succeeded by Sir Alan Hitchman
