= Majaz al Bab =

Medjezz El Bab Membrossa
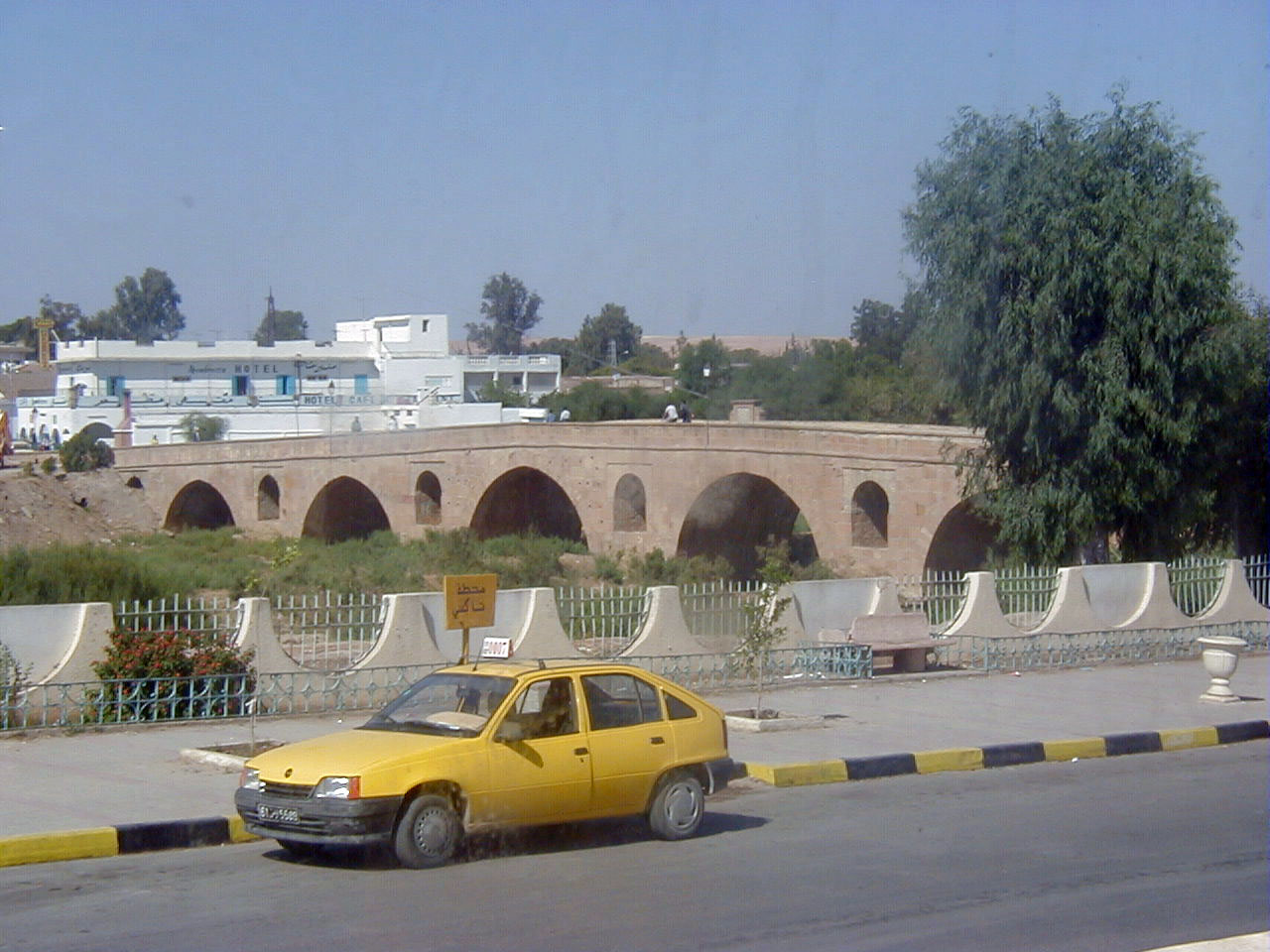
- Bridge over the Medjerda River

- Location in Tunisia
- Coordinates: 36°38′37″N 9°36′15″E
- Country: Tunisia
- Governorate: Béja Governorate

Population (2022)
  - Total: 24,100
- Time zone: UTC1 (CET)

Majaz al Bab (Arabic: مجاز الباب), also known as Medjez el Bab, or as Membressa under the Roman Empire, is a town in northern Tunisia. It is located at the intersection of roads GP5 and GP6, in the Plaine de la Medjerda.

It has been a titular see of the Catholic Church since 1933.

== Commonwealth war grave site ==
There is a Commonwealth War Grave site at Majaz al Bab, largely dedicated to those who fell during the North African campaign, including Operation Torch and the Tunisia Campaign, during World War II.

The Medjez-El-Bab Memorial commemorates almost 2,000 men of the British First Army who died during the operations in Algeria and Tunisia between 8 November 1942 and 19 February 1943, and those of the British First and British Eighth Armies who died in operations in the same areas between 20 February and 13 May 1943, and who have no known graves. The memorial stands within Medjez-El-Bab War Cemetery where 2,903 Commonwealth servicemen of the Second World War are buried or commemorated. 385 of the burials are unidentified. Special memorials commemorate three soldiers buried in Tunis (Borgel) Cemetery and one in Youks-les-Bains Cemetery, whose graves are now lost. The five First World War burials in Medjez-el-Bab War Cemetery were brought in from Tunis (Belvedere) Cemetery or Carthage (Basilica Karita) Cemetery in 1950.

== Haouanet ==
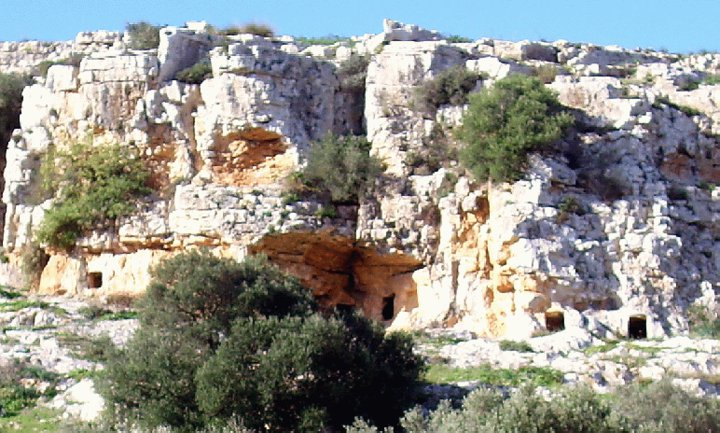
File:Chaouach at Majaz al bab

The haouanet at Majaz al Bab are extensive. Haouanet (plural of the word hanout (حانوت), which means "shop" in Arabic) are ancient sepulchral chambers hollowed out of the rock. Of approximately cubic form, and 1.25 to 2.50 meters long, with an entrance of almost constant dimension of 1.80 meters by 60 centimeters, they are found mainly in Tunisia and the eastern regions of Algeria. These burials, with one or more funeral chambers, sometimes had interior fittings (bench or pit). Presumably of Numidian origin, the haouanet were used until the Roman Empire.

== Antiquity ==
During the Roman Empire Majaz al Bab was a civitas of the Roman province of Africa Proconsolaris called Membressa, and was the site of the Battle of the Bagradas River (536) where the Byzantine general Belisarius was victorious over the rebel Stotzas. It was also the seat of a Christian Bishopric; a Bishop Victor attended the Concilium Lateranense in 649.

There was also a Roman settlement at Chaouach outside of Medjez-El-Bab called Suas. During the Roman Empire this part of the Medjerda river valley had a high density of bishoprics, with four other bishops resident within 10 kilometers of the Majaz al Bab.

== Titular bishops ==
- John Aloysius Morgan (1969–2008)
- Waldemar Passini Dalbello (2009–2014)
- Fernand J. Cheri (2015–2023)

== Population ==
2014 Census (Municipal)
Homes	Families	Males	Females	Total
6574	5664	10774	10879	21653
