= Royal Carmarthen Militia =

Welsh auxiliary unit of the British Army

Carmarthenshire Militia Royal Carmarthen Fusiliers Royal Carmarthen Artillery
- Active: 1661–21 October 1909
- Country: England (1661–1707); Kingdom of Great Britain (1707–1800); United Kingdom (1801–1909)
- Branch: Militia
- Role: Infantry; Garrison Artillery
- Size: Regiment
- Garrison/HQ: Carmarthen

The Carmarthenshire Militia, later the Royal Carmarthen Fusiliers, was an auxiliary (Note: It is incorrect to describe the British Militia as 'irregular': throughout their history they were equipped and trained exactly like the line regiments of the regular army, and once embodied in time of war they were fulltime professional soldiers for the duration of their enlistment.) regiment reorganised from earlier precursor units in the Welsh county of Carmarthenshire during the 18th Century. Primarily intended for home defence, it served in Britain and Ireland through all Britain's major wars. It was converted into garrison artillery in 1861 and continued until it was disbanded in 1909.

== Carmarthen Trained Bands ==
The universal obligation to military service in the Shire levy was long established in England and was extended to Wales. King Henry VIII called a 'Great Muster' in 1539, which showed 3865 men available for service in the County of Carmarthenshire, of whom 753 had 'harness' (armour), and 184 had 'nags' (horses).

The legal basis of the militia was updated by two acts of 1557 covering musters (4 & 5 Ph. & M. c. 3) and the maintenance of horses and armour (4 & 5 Ph. & M. c. 2). The county militia was now under the Lord Lieutenant, assisted by the Deputy Lieutenants and Justices of the Peace (JPs). The entry into force of these Acts in 1558 is seen as the starting date for the organised Militia of England and Wales. Although the militia obligation was universal, it was clearly impractical to train and equip every able-bodied man, so after 1572 the practice was to select a proportion of men for the Trained Bands, who were mustered for regular training.

During the Armada crisis of 1588 Carmarthenshire had 300 trained foot in bands under captains, and 404 untrained (of whom 300 served as 'pioneers'), together with 15 light horse and 30 'petronel's (the petronel was an early cavalry firearm).

In the 16th Century little distinction was made between the militia and the troops levied by the counties for overseas expeditions. However, the counties usually conscripted the unemployed and criminals rather than send the trained bandsmen. Between 1585 and 1602 Carmarthenshire supplied 960 men for service in Ireland and 30 for the Netherlands. The men were given three days' 'conduct money' to get to Chester or Bristol, the main ports of embarkation for Ireland. Conduct money was recovered from the government, but replacing the weapons issued to the levies from the militia armouries was a heavy cost on the counties.

With the passing of the threat of invasion, the trained bands declined in the early 17th Century. Later, King Charles I attempted to reform them into a national force or 'Perfect Militia' answering to the king rather than local control. The Carmarthen Trained Bands of 1638 consisted of 550 men, 220 armed with muskets and 330 'Corslets' (body armour, signifying pikemen). They also mustered 35 horse. Carmarthenshire was ordered to send 250 men overland to Newcastle upon Tyne for the Second Bishops' War of 1640. However, substitution was rife and many of those sent on this unpopular service would have been untrained replacements.

=== Civil Wars ===
Control of the militia was one of the areas of dispute between Charles I and Parliament that led to the English Civil War. When open war broke out between the King and Parliament, neither side made much use of the trained bands beyond securing the county armouries for their own full-time troops. Most of Wales was under Royalist control for much of the war, and was a recruiting ground for the King's armies. In October and November 1642 the Earl of Carbery and his Vaughan relatives seized the Carmarthenshire Trained Bands arms for the Royalists and levied 15 shillings from each trained bandsmen to pay for volunteer foot for the Royalist forces.

Once Parliament had established full control in 1648 it passed new Militia Acts that replaced lords lieutenant with county commissioners appointed by Parliament or the Council of State. At the same time the term 'Trained Band' began to disappear in most counties. Under the Commonwealth and Protectorate the militia received pay when called out, and operated alongside the New Model Army to control the country. By 1651 the militias of the South Welsh counties appear to have been combined, with the 'South Wales Militia' being ordered to rendezvous at Gloucester to hold the city during the Worcester campaign.

== Carmarthenshire Militia ==
After the Restoration of the Monarchy, the Militia was re-established by The King's Sole Right over the Militia Act 1661 under the control of the king's lords lieutenant, the men to be selected by ballot. This was popularly seen as the 'Constitutional Force' to counterbalance a 'Standing Army' tainted by association with the New Model Army that had supported Cromwell's military dictatorship.

The militia forces in the Welsh counties were small, and were grouped together under the direction of the Lord President of the Council of Wales. As Lord President, the Duke of Beaufort carried out a tour of inspection of the Welsh militia in 1684, when the Cardiganshire (Note: There was no consistency in whether 'Carmarthen' or 'Carmarthenshire' was used for the unit's titles, though 'shire' was generally dropped in the 19th Century.) Militia consisted of one Troop of horse and a Regiment of Foot commanded by Colonel Sir Rice Williams. The 1697 militia returns showed the Regiment of Foot as 341 strong under Col Rowland Groyn and the Troop of Horse as 40 men under Captain Thomas Cornwallis.

Generally the militia declined in the long peace after the Treaty of Utrecht in 1713. Jacobites were numerous amongst the Welsh Militia, but they did not show their hands during the Risings of 1715 and 1745, and bloodshed was avoided.

== 1757 reforms ==
=== Seven Years' War ===
Under threat of French invasion during the Seven Years' War a series of Militia Acts from 1757 re-established county militia regiments, the men being conscripted by means of parish ballots (paid substitutes were permitted) to serve for three years. There was a property qualification for officers, who were commissioned by the lord lieutenant. An adjutant and drill sergeants were to be provided to each regiment from the Regular Army, and arms and accoutrements would be supplied when the county had secured 60 per cent of its quota of recruits.

Carmarthenshire was given a quota of 200 men to raise. Some of the Welsh counties were slow to complete their regiments: the problem was less with the other ranks raised by ballot than the shortage of men qualified to be officers, even after the requirements were lowered for Welsh counties. Nevertheless, the Carmarthenshire regiment was the first to be formed in Wales, receiving its arms on 3 July 1759 and assembling at Llandeilo for a short training period. It was embodied for permanent service on 8 December that year under the command of Col George Rice, of Llandeilo fawr, MP and Lord Lieutenant of Carmarthenshire.

The regiment was first posted to neighbouring Pembrokeshire, where detachments were stationed at Pembroke Town and Tenby. On 26 May 1761 it moved to north Devon, where from its headquarters (HQ) at Bideford it was employed with other militia regiments in guarding and escorting French prisoners-of-war. On 24 October it marched back from Torrington to Carmarthen, where it stayed until June 1762. On 12 June it marched to Haverfordwest, with detachments across Pembrokeshire until it returned to Carmarthen at the end of November. The war was now ending and on 3 December 1762 the regiment was dispersed, with detachments marching home to the main balloting centres such as Llandeilo and Llanelli to be disembodied. The regiment was kept up to strength by means of the ballot over subsequent years, but it was rarely assembled for training.

=== American War of Independence ===
The American War of Independence broke out in 1775, and by 1778 Britain was threatened with invasion by the Americans' allies, France and Spain. The militia were embodied, and the Carmarthens were called out on 27 March. They mustered by companies at the main balloting centres, then concentrated at Carmarthen before marching off to Hereford on 17 and 19 June. A company was detached to Swansea on 31 July, then the whole regiment marched to join the Bristol garrison in August 1778. In December 1779 the regiment moved to Monmouth where it was reinforced by a draft of freshly-balloted men. Three months later it was increased by the arrival of a company of volunteers, recruited by means of a bounty paid for by public subscription. This brought the full strength of the regiment up to 360. In February 1780 the main body of the regiment moved to Chepstow, leaving a detachment at Monmouth.

Following the death of Col Rice in 1779, Thomas Johnes of Hafod, MP, was appointed colonel commandant of the Carmarthen Militia on 1 March 1780, with Capt John Ravenscroft promoted to lieutenant-colonel and second-in-command. In June 1780 the regiment crossed the River Severn, marching via Bristol to join the garrison of Plymouth. In October it moved to Falmouth, Cornwall, but was immediately recalled to Hereford where it spent the winter. In February 1781 it was reinforced to 320 strong by a further draft from Carmarthen and the following month began a march via Tiverton, Devon to east Cornwall where it spent the summer as part of a militia brigade camped on Maker heights overlooking Plymouth Sound. While there the Carmarthens provided men to assist the gunners in the Maker Batteries then under construction. In October the regiment marched to Barnstaple in north Devon where it took up winter quarters, with detachments at Bideford and other places. In February 1782, men who had completed their five-year terms of service were released and replaced by men freshly balloted or their paid substitutes. In June the regiment returned to Plymouth for a short period of duty before moving into Dorset. By November it was quartered for the winter with detachments at Poole, Wimborne, and later at Christchurch in Hampshire. Here it was reinforced by a draft of recruits for the volunteer company. The Treaty of Paris ended hostilities in 1783, and the militia was stood down in February. The regiment marched back to Carmarthen where it was disembodied in March.

From 1784 to 1792 the militia ballot was used to keep up the numbers and the regiments were assembled for their 28 days' annual peacetime training, but to save money only two-thirds of the men were actually mustered each year.

=== French Revolutionary War ===
The militia was already being embodied when Revolutionary France declared war on Britain on 1 February 1793. The Carmarthen Militia was assembled at Carmarthen under Col Johnes on 11 January. The strength of the regiment had reverted to its establishment of 200 men in three companies, which was considered a major's command; however, in common with a number of other militia colonels, Johnes was commissioned as a Brevet Colonel in the Army on 18 March 1794.

The French Revolutionary Wars saw a new phase for the English militia: they were embodied for a whole generation, and became regiments of full-time professional soldiers (though restricted to service in the British Isles), which the regular army increasingly saw as a prime source of recruits. They served in coast defences, manning garrisons, guarding prisoners of war, and for internal security, while their traditional local defence duties were taken over by the Volunteers and mounted Yeomanry.

On the outbreak of war the regiment was under orders for Bristol, but these were cancelled and it was sent to Swansea to aid the civil power in suppressing bread riots. In April it sent a company to Pembroke to guard prisoners of war and in October a further company went to Tenby, and by May 1794 the whole regiment was in Pembrokeshire with a detachment at Haverfordwest. 1795 saw a wave of food riots across Wales, and in February the Haverfordwest company had to send a detachment to Narberth to assist the magistrates, and on 1 March two companies had to go to Aberystwyth. In August the regiment had to support the magistrates at Carmarthen, and there was a serious outbreak at Haverfordwest on 18 August, where a cordon of 50 men of the regiment prevented miners and their wives from looting a food ship. The reading of the Riot Act had no effect, and the rioters only dispersed after the militia loaded their muskets and made ready to fire. The detachment remained on duty until it was relieved by the Fishguard and Newport Volunteers next day. Later in the year the two companies at Aberystwyth were deployed to assist Revenue officers in suppressing smuggling. In May 1796 the regiment was ordered to Whitehaven in Cumberland to relieve the Cardigan Militia: the detached companies were concentrated at Welshpool and began the march on 16 May. By the following May it was billeted in inns and lodging houses with regimental HQ at Whitehaven and detachments at Ulverston and elsewhere.

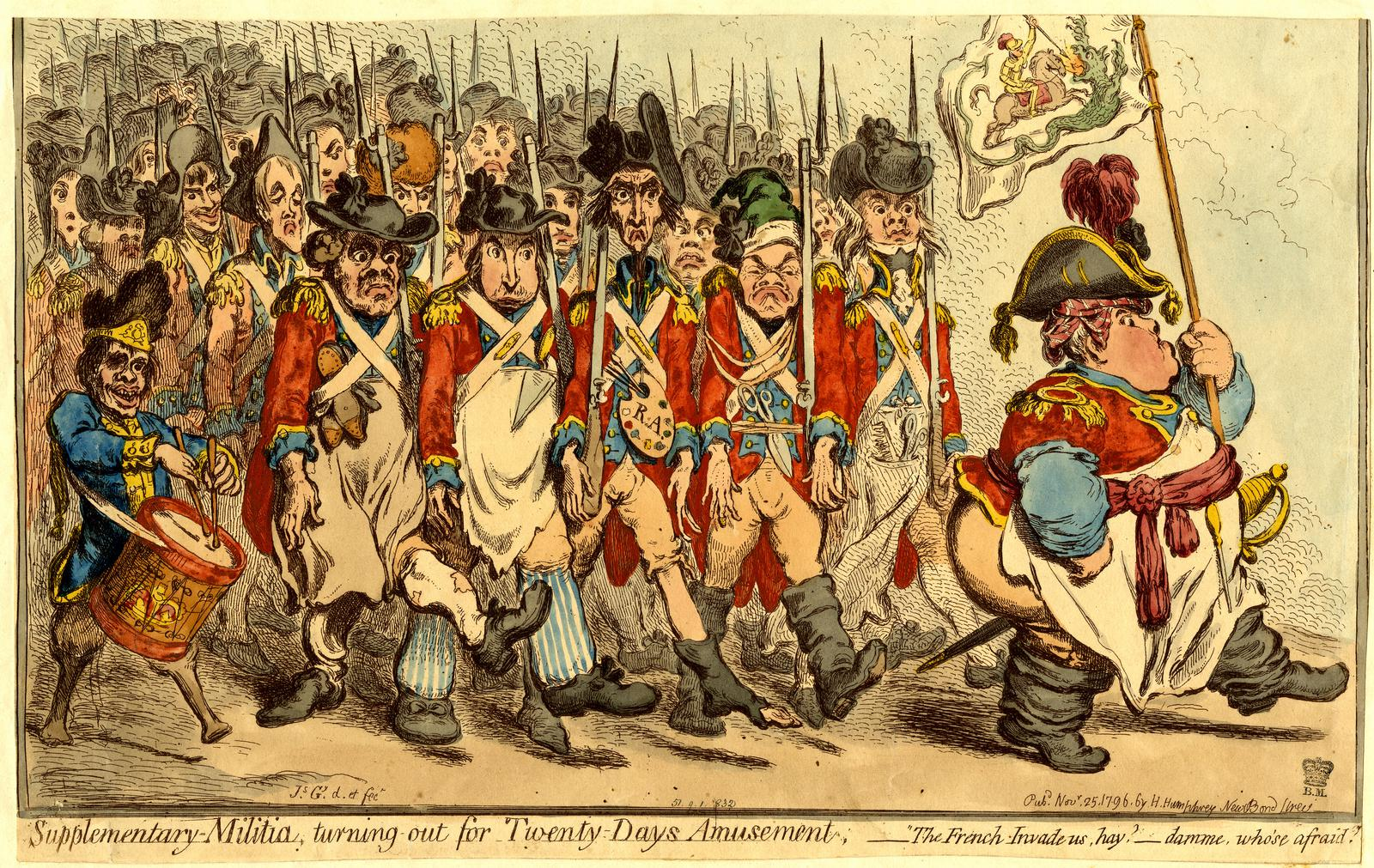
Supplementary-Militia, turning-out for Twenty Days Amusement: 1796 caricature by James Gillray.

In a fresh attempt to have as many men as possible under arms for home defence in order to release regulars, in 1796 the Government created the Supplementary Militia, a compulsory levy of men to be trained in their spare time, and to be incorporated in the Regular Militia in emergency. Carmarthenshire's new militia quota was fixed at 790 men, ie 590 supplementaries were to be raised. In fact the county's quota was less burdensome than the average county: in 1796 only one man in 30 was required, whereas most counties had to supply one in 12–18. Part of the Carmarthen Supplementary Militia was embodied at Carmarthen on 20 February 1798: 263 muskets were delivered, additional officers were commissioned, and a number of serving militiamen were promoted to provide the non-commissioned officers. A second 'division' was called out for training in April.

=== Ireland ===
Meanwhile, the Interchange Act 1811 passed in July allowed English militia regiments to serve in Ireland and vice versa. In Col Johnes's absence (and to his later disapproval), Lt-Col Ravenscroft volunteered the Carmarthens, which were thus one of the first 13 militia regiments to serve there. The regiment marched from Whitehaven to Liverpool to await embarkation. However, on arrival from training at Llandovery and Llandeilo many of the supplementaries declared that they were not prepared to cross to Ireland. While the main body of the regiment embarked for Dublin on 30 June with 404 privates (178 of them supplementaries), the rest of the Carmarthen supplementaries were marched to Ormskirk. However, en route to Ormskirk some 200 of the supplementaries mutinied. They were overawed when the garrison was drawn up, with cavalry and artillery, but several of the mutineers were tried by Court-martial. The 'Old Militia's' tour of duty in Ireland had to be cut short and it re-embarked for Liverpool at the end of July, though every man was given a gilt medal on an orange ribbon by the City of Dublin as a mark of appreciation for having volunteered.

The regiment marched from Liverpool to Warrington, where the supplementaries came in from Wigan and the united regiment, now 20 officers and 830 other ranks strong, continued its march to Chelmsford in Essex. It spent the winter in East Anglia, with regimental HQ at Chelmsford and detachments widely spread. Colonel Johnes had been succeeded in command by Col Lord Cawdor from the Pembrokeshire Yeomanry, who had defeated the French at the Battle of Fishguard the previous year, with Lt-Col Ravenscroft remaining as second-in-command.

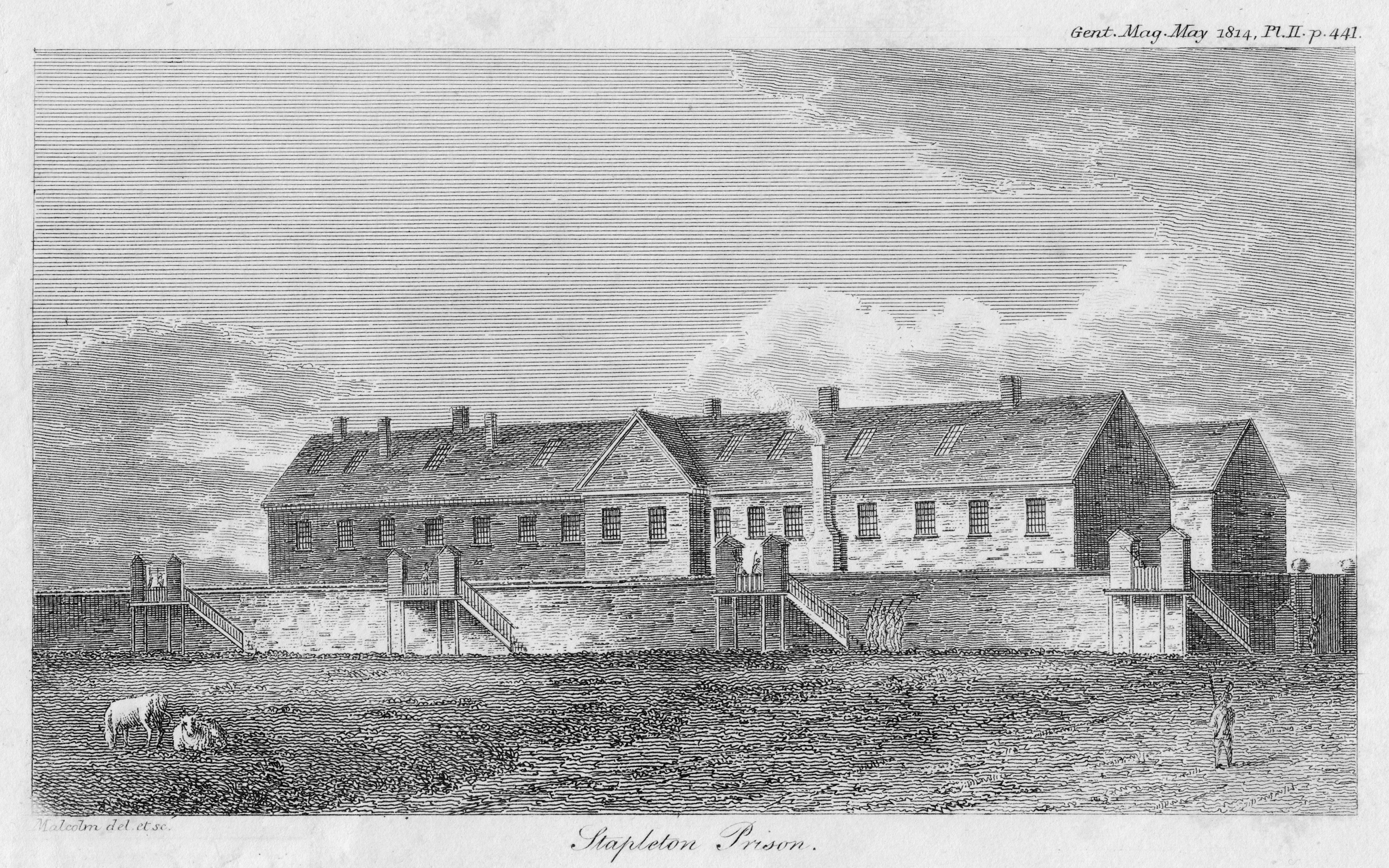
Stapleton Prison in 1814.

At the beginning of 1799 the regiment again volunteered for service in Ireland, apparently in an attempt to restore its reputation. In May it was ordered to Gosport in Hampshire to await transport. While the regiment was there, detachments did duty at Botley and at Parkhurst, Isle of Wight. In June an Act of Parliament reduced the quotas for Supplementary Militia and encouraged them to volunteer for the Regular Army. In October the reduced regiment embarked under Lord Cawdor at Portsmouth as part of a large militia draft aboard the transports Dictator, Diadem Romulus and Stately. By December 1799 the regiment was stationed at Waterford, moving to Dublin in February 1800. In November 1800 it returned to Wales, at Milford Haven with detachments at Haverfordwest and Pembroke Dock. In July 1801 it relieved the Lancashire Militia in the Bristol, Garrison, where the duties included guarding prisoners-of-war at Stapleton Prison and manning the Avonmouth forts. By December it was serving at Exeter, but then marched back to South Wales, where in January 802 for companies went to Carmarthen and two to Llandeilo. The Treaty of Amiens was signed in March 1802 and in April warrants were issued to disembody the militia.

=== Napoleonic Wars ===
However, the Peace of Amiens was short-lived and the Carmarthen militia were re-embodied in March 1803 before marching off to Hampshire to do duty at Winchester. In July it was part of a militia brigade in camp at Stokes Bay, Gosport, where it was joined by a draft of supplementary militiamen from Carmarthen to increase its strength. The duties included boat and hospital guards round Gosport and Haslar, guarding prisoners-of-war, and manning Fort Blockhouse. In August the regiment moved across Portsmouth Harbour to the Portsmouth side, where it camped on Southsea Common, with detachments in Fort Cumberland and guarding prisoners-of-war at Portchester Castle. It then moved into winter quarters in Hilsea Barracks, providing sentries for Portsmouth town and the naval dockyard and arsenal, as well as manning Southsea Fort.

Since 1799 the regiment had been unofficially calling itself the 'Royal Carmarthen', but on 23 April 1804 it along with 11 other Welsh militia regiments was officially granted the 'Royal' prefix, becoming the Royal Carmarthen Fuzileers (Fusiliers).

In May 1804 the regiment returned to duties in Pembrokeshire, with its HQ at Haverfordwest. At this period it parade with a small train of artillery (probably a pair of 'battalion guns'). In mid-June it marched to Exeter, and then to Bristol, where it provided guards for Stapleton prison. During the summer of 1805, when Napoleon was massing his 'Army of England' at Boulogne for a projected invasion, the Royal Carmarthens, with 508 men in eight companies under Lt-Col William Owen Brigstocke, were still stationed at Bristol as part of a brigade under Maj-Gen Josiah Champagné.

In May 1806 the regiment returned to Haverfordwest to relieve the Rutland Militia, leaving one company at Bristol. By January 1807 it had detachments at Tenby, Narberth, Milford Haven, and Aberystwyth, and was manning invasion warning beacons along the coast. In May that year it called in its detachments and was sent to Swansea to embark for crossing the Bristol Channel to Devon, reaching Kingsbridge Barracks on 24 June. In September newly balloted men arrived from Carmarthento replace those who had volunteered for regiments of the line. In October it marched to Plymouth where it spent the winter on prisoner-of-war duties at Mill Prison. By March 1808 it was back in the Bristol Garrison, then in July 1809 it was ordered to the north of England, first at Darlington, then alternating between Sunderland and Tynemouth Barracks in 1810–12.

In October 1812 the regiment moved to Manchester, where it again volunteered for service in Ireland. In May 1813 it marched to Liverpool for the crossing, and was then stationed at Mullingar. In December it moved to Granard, then in March 1814 it was in Cavan with detachments in nearby towns and villages. It moved on to Longford in September, and then to Newry. Napoleon had abdicated in April and the war ended, so the militia were being stood down. The regiment embarked for Liverpool on 2 October aboard the transports Mary, Conrad and Albion, disembarking on 12 October and beginning the march to Wales. Having reached Milford Haven in November it was diverted to Bristol by sea, arriving by December. The regiment had still not been disembodied when Napoleon escaped from Elba in March 1815 and hostilities were resumed. In May the Royal Carmarthen Fusiliers had to send a recruiting party to Carmarthenshire to try to find men to replace those who had transferred to the regulars or were time-expired. Soon after Napoleon's final defeat at Waterloo the whole regiment was sent back, taking up quarters in Lampeter, Aberystwyth and Milford Haven, with HQ at Kidwelly. In December the regiment concentrated at Carmarthen and Aberystwyth, and was disembodied on 31 January 1816 (21 February for the Aberystwyth detachment).

=== Long Peace ===
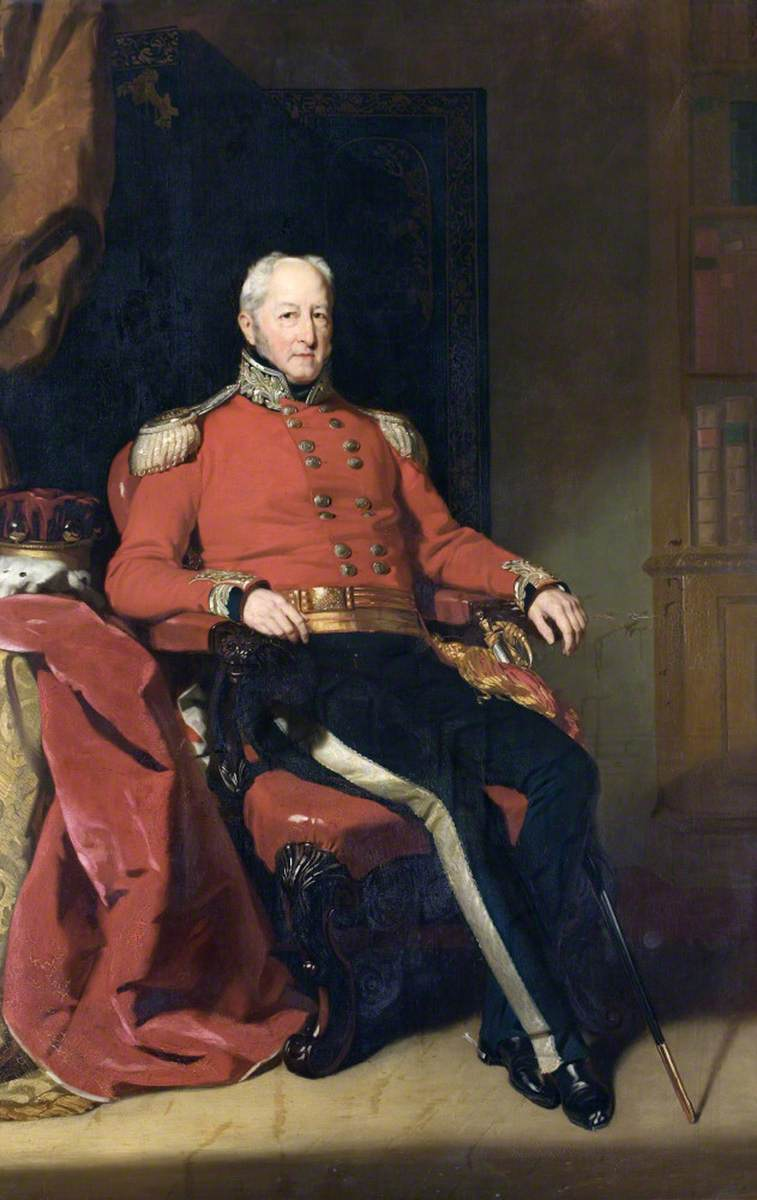
Colonel George Rice-Trevor (1795–1869), 4th Baron Dynevor, by John Lucas (National Trust).

After Waterloo there was another long peace. The permanent staff of the Royal Carmarthen Fusiliers were called out in October 1816 and issued with live ammunition to defend the barracks at Brecon against a threat of attack by discontented workers from Merthyr Tydfil; they were stood down after four days. The drummers were armed and held in readiness by the magistrates in 1818 when there were fears of a food riot at Carmarthen quay. However, although officers continued to be commissioned into the militia and ballots were still occasionally held, militia regiments were rarely assembled for training and the permanent staffs of sergeants and drummers were progressively reduced. The band of the Royal Carmarthen Fusiliers was maintained at the expense of the officers.

The Hon George Rice-Trevor, MP for Carmarthenshire, (later 4th Baron Dynevor), grandson of Col George Rice, was appointed Lt-Col Commandant of the regiment on 28 January 1831. In view of civil disturbances in Wales, the regiment had just been called out for training to begin in February (the last time the ballot was enforced), but no proper regimental clothing was available and the weapons had been returned to store, so training was ineffective. The permanent staff were called out during the Carmarthen Reform Act riots of 1831 and 1832, being badly stoned by rioters in the latter year. When the Rebecca Riots of 1843–44 reached Carmarthenshire Col Rice-Trevor was threatened, but the situation was dealt with by police and regular troops.

== 1852 Reforms ==
The Militia of the United Kingdom was revived by the Militia Act 1852, enacted during a period of international tension. As before, units were raised and administered on a county basis, and filled by voluntary enlistment (although conscription by means of the Militia Ballot might be used if the counties failed to meet their quotas). Training was for 56 days on enlistment, then for 21–28 days per year, during which the men received full army pay. Under the Act, Militia units could be embodied by Royal Proclamation for full-time home defence service in three circumstances:

1. 'Whenever a state of war exists between Her Majesty and any foreign power'.
2. 'In all cases of invasion or upon imminent danger thereof'.
3. 'In all cases of rebellion or insurrection'.

The Carmarthenshire Militia was revived in 1852 under the title Royal Carmarthen Rifles, with a new establishment of 547 privates. However, recruitment was difficult in Carmarthenshire because of opposition from the Non-conformist churches and the inability of many of the recruiting sergeants to speak Welsh. Even after some men were enlisted from outside the county, only 100 men had been raised by the time the regiment was assembled under Lord Dynevor at Carmarthen for training on 24 October 1853. The following year the strength reached 200, who could be accommodated in Carmarthen Barracks rather than being billeted on the town. The regiment was not embodied during the Crimean War, but carried out an extended (56 day) training period in 1855 and supplied a number of volunteers to the regular army. The strength had fallen to 170 men by the time of the 1856 training, and 150 by 1858.

=== Royal Carmarthen and Pembroke Artillery ===
In 1861 the War Office decided to amalgamate the small Welsh county militia contingents into larger regiments. The 1852 Act had introduced Artillery Militia units in addition to the traditional infantry regiments. Their role was to man coastal defences and fortifications, relieving the Royal Artillery (RA) for active service. One of the regiments converted in 1853 had been the Royal Pembroke Rifles, Now the decision was made to convert the Royal Carmarthen Rifles to artillery and amalgamate it with the Royal Pembroke Artillery. In June 1861 the Royal Carmarthen and Pembroke Artillery Militia came into being. The two contingents retained their HQs and stores at Carmarthen and Haverfordwest, the Carmarthen establishment being set at 385 gunners organised into four batteries. Sir James Williams-Drummond remained joint lt-col-cmdt with Sir Hugh Owen Owen, 2nd Baronet, of the Pembrokes. The infantry adjutant and drill sergeants of the permanent staff were replaced by artillerymen. On 12 August 1861 Lord Dynevor retired from the command to become Honorary Colonel of the combined regiment, and Sir James Williams-Drummond, 3rd Baronet, a former officer in the Grenadier Guards, was appointed Lt-Col Commandant of its Carmarthen contingent.

=== Royal Carmarthen Artillery ===
The Carmarthen batteries assembled for their first training on 19 October 1861. Most of this was carried out at Carmarthen barracks, where two drill guns had been installed, but a battery of 64-pounder rifled muzzle-loaders was being installed at Ferryside on the Tywi Estuary. In future years these were used for live firing practice against targets erected on the mud flats or moored on the water. The strength of the Carmarthen batteries, 220 effectives in 1862, slowly increased to complete establishment in 1867, and had reached 497 in 1870. In 1871 the Carmarthen contingent regained its independence as the Royal Carmarthen Artillery, with 509 effectives out of a new establishment of 600 men.

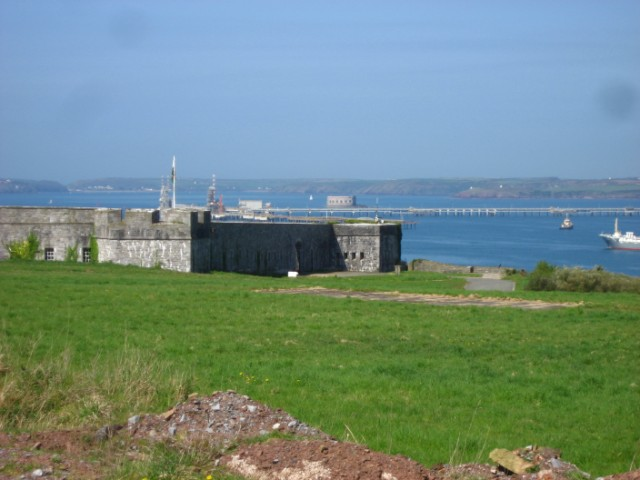
View from Popton Fort, looking out towards Milford Haven with Stack Rock Fort in the centre distance.

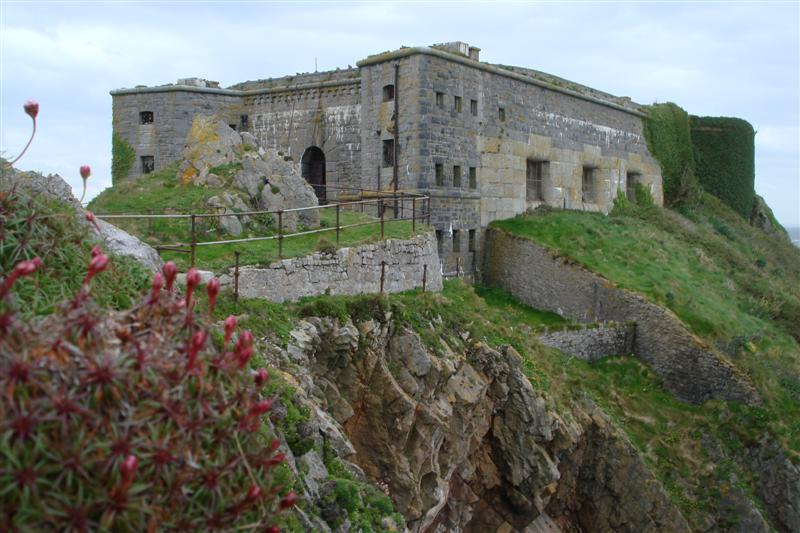
St Catherine's Fort on St Catherine's Island next to Castle Rock.

The Militia Reserve introduced in 1867 consisted of present and former militiamen who undertook to serve overseas in case of war. From 1871 the militia came under the War Office rather than their county lords lieutenant. Around a third of the recruits and many young officers went on to join the regular army. Following the Cardwell Reforms a mobilisation scheme began to appear in the Army List from December 1875. This assigned places in an order of battle of the 'Garrison Army' to militia artillery units: the Royal Carmarthen Artillery's war station was at Pembroke, including Stack Rock Fort, South Hook Fort, Popton Fort, Fort Hubberstone, West Blockhouse Fort, Thorne Island, Scoveston Fort, Mumbles (Swansea) and St Catherine's Fort (Tenby).

The Royal Artillery and Militia Artillery were reorganised on 14 April 1882, when 11 territorial divisions of garrison artillery were formed, each consisting of a number of brigades. (Note: In contemporary Royal Artillery terminology, a 'brigade' was a group of batteries grouped together for administrative rather than tactical purposes, the officer in command normally being a lieutenant-colonel rather than a brigadier-general or major-general, the ranks usually associated with command of an infantry or cavalry brigade.) In each division the 1st Brigade was composed of Regular RA batteries, the others being a varying number of militia corps. The Royal Carmarthen Artillery joined the Welsh Division, becoming 3rd Brigade, Welsh Division, RA, with six batteries. (All the militia artillery continued to use their old titles unofficially.) On 1 July 1889 the territorial divisions were reorganised into three large divisions of garrison artillery, the Welsh militia units joining the Western Division and regaining their county titles (without any 'Royal' prefixes, though these were unofficially retained).

The Welsh militia artillery often carried out their annual training at the same time, so the batteries around the Haven could cooperate in live-firing exercises against target vessels, and with the searchlights and defensive mines operated by the Royal Engineers. In May 1894 the Carmarthen, Pembroke and Cardigan Artillery carried out combined night firing from Popton, Hubberstone and South Hook forts respectively, and the following year all three units trained together at Popton. The RA was divided into field and garrison branches in 1899, with all the militia and volunteer units becoming part of the Royal Garrison Artillery (RGA). The RGA's divisional structure was abolished in 1902, when the unit became the Carmarthen Royal Garrison Artillery (Militia).

On the outbreak of the Second Boer War in November 1899 the brigade's Militia Reservists were called up for active service with the RA. The regiment was embodied for garrison duty in May 1900, when it assembled at Carmarthen before entraining for Fort Popton, leaving No 5 Company to mount two 12-ton RML guns that had been supplied to Carmarthen for drill purposes. Many of the Carmarthens volunteered for service with the RA and a number saw active service in South Africa. The embodiment ended on 6 October 1900.

== Disbandment ==
After the Boer War, the future of the Militia was called into question. There were moves to reform the Auxiliary Forces (Militia, Yeomanry and Volunteers) to take their place in the six Army Corps proposed by St John Brodrick as Secretary of State for War. Some batteries of Militia Artillery were to be converted to field artillery. However, little of Brodrick's scheme was carried out.

Under the sweeping Haldane Reforms of 1908, the Militia was replaced by the Special Reserve, a semi-professional force whose role was to provide reinforcement drafts for Regular units serving overseas in wartime. Although the Carmarthen RGA (M) accepted transfer to the Special Reserve Royal Field Artillery on 31 May 1908 as the Carmarthen Royal Field Reserve Artillery, it was disbanded on 21 October 1909.

== Commanders ==
The following officers commanded the unit:

- Sir Rice Williams, 1684
- Col Rowland Groyn 1697
- Col George Rice assumed command 1759, died 1779
- Col Thomas Johnes ,1780, promoted to Brevet Colonel in the Army 18 March 1794
- Col John Campbell, 1st Baron Cawdor appointed 25 June 1798, died 1 June 1821
- Lt-Col Commandant Hon George Rice-Trevor, MP, (later 4th Baron Dynevor) 28 January 1831
- Lt-Col Sir James Williams-Drummond, 3rd Baronet, formerly Grenadier Guards, appointed 12 August 1861
- Lt-Col William Price Lewes, formerly 96th Foot, promoted 22 May 1866
- Lt-Col Arthur Price Jones, formerly 6th Dragoons, promoted 22 October 1881
- Lt-Col Viscount Emlyn (later 3rd Earl Cawdor), promoted 24 September 1892, retired 5 November 1902
- Lt-Col Sir James Williams-Drummond, 4th Baronet, formerly Grenadier Guards, promoted 20 December 1902 until disbandment

=== Honorary Colonels ===
The following served as Honorary Colonel of the unit:

- Col Lord Dynevor, former CO, appointed 12 August 1861, died 7 October 1869
- Col William Price Lewes, former CO, appointed 31 August 1881
- Lt-Gen Sir James Hills-Johnes, VC, GCB, appointed 25 February 1891

== Heritage and ceremonial ==
=== Colours ===
When the regiment was inspected in 1684 its Company colours each had the Cross of St George in the canton while the fields were divided gyronny between two colours. The cornet of the troop of horse was black. The Regimental Colour issued in 1759 bore the Coat of arms of the Lord Lieutenant (at that time their own colonel, George Rice) on a blue silk ground. The regiment ceased to carry colours when it was converted to a rifle corps in 1852; the artillery carry no colours.

=== Uniforms and insignia ===
From 1759 the regiment's uniform was always recorded as a red coat with blue facings even before it became a 'Royal' regiment. When it became a rifle corps in 1852 it adopted a Rifle green uniform with red facings, similar to that of the King's Royal Rifle Corps. On conversion to artillery in 1861 the regiment adopted the blue uniform with red facings of the RA.

Around 1800 the badge on the Shako plate was the Prince of Wales's feathers and coronet. About 1804–16 a scroll bearing the regimental title and the precedence number 39 were added to this badge: on the officers' shoulderbelt plate the numerals 3 and 9 were placed either side and the scroll beneath read 'ROYAL CARMARTHEN FUSILIERS'; on the other ranks' crossbelt plate the 39 appeared beneath the coronet and the scroll was misspelled 'ROYAL CAERMARTHEN FUSIL.'. About 1825 the officers' shako bore an eight-rayed star with the Prince of Wales's feathers, coronet and 'ICH DIEN' motto in the centre above a scroll inscribed 'ROYAL CARMARTHEN'. After conversion to rifles, the regiment adopted a shako plate badge of a bugle-horn enclosing the precedence number 24; officers also had the feathers, coronet and motto above. The other ranks' Forage cap badge was in two parts with a stringed bugle-horn above a 'ROYAL CARMARTHEN' scroll.

After conversion to artillery the regiment wore a standard RA helmet plate of the Royal Arms over a gun, the scroll beneath reading 'MILITIA ARTILLERY', changed to 'WELSH DIVISION' in 1882. An embroidered title reading 'WELSH' was worn on both shoulder straps 1882–89. After 1889 the scroll on the helmet plate read 'CARMARTHEN ARTILLERY'. From 1901 the letter 'M' (for Militia) appeared between the gun and the lower scroll. On khaki service dress (about 1907) the brass shoulder title read 'RGA' over 'CARN' and the cap badge was that of the RA with 'M' between the gun and the scroll.

=== Precedence ===
In 1759 it had been ordered that militia regiments on service were to take precedence from the date of their arrival in camp. In 1760 this was altered to a system of drawing lots where regiments did duty together. During the War of American Independence the counties were given an order of precedence determined by ballot each year, beginning in 1778. For the Carmarthen Militia the positions were:

- 5th on 1 June 1778
- 17th on 12 May 1779
- 15th on 6 May 1780
- 2nd on 28 April 1781
- 17th on 7 May 1782

The order balloted for on 3 March 1793 at the start of the French Revolutionary War remained in force throughout the war; Carmarthen was 17th. Another ballot for precedence took place in 1803 at the start of the Napoleonic War and remained in force until 1833: Carmarthen was 39th. In 1833 the King drew the lots for individual regiments and the resulting list continued in force with minor amendments until the end of the militia. The regiments raised before the peace of 1763 took the first 47 places and the Royal Carmarthen Fusiliers became 24th. Most regiments took little notice of the numeral, but the Royal Carmarthen Rifles obeyed an 1855 order to include it in their regimental badge.

The first artillery militia units formed were given an order of precedence based on alphabetical order: the Royal Pembroke was 24th, which happened to be the same as the Royal Carmarthen's precedence as an infantry regiment. The combined regiment used this precedence; after it split the Royal Carmarthen retained the precedence of 24th among artillery militia units but the Royal Pembroke dropped to 31st.

== See also ==
- Trained Bands
- Militia (English)
- Militia (Great Britain)
- Militia (United Kingdom)
- Welsh Division, Royal Artillery
- Western Division, Royal Artillery
- Royal Pembroke Artillery
