= List of Palmerston Forts around Milford Haven =

The Palmerston Forts around Milford Haven include:

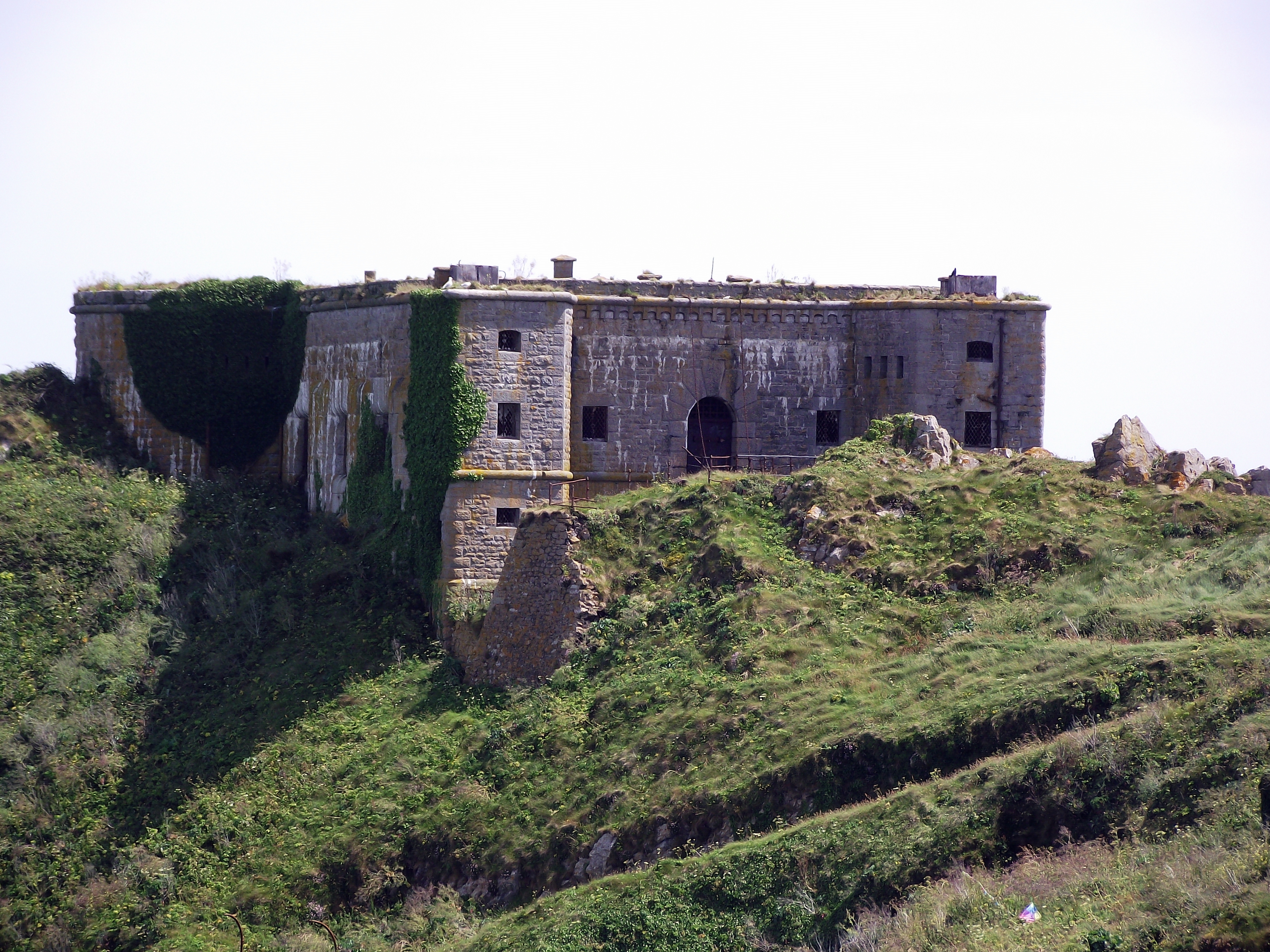
St Catherine's Fort, Tenby

- Fort Hubberstone
- Popton Fort
- Scoveston Fort
- South Hook Fort
- Stack Rock Fort
- Thorn Island Fort
- Llanion Battery
- St Catherine's Fort, Tenby
- Chapel Bay Fort
- West Blockhouse Fort
- Dale Fort
