= Pembroke Royal Garrison Artillery =

Pembroke Royal Garrison Artillery 532nd (Pembroke) Coast Regiment, RA 620th (Pembroke) Infantry Regiment, RA 425th (Pembrokeshire) Coast Regiment, RA
- Cap Badge of the Royal Regiment of Artillery
- Active: 1910–1961
- Country: United Kingdom
- Branch: Territorial Force
- Role: Coast Artillery
- Part of: Royal Garrison Artillery
- Garrison/HQ: Milford Haven/Pembroke Dock

The Pembroke Royal Garrison Artillery was a part-time unit of the British Army that defended the coast of West Wales during both world wars. Although it never saw action in its coastal defence role, it manned a number of siege batteries of heavy howitzers for service on the Western Front and Italian Front in World War I.

== Volunteer precursors ==
The enthusiasm for the Volunteer movement following an invasion scare in 1859 saw the creation of many Rifle and Artillery Volunteer Corps (RVCs and AVCs) composed of part-time soldiers eager to supplement the Regular British Army in time of need. Two AVCs were formed in Pembrokeshire in West Wales:

- 1st (Tenby) Pembrokeshire AVC, formed 6 January 1860, attached to 1st Administrative Battalion, Pembrokeshire RVCs, from September 1862; disbanded December 1870
- 2nd (Pembroke Dock) Pembrokeshire AVC formed 6 May 1864 from 2nd (Pembroke Dock) Pembrokeshire RVC with 2 Btys, attached to 1st Pembrokeshire RVC; redesignated 1st Pembrokeshire AVC ca July 1880; attached to the Pembroke Artillery Militia from 1881

The 1st Pembrokeshire formed part of the Welsh Division, Royal Artillery, from 1882, but was disbanded by November 1885, and there were no other Volunteer artillery units in Pembrokeshire until 1910.

== Territorial Force ==
In 1910, the Glamorgan and Pembroke Royal Garrison Artillery, which had been reorganised in the new Territorial Force (TF) two years earlier, was broken up into separate Glamorganshire and Pembrokeshire units. The resulting Pembroke Royal Garrison Artillery had the following organisation:

- Headquarters at the Drill Hall, Charles Street, Milford Haven
- No 1 Company at Milford Haven
- No 2 Company at Wogan Terrace, Saundersfoot, with a drill station at Tenby
- No 3 Company at Heol Emrys, Fishguard

It was designated as a Defended Ports unit in Western Coast Defences, which was based at Pembroke Dock and included the Regulars of Nos 44 and 57 Companies, Royal Garrison Artillery (RGA). Together, these units were responsible for manning the following guns defending the anchorage at Milford Haven:

- 4 × 9.2-inch
- 6 × 6-inch
- 8 × 12-pounder Quick-Firer

== World War I ==
=== Mobilisation ===
The Pembroke RGA mobilised in August 1914 in Western Coast Defences under the command of Major T.W. Price of No 1 Company. On the outbreak of war, TF units were invited to volunteer for Overseas Service and on 15 August 1914, the War Office (WO) issued instructions to separate those men who had signed up for Home Service only, and form these into reserve units. On 31 August, the formation of a reserve or 2nd Line unit was authorised for each 1st Line unit where 60 per cent or more of the men had volunteered for Overseas Service. The titles of these 2nd Line units would be the same as the original, but distinguished by a '2/' prefix. In this way duplicate brigades, companies and batteries were created, mirroring those TF formations being sent overseas.

By October 1914, the campaign on the Western Front was bogging down into Trench warfare and there was an urgent need for batteries of Siege artillery to be sent to France. The WO decided that the TF coastal gunners were well enough trained to take over many of the duties in the coastal defences, releasing Regular RGA gunners for service in the field, and 1st line RGA companies that had volunteered for overseas service had been authorised to increase their strength by 50 per cent.

Although complete defended ports units never went overseas, they did supply trained gunners to RGA units serving overseas. They also provided cadres to form complete new units for front line service, thus the siege batteries formed in late 1915–early 1916 were a mixture of Regular and TF gunners from the RGA coast establishments with new recruits. Three of the siege batteries formed at Pembroke Dock in 1915–16 had cadres provided by the Pembroke RGA (68th, 114th and 171st), two others by the Glamorgan RGA (96th and 121st), while a number of others (88th, 113th, 137th, 146th, 160th, 188th, 203rd, 219th, 250th, 262nd, 292nd and 306th) may have included trained men from the Pembroke and/or Glamorgan RGAs among the regulars and recruits, although the War Office or Army Council Instructions did not specifically order this.

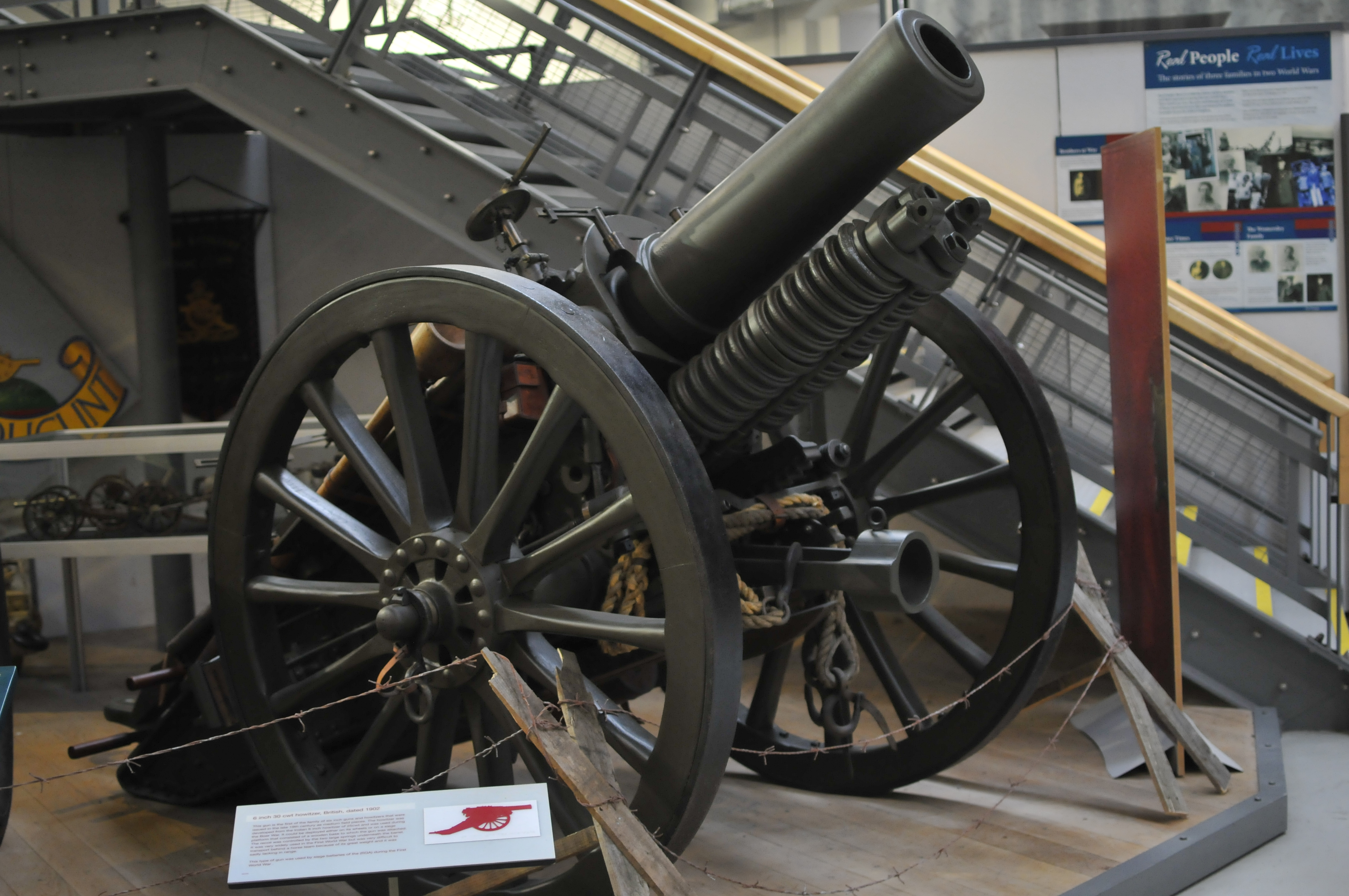
6-inch 30 cwt Howitzer preserved by the Royal Artillery Museum.

=== 68th Siege Battery, RGA ===
68th Siege Battery was formed under War Office Instruction 144 of 9 October 1915 from one company of the Pembroke RGA (TF) with equal numbers of men from the Regular RGA. The battery left the UK on 31 March 1916 and landed at Le Havre on 1 April to join the British Expeditionary Force (BEF). It took over four obsolescent 6-inch 30 cwt howitzers from 28th Siege Bty and joined VI Corps' Heavy Artillery.

==== Gommecourt ====
In June the battery moved to join VII Corps, which was preparing for the Attack on the Gommecourt Salient in the forthcoming 'Big Push' (the Battle of the Somme). Its main role was to bombard German trenches and strongpoints facing 56th (1/1st London) Division's attack frontage. However, the bombardment was unsatisfactory because of ammunition shortage and the bad weather that hindered observation.

On Z Day (1 July), the entire artillery supporting the 56th Division fired a 65-minute bombardment of the German front, then lifted onto their pre-arranged targets in the German support and reserve lines as the infantry got out of their forward trenches and advanced towards Gommecourt. However, the German guns laid a Barrage across No man's land preventing supplies and reinforcements from reaching the leading infantry waves who had entered the German trenches. Also, 68th Siege Bty was ordered to change targets to support the 46th (North Midland) Division's failing attack on the other side of the salient. By mid-afternoon the 56th Division's slight gains were being eroded and had to be abandoned after dark.

VII Corps' costly attack was only a diversion from the main BEF attack further south, and was not renewed after the first day. 68th Siege Bty was transferred to Fourth Army, which continued the offensive throughout the summer and autumn. On 13 September the battery was rearmed with four modern Vickers-built 6-inch 26 cwt howitzers.

==== 1917–18 ====
It was the policy to switch heavy batteries around as the situation demanded. In late 1916 and early 1917 68th Siege Bty made frequent switches, all in relatively quiet sectors. On 6 August 1917 the battery was joined by a section from the newly-arrived 402nd Siege Bty, and was made up to a strength of six howitzers. The battery then moved to Second Army, in time for the final days of the Battle of Passchendaele. Second Army HQ was sent to the Italian Front shortly afterwards, and the battery moved to join Third Army. Third Army was partially involved in defending against the German spring offensive in 1918, then the battery transferred to Fourth Army, which played a leading role on the Allied Hundred Days Offensive from 8 August. By early October Fourth Army had reached the River Selle. 68th Siege Bty was assigned to the massive fireplan for the Battle of the Selle on 17 October, when the 50th (Northumbrian) and 66th (2nd East Lancashire) Divisions made an assault crossing of the river, with German counter-attacks broken by the guns. The BEF then closed up for the final set-piece engagement, the Battle of the Sambre. 68th Siege Bty was with Fifth Army by the time of the Armistice with Germany. It was disbanded in 1919.

=== 114th Siege Battery, RGA ===
114th Siege Battery was formed at Pembroke Dock on 3 March 1916 under Army Council Instruction 535 of 8 March, which laid down that it was to follow the establishment for 'New Army' (Kitchener's Army) units, with a cadre of three officers and 78 men (the wartime establishment of an RGA Company of the TF) from the Pembroke RGA. It went out to the Western Front on 14 June 1916 equipped with four modern 6-inch 26 cwt Howitzers and joined 32nd HAG with Reserve Army (later Fifth Army).

The battery moved to 31st HAG with Third Army on 8 July and then to 28th HAG with First Army on 31 July. 28th HAG joined Fourth Army on 10 September for the Battle of Flers-Courcelette (15–22 September). By now massive quantities of artillery were employed for each phase of the continuing offensive as Fourth Army attacked again and again through the autumn. The battery was withdrawn from the line for rest, training etc. from 27 December to 20 January 1917.

==== Vimy ====
The battery moved to 44th (South African) HAG with First Army on 22 March 1917. The group supported the Canadian Corps at the Battle of Vimy Ridge on 9 April. The artillery plan for the heavy guns emphasised counter-battery (CB) fire. At Zero hour, while the field guns laid down a Creeping barrage to protect the advancing infantry, the heavy howitzers fired 450 yards (410 m) further ahead to hit the rear areas on the reverse slope of the ridge, especially known gun positions. The attack went in on 9 April with the Canadian Corps successfully capturing Vimy Ridge. Fighting in the southern sector (the Battle of Arras) continued into May.

After a number of transfers 114th Siege Bty joined 88th HAG with II Corps of Fifth Army in the Ypres Salient, during the Battle of Pilckem Ridge) that launched the Third Ypres Offensive. Just before the battle, on 28 July, a section from the newly-arrived 376th Siege Bty joined, bringing 114th Siege Bty up to a strength of six howitzers.

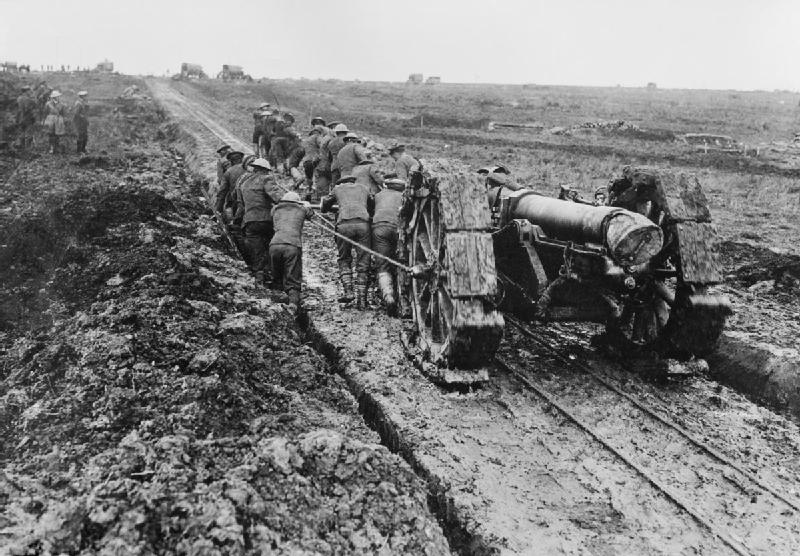
6-inch howitzer being moved through mud on the Western Front.

Gun batteries were packed into the Ypres Salient – II Corps had 36 RGA batteries in the Dickebusch area – where they were under observation and counter-battery (CB) fire from the Germans on the higher ground. Casualties among guns and gunners were high, and II Corps had failed to make much progress. The offensive continued through the summer and autumn of 1917: the Battles of the Menin Road, Polygon Wood and Broodseinde were highly successful because of the weight of artillery brought to bear on German positions. But as the offensive continued with the Poelcappelle and First and Second Battles of Passchendaele, the tables were turned: British batteries were clearly observable from the Passchendaele Ridge and were subjected to counter-battery (CB) fire, while their own guns sank into the mud and became difficult to aim and fire. There was no respite for the gunners: although 88th HAG moved out of the Salient in October, 114th Siege Bty stayed with Fifth Army, transferring to 68th HAG on 1 October. After 68th HAG was converted into a permanent RGA brigade on 1 February 1918, 114th Siege Bty remained with it until the Armistice.

==== Spring Offensive ====
Fifth Army was attacked on 21 March 1918, the first day of the German Spring Offensive. Artillery Observation Posts (OPs) were blinded by early morning mist and many were overrun along with the infantry in the forward zone. The German bombardment was savage. The batteries of 68th Bde were with XIX Corps, which was particularly hard hit, but 68th Bde was still intact at the end of the first day, unlike some heavy units in other parts of the front, either caught in the fighting or forced to abandon their guns as the Germans advanced rapidly. Next day the Germans continued their advance, and 68th Bde stood at Roise trying to stem the tide before pulling out after dark. On 23 March XIX Corps was forced back to the Somme, and over following days the RGA struggled to get their guns back during the 'Great Retreat'.

Fourth Army HQ took over all of Fifth Army's formations and units on 2 April. The last attack in the first phase of the German offensive came in on 4 April (the Battle of the Avre). The divisions holding the front were again pushed back, but they were backed by a mass of field and heavy artillery, including the batteries of 68th Bde, and the attack was stopped dead by the guns. Further attacks came on other parts of the front for several months, but none broke through completely.

==== Hundred Days ====
The Allied Hundred Days Offensive opened at 04.20 on 8 August at the Battle of Amiens. By now 68th Bde was supporting the Australian Corps on whose front the barrage fired by field and heavy artillery was so thick and accurate that scarcely a German shell fell after 05.40, and all the Australian objectives were secured.

The Allied advance continued through the autumn up to the River Selle (see above). Preparations to cross it began on 11 October, with 68th Bde allocated to the II US Corps, which was operating under Fourth Army's command and had no artillery of its own. The weather was misty, which hindered air and ground observation for counter-battery fire, but when the assault went in on the morning of 17 October the Selle itself was not much of an obstacle on II US Corps' front, and the objectives were taken.

For the final part of the Battle of the Selle on 23 October, II US Corps was relieved by the British IX Corps, which took over most of the Australian and RGA artillery. This massive corps artillery reserve supported the attack into the wooded slopeds beyond the Selle. Again, bad weather hindered air observation and CB work before the attack, but the barrage was deadly accurate. As the regimental historian relates, "The guns of Fourth Army demonstrated, on 23rd October, the crushing effect of well co-ordinated massed artillery. They simply swept away the opposition". After a pause to regroup and reconnoitre, IX Corps stormed across the Sambre–Oise Canal on 4 November (the Battle of the Sambre, see above). After that the campaign became a pursuit of a beaten enemy, in which the slow-moving siege guns could play no part. 114th Siege Battery was disbanded in 1919 after the Armistice.

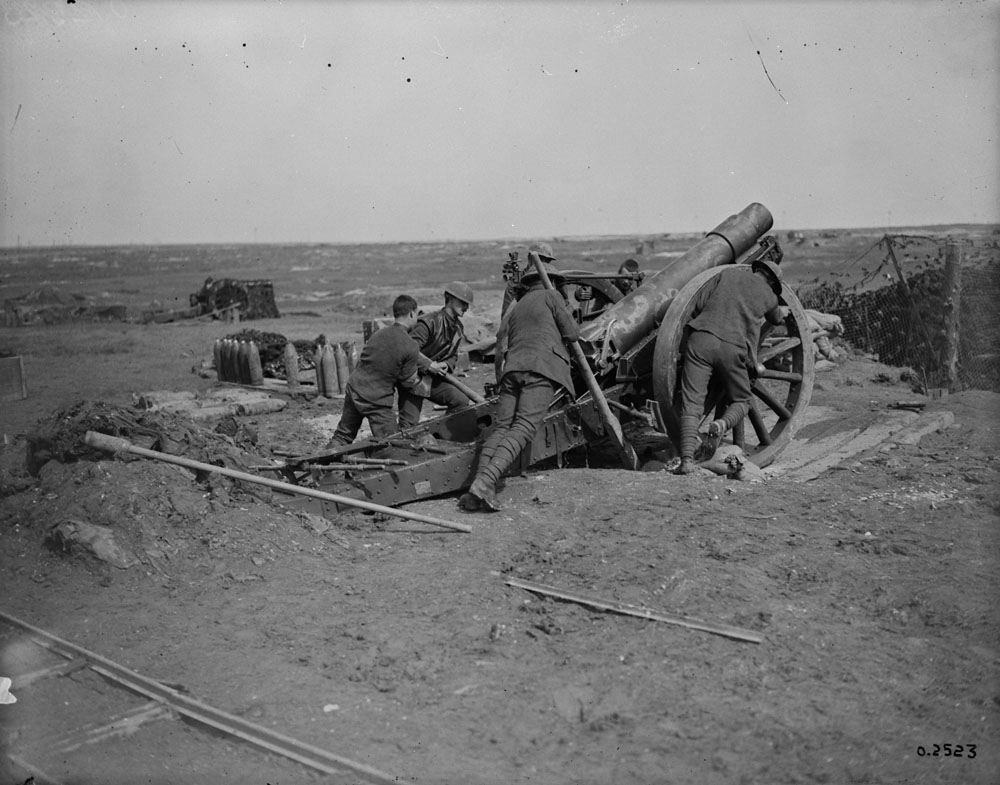
Crew positioning a 6-inch 26 cwt howitzer in 1918.

=== 171st Siege Battery, RGA ===
The 171st Siege Bty was formed at Pembroke Dock on 13 June 1916 under Army Council Instruction 1239 of 21 June with another cadre of three officers and 78 men from the Pembroke RGA. It went out to the Western Front on 16 September 1916 equipped with four 6-inch 26 cwt howitzers and joined Second Army, switching to Fifth Army shortly afterwards.

Fifth Army was engaged in the final weeks of the Battle of the Somme, then in a number of small actions in early 1917 as the German Army retired to the Hindenburg Line (Operation Alberich). During the Arras Offensive of April–May 1917 Fifth Army fought in attack and defence around Bullecourt and Lagnicourt.

171st Siege Bty was joined by a section from 368th Siege Bty on 29 June 1917, and brought up to the strength to man six 6-inch howitzers, but it seems that the additional guns never joined. The heavy guns of Fifth Army were engaged in a long artillery duel with the Germans throughout July in preparation for the Third Ypres Offensive, but the battery was transferred to Third Army after the first day of the battle. Third Army was not engaged in any major actions during this period.

In October the battery transferred back to Second Army, which had taken over direction of the faltering Third Ypres Offensive and fought a series of successful battles employing massive weight of artillery. But the offensive continued towards Passchendaeleit bogged down in the mud (see above).

==== Italy ====
Following the disastrous Battle of Caporetto on the Italian Front, Second Army HQ and several of its sub-formations were sent to reinforce the Italian Army; 171st Siege Bty was selected as part of these reinforcements, and went to support the First Italian Army. In April 1918 the British artillery was concentrated for a planned offensive, but finding level sites for the howitzers was difficult in the wooded mountainous terrain. The Allied offensive was postponed when it became clear that the Austrians were planning their own: the howitzers were ready when the Austrian assault began on 15 June (the Second Battle of the Piave River). The heavy howitzers systematically destroyed the Austrian guns on the Asiago Plateau and the offensive failed all along the front.

The heavy guns were then moved to join the British-commanded Tenth Italian Army for the final battle on the Italian Front, the stunning success of the Battle of Vittorio Veneto. The assault crossed the River Piave on 27 October, with the heavy guns engaging all known Austrian gun positions. A bridge was ready by 29 October and the heavy guns crossed the river. By 1 November the Austrian army had collapsed and the pursuing British troops had left their heavy guns far in the rear. Austrian signed the Armistice of Villa Giusti on 3 November, ending the war in Italy. 171st Siege Battery was disbanded in 1919.

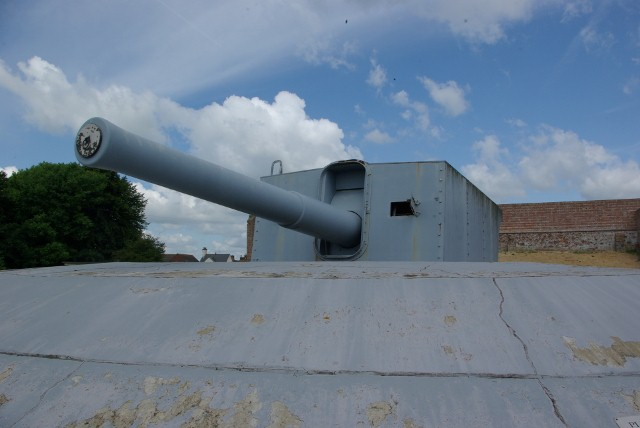
9.2-inch gun preserved at the Imperial War Museum Duxford.

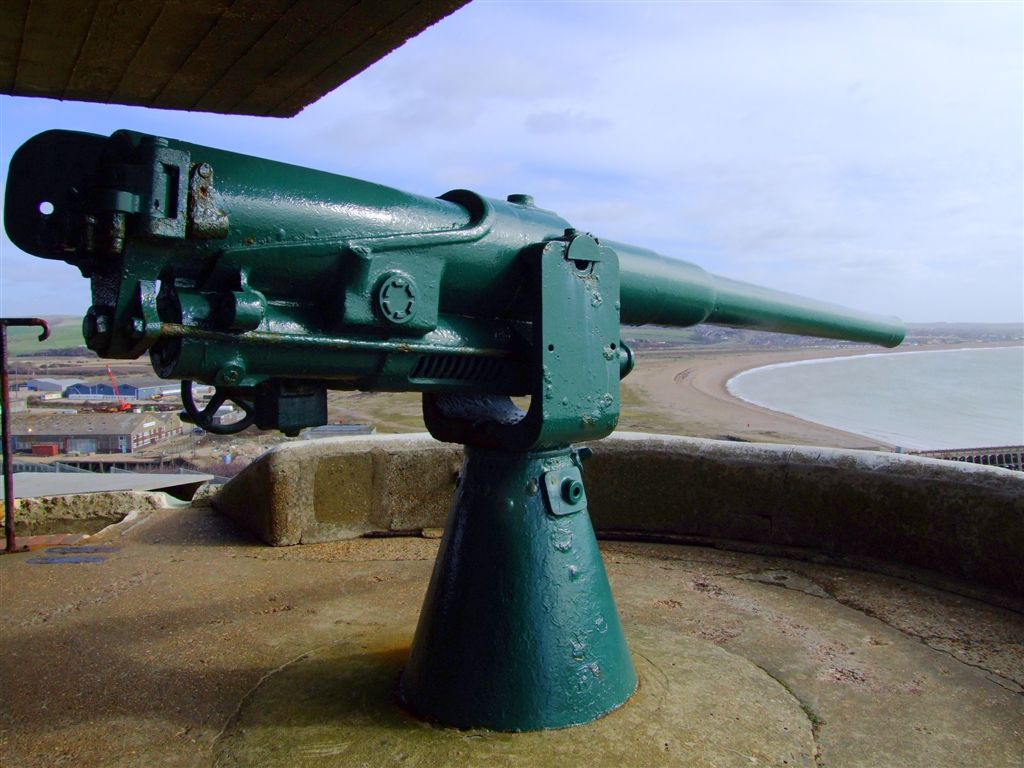
QF 12-pounder preserved at Newhaven Fort.

== Later war ==
Under Army Council Instruction 686 of April 1917, the coastal defence companies of the RGA (TF) were reorganised. The Pembroke RGA serving in the Milford Haven garrison was reduced from the three 2nd Line companies to just one, albeit with a slightly larger establishment of five officers and 100 men, and was to be kept up to strength with Regular recruits. Early in 1918, this No 1 Company, together with Nos 44 and 57 Companies, RGA, was absorbed into No 25 (Pembrokeshire) Coastal Fire Command, responsible for the defence of Milford Haven. No 25 FC was organised as A and B Btys but these were broken up during 1918. In April 1918 the Milford Haven Garrison comprised the following batteries:

- West Blockhouse Battery – 1 × 9.2-inch Mk X gun
- South Hook Battery – 2 × 6-inch Mk VII guns, 1 × 12-pdr QF
- Stack Rock Fort – 2 × 12-pdr QF
- Chapel Bay Battery – 2 × 6-inch Mk VII guns, 2 × 12-pdr QF
- East Blockhouse Battery – 1 × 9.2-inch Mk X gun

== Interwar ==
After the TF was demobilised in 1919 the Pembroke RGA was placed in suspended animation. It was reformed in 1920 with two batteries (one of them, later 184 Bty from No 1 Company at Milford Haven). When the TF was reconstituted as the Territorial Army (TA) in 1921, the unit was designated as the Pembrokeshire Coast Brigade, RGA, with the batteries numbered 184 and 185. In 1924 the RGA was subsumed into the RA, and the coast brigades were redesignated as heavy brigades, RA. The Pembroke Heavy Bde was in 53rd (Welsh) Divisional Area with the following organisation:

- HQ and 184 Heavy Battery at the Drill Hall, Miliford Haven
- 185 Heavy Battery at the Drill Hall, Pembroke, later at Saundersfoot

Finally on 1 November 1938 the RA redesignated its brigades as regiments, the unit becoming the Pembrokeshire Heavy Regiment, RA.

In 1926 it was decided that the coast defences of the UK would be manned by the TA alone. A 1927 report on coastal defences by the Committee of Imperial Defence had made recommendations for the defence of 15 'Class A' home ports, including Milford Haven (Scheme 8), but little was done to modernise them before the outbreak of World War II, and the Milford Haven scheme was still unfinished. On the outbreak of war the Pembroke Heavy Rgt was manning 2 × 9.2-inch and 4 × 6-inch guns there.

== World War II ==
=== Mobilisation ===
The regiment mobilised in Western Command on the outbreak of war in September 1939.

When the Battle of France turned against the Allies in May 1940, the Admiralty made a number of 6-inch guns available to the army for coastal defence, and when the whole of the UK was put on invasion alert after the Dunkirk evacuation a massive programme of coastal defences was initiated. Although this mainly involved the likely invasion areas of South and South-East England, an emergency battery of two BL 6-inch Mk XII naval guns was authorised on 12 June for Soldiers Rock Battery at Milford Haven. By November 1940 Milford Haven was protected by two 9.2-inch and six 6-inch guns.

The coastal artillery regiments had been reorganised in September 1940, with the Pembroke regiment becoming 532nd (Pembroke) Coast Regiment on 5 September, with a single 'A' Bty. 367 and 368 Batteries joined on 31 December 1940, taking over Soldiers' Rock and Fishguard respectively (367 was formally regimented 21 September 1941). A Battery (a 6-inch battery manning West Blockhouse) was redesignated 131 Bty on 1 April 1941; at the same time C/532 Bty was supposed to be redesignated 132 Bty, but since C/532 had not been formed the guns at East Blockhouse were instead manned by personnel from 73rd Coast Training Rgt, which had just been formed there

=== Mid-War ===
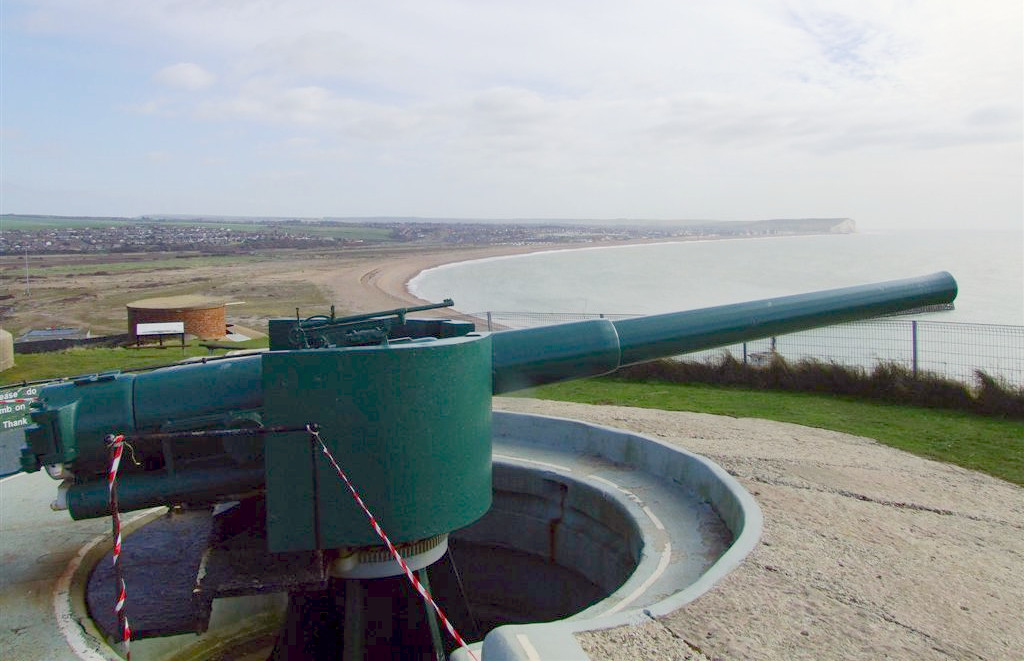
BL 6-inch Mk VII gun preserved at Newhaven Fort.

By June 1941 the regiment had been reorganised and expanded:

- 131 Bty – to 524th (Lancashire & Cheshire) Coast Rgt 2 May 1942
- 132 Bty – left early 1942
- 357 Bty – joined from 524 (L&C) Coast Rgt 2 May 1942 in exchange for 131 Bty and took over West Blockhouse
- 367 Bty
- 368 Bty
- 429 Bty – formed by 72nd Coast Training Rgt at Norton Camp, Yarmouth, Isle of Wight on 11 September from a cadre provided in Western Command; it joined on 11 December 1941, taking over East Blockhouse from 73rd Coast Training Rgt, which was disbanded between 1 and 11 January 1942 (429 Bty was formally regimented on 1 June 1942).
- 62 Coast Observer Detachment – joined later in 1941
- No 7 Coastal Artillery Plotting Room, Milford Haven – incorporated into regiment July 1942

=== Late War ===
Regimental HQ of 532nd Coast Rgt became part of Milford Haven Fire Control on 7 December 1942. By the end of 1942 the threat from German attack had diminished and there was demand for trained gunners for the fighting fronts. A process of reducing the manpower in the coast defences began in 1943, but there were few organisational changes for 532nd Coast Rgt:

- 32 Coast Observer Detachment – joined by December 1942 from 559th Coast Rgt at Mumbles
- 14 Coast Observer Detachment – joined January 1943 from 521st (Kent and Sussex) Coast Rgt at Newhaven, East Sussex
- 106 Coast Observer Detachment – joined by July 1943 from 570th Coast Rgt at Flat Holm, returned by November 1943

The manpower requirements for the forthcoming Allied invasion of Normandy (Operation Overlord) led to further reductions in coast defences in April 1944. By this stage of the war many of the coast battery positions were manned by Home Guard detachments or in the hands of care and maintenance parties. The regiment lost its ancillary units: 14, 32 and 62 Coast Observer Detachments were disbanded in April, 106 was renumbered 33 the following month and left to join 530th (Princess Beatrice's) Coast Rgt on the Isle of Wight in July, while No 7 Plotting Room at Milford Haven reverted to Western Command.

=== 620th (Pembroke) Infantry Regiment, RA ===
By the end of 1944, serious naval attacks on the United Kingdom could be discounted and the War Office began reorganising surplus coastal units into infantry battalions for duties in the rear areas. Meanwhile 21st Army Group fighting in North West Europe was suffering a severe manpower shortage, particularly among the infantry. In January 1945, the War Office accelerated the conversion of surplus artillery into infantry units, primarily for line of communication and occupation duties, thereby releasing trained infantry for frontline service. On 15 January 1945, RHQ 532nd Coast Rgt and HQ Milford Haven FC reorganised to the infantry role as 620th (Pembroke) Infantry Regiment, RA, with A to E Btys, though it does not appear to have served overseas.

The remaining details of RHQ 532nd Coast Rgt disbanded on 20 February 1945; 357 Bty became independent in Western Command with 367, 368 and 429 Btys under command. They disbanded on 1 November 1945.

620th (Pembroke) Infantry Regiment was formally placed in suspended animation on 19 December and completed the process on 17 January 1946.

== Postwar ==
When the TA was reconstituted in 1947, the Pembroke coast artillery was reformed as two regiments:

- 424 (Pembrokeshire) Coast Rgt at Milford Haven
- 425 (Pembrokeshire) Coast Rgt at Pembroke Dock

Both regiments formed part of 104 Coast Brigade. However, it was soon afterwards decided to reduce the number of TA coast regiments, and in 1948 424 Coast Rgt reorganised as 424 (Pembrokeshire) Heavy Anti-Aircraft Rgt. It was disbanded in 1950, with some personnel transferring to 302 (Pembroke Yeomanry) Field Rgt and some to 109 Transport Column, Royal Army Service Corps.

In 1953, 425 Coast Rgt amalgamated with 664 (Glamorgan) Coast Rgt to form 408 Coast Rgt, which changed its title to 408 (Glamorganshire and Pembroke) Coast Rgt the following year. The new unit was based at the Defensible Barracks, Pembroke Dock, with 425 Rgt providing P and Q Btys.

The Coast Artillery Branch of the RA was disbanded in 1956 and the regiment was broken up again: the Pembroke batteries were amalgamated with 302 (Pembroke Yeomanry) Field Rgt, while the Glamorgan Btys amalgamated with 281 (Glamorgan Yeomanry) Field Rgt

The Pembroke Yeomanry reverted to their 'cavalry' role in 1961 as a unit of the Royal Armoured Corps, ending the artillery lineage.

== Honorary Colonels ==
The following served as Honorary Colonel of the unit:

- Hugh Edwardes, 6th Baron Kensington, CMG, DSO, appointed 12 February 1909, died 4 March 1938
- J.L. Adams, TD, appointed 21 January 1939

== Notes ==
- Maj A.F. Becke,History of the Great War: Order of Battle of Divisions, Part 2b: The 2nd-Line Territorial Force Divisions (57th–69th), with the Home-Service Divisions (71st–73rd) and 74th and 75th Divisions, London: HM Stationery Office, 1937/Uckfield: Naval & Military Press, 2007, ISBN 1-847347-39-8.
- Maj A.F. Becke,History of the Great War: Order of Battle of Divisions, Part 4: The Army Council, GHQs, Armies, and Corps 1914–1918, London: HM Stationery Office, 1944/Uckfield: Naval & Military Press, 2007, ISBN 1-847347-43-6.
- Ian F.W. Beckett, Riflemen Form: A Study of the Rifle Volunteer Movement 1859–1908, Aldershot: Ogilby Trusts, 1982, ISBN 0 85936 271 X.
- Gregory Blaxland, Amiens: 1918, London: Frederick Muller, 1968/Star, 1981, ISBN 0-352-30833-8.
- Burke's Peerage, Baronetage and Knightage, 100th Edn, London, 1953.
- James Campbell, Shepard's War: E.H. Shepard, The Man who Drew Winnie-the-Pooh, London: LOM Art, 2015, ISBN 978-1-910552-10-0.
- Nigel Cave, Battleground Europe: Arras: Vimy Ridge, Barnsley: Leo Cooper, 1996, ISBN 0-85052-399-0.
- Basil Collier, History of the Second World War, United Kingdom Military Series: The Defence of the United Kingdom, London: HM Stationery Office, 1957.
- Brig-Gen Sir James E. Edmonds, History of the Great War: Military Operations, France and Belgium, 1916, Vol I, London: Macmillan,1932/Woking: Shearer, 1986, ISBN 0-946998-02-7.
- Brig-Gen Sir James E. Edmonds, History of the Great War: Military Operations, France and Belgium 1917, Vol II, Messines and Third Ypres (Passchendaele), London: HM Stationery Office, 1948//Uckfield: Imperial War Museum and Naval and Military Press, 2009, ISBN 978-1-845747-23-7.
- Brig-Gen Sir James E. Edmonds, History of the Great War: Military Operations, France and Belgium 1918, Vol IV, 8th August–26th September: The Franco-British Offensive, London: Macmillan, 1939/Uckfield: Imperial War Museum and Naval & Military, 2009, ISBN 978-1-845747-28-2.
- Brig-Gen Sir James E. Edmonds & Lt-Col R. Maxwell-Hyslop, History of the Great War: Military Operations, France and Belgium 1918, Vol V, 26th September–11th November, The Advance to Victory, London: HM Stationery Office, 1947/Imperial War Museum and Battery Press, 1993, ISBN 1-870423-06-2.
- Maj L.F. Ellis, History of the Second World War, United Kingdom Military Series: Victory in the West, Vol II: The Defeat of Germany, London: HM Stationery Office, 1968/Uckfield: Naval & Military, 2004, ISBN 1-845740-59-9.
- Cyril Falls, Caporetto 1917, London: Weidenfeld & Nicolson, 1966.
- Gen Sir Martin Farndale, History of the Royal Regiment of Artillery: Western Front 1914–18, Woolwich: Royal Artillery Institution, 1986, ISBN 1-870114-00-0.
- Gen Sir Martin Farndale, History of the Royal Regiment of Artillery: The Forgotten Fronts and the Home Base 1914–18, Woolwich: Royal Artillery Institution, 1988, ISBN 1-870114-05-1.
- Gen Sir Martin Farndale, History of the Royal Regiment of Artillery: The Years of Defeat: Europe and North Africa, 1939–1941, Woolwich: Royal Artillery Institution, 1988/London: Brasseys, 1996, ISBN 1-85753-080-2.
- J.B.M. Frederick, Lineage Book of British Land Forces 1660–1978, Vol II, Wakefield: Microform Academic, 1984, ISBN 1-85117-009-X.
- Lt-Col M.E.S. Lawes, Battery Records of the Royal Artillery, 1859–1877, Woolwich: Royal Artillery Institution, 1970.
- Norman E.H. Litchfield, The Territorial Artillery 1908–1988 (Their Lineage, Uniforms and Badges), Nottingham: Sherwood Press, 1992, ISBN 0-9508205-2-0.
- Norman Litchfield & Ray Westlake, The Volunteer Artillery 1859–1908 (Their Lineage, Uniforms and Badges), Nottingham: Sherwood Press, 1982, ISBN 0-9508205-0-4.
- Alan MacDonald, Pro Patria Mori: The 56th (1st London) Division at Gommecourt, 1st July 1916, 2nd Edn, West Wickham: Iona Books, 2008, ISBN 978-0-9558119-1-3.
- Alan MacDonald, A Lack of Offensive Spirit? The 46th (North Midland) Division at Gommecourt, 1st July 1916, West Wickham: Iona Books, 2008, ISBN 978-0-9558119-0-6.
- Col K. W. Maurice-Jones, The History of Coast Artillery in the British Army, London: Royal Artillery Institution, 1959/Uckfield: Naval & Military Press, 2005, ISBN 978-1-845740-31-3.
- Jerry Murland, Retreat and Rearguard Somme 1918: The Fifth Army Retreat, Barnsley: Pen & Sword, 2014, ISBN 978-1-78159-267-0.
- Purnell's History of the Second World War, London: Purnell, 1969–71.
- Mark Thompson, The White War: Life and Death on the Italian Front 1915–1919, London: Faber & Faber, 2008, ISBN 978-0-571-22333-6.
- Maj C.H. Dudley Ward, The Fifty Sixth Division, 1st London Territorial Division, 1914–1918, London: John Murray, 1921/Uckfield: Naval & Military Press, 2001, ISBN 978-1-843421-11-5.
- War Office, Instructions Issued by The War Office during October, 1914, London: HM Stationery Office, 1917.
- War Office, Instructions Issued by The War Office during October, 1915, London: HM Stationery Office.
- War Office, Army Council Instructions issued during March, 1916, London: HM Stationery Office.
- War Office, Army Council Instructions issued during June, 1916, London: HM Stationery Office.
- War Office, Army Council Instructions issued during October, 1917, London: HM Stationery Office.
- War Office, Titles and Designations of Formations and Units of the Territorial Army, London: War Office, 7 November 1927 (RA sections also summarised in Litchfield, Appendix IV).
- Ray Westlake, Tracing the Rifle Volunteers, Barnsley: Pen and Sword, 2010, ISBN 978-1-84884-211-3.
- Leon Wolff, In Flanders Fields: The 1917 Campaign, London: Longmans, 1959/Corgi, 1966.
- Mitchell A. Yockelson, Borrowed Soldiers: Americans under British Command, 1918, Norman, OK: University of Oklahoma Press, 2008, ISBN 978-0-8061-3919-7.

== External sources ==
- Mark Conrad, The British Army, 1914 (archive site)
- British Army units from 1945 on
- The Drill Hall Project
- Great War Centenary Drill Halls.
- Orders of Battle at Patriot Files Archived 26 March 2023 at the Wayback Machine
- Royal Artillery 1939–1945
- Graham Watson, The Territorial Army 1947
