= Scoveston Fort =

Grade II listed building in Llanstadwell, Pembrokeshire, Wales

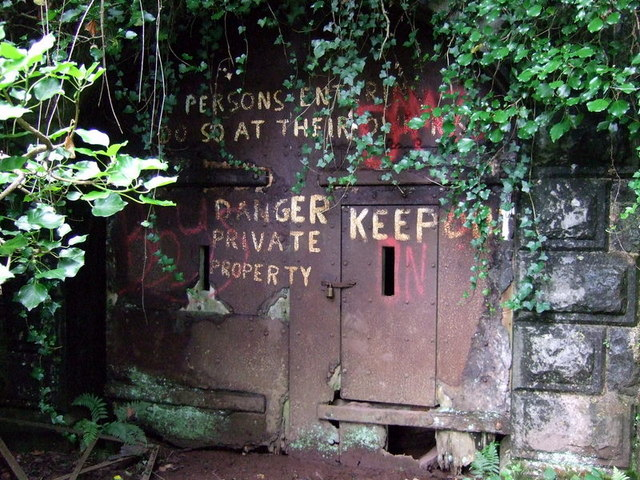
- The sealed entrance of Scoveston Fort
- Type: Fortification
- Location: Llanstadwell
- Nearest city: Milford Haven
- Coordinates: 51.7205°N 4.9776°W
- Built: 1861-1868

Listed Building – Grade II
- Designated: 10 November 2004
- Reference no.: 83214

Scoveston Fort, on the northern shore of Milford Haven, Pembrokeshire, Wales, U.K., is a Grade II listed building which is part of a series of forts built as the inner line of defence of the Haven following the Royal Commission on the Defence of the United Kingdom.

== Location ==
Built on a low hill to the north-east of the town of Milford Haven on Llanstadwell parish, it stands some 600 m north-west of Little Honeyborough and approximately 1 km north-east of Waterston. It commands views of the surrounding countryside.

== Description ==
The fort is shaped as a very large hexagon — similar to Crownhill Fort at Plymouth —, of which each side is 120 m long. It is surrounded by a dry moat about 8 m deep and 11 m wide). (36-foot-wide escarpment The escarp walls are stone-revetted, the counterscarp is natural rock.

There is only one entry, on the south side. The fort was approached by a serpentine road to a wooden bridge, the latter now replaced by an earth causeway. The entry is a stone archway into a tunnel through a massive earth bank. The moat was covered by one double and four single two-storey caponnieres, each with 4-gun embrasures and musketry loopholes.

The fort was meant to have 32 guns placed on the ramparts, served by 12 expense magazines set into the traverses, each gun position protected from behind by earth. There was also an earth bank across the centre of the parade ground. Accommodation for a garrison of 128 men was in the five caponnieres and 12 barrel-vaulted bomb-proof casemates, designed as a series of limestone vaults fronted in brick with windows and doors on the south front (similar to barracks at Fort Hubberstone). The magazine was under the north-west rampart. Two barrel-vaulted underground chambers were served by a lighting and ventilation passageway that surround it. A large traverse was erected across the length of the interior parade ground. Entrance to the fort is via a drawbridge and a tunnel through a small gorge.

Cost and the declining requirement for forts in the twentieth century meant that guns were never installed.

== History ==
=== Protecting the Haven: the premices ===
From Vikings in the 9th century to Normans at the end of the 11th century, Owain Glyndwr and his French mercenaries in 1405, and Henry Tudor in 1485, the Haven has been used recurrently over the centuries to set foot on the British island. Despite this, the area had to wait until 1539 for work to start on a pair of blockhouses, one on each side of the Haven entrance. Pembrokeshire writer George Owen proposed in 1595 the construction of a defensive triangle in the Haven, with forts on Thorne Island at Angle, Stack Rock in the centre of the waterway, and Dale Point; but this was costly, and was also abandoned. Pill Fort, a small armed camp outside Milford, was built by the Royalists during the first English Civil War (1642 to 1646) but was taken in 1643 by the Roundhead (Parliament supporter) Rowland Laugharne. After England declared war on France (Seven Years' War, 1756-1763), the area received some more attention: in an Admiralty paper of 19 September 1757, "Mr Pitt, Principal Secretary of State, has informed the Admiralty that the Master General of Ordnance says that Lieutenant Colonel Bastide reports that a floating battery made of an old gunship will help to secure Milford Haven.....". Bastide suggested the building of six forts. That plan was deemed too expensive and dismissed in favour of a revised proposal for just three forts. Work began on a fort at Paterchurch Point (beside Paterchurch Tower) in 1758 but was never completed, as the war with France was over before completion. Then, in 1814 Pembroke Dockyard was founded at Paterchurch and required protection, so the forts on the Haven banks were completed as part of the Palmerston fortifications.

=== Scoveston Fort ===
Scoveston fort was meant to defend the harbour of Milford Haven. There was an inner Haven ring — covering potential attacks from Milford Haven Waterway — with Popton Fort, South Hook Fort, Fort Hubberstone, Chapel Bay Fort, and the remodelled Stack Rock Fort. Another line of defence was supposed to cover attacks from the north with a line of inland forts extending from Newton Noyes (by the now decommissioned Royal Naval Armaments Depot of Milford Haven) to Burton Mountain (east of Neyland). Of that inland line, only Scoveston Fort was built. Construction started in 1861 and completed in 1864 or 1868, at a cost of £45,462.

It was never garrisoned, and was used mainly as a training camp for volunteers and militia.

World War I saw increased activity in the fort. In order to protect the dockyards of Milford Haven, Neyland and Pembroke Dock, a complex system of trenches was built in the land surrounding the fort to ward against land based attack. The trench system ran from Waterston to Llangwm.

During World War II, it was used as an air raid shelter by residents of Neyland. It was later used as a warehouse to store munitions in readiness for D-Day. During peace time it was left empty, under the care of a single caretaker.
It was revealed following his conviction that serial killer John Cooper had visited the fort and had deposited items which he had stolen from nearby properties, and implements he had used to restrain victims.
In August 2005, a local doctor committed suicide close to the fort.

== Protection ==
Scoveston Fort was listed as a Grade II Heritage building on November 10, 2004.

The fort is currently in an overgrown state, and not accessible to the public.

== Connex articles ==
- Chapel Bay Fort
- Fort Hubberstone
- Popton Fort
- South Hook Fort
- Stack Rock Fort
