= 171st Siege Battery, Royal Garrison Artillery =

- Cap Badge of the Royal Regiment of Artillery
- Active: 13 June 1916–March 1919
- Country: United Kingdom
- Branch: British Army
- Role: Siege Artillery
- Part of: Royal Garrison Artillery
- Engagements: Battle of Arras; Battle of Passchendaele; Second Battle of the Piave River; Battle of Vittorio Veneto

171st Siege Battery was a unit of Britain's Royal Garrison Artillery (RGA) formed during World War I. It served on both the Western Front, including the Battles of Arras and Passchendaele, and the Italian Front, where it participated in the repulse of the Austrian Summer Offensive of 1918 and the crushing victory at Vittorio Veneto.

== Mobilisation and training ==
171st Siege Battery was formed at Pembroke Dock in West Wales on 13 June 1916 under Army Council Instruction 1239 of 21 June, which laid down that it was to follow the establishment for 'New Army' (Kitchener's Army) units, with a cadre drawn from the Pembroke Royal Garrison Artillery, a Territorial Force (TF) unit forming part of the Pembroke Dock garrison. The cadre was to consist of three officers and 78 men (the wartime establishment of an RGA Company of the TF), the rest of the men would be Regulars and New Army recruits (Note: Nos 44 and 57 Companies, RGA, formed part of the Regular Army garrison at Pembroke Dock.)

== Western Front ==
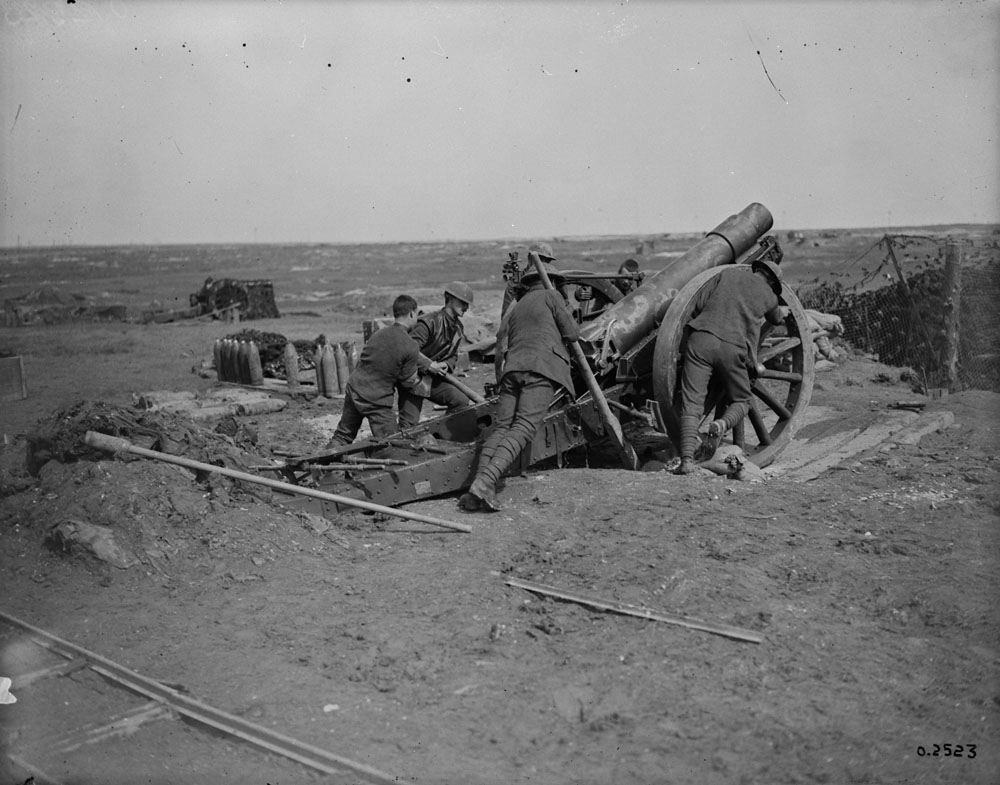
Crew positioning a 6-inch 26 cwt howitzer.

The battery went out to the Western Front on 16 September 1916 equipped with four 6-inch 26 cwt howitzers and joined 49th Heavy Artillery Group (HAG) in Second Army on 22 September, switching on 4 October to 43rd HAG, which joined Fifth Army shortly afterwards.

Fifth Army was engaged in the final weeks of the Battle of the Somme, then in a number of small actions in early 1917 as the German Army retired to the Hindenburg Line (Operation Alberich). During the Arras Offensive of April–May 1917 Fifth Army fought in attack and defence around Bullecourt and Lagnicourt. The last of this series of actions (the Second Battle of Bullecourt) was preceded by effective counter-battery (CB) fire from the heavy guns, but after the first day (3 May) the German guns driven out of their positions began to take a toll on the infantry from new positions that could not be located and neutralised quickly enough. A hurriedly arranged attack on 13 May had no real fireplan and failed, but Bullecourt was finally taken on 17 May.

171st Siege Bty was joined by a section from 368th Siege Bty on 29 June 1917, and brought up to the strength to man six 6-inch howitzers, but it seems that the additional guns never joined. (Note: 368th Siege Battery, RGA, was formed on 10 February 1917 at Prees Heath Army Camp; the other section reinforced 115th Siege Bty.) The battery joined 40th HAG on 7 July 1917. The heavy guns of Fifth Army were engaged in a long artillery duel with the Germans throughout July in preparation for the Third Ypres Offensive, but 40th HAG was transferred to Third Army on 1 August after the first day of the attack.

The battery was assigned to XVII Corps' Heavy Artillery on 4 August, then to 21st HAG on 11 August, to 27th HAG on 21 August and back to 21st HAG on 21 September, but Third Army was not engaged in any major actions during this period.

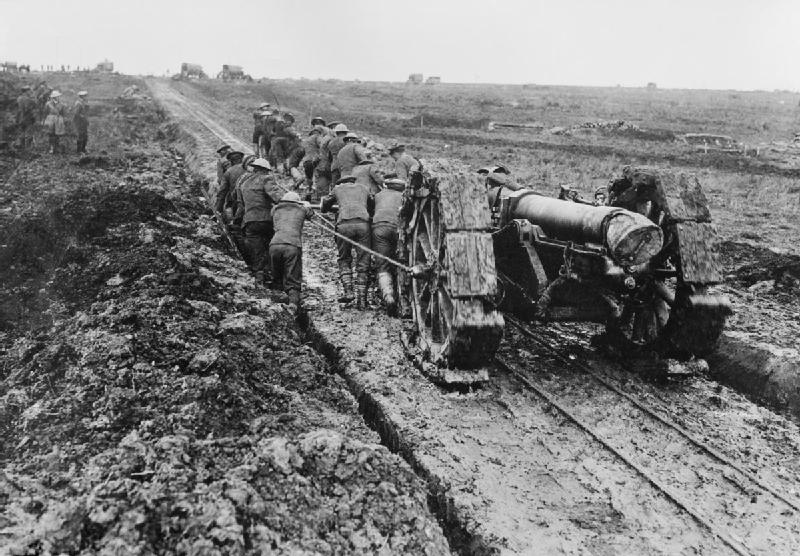
6-inch 26 cwt howitzer being moved through mud on the Western Front.

On 7 October the battery transferred to 70th HAG, then with Fifth Army, shortly afterwards changing to Second Army, both of which were then engaged in the Third Ypres Offensive. Second Army had taken over direction of the faltering offensive and fought a series of successful battles employing massive weight of artillery. But as the offensive continued with the Battle of Poelcappelle and First and Second Battles of Passchendaele, the tables were turned: British batteries were clearly observable from the Passchendaele Ridge and were subjected to counter-battery (CB) fire, while their own guns sank into the mud and became difficult to move and fire. To be able to supply them with ammunition the heavy guns had to stay strung out one behind the other along the few available roads, making them an easy target.

== Italian Front ==
Following the disastrous Battle of Caporetto on the Italian Front, Second Army HQ and several of its sub-formations were sent to reinforce the Italian Army; 171st Siege Bty was selected as part of these reinforcements. It left by rail with 15th HAG on 15 December and detrained in Italy three days later.

By 6 January 1918, 15th HAG had moved up to support the First Italian Army in the north, but was not involved in any important operations during the winter. 171st Siege Bty was transferred to the command of 94th HAG (under Italian command) on 12 January 1918, and back to 15th HAG on 30 March 1918. In February 1918 the HAGs became permanent RGA brigades: in addition to 171st, 15th Bde RGA now consisted of one heavy battery (155th) and one other 6-inch howitzer siege battery (197th).

A planned Allied offensive meant the repositioning of most of the British troops in Italy, and left 15th HAG spread out between the Brenta river and the Asiago Plateau where it had been since 6 January. However, it was then brought under the command of XIV British Corps in April and the rest of the British heavy artillery concentrated with it. Finding level sites for the howitzers was difficult in the wooded mountainous terrain, as was ammunition supply and command control. However, the planned Allied offensive was postponed when it became clear that the Austrians were planning their own offensive astride the Brenta. The howitzers were quietly moved into position on the nights of 11/12 and 14/15 June, and were ready when the Austrian bombardment began at dawn on 15 June (the Second Battle of the Piave River). Despite some initial Austrian gains, 48th (South Midland) Division held its main positions. 15th Heavy Artillery Group was assigned to CB fire and the heavy howitzers systematically destroyed the Austrian guns on the Asiago, notwithstanding poor visibility early on (Royal Air Force observation aircraft were able to direct the fire later). The Austrian offensive failed all along the front.

Preparations then began for the final battle on the Italian Front, the stunning success of the Battle of Vittorio Veneto. The British troops in the Asiago sector were relieved and moved to join the British-commanded Tenth Italian Army near Treviso. The heavy guns were moved silently into position and did not open fire during the preliminary attacks on 23 October. The main British assault crossed the River Piave on 27 October, with the heavy guns engaging all known Austrian gun positions and providing a protective barrage on either flank. A bridge was ready by 29 October and the heavy guns crossed the river. By 1 November the Austrian army had collapsed and the pursuing British troops had left their heavy guns far in the rear. Austrian signed the Armistice of Villa Giusti on 3 November, ending the war in Italy. 171st Siege Battery was disbanded in 1919.
