= South Hook Fort =

19th-century fort in Wales

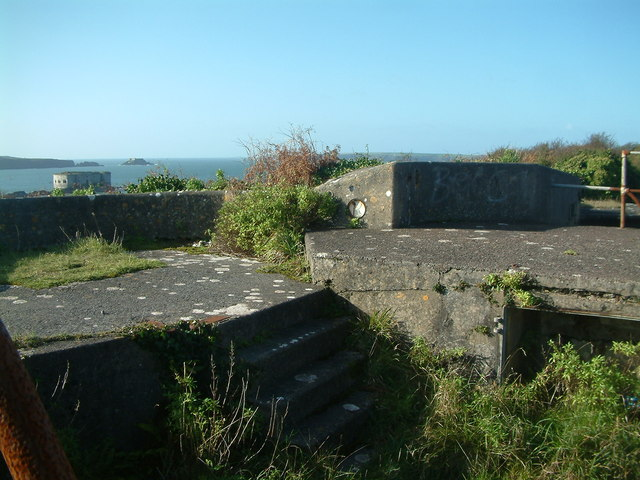
- Internal view of South Hook Fort
- Interactive map of South Hook Fort
- 51.7083°N 5.0836°W
- Location: Herbrandston, S. Wales
- Nearest city: Milford Haven

History
- Built: 1859-186(?)

Listed Building – Grade II
- Designated: 4 March 2004
- Reference no.: 82593

South Hook Fort, on the northern shore of Milford Haven, Pembrokeshire, is a Grade II* listed building which belongs to a series of forts built as part of the inner line of defence of the Haven following the Royal Commission on the Defence of the United Kingdom.

== Location ==
It stands in Herbrandston parish, at South Hook Point, some 200 m north of the cliffs.

== Description ==
It is D-shaped with four walls 4 feet thick and contains a horseshoe shaped two-storey barracks block. It comprises two separate batteries protected by earthworks and connected to the fort by covered walkways. The fort initially housed twenty guns facing out to sea, although this was later modified. It is surrounded by a deep ditch, and access is via a bridge. Work was completed in 1865. Its complement included a Defence Electric Light searchlight unit manned by 200 men, and its guns were aligned to provide crossfire with those at Hubberston and Popton across the Haven.

== History ==
The fort was part of the Palmerston fortifications meant to defend the harbour of Milford Haven.

Work commenced on the fort in 1859, a year before the Royal Commission was published. The fort later became part of the double defences of the Haven and was built to a similar design as that at Hubberstone.

The fort was fully manned during the First World War, although it was abandoned in the 1930s. It was sold in 1936 but requisitioned in 1939 by the Admiralty and called HMS Skirmisher. During the Second World War, it was manned by WRENS controlling naval movements in the Haven. After the war it was once again decommissioned, and returned to private ownership. It now part of the South Hook LNG terminal jetty.

It was listed as a grade II* Heritage site on March 4, 2004.

== Environment ==
The fort is a roosting and hibernation site for a colony of horseshoe bats, which are protected under UK law — along with their roosts.

== Connex articles ==
- Chapel Bay Fort
- Fort Hubberstone
- Popton Fort
- Scoveston Fort
- Stack Rock Fort
