= West Blockhouse Fort =

19th-century fort in Pembrokeshire, Wales

- Dale, Pembrokeshire in Wales
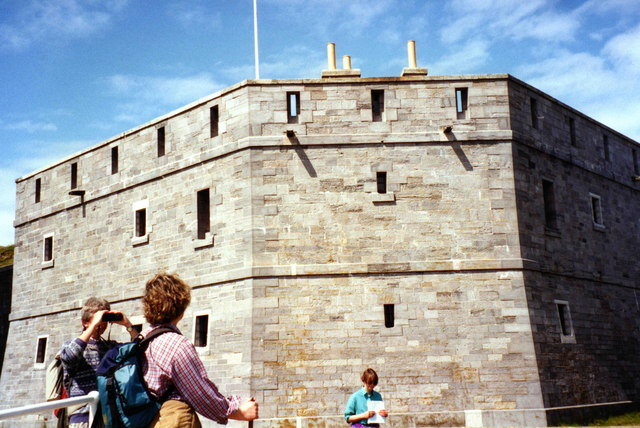
- A view of the barracks from the terreplein or gun platform at West Blockhouse Fort.

Site information
- Type: Coastal artillery fort
- Owner: Landmark Trust
- Open to the public: Yes

Location
- Coordinates: 51.6883°N 5.1580°W

Site history
- Built: 1857–1858

West Blockhouse Fort is a mid-19th century coastal artillery fort at West Blockhouse Point, a rocky headland near Dale, Pembrokeshire, to the west of Milford Haven in Wales.

== History ==
=== West Blockhouse ===
The site of the present fort was previously occupied by a disused blockhouse which had been built by order of King Henry VIII as part of a national fortification programme initiated in 1539. It was called West Blockhouse; a corresponding but uncompleted gun tower on the other side of the Milford Haven Waterway near Angle was called East Blockhouse. West Blockhouse was demolished in preparation for the construction of the present fort and there are no visible remains.

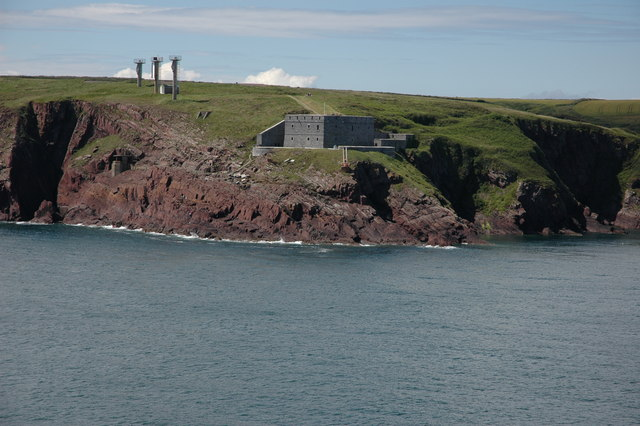
A view of West Blockhouse Fort from the Milford Haven Waterway.

=== West Blockhouse Fort ===
The present fort was planned in the early 1850s in response to a perceived threat from the Emperor Napoleon III of France, who had come to power following a coup d'etat in December 1851. It was intended to protect the anchorage at the mouth of the Milford Haven Waterway by means of interlocking fire with nearby Thorn Island Fort and Dale Fort which were constructed at the around the same time. A date of 1857 is inscribed over the main entrance, and it had been completed by 1858. Although there were various proposals to either rearm the fort's increasingly obsolete six 68-pounder muzzle-loading guns or to abandon it altogether, it was not until 1893 that it was reduced to the status of a "practice battery" and was finally disarmed in 1900. However, in 1901, the terreplein or gun platform was rebuilt to take four 5-inch gun breech-loading guns and a further two 3 pounder quick-firing guns were installed on the roof of the barrack block. By 1907, the nearby West Blockhouse Battery having been completed, all of the guns at the fort had been removed, but it continued in use for storage and accommodation. During the Second World War, the fort became the headquarters of the Haven's searchlight defences and two searchlight positions were built close by.

The military presence at the fort ended in 1956 and the fort was allowed to become derelict. The buildings were purchased by the Landmark Trust in 1969 and the land in the following year. Restoration began in late 1986 and included the internal reconstruction of the barracks as holiday apartments and rebuilding the original brick vaulted roof that had been replaced with concrete to support the quick-firing guns. The architect for the conversion was Andrew Thomas of Thomas Jones Associates, Builth Wells. The fort became a Grade II* Listed building in 1996, because it is "Probably the best preserved of all the 'Palmerston Forts' around Milford Haven".

=== West Blockhouse Battery ===
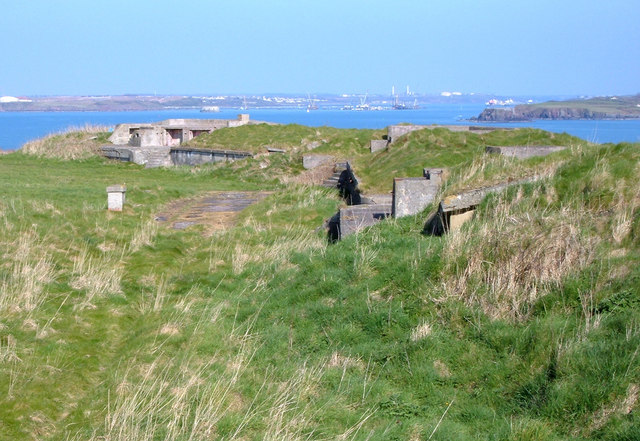
Concrete gun emplacements at West Blockhouse Battery.

In 1900, work started on a battery for modern breech loading coast artillery on a site 150 yards (138 metres) to the west of the fort and higher up the cliff. At the same time, a similar battery was constructed across the haven at East Blockhouse near Angle. The battery was completed with an armament of two BL 9.2-inch Mk X guns and three BL 6-inch Mk VII guns. Over the following decades, various guns were withdrawn and then reinstated, but in 1939, the 9.2-inch guns were removed, leaving two 6-inch guns which seem to have been manned until the abolition of coastal artillery in 1956. The site is now derelict and although the concrete gun emplacements remain, other features of the battery have been demolished, buried or have become overgrown.

== See also ==
- Palmerston Forts, Milford Haven
- West Blockhouse Point Beacons
