= Thorne Island =

Fortified islet in southern Wales

Coordinates: 51.691822°N 5.118136°W

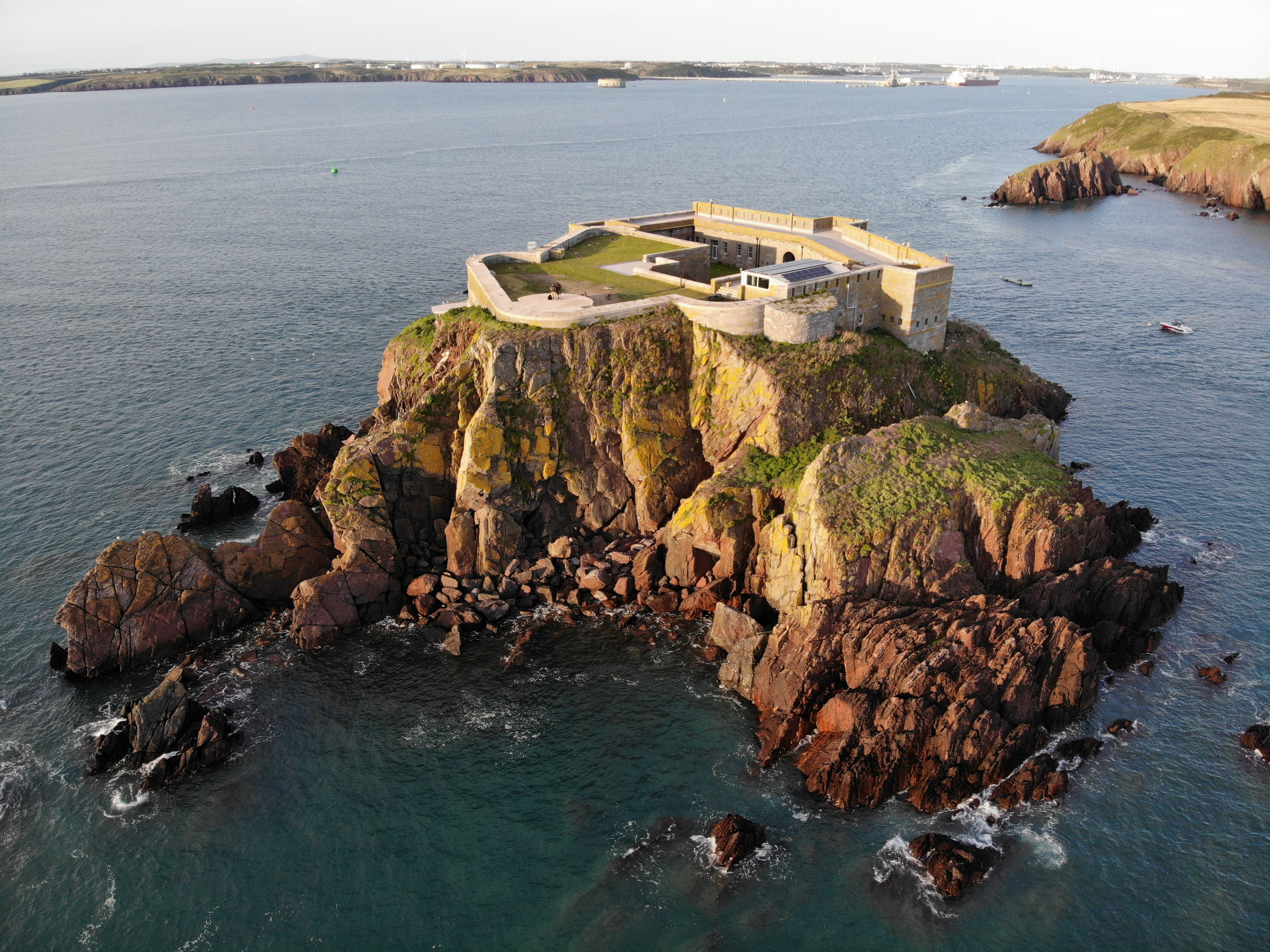

- Location within Pembrokeshire
- Community: Angle
- Principal area: Pembrokeshire
- Country: Wales
- Sovereign state: United Kingdom
- Police: Dyfed-Powys
- Fire: Mid and West Wales
- Ambulance: Welsh

Thorne Island is a rocky islet and part of the community of Angle, Pembrokeshire, Wales, with an area of 2 acres (8,100 m^{2}), dominated by a coastal artillery fort built to defend the Milford Haven Waterway in the mid-19th century. It has been the site of a number of shipwrecks, including one in 1894 that was carrying a cargo of Scotch whisky.

== History ==
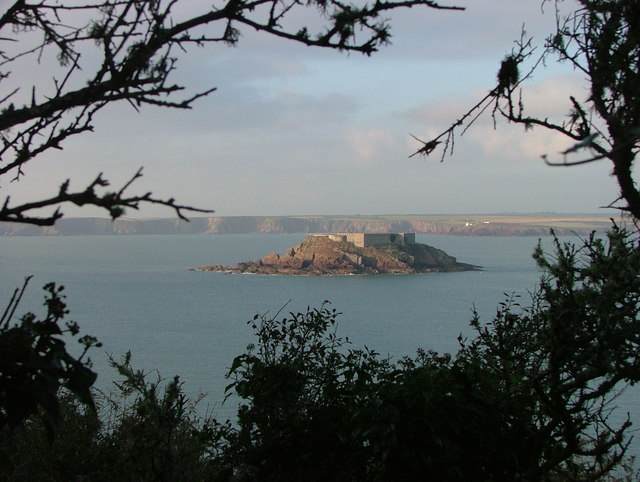
Thorne Island viewed from footpath in Angle

=== Fortification ===
Thorne Island commands the entrance to the anchorage of Milford Haven and access to the former Royal Dockyard at Pembroke Dock. A proposal was made to fortify the island in 1817, but it was not implemented. In the 1850s, there was growing concern about the increasing strength of the French Navy since the French invaded Fishguard in north Pembrokeshire and controlled it for 3 days.and the expansionist policy of the Emperor Napoleon III. Work started on the existing fort at some time after 1852 and '1854' is carved above the entrance.

The fort is an irregular polygon in plan and was designed with a seaward facing battery for five RBL 7-inch Armstrong guns and four 68-pounder guns, all mounted en barbette (i.e. in an open mounting, firing over a parapet). The landward side of the fort consists of a defensible barracks, with a loopholed parapet overlooking the entrance.

In 1860, the report of the Royal Commission on the Defence of the United Kingdom commented that "Although these batteries [ie: Thorne Island Fort, Dale Fort and West Blockhouse Fort] would prevent an enemy from making use of the anchorage at the mouth of Milford Haven, they would not prevent the passage of steamers of war, and therefore would not suffice to protect the dockyard or the haven itself." This was due to the limited number and size of guns that the existing fort could bring to bear on any fast moving target. The report recommended to Lord Palmerston that further forts should be strengthened or constructed to counter the potential threat of the French Navy. Eventually twelve forts were constructed around the entrance to Pembroke Dock and Milford Haven including Fort Hubberstone, Popton Fort and Stack Rock Fort.

=== Since 1947 ===
The fort was converted into a hotel in 1947, and could be rented for weddings, stag parties, and other special events. It became a Grade II* Listed building in 1996, because it was "a well-preserved fort of Palmerston's Haven defences". Sold for £275,000 in 1999, in 2001 the island was owned by the Von Essen hotel group, who intended spending £4 million to reopen the hotel with a five star rating and a cable car to provide access from the mainland. A competition was successfully held to find a family who would serve as caretakers for a year.

No works took place, and the island was resold in November 2011 for 'significantly less' than the guide price of £750,000 to the owner of Chislehurst Caves, who put it back on the market in 2016 for £550,000. It was purchased by Mike Conner, a software entrepreneur, in May 2017. After five years restoring the building to a habitable state, including running water, he put the property back on the market in August 2025 at a price of £3 million, with the hotel restored to have 40 bedrooms, four en-suite bathrooms and its own night club.

== Wrecks ==
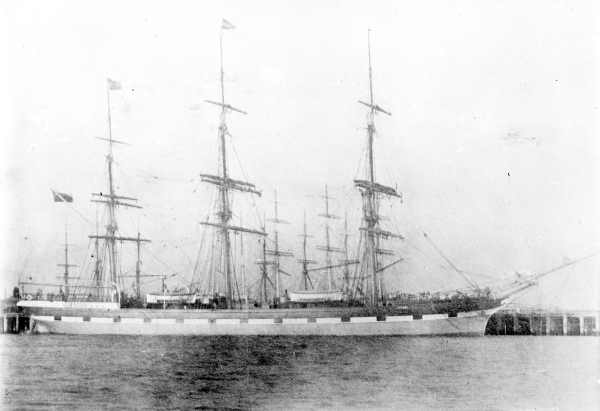
The Loch Shiel

Thorne Island and the rocks around it were a hazard to shipping. Divers recognise over twelve wrecks that are worth diving in the area of the island, but of special interest is the 1878 built sailing ship Loch Shiel that sank in 1894. 33 passengers and crew were rescued from the ship which had run into rocks off the island. Two Angle lifeboat crew members and the honorary secretary received RNLI silver medals.

The rescue is particularly noteworthy as it is described as Wales' "Whisky Galore". The Loch Shiel was carrying goods from Scotland to Adelaide and included gunpowder, beer and 60 (some say 7,000) cases of Glasgow whisky. The cargo was partially recovered by Customs, but some of the bottles are still amongst the wreck and are described as "undrinkable". Shortly after the sinking, two local men from the same family drowned whilst attempting to bring a keg ashore, and another died from alcohol poisoning. Divers still investigate the wrecks off the island and have auctioned full beer bottles that came from the Loch Shiel. The beer is reported to be untainted by salt water, flat, but drinkable. Bottles have sold for £1,000 at auction.
