= Chapel Bay Fort =

Fort in Pembrokeshire, Wales

Coordinates: 51.690077°N 5.098407°W

- Angle, Pembrokeshire, Wales
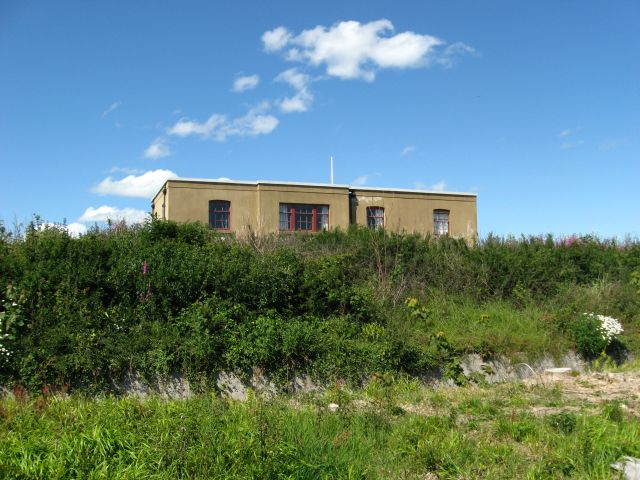
- Chapel Bay Fort

Site information
- Open to the public: Yes

Site history
- In use: Museum

Chapel Bay Fort is located on the southern shore of the Milford Haven Waterway, Pembrokeshire, Wales. The fort is approximately 1 mile (1.6 km) from the village of Angle. One of a series of forts built as part of the inner line of defence of the Haven following the Royal Commission on the Defence of the United Kingdom, it is a Grade II Listed Building. and is also known as "Chapel Bay Battery".

Construction began in 1890 and was completed in 1891 at a cost of £11,779. The battery was the first fortification in the area to be built of mass concrete. It could accommodate 91 men and had mess room and sick bay facilities. Its initial armament was three ten inch rifled muzzle-loading guns.

From June 1900 until August 1901, the battery was reconstructed to take more modern armament - three 6-inch breech-loading guns. Throughout the First World War, the fort remained in military hands, but it was decommissioned in 1920. It was sold to the Angle Estate in 1932. The battery was used during the Second World War when a mining observation post was built on the site. In recent years the fort was acquired privately and now functions as a museum, following a £500,000 grant from the Welsh Assembly. One of the fort's original 10-inch guns has been re-mounted as part of the restoration. The site opened to the public in April 2015.
