= Popton Fort =

Coordinates: 51.693°N 5.048°W

- Milford Haven; Wales
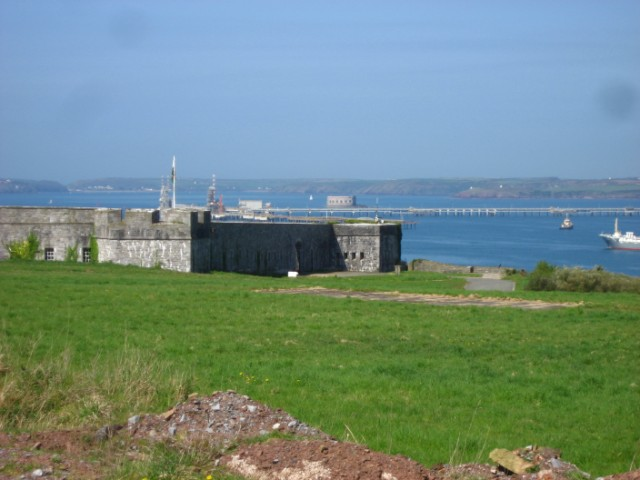
- View from Popton Fort, looking out towards Milford Haven with Stack Rock Fort in the centre distance

Site information
- Open to the public: No

Location
- Location within Wales

Site history
- Built: 1859-64
- In use: Company headquarters
- Materials: Stone

Popton Fort, a Grade II* Listed Building, is a Palmerston fort completed in 1864 as part of the inner line of defence of Milford Haven together with Fort Hubberstone on the opposite bank.

Work commenced in 1859, only completed in 1864 at a cost of £76,000. It has tapering hexagonal ramparts with pentagonal bastions at the angles. It is surrounded by a large clear area of sloping ground to the front, and a ditch on the south side. It contained eleven 9-inch 12 ton rifled muzzle loaded guns in casemates, and ten guns in open emplacements. The barracks located at the rear could house ten officers, five staff sergeants and 158 other ranks. Facilities included a canteen, wash rooms and a hospital. It comprises two batteries, Moncrieff Battery on the west side and Open Battery on the north. Abandoned at the start of the 20th century it was used again during the Second World War.

Bought in 1957 by BP to be used as an oil terminal it was renovated but was closed to the public. It is now part of Valero's Angle Bay Refinery.

The fort was Grade II* listed in 1996 and is currently a private property.
