= Fort Hubberstone =

Listed building in Milford Haven, Wales

Coordinates: 51°42′30″N 5°03′17″W

- Milford Haven; Wales
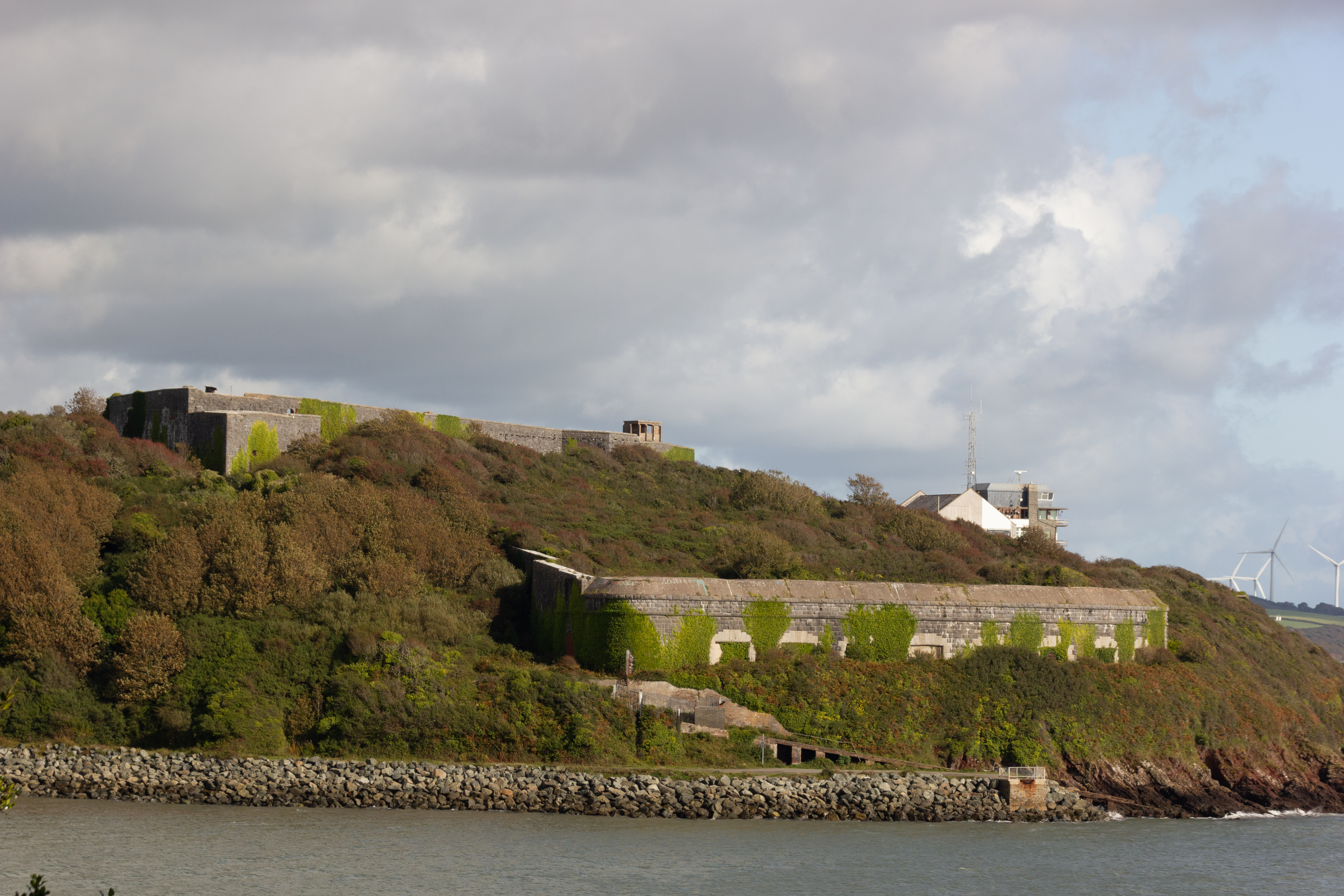
- View of Hubberstone Fort from Gelliswick beach

Site information
- Owner: Private
- Open to the public: No

Location
- Location within Wales

Site history
- Built: 1860-63
- In use: Derelict
- Materials: Stone

Fort Hubberstone, on the west side of Milford Haven, Pembrokeshire, is a Grade II* Listed Building which belongs to a series of forts built as part of the inner line of defence of the Haven following the Royal Commission on the Defence of the United Kingdom. Together with Popton Fort on the opposite shore, it provided an interlocking field of fire, and represented the last layer of defence before reaching the Royal Naval dockyard at Pembroke Dock. Construction began in 1860 and was completed in 1863 at a cost of £55,000. It is a large battery, with eleven guns in casemates, eight in an open battery above, with another nine in an open flank battery, and a large barracks to the rear. It is a D-shaped structure, with a bomb-proof roof which protected the barracks and other buildings from mortar projectiles. On its landward side, it was protected by a deep ditch, and on the seaward side by a counter-scarp gallery. The associated casemate battery is located further down the headland and separated from the fort.

The barracks had capacity for 250 men, provided by the militia of the Royal Pembroke Artillery with a detachment of regular infantry. Recruitment however was frequently constrained by the isolation of the fort, lacking the appeal of more urban stations. The fort was often required to fire live practice rounds, and in 1894 participated in experiments to illuminate targets with searchlights so they could be engaged at night. Notoriously, in 1875 Lieutenant Walter of the militia was murdered by a Doctor Alder in a drunken brawl.

The fort was abandoned after World War I as a consequence of the Haldane Reforms. A 1919 proposal to convert the structure into social housing came to nothing. World War II saw the fort once again in active use, when it was used as an air raid shelter and army camp for American military personnel.

On a good site, the fort has fallen into disrepair. Under the ownership of Milford Haven Port Authority, there were various unsuccessful plans to restore the structure. The site is not currently open to the public, and has been the scene of non-fatal injuries to trespassers. In 2011 it was named as the fifth most endangered archaeological site in the UK by British Archaeology, which prompted a campaign to seek a long-term sustainable use of the site. In 2019, plans were announced to convert the site into a military-based residential camp for former service men and women. These plans were subsequently dropped due to a media scandal involving Camp Valour.

In September 2020, the site was purchased by Guy Anderson, a private investor and local councillor, who announced it would be open it to the public as a ‘living ruin’.

In 2021 it featured on the BBC television programme Hidden Wales: Last Chance to Save..

In 2024 the site was sold to Alyson Rawes and Kelsey Trattner.
