= Stack Rock Fort =

19th century fort in Pembrokeshire, Wales

Coordinates: 51.7024°N 5.0921°W

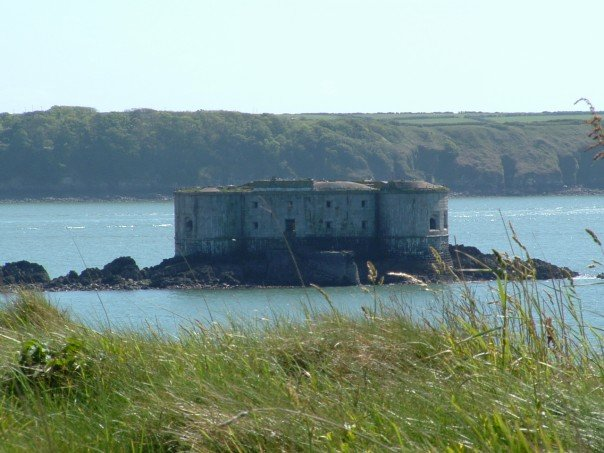
Stack Rock Fort, 2007

Stack Rock Fort is a fort built on a small island in the Milford Haven Waterway, Pembrokeshire, Wales. A 3-gun fort was built between 1850 and 1852, and then upgraded from 1859 to 1871 with a new building that completely encased the original gun tower. It is now a Grade II* listed building and a scheduled monument (registered SAM number PE334).

== History ==
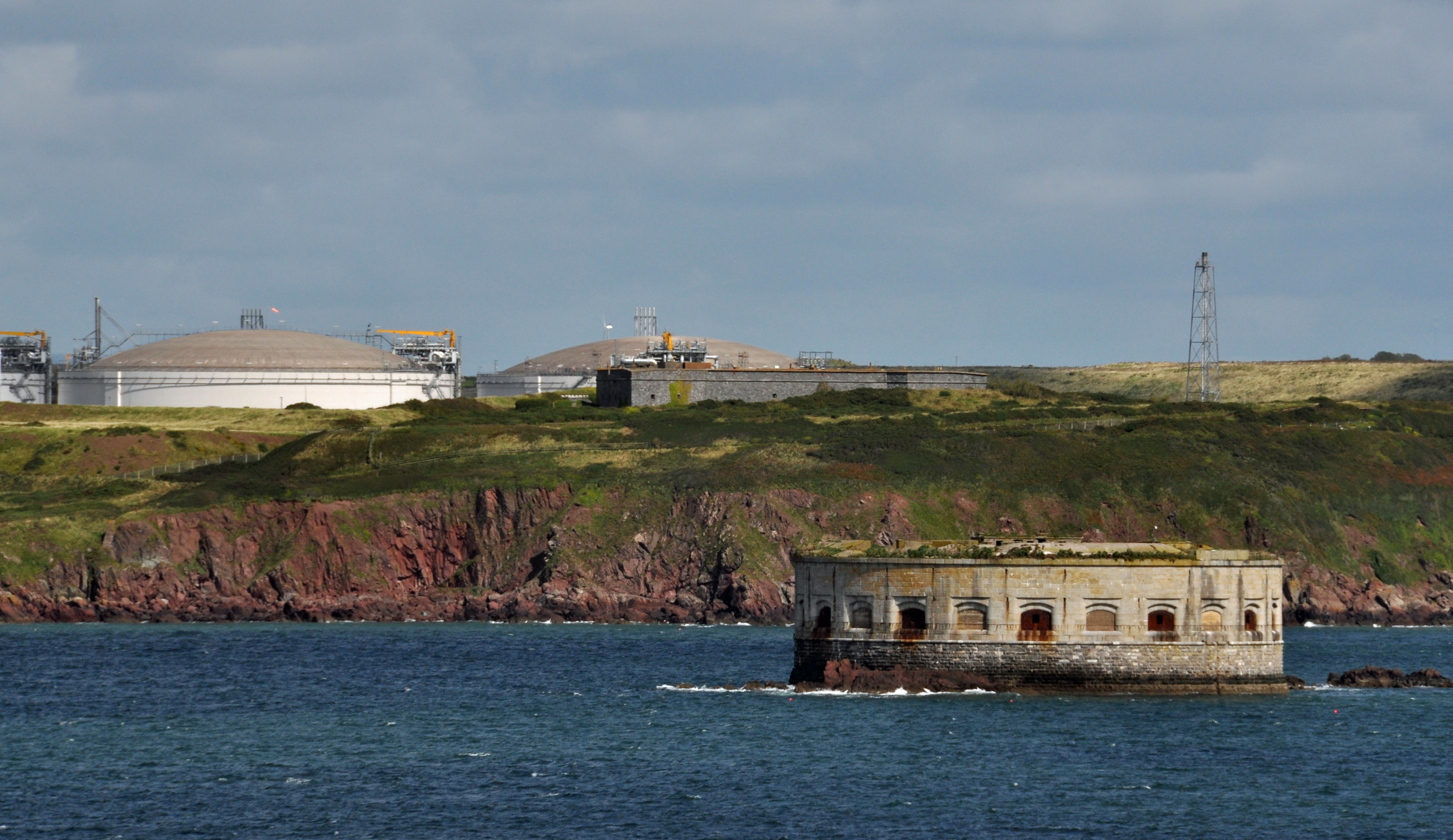
The fort in 2012

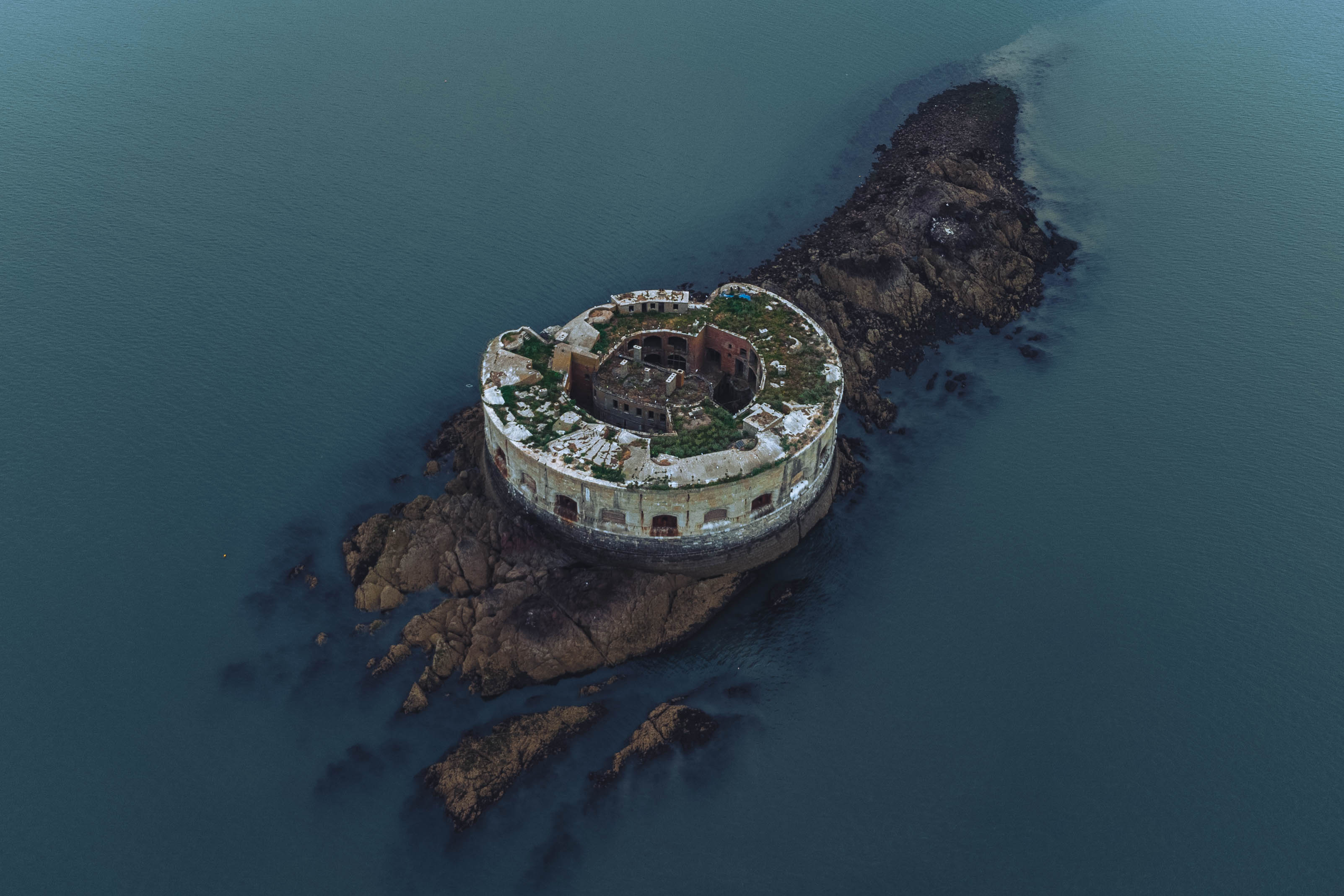
Stack Rock Fort viewed from above, 2021

In 1539, the first proposal for a fortification at Stack Rock to protect the estuary was submitted by Thomas Cromwell, however his proposal was not approved. Similar proposals were made in 1748 when Lewis Morris carried out a survey of Milford Haven, reporting on shipwrecks and navigation and recommending that a small fort be built here. Another survey followed in 1817.

For over 200 years, proposals and surveys were discussed regarding the need for a fortress on Stack Rock Island, yet nothing had been done. In 1850, with the rise of Napoleon III in France, and with the new French emperor's occasionally bellicose threats towards Britain, the time had finally come to put the plans to build a fort into action. The Royal Dockyard at Pembroke Dock was finally going to have its own fort to defend it from the sea. The initial result was a tower mounting three guns, similar to the two towers in Pembroke Dock. The initial tower was elliptical in section, with a maximum diameter of 55 feet (17 m) and a maximum height of 30 feet (9.1 m). Construction commenced in 1850, being completed in 1852.

In 1858, the first appearance of the new French ironclad Gloire with its new invulnerability to the initial fort's guns rendered the initial tower and its guns as obsolete, so it was decided to completely surround the initial tower with a newly expanded and updated battery. The original design of the newly expanded fort was for two decks each of 19 casemates and 16 open air guns above, 54 guns in total, and built mainly of limestone. However, after the foundations had been started in 1861, the design for the expansion was amended to have stronger granite piers supporting iron gun shields. The expansion's new basements and magazines were completed in 1863. Then the design was altered again, for 16 large guns on a single floor of casemates in the front and seven smaller guns on two floors in the gorge or the fortification's "weak-point," in the rear of the fort facing into the Haven. The top floor was built as accommodation intended for 4 officers and 152 men. On the roof of the fort, three gun turrets each with two huge RML 12-inch 25-ton gun were planned, but never installed. This scheme was finally completed in 1871. The usual peacetime garrison was one officer and thirty men. Eventually the concerns about Napoleon III's intentions proved to be unwarranted, and the fort never saw actual combat.

During WW I the fort was used to monitor and protect the harbor with its big guns. Other forms of protection which the fort provided for the harbor included a system of anti-ship mines in the harbor which were remotely controlled from the fort, as well as a set of large searchlights to protect against night time raids. In 1929 the fort was decommissioned. In 1932 it was first placed on the market and sold for £160.

During WW II the old fort was briefly used by the RAF as a military communications relay station. In 2005 it was sold once more for £150,000. Concerns over the security of a nearby LNG jetty were raised in 2013, following the discovery of potential trespasser activity. The fort was sold again in 2020 to a private owner for an undisclosed amount. Land Registry records show that it was sold in January 2021 for £191,000 to community interest company (CIC) Anoniiem.

== Armament ==
The original tower housed three 32-pounder guns, as well as a single 12-pounder for protection of the walls of the dock. From 1859 to 1871, the armaments were changed to sixteen 10-inch and seven 9-inch Rifled Muzzle Loaders. These were replaced with four 12-pounder QF (quick firing) guns in 1902. A small number of men manned the fort during World War I and by this time, only two 12-pounder QF guns remained.
