= Royal Radnor Rifles =

Auxiliary unit of the British Army

Radnorshire Militia Royal Radnor Rifles
- Active: 1558–1876
- Country: England (1558–1707); Kingdom of Great Britain (1707–1800); United Kingdom (1801–1876)
- Branch: Militia
- Role: Infantry
- Size: Regiment
- Garrison/HQ: Presteigne

The Radnorshire Militia, later the Royal Radnor Rifles, was an auxiliary (Note: It is incorrect to describe the British Militia as 'irregular': throughout their history they were equipped and trained exactly like the line regiments of the regular army, and once embodied in time of war they were fulltime professional soldiers for the duration of their enlistment.) regiment reorganised from earlier precursors in the Welsh county of Radnorshire in the 17th century. Primarily intended for home defence, it served in Britain and Ireland through all of Britain's major wars. After a previous short-lived merger it was finally amalgamated into the Royal South Wales Borderers Militia in 1876.

== Radnor Trained Bands ==
The universal obligation to military service in the Shire levy was long established in England and was extended to Wales. King Henry VIII called a 'Great Muster' in 1539, in which William Croft listed all the men between the ages of 16 and 60 in the lordships making up the new county of Radnorshire:

- Town and Lordship of Presteigne: 146 persons, of which 10 were 'horsemen furnished', 22 were 'footmen harnessed' (ie armoured) and 60 were 'able men with gleyves' (Glaives or bills)
- Lordships of Norton, Knighton and Knucklas: 137, of which 4 horse, 14-foot and 62 glaives
- Town and Lordships of Radnor (Radnor 'Foren' (foreign) and Radnor Bridge) and Gladestry: 288, of which 13 horse, 36-foot, 80 glaives, 40 'maris pykes' (pikes) and 93 able men without weapons
- Lordships of Millenethe: 437, of which 13 horse, 36 foot, 164 glaives and 34 pikes
- Lordships of Gwerthronyon: 262, of which 15 horse, 40 foot, 92 glaives, 29 pikes

The legal basis of the militia was updated by two acts of 1557 covering musters (4 & 5 Ph. & M. c. 3) and the maintenance of horses and armour (4 & 5 Ph. & M. c. 2). The county militia was now under the lord lieutenant, assisted by the deputy lieutenants and justices of the peace. The entry into force of these Acts in 1558 is seen as the starting date for the organised Militia of England and Wales. Although the militia obligation was universal, it was clearly impractical to train and equip every able-bodied man, so after 1572 the practice was to select a proportion of men for the trained bands, who were mustered for regular training. In April 1588, ahead of the Spanish Armada crisis, Radnorshire mustered 200 'trayned men reduced into bandes under Captaines and soarted with weapons'. In 1598 the Radnorshire quota was 50 men.

In the 16th century little distinction was made between the militia and the troops levied by the counties for overseas expeditions. However, the counties usually conscripted the unemployed and criminals rather than send the trained bandsmen. Radnorshire earned the government's displeasure for recruiting men from prison, but mainly because they were so 'naked and bare' that the royal treasury was forced to fit them out and sent the bill to the county for settlement. Between 1585 and 1602 Radnorshire supplied 530 men for service in Ireland and 75 for France. The men were given three days' 'conduct money' to get to Bristol, the port of embarkation for Ireland. Conduct money was recovered from the government, but replacing the weapons issued to the levies from the militia armouries was a heavy cost on the counties. As late as 1623, when Ireland was officially at peace, 150 men were levied in Radnorshire and Brecknockshire for service there and sent from Bristol to Waterford, and another 50 from Radnorshire were sent to Plymouth in 1627 (probably for Buckingham's expedition to the Île de Ré).

With the passing of the threat of invasion, the trained bands declined in the early 17th century. Later, King Charles I attempted to reform them into a national force or 'Perfect Militia' answering to the king rather than local control. The Radnorshire Trained Bands of 1638 consisted of 200 men, 112 armed with muskets and 88 'Corslets' (body armour, signifying pikemen). They also mustered 25 horse. For the First Bishops' War in 1639 detachments of trained bandsmen were selected for service from Radnorshire and Herefordshire. The following year Radnorshire was ordered to send 100 men overland to Newcastle upon Tyne for the Second Bishops' War. However, substitution was rife and many of those sent on this unpopular service would have been untrained replacements. These pressed men rioted at Presteigne and the Trained Bands had to step in to prevent them murdering their captain, whom they claimed to be a 'Papist'. The Radnor and Herefordshire Trained Bands then forced the levies to leave the county on their march to Newcastle.

=== Civil Wars ===
Control of the militia was one of the areas of dispute between Charles I and Parliament that led to the English Civil War. When open war broke out between the King and Parliament, neither side made much use of the trained bands beyond securing the county armouries for their own full-time troops. Most of Wales was under Royalist control for much of the war, and was a recruiting ground for the King's armies.

Once Parliament had established full control in 1648 it passed new Militia Acts that replaced lords lieutenant with county commissioners appointed by Parliament or the Council of State. At the same time the term 'Trained Band' began to disappear in most counties. Under the Commonwealth and Protectorate the militia received pay when called out, and operated alongside the New Model Army to control the country. By 1651 the militias of the South Welsh counties appear to have been combined, with the 'South Wales Militia' being ordered to rendezvous at Gloucester to hold the city during the Worcester campaign.

== Radnorshire Militia ==
After the Restoration of the Monarchy, the Militia was re-established in England and Wales by the Militia Act 1661 under the control of the king's lords lieutenant, the men to be selected by ballot. This was popularly seen as the 'Constitutional Force' to counterbalance a 'Standing Army' tainted by association with the New Model Army that had supported Cromwell's military dictatorship.

The militia forces in the Welsh counties were small, and were grouped together under the direction of the Lord President of the Council of Wales. As Lord President, the Duke of Beaufort carried out a tour of inspection of the Welsh militia in 1684, when the Radnorshire units consisted of one Troop of horse and a regiment of three-foot companies 'who gave a good volley'. The 1697 militia returns showed that Radnorshire and Brecknockshire had a combined Regiment of Foot 505 strong under Col Edward Price and a Troop of 48 Horse under Capt Sir Edward Williams.

Generally the militia declined in the long peace after the Treaty of Utrecht in 1713. Jacobites were numerous among the Welsh Militia, but they did not show their hands during the Risings of 1715 and 1745, and bloodshed was avoided.

=== Seven Years' War ===
Under threat of French invasion during the Seven Years' War a series of Militia Acts from 1757 re-established county militia regiments, the men being conscripted by means of parish ballots (paid substitutes were permitted) to serve for three years. There was a property qualification for officers, who were commissioned by the lord lieutenant. An adjutant and drill sergeants were to be provided to each regiment from the Regular Army, and arms and accoutrements would be supplied when the county had secured 60 per cent of its quota of recruits.

Radnorshire was given a quota of 120 men to raise. Some of the Welsh counties were slow to complete their regiments: the problem was less with the other ranks (ORs) raised by ballot than the shortage of men qualified to be officers, even after the requirements were lowered for Welsh counties. The Radnor 'corps' (it was too small to class as a regiment) was eventually formed at Presteigne and received its arms on 21 February 1763. By then the war had ended with the Treaty of Paris, so the new unit was not actually embodied for service. It did, however, carry out peacetime training in the following years, putting on a field day under the command of the Lord Lieutenant (Edward Harley, 4th Earl of Oxford & Mortimer) for the King's birthday in 1771.

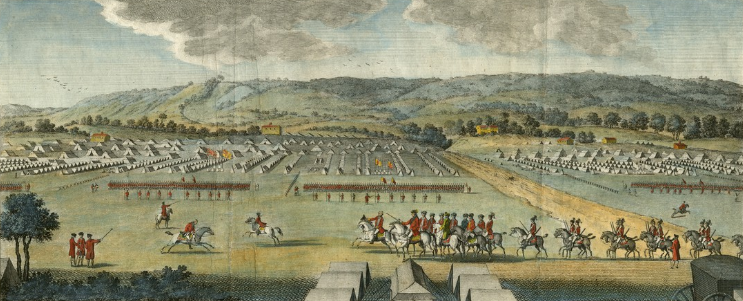
A review at Coxheath Camp.

=== War of American Independence ===
The militia were called out in 1778 after the outbreak of the War of American Independence, when the country was threatened with invasion by the Americans' allies, France and Spain. The Radnorshire Militia were 'embodied' for permanent duty for the first time on 31 March 1778. Later that year an inspecting officer found the Radnorshires to be notably lacking in training, but this was because the corps consisted largely of recruits. In the spring of 1779, organised as two companies under the command of Major John Jones, the regiment was marched to Kent to join Coxheath Camp near Maidstone. This was the army's largest training camp, where the militia were exercised as part of a division alongside regular troops while providing a reserve in case of French invasion of South East England. The understrength militia units from small counties (Anglesey, Carnarvon and Rutland) were attached to guard the artillery park of the division, and they were later criticised as having worked as artillery and forgotten their infantry training.

The Radnorshires were stationed at a militia camp under Lt-Gen Parker at Tiptree in Essex during the summer of 1780, where discipline was so poor that the local parishes complained of bad behaviour and pilfering by men from the camp. Parker had to post a large number of outposts and sentries round the camp to stop men getting out at night. There was also fighting between the Radnorshires and the Cumberland Militia that threatened to spread to other units. Parker called in the commanding officers and demanded that their officers should set an example, but he complained to London that too many officers were absent to vote in that year's General Election. In February 1781 the regiment formed part of the garrison of Landguard Fort, in Suffolk, and in May that year was at Greenwich (then in Kent). By then the time-expired men of 1778 had been replaced by newly balloted men, and the two balloted companies had been supplemented by a 60-strong independent volunteer company.

A peace treaty having been signed, the militia were stood down, the Radnorshires being disembodied on 23 March 1783. From 1784 to 1792 the ballot was used to keep up the numbers of the disembodied militia, but to save money only two-thirds of the men were actually mustered for annual training. Under the command of Maj John Beavan, the Radnorshires were exercised for 28 days in 1787, embodied again in 1788, then carried out annual training in each of the following years.

=== French Revolutionary and Napoleonic Wars ===
The militia was already being called out when Revolutionary France declared war on Britain on 1 February 1793. In March the Radnorshire Militia were stationed in Worcester. By 8 August that year the regiment, two companies strong, was stationed at Canterbury Barracks in Kent.

The French Revolutionary Wars saw a new phase for the English and Welsh militia: they were embodied for a whole generation, and became regiments of full-time professional soldiers (though restricted to service in the British Isles), which the regular army increasingly saw as a prime source of recruits. They served in coast defences, manning garrisons, guarding prisoners of war, and for internal security, while their traditional local defence duties were taken over by the Volunteers and mounted Yeomanry.

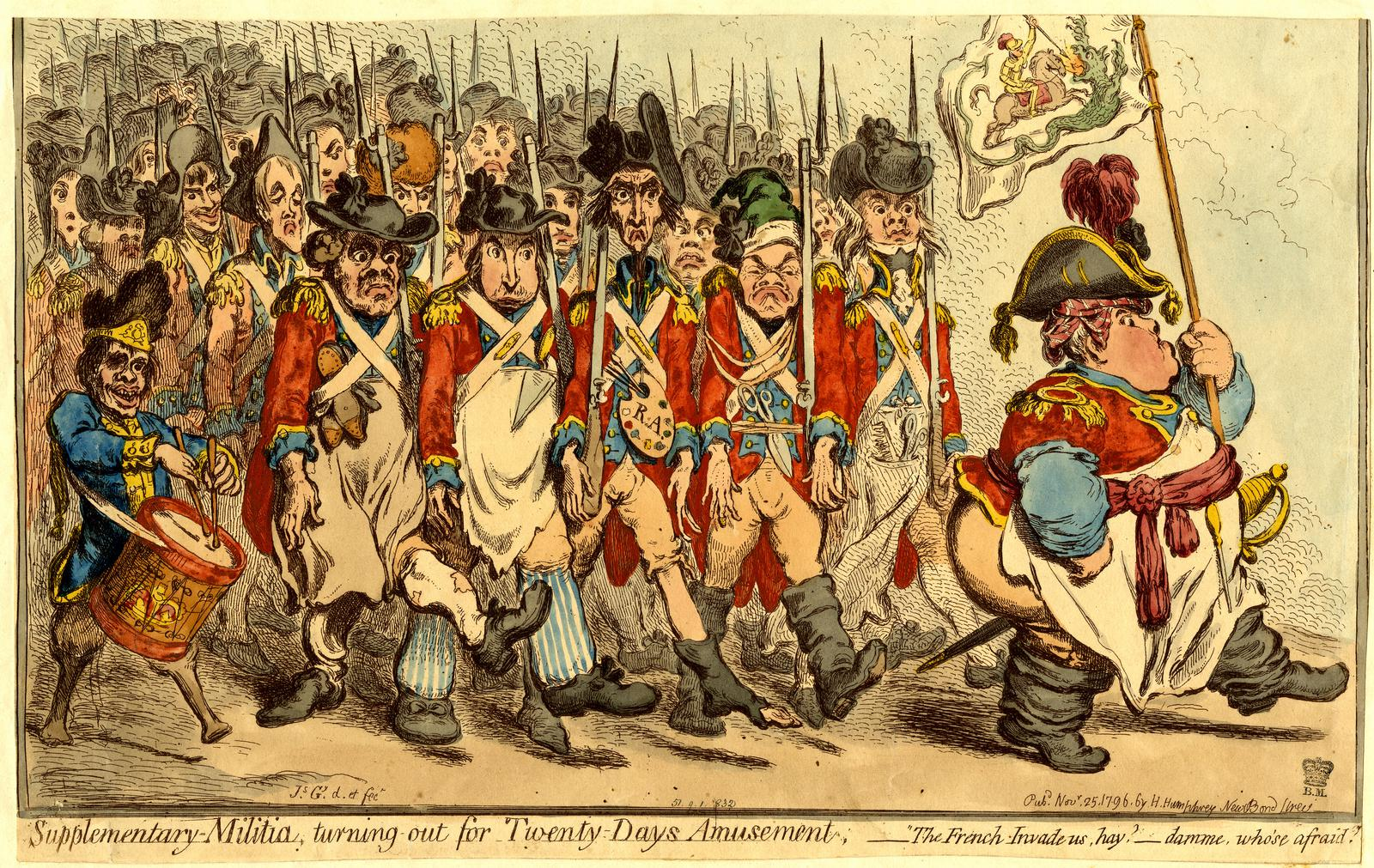
Supplementary-Militia, turning-out for Twenty Days Amusement: 1796 caricature by James Gillray.

In an attempt to have as many men as possible under arms for home defence to release regulars, in 1796 the Government created the Supplementary Militia, a compulsory levy of men to be trained for 20 days a year in their spare time, and to be incorporated in the Regular Militia in emergency. Radnorshire's additional quota was fixed at 220 men.

The militia were regularly moved around the country: in August 1798, for example, the Radnorshires were stationed at Dover. Major John Garbett commanded the regiment from 1797. With the addition of the supplementaries and volunteers it reached a strength of 340 in 1798, and he was promoted to lieutenant-colonel in 1800. However, the demand for volunteers to transfer to the Regular Army reduced all militia regiments at this time. Hostilities ended with the Treaty of Amiens on 27 March 1802, and the militia were disembodied. Radnorshire's quota was now reduced to 105 privates (140 all ranks).

However, the Peace of Amiens was short-lived and Britain declared war on France once more in May 1803. The Radnorshire Militia had already been embodied, Lt-Col Garbett having received the warrant on 14 March. Garbett (who later changed his name to Walsham) was promoted to colonel of the regiment on 10 January 1804, and on 23 April that year, in company with 11 other Welsh Militia regiments, the Radnorshires were granted the title 'Royal'. (Note: The Radnorshires seem to have used the 'Royal' prefix unofficially as early as 1771, and wore blue facings from 1763.)

During the summer of 1805, when Napoleon was massing his 'Army of England' at Boulogne for a projected invasion, the regiment (131 men in 3 companies under Col Walsham Garbett) was deployed with the artillery reserve at Canterbury Barracks and on the coast of Kent.

In common with a number of other Welsh militia regiments, the Royal Radnor was converted into a light infantry regiment on 27 March 1810.

The Interchange Act 1811 passed in July allowed English militia regiments to serve in Ireland and vice versa. The regiment volunteered for this service; it was brought up to strength and by September it was stationed at Armagh. It remained in Ireland until 1813.

=== Local Militia ===
While the Regular Militia were the mainstay of national defence during the Revolutionary and Napoleonic Wars, they were supplemented from 1808 by the Local Militia, which were part-time and only to be used within their own districts. These were raised to counter the declining numbers of Volunteers, and if their ranks could not be filled voluntarily the Militia Ballot was employed. Many of the remaining Volunteer units transferred en masse to the Local Militia, and the rest were disbanded. Instructors were provided by the Regular Militia. Since 1803 the Radnorshire Volunteers had consisted of a single regiment of nine companies under Lt-Col Richard Price, including one keen and active company at Colwyn under Capt Hugh Vaughan. It appears that the Radnorshire Volunteers transferred to the Local Militia, with Price and Vaughan retaining their positions.

=== Long Peace ===
After the Battle of Waterloo ended the Napoleonic Wars in 1815 there was another long peace. The Regular Militia were disembodied and the Local Militia were disbanded in 1816. Although officers continued to be commissioned into the militia and ballots were still held until 1831, the regiments were rarely assembled for training and the permanent staffs of sergeants and drummers (who were occasionally used to maintain public order) were progressively reduced. Edward, 5th Earl of Oxford & Mortimer was appointed Major-Commandant of the Royal Radnor Light Infantry on 23 June 1819; his eldest son, Edward, Lord Harley, took over command on 1 July 1822. In 1840 J. Barnes was major-commandant of the regiment, and John Abraham Whitaker of Newcastle Court, Old Radnor, formerly a captain in the 28th Foot, was appointed on 21 March 1846.

== 1852 Reforms ==
The Militia of the United Kingdom was revived by the Militia Act 1852, enacted during a renewed period of international tension. As before, units were raised and administered on a county basis, and filled by voluntary enlistment (although conscription by means of the militia ballot might be used if the counties failed to meet their quotas). Training was for 56 days on enlistment, then for 21–28 days per year, during which the men received full army pay. Under the Act, militia units could be embodied by Royal Proclamation for full-time home defence service in three circumstances:

1. 'Whenever a state of war exists between Her Majesty and any foreign power'.
2. 'In all cases of invasion or upon imminent danger thereof'.
3. 'In all cases of rebellion or insurrection'.

The Radnorshires were revived as the Royal Radnorshire Rifle Corps in 1853, still with the headquarters at Presteigne. Lawrence Henry Peel, formerly of the 52nd Foot, was appointed major-commandant on 27 March 1854.

War having broken out with Russia in 1854 and an expeditionary force sent to the Crimea, the militia began to be called out for home defence. The Royal Radnor Rifles began their annual training on 11 May that year, and offered their services to the government. However, the regiment was not actually embodied until February 1855. It remained at Presteigne until the end of the war.

Until 1855 the Royal Radnor Rifles' stores and armoury were at 'Church House' or 'Garrison House', just north of St Andrew's Church. In that year a building was purchased for the stores and magazine, but inspecting officers found it damp and unsuitable. The county JPs were told they should repair the building and provide a proper pigsty (it appears that the sergeant in charge kept his pig in the magazine), but they were reluctant to pay out of local taxation.

In 1861 the War Office ordered the amalgamation of the small Welsh militia quotas to form larger regiments. The Royal Radnor Rifles were officially merged with the Royal Cardigan Rifles at Aberystwyth and the Royal Brecon Rifles at Brecon to form the Royal Cardigan, Brecon & Radnor Rifles. This merger was unpopular: the three contingents never trained together, and the COs of the Royal Brecon and Royal Cardigan continued as joint lieutenant-colonels commandant. The mergers were abandoned in 1867 and the Royal Radnor Rifles regained its independence. Captain William J. Thomas, formerly of the 2nd Dragoon Guards, was appointed major-commandant on 16 March 1871.

By the early 1870s the Royal Radnor Rifles were equipped with the short version of the Snider–Enfield rifle, together with a sword bayonet.

Following the Cardwell Reforms a mobilisation scheme began to appear in the Army List from December 1875. This assigned places in an order of battle to Militia units serving alongside Regular units in an 'Active Army' and a 'Garrison Army'. The Royal Radnor Rifles' assigned war station was with the Garrison Army in the Pembroke defences.

In August 1876 the unit was amalgamated once more, this time with the Royal Brecon Rifles to form the Royal South Wales Borderers Militia (remaining a rifle regiment), with its headquarters at Brecon. Major Thomas of the Royal Radnor Rifles was promoted to Lt-Col to command the combined battalion. (Note: The unsuitable old magazine at Presteigne was sold off in 1877.) The new regiment became the 3rd (Royal South Wales Borderers Militia) Battalion, South Wales Borderers in 1881.

== Heritage and ceremonial ==
=== Uniforms and insignia ===
From 1763 the regiment's uniform was red with the blue facings usually associated with 'Royal' regiments. This changed to Rifle green with blue facings when it became a Rifle corps in 1853, the facings changing to scarlet the following year.

From an early date the regiment wore the Prince of Wales's feathers as a badge, its continued use being authorised by Horse Guards in 1808 as a provincial badge (ie denoting Wales, rather than any specific connection to the Prince of Wales). The Royal Radnor Militia's buttons of 1803 bore a design of the Prince of Wales's feathers, coronet and 'Ich Dien' motto, with the letter 'R' either side of the plume and 'M' beneath. The officers' greatcoat of the Royal Radnor Rifles in 1858–81 had black (Rifle) buttons with the letters 'R-R-R' inside the strings of a light infantry bugle-horn with the strings tied into a bow, a crown above. The Shako plate of 1868 had a Maltese cross and wreath, in the centre of which was the Prince of Wales's insignia within a circle inscribed 'ROYAL RADNOR RIFLES'.

=== Precedence ===
During the War of American Independence the order of precedence of county militia regiments was determined by an annual ballot. However, units such as the Radnorshire Militia that did not constitute a full battalion were not included. The order balloted for at the start of the French Revolutionary War in 1793 remained in force throughout the war: Radnorshire was again omitted. Another ballot for precedence took place in 1803 at the start of the Napoleonic War and this time the county was allotted 23rd place. This list remained in force until 1833. In 1833 the King drew the lots for individual regiments, those raised between 1763 and 1783 receiving places 48–69; the Royal Radnor was 50th and retained this position when the list was revised in 1855. Most militia regiments paid little attention to the numeral, but the Radnors' regimental history used it in its title.

== See also ==
- Trained Bands
- Militia (English)
- Militia (Great Britain)
- Militia (United Kingdom)
- Royal South Wales Borderers Militia
