= Royal Cardigan Militia =

Welsh Auxiliary unit of the British Army (1661–1909)

Cardiganshire Militia Royal Cardigan Rifles Royal Cardigan Artillery
- Active: 1661–21 October 1909
- Country: England (1661–1707); Kingdom of Great Britain (1707–1800); United Kingdom (1801–1909)
- Branch: Militia
- Role: Infantry; Garrison Artillery
- Size: Regiment
- Garrison/HQ: Aberystwyth
- Engagements: Battle of Fishguard

The Cardiganshire Militia, later the Royal Cardigan Rifles, was an auxiliary (Note: It is incorrect to describe the British Militia as 'irregular': throughout their history they were equipped and trained exactly like the line regiments of the regular army, and once embodied in time of war they were fulltime professional soldiers for the duration of their enlistment.) regiment reorganised from earlier precursor units in the Welsh county of Cardiganshire (modern Ceredigion) during the 18th century. Primarily intended for home defence, it saw active service at the Battle of Fishguard in 1797 and served in Britain and Ireland through all Britain's major wars. It was converted into garrison artillery in 1877 and continued until it was disbanded in 1909.

== Cardigan Trained Bands ==
The universal obligation to military service in the Shire levy was long established in England and was extended to Wales. King Henry VIII called a 'Great Muster' in 1539, which showed 2858 men available for service in the County of Cardiganshire, of whom 609 had 'harness' (armour), and 184 horsemen.

The legal basis of the militia was updated by two acts of 1557 covering musters (4 & 5 Ph. & M. c. 3) and the maintenance of horses and armour (4 & 5 Ph. & M. c. 2). The county militia was now under the Lord Lieutenant, assisted by the Deputy Lieutenants and Justices of the Peace (JPs). The entry into force of these Acts in 1558 is seen as the starting date for the organised Militia of England and Wales. Although the militia obligation was universal, it was clearly impractical to train and equip every able-bodied man, so after 1572 the practice was to select a proportion of men for the Trained Bands, who were mustered for regular training.

In the 16th century little distinction was made between the militia and the troops levied by the counties for overseas expeditions. However, the counties usually conscripted the unemployed and criminals rather than send the trained bandsmen. Between 1585 and 1602 Cardiganshire supplied 500 men for service in Ireland and 30 for the Netherlands. The men were given three days' 'conduct money' to get to Chester or Bristol, the main ports of embarkation for Ireland. Conduct money was recovered from the government, but replacing the weapons issued to the levies from the militia armouries was a heavy cost on the counties.

With the passing of the threat of invasion, the trained bands declined in the early 17th century. Later, King Charles I attempted to reform them into a national force or 'Perfect Militia' answering to the king rather than local control. The Cardigan Trained Bands of 1638 consisted of 300 men, half armed with muskets and half 'Corslets' (body armour, signifying pikemen). They also mustered 35 horse. Part of this force may have been organised as the North Cardigan Trained Band. Cardiganshire was ordered to send 150 men overland to Newcastle upon Tyne for the Second Bishops' War of 1640. However, substitution was rife and many of those sent on this unpopular service would have been untrained replacements.

=== Civil Wars ===
Control of the militia was one of the areas of dispute between Charles I and Parliament that led to the English Civil War. When open war broke out between the King and Parliament, neither side made much use of the trained bands beyond securing the county armouries for their own full-time troops. Most of Wales was under Royalist control for much of the war, and was a recruiting ground for the King's armies. In 1644 Colonel John Jones of Nanteos raised a regiment in Cardiganshire for Charles I.

Once Parliament had established full control in 1648 it passed new Militia Acts that replaced lords lieutenant with county commissioners appointed by Parliament or the Council of State. At the same time the term 'Trained Band' began to disappear in most counties. Under the Commonwealth and Protectorate the militia received pay when called out, and operated alongside the New Model Army to control the country. By 1651 the militias of the South Welsh counties appear to have been combined, with the 'South Wales Militia' being ordered to rendezvous at Gloucester to hold the city during the Worcester campaign.

== Cardiganshire Militia ==
After the Restoration of the Monarchy, the Militia was re-established by the Militia Act 1661 under the control of the king's lords lieutenant, the men to be selected by ballot. This was popularly seen as the 'Constitutional Force' to counterbalance a 'Standing Army' tainted by association with the New Model Army that had supported Cromwell's military dictatorship.

The militia forces in the Welsh counties were small, and were grouped together under the direction of the Lord President of the Council of Wales. As Lord President, the Duke of Beaufort carried out a tour of inspection of the Welsh militia in 1684, when the Cardiganshire (Note: There was no consistency in whether 'Cardigan' or 'Cardiganshire' was used for the unit's titles, though 'shire' was generally dropped in the 19th century.) Militia consisted of one troop of horse and three companies of foot. The 1697 militia returns showed the Cardigan Regiment as consisting of 142 foot and 60 horse under Col Viscount Lisburne.

Generally the militia declined in the long peace after the Treaty of Utrecht in 1713. Jacobites were numerous amongst the Welsh Militia, but they did not show their hands during the Risings of 1715 and 1745, and bloodshed was avoided.

== 1757 reforms ==
=== Seven Years' War ===
Under threat of French invasion during the Seven Years' War a series of Militia Acts from 1757 re-established county militia regiments, the men being conscripted by means of parish ballots (paid substitutes were permitted) to serve for three years. There was a property qualification for officers, who were commissioned by the lord lieutenant. An adjutant and drill sergeants were to be provided to each regiment from the Regular Army, and arms and accoutrements would be supplied when the county had secured 60 per cent of its quota of recruits.

Cardiganshire was given a quota of 120 men to raise. The Welsh counties were slow to complete their regiments: the problem was less with the other ranks raised by ballot than the shortage of men qualified to be officers, even after the requirements were lowered for Welsh counties. Arms were issued to the Cardiganshire Militia at Aberystwyth on 1 October 1762, and it appears that the regiment carried out a short period of training. However, the war was now drawing to an end, and no further militia were required. The regiment was not embodied for permanent service, and the embodied militia regiments were stood down in 1763.

After 1763 militia training was sporadic, and the Cardigan regiment rarely assembled in a single body: instead the companies trained separately at convenient places in the north, centre and south of the county. In 1764 the adjutant and four men of the permanent staff were called out to salvage and guard the cargo of a ship stranded on the coast. In 1766 and 1769 quantities of weapons and stores held at the town of Cardigan were moved to storage at Aberystwyth, while in 1777 other stores arrived at Cardigan from Carmarthen, probably having been transported by sea.

=== American War of Independence ===
The American War of Independence broke out in 1775, and by 1778 Britain was threatened with invasion by the Americans' allies, France and Spain. The militia were called out, and the Cardigan regiment was embodied for the first time at Aberystwyth on 31 March 1778 under its Major-Commandant, Viscount Vaughan of Trawsgoed, son of the Lord Lieutenant, the Earl of Lisburne. It marched to Swansea to begin garrison duties, but had returned to Aberystwyth by May. It then moved through Ross-on-Wye back to Swansea. In March 1779 the Cardigan Militia moved to Carmarthen, and in June into Pembrokeshire, where its main duty was to guard French prisoners-of-war confined in Pembroke town. On 24 May 1780 Viscount Vaughan was succeeded as major-commandant by John Campbell of Stackpole Court and the regiment marched to Hampshire to take up garrison duties at Portsmouth.

Despite substitutes replacing many of the balloted men, the regiment's ranks contained many relatively well-to-do men. In 1780 a high proportion of the men requested leave to go home to vote in the general election that year: only three officers but 42 other ranks present with the main body and perhaps another 70 on the march had applied, proportionately much higher than for any English regiment for which figures remain.

In 1781 the regimental establishment was increased from 120 privates to 228, the augmentation being achieved by recruiting two volunteer companies paid for by public subscription. The regiment was now organised in six companies and Maj Campbell was promoted to Lieutenant-Colonel. The regiment remained in Hampshire, at Bishop's Waltham in October 1781 and at Winchester before the end of the year. In June 1782 it was back in the Portsmouth area. In October the regiment returned to South Wales to winter quarters in Carmarthen. In February 1783 the Cardigan Militia marched through Aberystwyth on the way to take up duties at Monmouth. However, the Treaty of Paris ended hostilities, and the militia was ordered to stand down on 28 February. In March the regiment returned to Aberystwyth to be disembodied.

From 1784 to 1792 the militia were assembled for their 28 days' annual peacetime training, but to save money only two-thirds of the men were actually mustered each year. The Cardigans, however, were ordered to be completed and trained in 1788.

=== French Revolutionary War ===
The militia was already being embodied when Revolutionary France declared war on Britain on 1 February 1793. In August the Cardigan Militia (120 men in four companies) under the command of Maj William Lewis marched via Gloucester to take up duties on the invasion-threatened Sussex coast. The French Revolutionary Wars saw a new phase for the English militia: they were embodied for a whole generation, and became regiments of full-time professional soldiers (though restricted to service in the British Isles), which the regular army increasingly saw as a prime source of recruits. They served in coast defences, manning garrisons, guarding prisoners of war, and for internal security, while their traditional local defence duties were taken over by the Volunteers and mounted Yeomanry.

In the autumn of 1793 the Cardigan Militia marched to join the garrison of Chester for the winter, with one company detached to Northwich. Early in 1794 it concentrated at Northwich, but rejoined the Chester Garrison in April 1795. In June that year the regiment was called upon to send a detachment to Wrexham to stand by to aid the civil magistrates, but it was not called upon and rejoined the main body. In July the Cardiganshires moved to Cumberland and were stationed in Whitehaven and other towns. On being relieved by the Carmarthenshire Militia in April 1796 the regiment returned to Chester. In August it moved back to West Wales to carry out duties in Pembrokeshire. Regimental headquarters (HQ) was established in Haverfordwest and detachments were employed at Pembroke Dock and other key points. On the march south the regiment had dropped a company at Aberystwyth, where in October it was placed at the disposal of the Revenue officers to assist in preventing smuggling.

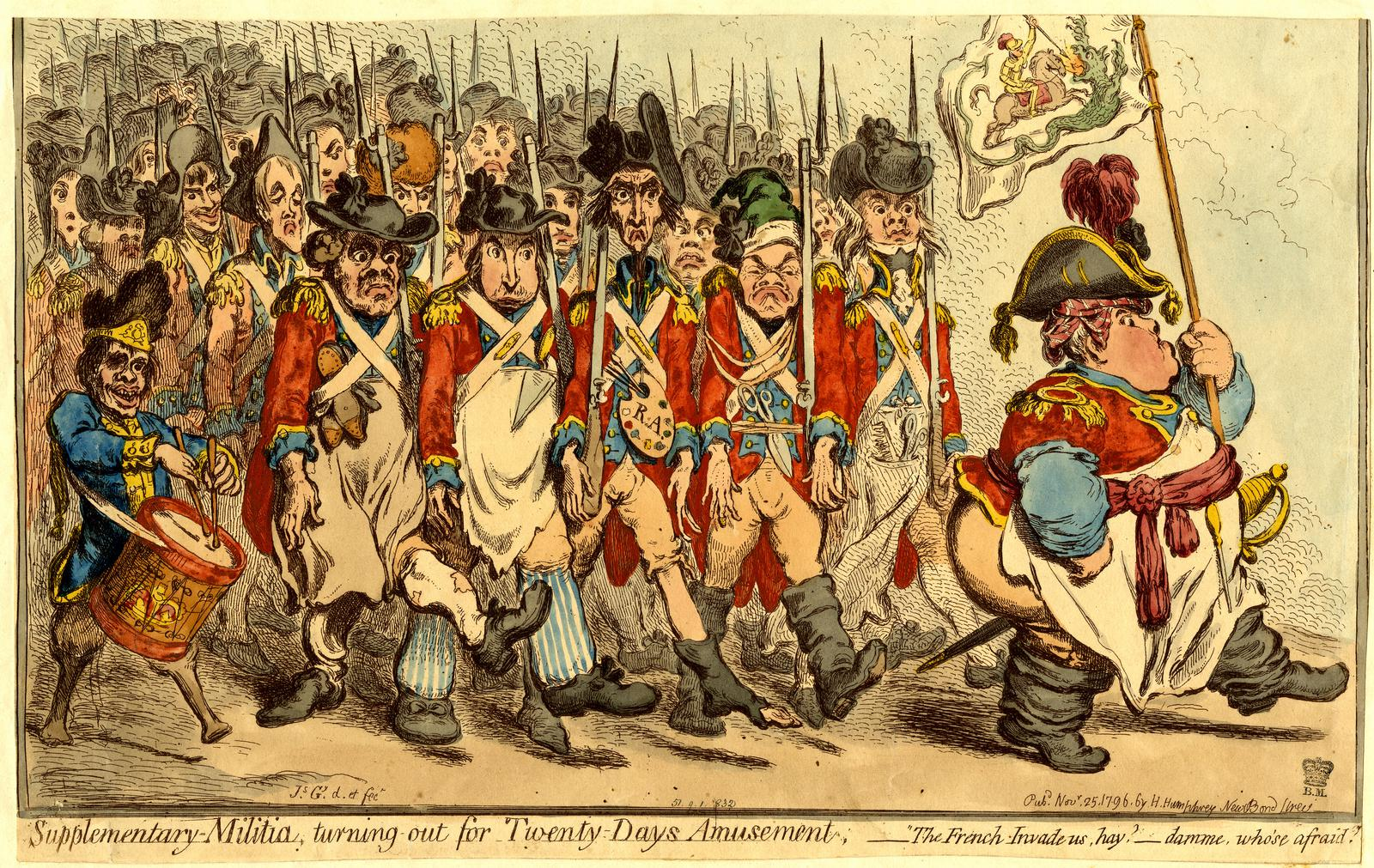
Supplementary-Militia, turning-out for Twenty Days Amusement: 1796 caricature by James Gillray.

In an attempt to have as many men as possible under arms for home defence in order to release regulars, in 1796 the Government created the Supplementary Militia, a compulsory levy of men to be trained for 20 days a year in their spare time, and to be incorporated in the Regular Militia in emergency. Cardigan's new quota was fixed at 474 men, and the regiment sent a party back from Haverfordwest to Aberystwyth to train the supplementaries. Despite the increase, Cardiganshire's quota was less burdensome than the average county: in 1796 only one man in 30 was required, whereas most counties had to supply one in 12–18.

=== Battle of Fishguard ===
In January 1797 regimental HQ summoned a detachment back from Aberystwyth to reinforce the company guarding French prisoners of war at Pembroke Dock. On 22 February a French force made a landing at Fishguard on the north Pembrokeshire coast. A force of militia, yeomanry and volunteers was quickly gathered at Haverfordwest under the command of Lord Cawdor to oppose this invasion. The three officers and 100 men of the Cardigan Militia guarding the prisoners at Pembroke Dock were relieved by the Pembrokeshire Supplementary Militia and marched to join Cawdor. There was some minor skirmishing, but with discipline collapsing among his troops (the Légion Noire) and wrongly believing himself outnumbered by Cawdor's force, the French commander surrendered. The Cardiganshire Militia contingent was present at the surrender on Goodwick Sands on 24 February. (Note: When the Pembrokeshire Yeomanry were awarded the Battle honour Fishguard in 1853, the Royal Cardigan Rifles did not submit a claim, and the honour remained unique to the Yeomanry.)

The Cardigan Militia returned to its duties, with detachments stationed at Haverfordwest, Pembroke Dock, Aberystwyth, Cardigan and Tenby. In November 1798 Lt-Col John Brooks was appointed to command the regiment. In 1799 the militia quotas were relaxed and after bounties had been offered to the supplementary militiamen to enlist in the regular army, the rest of them were stood down.

In September 1800 the Cardigan Militia concentrated at Carmarthen, then moved on to Swansea in October. On 20 April 1801 the regiment was called out to deal with a bread riot in the town, but the protestors dispersed after the Riot Act was read, and no military action was required. The Treaty of Amiens brought hostilities to an end, and the regiment was marched back to Aberystwyth, where it was disembodied on 27 March 1803.

=== Napoleonic War ===
However, the Peace of Amiens was short-lived and Britain declared war on France once more in May 1803. Warrants had already been issued to embody the militia, and the Cardiganshires were marching to Woolwich to join the garrison for the Royal Arsenal and the Dockyard, followed by a contingent of supplementaries. For some years the regiment had unofficially called itself the Royal Cardiganshire Militia: the Royal title was officially conferred upon it (together with a number of other Welsh regiments) in April 1804. In July the regiment was in Hampshire where it was shipped from Portsea to the Isle of Wight, where duties included guarding prisoners and manning the forts and redoubts protecting the island and the approaches to the Solent and Spithead. Some of the men were trained to assist the gunners in the forts. On 11 September, John Palmer Chichester of Arlington Court, formerly Brigade of Guards, was appointed commanding officer in succession to Col Brooks.

From Hampshire the regiment marched back to Kent where, during the summer of 1805 when Napoleon was massing his 'Army of England' at Boulogne for a projected invasion, the regiment was stationed at Dungeness Barracks, with 325 men in 4 companies under Lt-Col Chichester, forming part of Maj-Gen Sir John Moore's force. In February 1806 it had detachments stationed at Maidstone and in the Dungeness forts. By January 1807 it was at Sheerness, where the regiment volunteered for service in Ireland. The offer was not accepted, but a number of the men transferred to the regular army, especially the 23rd Foot (Royal Welch Fusiliers). As a result, the regiment was reduced to 174 privates, of whom 120 were substitutes: 150 new men had to be selected by ballot in Cardiganshire. In May 1808 the Royal Cardigan left Sheerness and moved first to Ospringe Barracks near Faversham, and then to Deal for duties in the coastal defences and Martello towers. The regiment volunteered for service in the Peninsular War, but the offer was again turned down. In 1810 the regiment was redesignated the Royal Cardigan Light Infantry, when the drums were replaced by bugles and the sergeants exchanged their Spontoons for fusils.

Although the volunteer corps had been reformed after the resumption of the war, their quality varied widely and their numbers steadily declined. One of the chief reasons to join was to avoid the militia ballot. They were supplemented from 1808 by the Local Militia, which were part-time and only to be used within their own districts. If their ranks could not be filled voluntarily the militia ballot was employed. However, discipline in the Local Militia was sometimes poor. At the annual training in 1810, there disturbances in the Upper Tivy Local Militia at Aberystwyth.

=== Ireland ===
The Interchange Act 1811 allowed English and Welsh militia regiments to serve in Ireland and vice versa. In July, while stationed at Deal, the Cardigan Militia once again volunteered for service in Ireland, and this time was accepted. It arrived on 8 August and was first stationed at Loughrea and later at Limerick. While in Limerick the regiment changed its role again in 1812, this time to a rifle corps as the Royal Cardigan (Rifles), (Note: The official title was changed to Royal Cardigan Riflemen in 1824, and to Royal Cardigan Rifle Corps in 1825, but it was usually referred to simply as the Royal Cardigan Rifles.) involving a change of uniform and weapons.

The Irish tour of duty ended on 17 September 1813 when the regiment embarked from Cove of Cork for Portsmouth. It was sent to guard prisoners of war at Porchester Castle and later went into barracks at Gosport. In March 1814 fresh recruits arrived from Cardigan to replace men who had transferred to regiments of the line, but Napoleon abdicated in April 1814, and with the war ending the militia recruiting parties were ordered to cease their activity. Orders were issued to disembody most of the militia, and the Royal Cardigan Rifles marched back to Aberystwyth to be disembodied on 11 July 1814. It was not one of the regiments re-embodied during the short Waterloo Campaign

=== Long peace ===
There was another long peace after Waterloo and the militia were neglected. Due to the disturbed nature of the countryside in 1819 the weapons in the Welsh militia armouries were deactivated by removing their flint locks and bayonets, leaving only sufficient serviceable arms for the permanent staff. The Royal Cardigan Rifles retained a regimental band paid for by the officers. In 1820 the ballot was enforced and weapons wee reactivated to complete the regiment for annual training, which was repeated in 1821 and 1825. William E. Powell of Nanteos, a former cavalry officer, was promoted to Lt-Col to succeed Col Chichester as commanding officer in 1823. The militia permanent staffs were reduced in 1829, but in 1831 civil disturbances led to the Royal Cardigan Rifles being drawn out for training, the last time the militia ballot was enforced in the county. After 1831 neither ballots nor training were held for the militia, and although officers continued to be commissioned by the lord lieutenant the permanent staffs and armouries were repeatedly reduced.

== 1852 Reforms ==
The Militia of the United Kingdom was revived by the Militia Act 1852, enacted during a renewed period of international tension. As before, units were raised and administered on a county basis, and filled by voluntary enlistment (although conscription by means of the Militia Ballot might be used if the counties failed to meet their quotas). Training was for 56 days on enlistment, then for 21–28 days per year, during which the men received full army pay. Under the Act, militia units could be embodied by Royal Proclamation for full-time home defence service in three circumstances:

1. 'Whenever a state of war exists between Her Majesty and any foreign power'.
2. 'In all cases of invasion or upon imminent danger thereof'.
3. 'In all cases of rebellion or insurrection'.

Obtaining the 300 recruits to complete the Royal Cardigan Rifles was hampered by opposition from the strongly Nonconformist community in Cardiganshire, and some men from outside the county had to be enlisted. In 1854 Lt-Col William T.R. Powell (formerly of the 37th Foot) succeeded Col William E. Powell as CO. The revived regiment finally carried out its first 21 days' training at Aberystwyth in March 1856. Since 1809 the regiment had used the Shire Hall in Aberystwyth as its regimental HQ and Armoury. The Shire Hall was demolished in 1855 and the HQ and armoury were accommodated, along with the sergeant-major's family, in a town house in Bridge Street. Consequently, the men had to be billeted in overcrowded inns and lodging houses during their annual training.

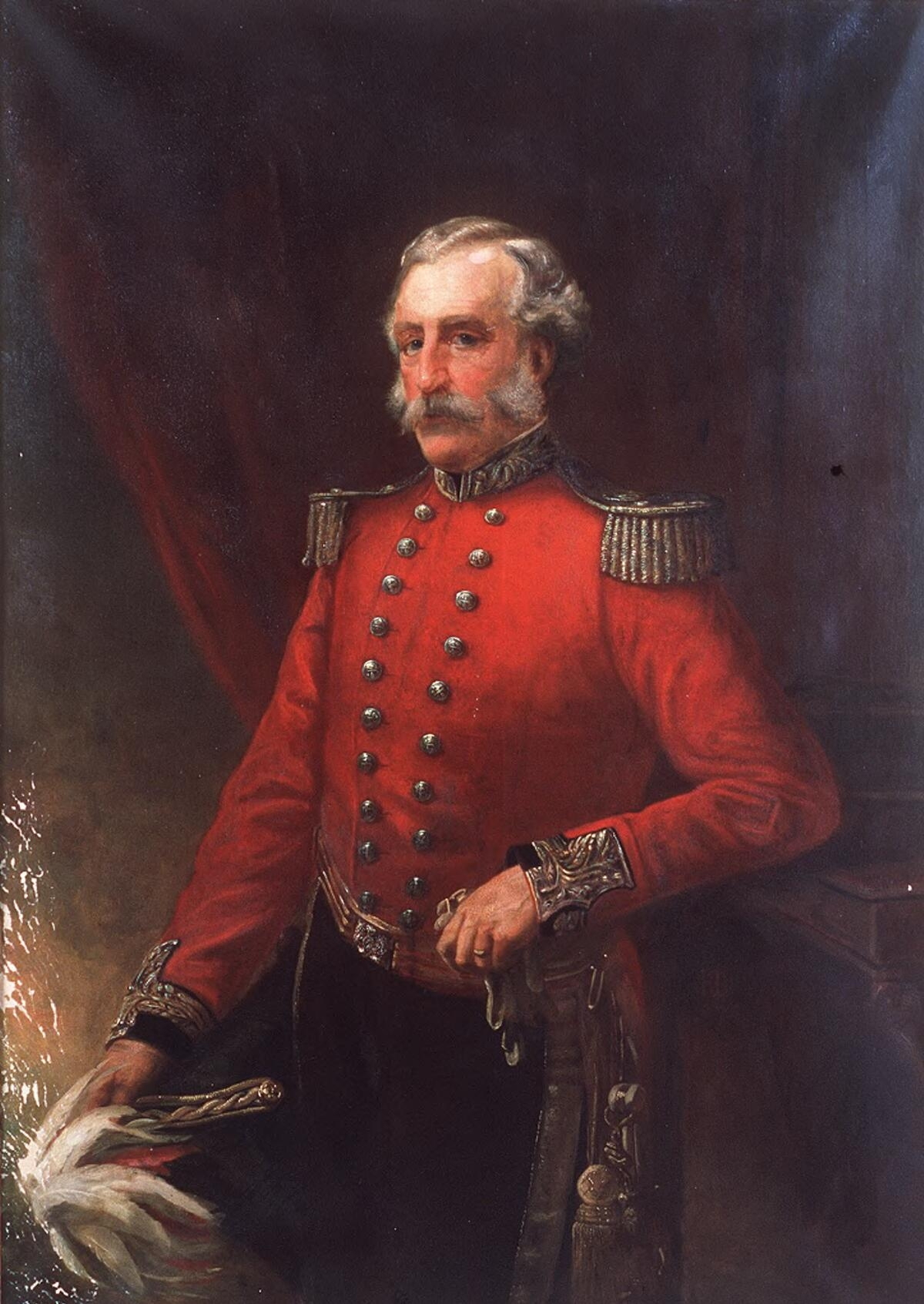
Col Edward Pryse, probably in the uniform of Lord Lieutenant of Cardiganshire, ca 1890.

In 1861 the War Office ordered the amalgamation of the small Welsh militia quotas to form larger regiments. The Royal Cardigan Rifles were officially merged with the Royal Brecknockshire Rifles at Brecon and the Royal Radnor Rifles at Presteigne to form the Royal Cardigan, Brecon & Radnor Rifles. The merger was unpopular: the three contingents never trained together, and the COs of the Royal Brecon and Royal Cardigan (Lt-Col Edward Pryse of Peithyll from 1865) continued as joint lieutenant-colonels commandant. The mergers were abandoned in 1867 and the Royal Cardigan Rifles regained its independence. A purpose-built Militia Barracks, designed by Sir James Szlumper, was constructed for the regiment in Borth Road, Abersytwyth, in 1867.

Under the 'Localisation of the Forces' scheme introduced by the Cardwell Reforms of 1872, Militia units were grouped into county brigades with their local Regular and Volunteer battalions – Sub-District No 25 in Western District for the Royal Cadigan Rifles, grouped with the 24th Foot and the Monmouthshire, Radnor and Brecknock militia regiments. Following the Cardwell Reforms a mobilisation scheme began to appear in the Army List from December 1875. This assigned places in an order of battle to Militia units serving alongside Regular units in an 'Active Army' and a 'Garrison Army'. The Royal Cardigan's assigned war station was with the Garrison Army in the Pembroke defences.

== Royal Cardigan Artillery ==
The 1852 Act introduced Artillery Militia corps in addition to the traditional infantry regiments. Their role was to man coastal defences and fortifications, relieving the Royal Artillery (RA) for active service. The Royal Carmarthen and Royal Pembrokeshire regiments had been converted to artillery militia in 1861, and trained alongside the Royal Cardigan Rifles in the Pembroke Garrison. Somewhat belatedly the War Office decided to convert the Royal Cardigan Rifles, which became the Royal Cardigan Artillery on 1 April 1877. Lieutenant-Col Pryse retired, to become the independent unit's first Honorary Colonel, and was succeeded by Lt-Col J.A. Lloyd Phillips of Mabws. The infantry adjutant and drill sergeants of the permanent staff were replaced by artillerymen, and drill purpose guns were installed at Aberystwyth Militia Barracks for training. Later, a battery for live firing practice was installed in the grounds of Aberystwyth Castle overlooking the sea. Two of these may have been 64-pounder rifled muzzle-loaders that were still in use for training in 1880. At least four guns were in the battery in 1902. The establishment of the unit was set at 342 other ranks, but at first it fell short of this number. Recruiting improved, and in 1881 the establishment was raised to 414, organised into four batteries.

The Royal Artillery and Militia Artillery were reorganised on 14 April 1882, when 11 territorial divisions of garrison artillery were formed, each consisting of a number of brigades. (Note: In contemporary Royal Artillery terminology, a 'brigade' was a group of batteries grouped together for administrative rather than tactical purposes, the officer in command normally being a lieutenant-colonel rather than a brigadier-general or major-general, the ranks usually associated with command of an infantry or cavalry brigade.) In each division the 1st Brigade was composed of Regular RA batteries, the others being a varying number of militia corps. The Royal Cardigan Artillery joined the Welsh Division, becoming 5th Brigade, Welsh Division, RA.

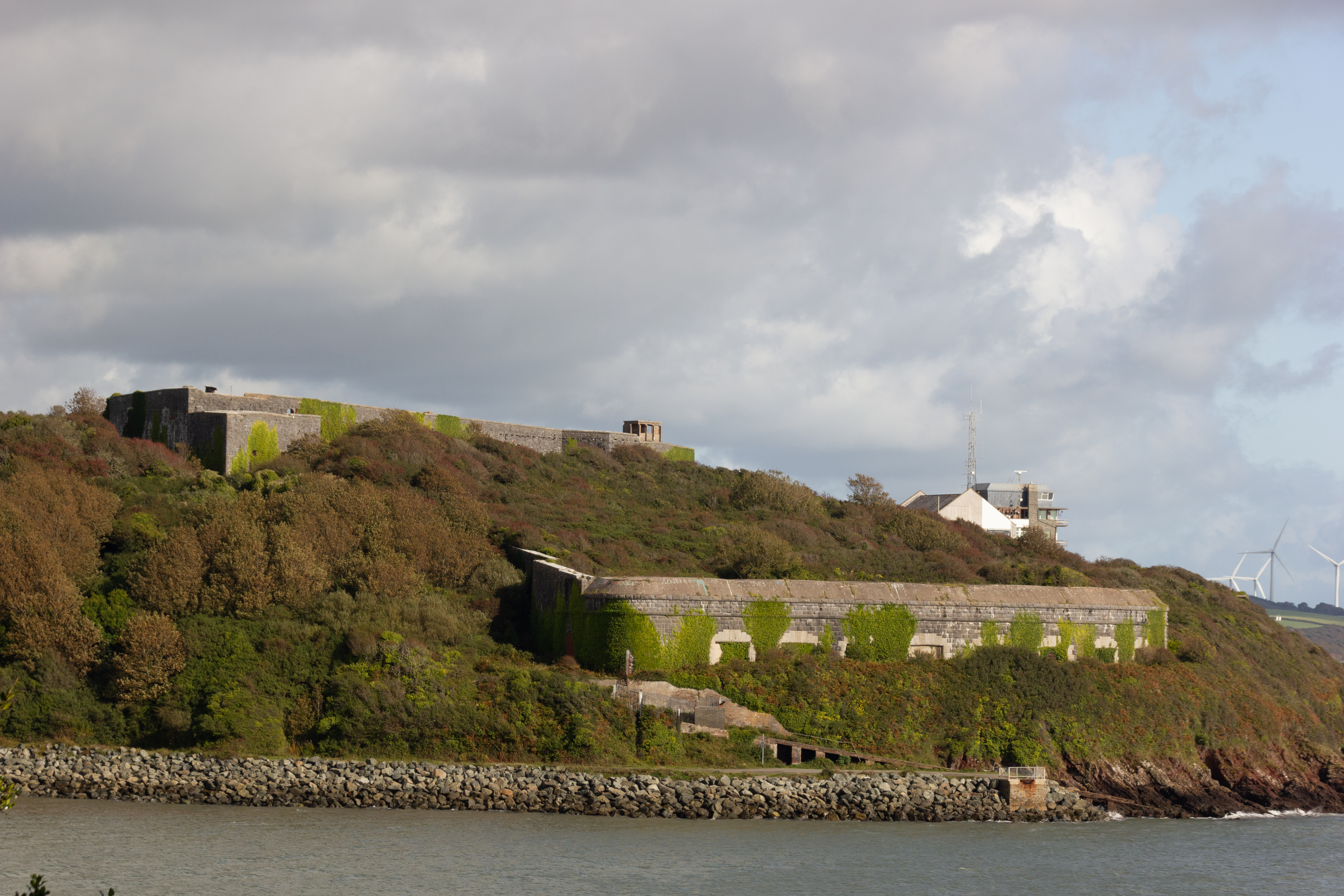
Fort Hubberstone, Milford Haven.

In 1889 the territorial divisions were reorganised into three large divisions of garrison artillery, the units regaining their county titles (though without any 'Royal' prefixes). The brigade based in Aberystwyth was redesignated The Cardigan Artillery (Western Division, RA), with its establishment increased to 619 other ranks in six batteries. Annual training was now carried out on the guns in the Milford Haven defences (usually at Fort Hubberstone or South Hook Fort), which was also the unit's war station.

The RA was divided into field and garrison branches in 1899, with all the militia and volunteer units becoming part of the Royal Garrison Artillery (RGA). The RGA's divisional structure was abolished in 1902, when the unit became the Cardigan Royal Garrison Artillery (Militia)

During the Second Boer War the Cardigan Artillery was embodied from 2 May to 5 October 1900 and manned South Hook Fort. Although it did not serve overseas, two of its officers served with 15th Company, Western Division RGA, and were awarded the campaign medals.

== Disbandment ==
After the Boer War, the future of the Militia was called into question. There were moves to reform the Auxiliary Forces (militia, yeomanry and volunteers) to take their place in the six Army Corps proposed by St John Brodrick as Secretary of State for War. Some batteries of militia artillery were to be converted to field artillery. However, little of Brodrick's scheme was carried out.

Under the sweeping Haldane Reforms of 1908, the Militia was replaced by the Special Reserve, a semi-professional force whose role was to provide reinforcement drafts for regular units serving overseas in wartime. Although the Cardigan RGA (M) accepted transfer to the Special Reserve Royal Field Artillery, as the Cardigan Royal Field Reserve Artillery in April 1908, it was disbanded on 21 October 1909.

== Commanders ==
The following served as commanding officer of the regiment:

- John Vaughan, 1st Viscount Lisburne in 1697
- Maj Viscount Vaughan of Trawsgoed 1778–80
- Maj John Campbell of Stackpole Court appointed 24 May 1780, promoted lt-col by 1781
- Maj William Lewis in 1780, promoted colonel by 1798
- Lt-Col John Brooks appointed November 1798, promoted colonel 10 June 1803
- Lt-Col John Palmer Chichester of Arlington Court, formerly Brigade of Guards, appointed 11 September 1804
- Col William E. Powell of Nanteos, formerly Royal Horse Guards and 18th Hussars, appointed major 3 December 1811, promoted colonel 15 December 1823
- Lt-Col William T.R. Powell, formerly 37th Foot, appointed 2 October 1852
- Lt-Col Edward Pryse of Peithyll, formerly 6th Dragoon Guards appointed 27 May 1865 (joint Lt-Col Cmdt of Royal Cardigan, Brecon & Radnor until 1867), retired 1877
- Lt-Col J.A. Lloyd-Phillips of Mabws appointed 22 April 1877, died 1884
- Lt-Col George Griffith Williams of Wallog appointed 4 June 1884, resigned 1887
- Lt-Col Thomas Lloyd, CB, appointed 1887
- Lt-Col Gilbert Jones, former regular officer, appointed 26 October 1903

=== Honorary Colonels ===
The following served as Honorary Colonel of the unit:

- Lloyd V. Watkins (appointed to Royal Brecknock 30 August 1860; continued with combined regiment)
- Lt-Col Edward Lewis Pryse, former CO, appointed 11 July 1877
- J. Lewes, appointed 11 August 1888

=== Other notable officers ===
- Sir William Wiseman, 10th Baronet, future intelligence officer, was commissioned into the unit on 30 April 1902.

== Heritage and ceremonial ==
=== Uniforms and insignia ===
When the regiment was inspected in 1684 the Company colours of the foot were white (suggesting that they may have worn white facings on their coats), while the cornet of the troop of horse was white with a scroll inscribed 'PRO REGE' ('For the King') surmounted by a right arm holding a red heart.

The Regimental colour issued to the Cardigan Militia in 1762 was made of green silk, matching the green facings on its red coats. In line with the other Welsh militia regiments, the flag probably bore the Coat of arms of the Lord Lieutenant of Cardiganshire, at that time the Earl of Lisburne. After 1779 the regimental colour was made of Garter blue silk to match the changed facings. From the time it became a rifle corps the regiment gave up regimental colours and was clothed in Rifle green uniforms with scarlet facings, similar to the King's Royal Rifle Corps.

An officer's Gorget of ca 1770 is engraved with the Royal arms and 'GR' cypher above a scroll carrying the title 'CARDIGAN'; by ca 1800 this design had changed to the Prince of Wales's feathers, coronet and 'Ich Dien' motto scroll over the word 'CARDIGAN' and was also used on the shoulder belt plate. The buttons carried the Prince of Wales's device surrounded by a belt carrying the title 'CARDIGAN'. In ca 1857 the other ranks' Forage caps had a two-part badge, with a stringed bugle-horn above a scroll inscribed 'ROYAL CARDIGAN'. Between 1867 and 1877 the officers' silver pouch belt plate consisted of a crowned Maltese cross, in the centre of which was a stringed bugle-horn surrounded by a circle inscribed 'ROYAL CARDIGAN RIFLES', the cross having small decorative balls on the eight points and small lions in the four angles; the whole was surrounded by a laurel wreath.

On conversion to artillery in 1877 the regiment adopted the blue uniform with red facings of the RA. The helmet plate and officers' pouchbelt carried standard RA insignia, with the 'CARDIGAN ARTILLERY' wording restored in 1889.

=== Precedence ===
During the War of American Independence the order of precedence of county militia regiments was determined by an annual ballot. However, units such as the Carnarvon Militia that did not constitute a full battalion were not included. The order balloted for at the start of the French Revolutionary War in 1793 remained in force throughout the war; Cardiganshire was again left out. Another ballot for precedence took place in 1803 at the start of the Napoleonic War and remained in force until 1833: Cardiganshire was 27th. In 1833 the King drew the lots for individual regiments and the resulting list continued in force with minor amendments until the end of the militia. The regiments raised before the peace of 1763 took the first 47 places but the Cardigan Militia raised in 1762 were included in the second group (1763–83), presumably because their first embodiment had not been until 1778; they became 64th. When the Royal Cardigan Rifles amalgamated with the Royal Brecknock and Royal Radnor in 1861, the combined unit inherited this precedence. Most militia regiments paid little attention to the numeral.

In 1855 the first 29 regiments of artillery militia were given precedence numbers in alphabetical order; later regiments took the next available number, with the Royal Cardigan Artillery assigned 33rd when it was converted in 1877.

== See also ==
- Trained Bands
- Militia (English)
- Militia (Great Britain)
- Militia (United Kingdom)
- Welsh Division, Royal Artillery
- Western Division, Royal Artillery
- Militia Artillery units of the United Kingdom and Colonies

== Notes ==
- W.Y. Baldry, 'Order of Precedence of Militia Regiments', Journal of the Society for Army Historical Research, Vol 15, No 57 (Spring 1936), pp. 5–16. Archived 4 October 2022 at the Wayback Machine
- Steve Brown, 'Home Guard: The Forces to Meet the Expected French Invasion/1 September 1805' at The Napoleon Series (archived at the Wayback Machine).
- C.G. Cruickshank, Elizabeth's Army, 2nd Edn, Oxford: Oxford University Press, 1966.
- Col John K. Dunlop, The Development of the British Army 1899–1914, London: Methuen, 1938.
- Mark Charles Fissel, The Bishops' Wars: Charles I's campaigns against Scotland 1638–1640, Cambridge: Cambridge University Press, 1994, ISBN 0-521-34520-0.
- Sir John Fortescue, A History of the British Army, Vol I, 2nd Edn, London: Macmillan, 1910.
- Sir John Fortescue, A History of the British Army, Vol II, London: Macmillan, 1899.
- Sir John Fortescue, A History of the British Army, Vol III, 2nd Edn, London: Macmillan, 1911.
- Sir John Fortescue, A History of the British Army, Vol V, 1803–1807, London: Macmillan, 1910.
- Lt-Col James Moncrieff Grierson (Col Peter S. Walton, ed.), Scarlet into Khaki: The British Army on the Eve of the Boer War, London: Sampson Low, 1899/London: Greenhill, 1988, ISBN 0-947898-81-6.
- * Col George Jackson Hay, An Epitomized History of the Militia (The Constitutional Force), London: United Service Gazette, 1905/Ray Westlake Military Books, 1987, ISBN 0-9508530-7-0/Uckfield: Naval & Military Press, 2015 ISBN 978-1-78331-171-2.
- Richard Holmes, Soldiers: Army Lives and Loyalties from Redcoats to Dusty Warriors, London: HarperPress, 2011, ISBN 978-0-00-722570-5.
- Roger Knight, Britain Against Napoleon: The Organization of Victory 1793–1815, London: Allen Lane, 2013/Penguin, 2014, ISBN 978-0-141-03894-0.
- Norman E.H. Litchfield, The Militia Artillery 1852–1909 (Their Lineage, Uniforms and Badges), Nottingham: Sherwood Press, 1987, ISBN 0-9508205-1-2.
- Col K. W. Maurice-Jones, The History of Coast Artillery in the British Army, London: Royal Artillery Institution, 1959/Uckfield: Naval & Military Press, 2005, ISBN 978-1-845740-31-3.
- Bryn Owen, History of the Welsh Militia and Volunteer Corps 1757–1908: Carmarthenshire, Pembrokeshire and Cardiganshire, Part 1: Regiments of Militia, Wrexham: Bridge Books, 1995, ISBN 1-872424-51-1.
- Bryn Owen, History of the Welsh Militia and Volunteer Corps 1757–1908: Denbighshire and Flintshire, Part 1: Regiments of Militia, Wrexham: Bridge Books, 1997, ISBN 1-872424-57-0.
- Maj H.G. Parkyn, 'Welsh Militia Regiments 1757–1881: Their Badges and Buttons', Journal of the Society for Army Historical Research, Vol 32, No 130 (Summer 1954), pp. 57–63. Archived 14 October 2022 at the Wayback Machine
- Christopher L. Scott, The military effectiveness of the West Country Militia at the time of the Monmouth Rebellion, Cranfield University PhD thesis 2011. Archived 27 November 2022 at the Wayback Machine
- Arthur Sleigh, The Royal Militia and Yeomanry Cavalry Army List, April 1850, London: British Army Despatch Press, 1850/Uckfield: Naval and Military Press, 1991, ISBN 978-1-84342-410-9.
- Edward M. Spiers, The Army and Society 1815–1914, London: Longmans, 1980, ISBN 0-582-48565-7.
- Dame Veronica Wedgwood, The King's War 1641–1647: The Great Rebellion, London: Collins, 1958/Fontana, 1966.
- J.R. Western, The English Militia in the Eighteenth Century: The Story of a Political Issue 1660–1802, London: Routledge & Kegan Paul, 1965.

== External sources ==
- David Plant, British Civil Wars, Commonwealth & Protectorate, 1638–1660 (The BCW Project) Regimental Wiki.
