= Royal Brecknockshire Militia =

Auxiliary unit of the British Army

Brecknockshire Militia Royal Brecknockshire Rifles Royal South Wales Borderers Militia 3rd (Reserve) Bn, South Wales Borderers
- Active: 1661–1953
- Country: England (1661–1707); Kingdom of Great Britain (1707–1800); United Kingdom (1801–1953)
- Branch: Militia/Special Reserve
- Role: Infantry
- Size: 1 Battalion
- Part of: South Wales Borderers
- Garrison/HQ: The Barracks, Brecon
- Engagements: Second Boer War

The Brecknockshire Militia, later the Royal Brecknockshire Rifles, was an auxiliary (Note: It is incorrect to describe the British Militia as 'irregular': throughout their history they were equipped and trained exactly like the line regiments of the regular army, and once embodied in time of war they were fulltime professional soldiers for the duration of their enlistment.) regiment reorganised from earlier precursor units in the Welsh county of Brecknockshire during the 17th Century. Primarily intended for home defence, it served in Britain and Ireland through all Britain's major wars. After a series of shortlived mergers it was finally amalgamated into the Royal South Wales Borderers Militia in 1876. This regiment's title and headquarters at Brecon were adopted in 1881 when the South Wales Borderers (SWB) was formed as the local regiment of the Regular Army. The battalion saw active service during the Second Boer War. It became at Special Reserve battalion of the SWB and trained thousands of recruits for the fighting battalions of the regiment during World War I. After 1921 the militia had only a shadowy existence until its final abolition in 1953.

== Brecknockshire Trained Bands ==
The universal obligation to military service in the Shire levy was long established in England and was extended to Wales. King Henry VIII called a 'Great Muster' in 1539, which showed 2015 men available for service in the Lordship of Brecknock (including the town of Brecon and the Lordship of Crickhowell).

The legal basis of the militia was updated by two acts of 1557 covering musters (4 & 5 Ph. & M. c. 3) and the maintenance of horses and armour (4 & 5 Ph. & M. c. 2). The county militia was now under the Lord Lieutenant, assisted by the Deputy Lieutenants and Justices of the Peace (JPs). The entry into force of these Acts in 1558 is seen as the starting date for the organised Militia of England and Wales. Although the militia obligation was universal, it was clearly impractical to train and equip every able-bodied man, so after 1572 the practice was to select a proportion of men for the Trained Bands, who were mustered for regular training. It was these men who were called out during the Spanish Armada crisis of 1588.

In the 16th Century little distinction was made between the militia and the troops levied by the counties for overseas expeditions. However, the counties usually conscripted the unemployed and criminals rather than send the trained bandsmen. Between 1585 and 1602 Brecknockshire supplied 825 men for service in Ireland and 30 for the Netherlands. The men were given three days' 'conduct money' to get to Chester or Bristol, the main ports of embarkation for Ireland. Conduct money was recovered from the government, but replacing the weapons issued to the levies from the militia armouries was a heavy cost on the counties.

With the passing of the threat of invasion, the trained bands declined in the early 17th Century. Later, King Charles I attempted to reform them into a national force or 'Perfect Militia' answering to the king rather than local control. The Brecknock Trained Bands of 1638 consisted of 300 men, 180 armed with muskets and 120 'Corslets' (body armour, signifying pikemen). They also mustered 30 horse. Brecknockshire was ordered to send 200 men overland to Newcastle upon Tyne for the Second Bishops' War of 1640. However, substitution was rife and many of those sent on this unpopular service would have been untrained replacements. Many of the soldiers objected to serving under Roman Catholic officers, including Henry O'Brien and John Fitzgerald among the captains conducting the Brecknock contingent to Newcastle.

=== Civil Wars ===
Control of the militia was one of the areas of dispute between Charles I and Parliament that led to the English Civil War. When open war broke out between the King and Parliament, neither side made much use of the trained bands beyond securing the county armouries for their own full-time troops. Most of Wales was under Royalist control for much of the war, and was a recruiting ground for the King's armies. However, the Brecknock 'County Troop' of horse under Lieutenant-Colonel Jefferies was mustered at Crickhowell in 1645.

Once Parliament had established full control in 1648 it passed new Militia Acts that replaced lords lieutenant with county commissioners appointed by Parliament or the Council of State. At the same time the term 'Trained Band' began to disappear in most counties. Under the Commonwealth and Protectorate the militia received pay when called out, and operated alongside the New Model Army to control the country. By 1651 the militias of the South Welsh counties appear to have been combined, with the 'South Wales Militia' being ordered to rendezvous at Gloucester to hold the city during the Worcester campaign.

== Brecknockshire Militia ==
After the Restoration of the Monarchy, the Militia was re-established by the Militia Act 1661 under the control of the king's lords lieutenant, the men to be selected by ballot. This was popularly seen as the 'Constitutional Force' to counterbalance a 'Standing Army' tainted by association with the New Model Army that had supported Cromwell's military dictatorship.

The militia forces in the Welsh counties were small, and were grouped together under the direction of the Lord President of the Council of Wales. As Lord President, Henry Somerset, 1st Duke of Beaufort carried out a tour of inspection of the Welsh militia in 1684, when the Brecknockshire Militia consisted of one troop of horse under a Captain, and a regiment of five Foot Companies commanded by a Colonel. Beaufort reviewed them in a field near Brecon 'where they were drawn up to exercise, and made several close and laudable firings'. The 1697 militia returns showed that Brecknock and Radnorshire had a combined Regiment of Foot 505 strong under Col Edward Price and a Troop of 48 Horse under Capt Sir Edward Williams.

Generally the militia declined in the long peace after the Treaty of Utrecht in 1713. Jacobites were numerous amongst the Welsh Militia, but they did not show their hands during the Risings of 1715 and 1745, and bloodshed was avoided.

=== Seven Years' War ===
Under threat of French invasion during the Seven Years' War a series of Militia Acts from 1757 re-established county militia regiments, the men being conscripted by means of parish ballots (paid substitutes were permitted) to serve for three years. There was a property qualification for officers, who were commissioned by the lord lieutenant. An adjutant and drill sergeants were to be provided to each regiment from the Regular Army, and arms and accoutrements would be supplied when the county had secured 60 per cent of its quota of recruits.

Brecknockshire was given a quota of 160 men to raise. Some of the Welsh counties were slow to complete their regiments: the problem was less with the other ranks (ORs) raised by ballot than the shortage of men qualified to be officers, even after the requirements were lowered for Welsh counties. Nevertheless, the Brecknock 'corps' (it was too small to class as a regiment) was formed and received its arms on 6 December 1759. It was embodied for permanent service on 29 January 1760 under the command of Col Sir Edward Williams, 5th Baronet.

In July 1760 the Brecknockshires were moved from Abergavenny to Yarmouth in Norfolk to relieve the Norfolk Militia who were guarding French prisoners-of-war. The march took 20 days to complete. In November the unit was relieved by the 2nd Norfolk Militia and returned to its own county for the winter. In May 1761 the Brecknockshires were ordered to Bristol to relieve the Monmouthshire Militia. On arrival they were immediately ordered to continue their march to Bideford in North Devon, to guard French prisoners. In the summer of 1761 the Brecknockshires were stationed at Barnstaple in North Devon, where the main duty was again to guard prisoners-of-war and provide escorts when they were moved between Barnstaple and Plymouth. In October the Brecknock unit marched in company with the Carmarthenshire and Denbighshire Militia from Barnstaple back to Bideford to relieve the 1st Devon Militia, which had been carrying out similar duties. Later that month the unit was relieved by the North Gloucestershire Militia and went home to Brecon for the winter. In June 1762 the Brecknockshires and Monmouthshires were again quartered at Pilmouth, Barnstaple, to guard the French prisoners, but in August the Brecknockshires moved to Plymouth. In September they marched back to their own county. By now the war was coming to an end, and the militia were ordered to call in their detachments and quarter their men conveniently for disembodiment, which followed at the end of the year.

The disembodied units were kept up to strength by means of the ballot over subsequent years, but were rarely assembled for training.

=== American War of Independence ===
The American War of Independence broke out in 1775, and by 1778 Britain was threatened with invasion by the Americans' allies, France and Spain. The militia were embodied for garrison duty and coastal defence. In the summer of 1780 the Brecknockshires formed part of the large garrison of Plymouth. On 12 August there was a serious riot brought on by a quarrel at a 'disorderly house' in the Dock area between some of the Brecknockshire Militia and the two black musicians of the Somerset Militia band. A large mob formed and the Somersets armed with bayonets and assisted by the Herefordshire Militia attempted to storm the Brecknocks' lines, despite the efforts of the officers. The mob surged towards Stoke Church, where the picquet guard of the 97th Foot was ordered to fire, killing two and wounding nine. This and the persuasion of the officers quelled the trouble.

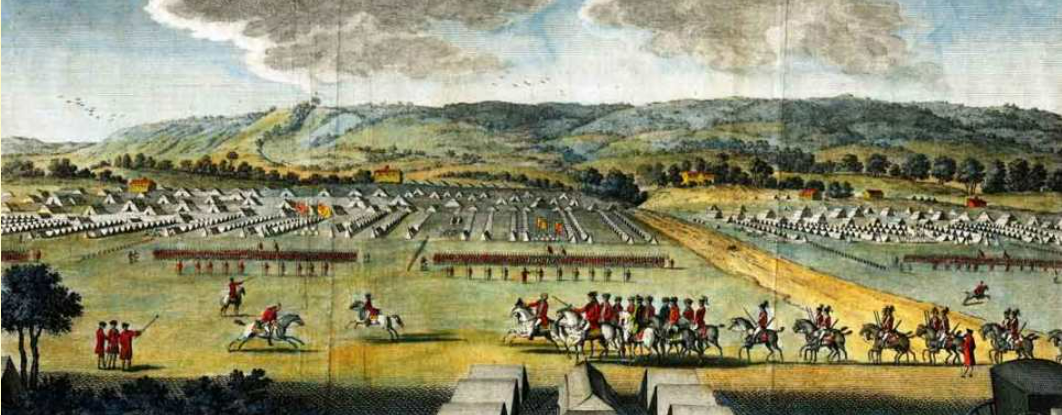
Coxheath Camp in 1778.

In Summer 1781 and spring 1782 the Brecknockshires were at Coxheath Camp near Maidstone in Kent. This was the army's largest training camp, where the militia were exercised as part of a division alongside regular troops while providing a reserve in case of French invasion of South East England. In 1781 it was with the Monmouthshire and other regiments under the command of Lt-Gen Gage, and in 1782 it was part of a brigade including the Merionethshire and Pembrokeshire Militia regiments and Sir John Leicester's Dragoons, all commanded by Lt-Col Colby of the Pembrokes. By the end of the year a peace treaty had been agreed and the war was coming to an end, so warrants to disembody the militia were issued on 28 February 1783.

From 1784 to 1792 the militia ballot was used to keep up militia numbers and the regiments were assembled for their 28 days' annual peacetime training, but to save money only two-thirds of the men were actually mustered each year.

== Monmouth and Brecon Militia ==
=== French Revolutionary War ===
The militia was already being called out when Revolutionary France declared war on Britain on 1 February 1793. It was decided to combine the Brecknockshire and Monmouthshire militia contingents into a single stronger battalion under the command of Henry Somerset, 5th Duke of Beaufort, Lord Lieutenant of both counties and colonel of the Monmouths since 1771. The regiment was initially designated the 'Brecon & Monmouth' Militia, but this was reversed to Monmouth & Brecon Militia the following year. Much of the work of the embodiment and amalgamation fell to the Duke's eldest son, the Marquess of Worcester, who was commissioned as Major on 1 February; Lt-Col the Earl of Abergavenny was not appointed until 5 April. On 21 February the Brecknockshire contingent was ordered to proceed to Newbury, Berkshire, on 4 March, where the amalgamation was carried out. At the time the actual strength of the 'incorporated battalion' was only 240 out of a combined quota of 400.

The French Revolutionary Wars saw a new phase for the English militia: they were embodied for a whole generation, and became regiments of full-time professional soldiers (though restricted to service in the British Isles), which the regular army increasingly saw as a prime source of recruits. They served in coast defences, manning garrisons, guarding prisoners of war, and for internal security, while their traditional local defence duties were taken over by the Volunteers and mounted Yeomanry.

In April 1793 a wave of rioting occurred in the West of England and militia units were sent there, including the Monmouth & Brecon, which was ordered to march from Newbury to Wells, Somerset. On 30 May two companies were ordered to Shepton Mallet to aid the civil authorities. Two further companies were sent, then in June all four were sent to Warminster in Wiltshire to escort prisoners-of-war to Bath, Somerset before returning to Wells. Towards the end of June first one and then a second company were sent to Taunton to suppress riots. They were relieved by the Montgomeryshire Militia on 11 July and proceeded to Shepton Mallet. On 30 September the four companies at Wells were sent to Bristol for riot duty until mid-October when they were relieved by the Cornwall Militia and returned to Wells, with one company detached at Glastonbury. The battalion remained in Somerset for the winter.

In May 1794 the whole battalion marched to camp at Maker heights overlooking Plymouth Sound as part of a militia brigade. It remained there during the summer months, and then in November was sent to winter quarters across Devonshire, with two companies at Honiton, two at Ottery St Mary and two at Topsham. By April 1795 the battalion was spread further, with companies at Axminster, Exmouth and Sidmouth as well. In May it returned to Maker Camp for the summer. Winter quarters for 1795–6 were to be at Devizes in Wiltshire, but it soon moved to Lymington in Hampshire, allegedly because Lt-Col Lord Abergavenny did not like the cold lodgings of Devizes for his wife. The whole regiment was accommodated in Lymington Barracks (except for a few days in May when it was marched out to Eling Barracks during elections in Lymington) until the summer of 1796, which it spent at Barham Downs Camp in Kent. After winter quarters in Lewes, Sussex, the regiment moved out to Brighton between June and August 1797. While at Brighton there was a mutiny in the regiment, the men demanding money instead of their bread and meat rations; this was quelled after a series of courts-martial. In October the regiment went to Eastbourne and then on to Worthing. About now the regiment was expanded from six to nine companies, including a Grenadier Company and a Light Company. From June 1798 the Monmouth & Brecon Militia were stationed at Bristol for the next three years.

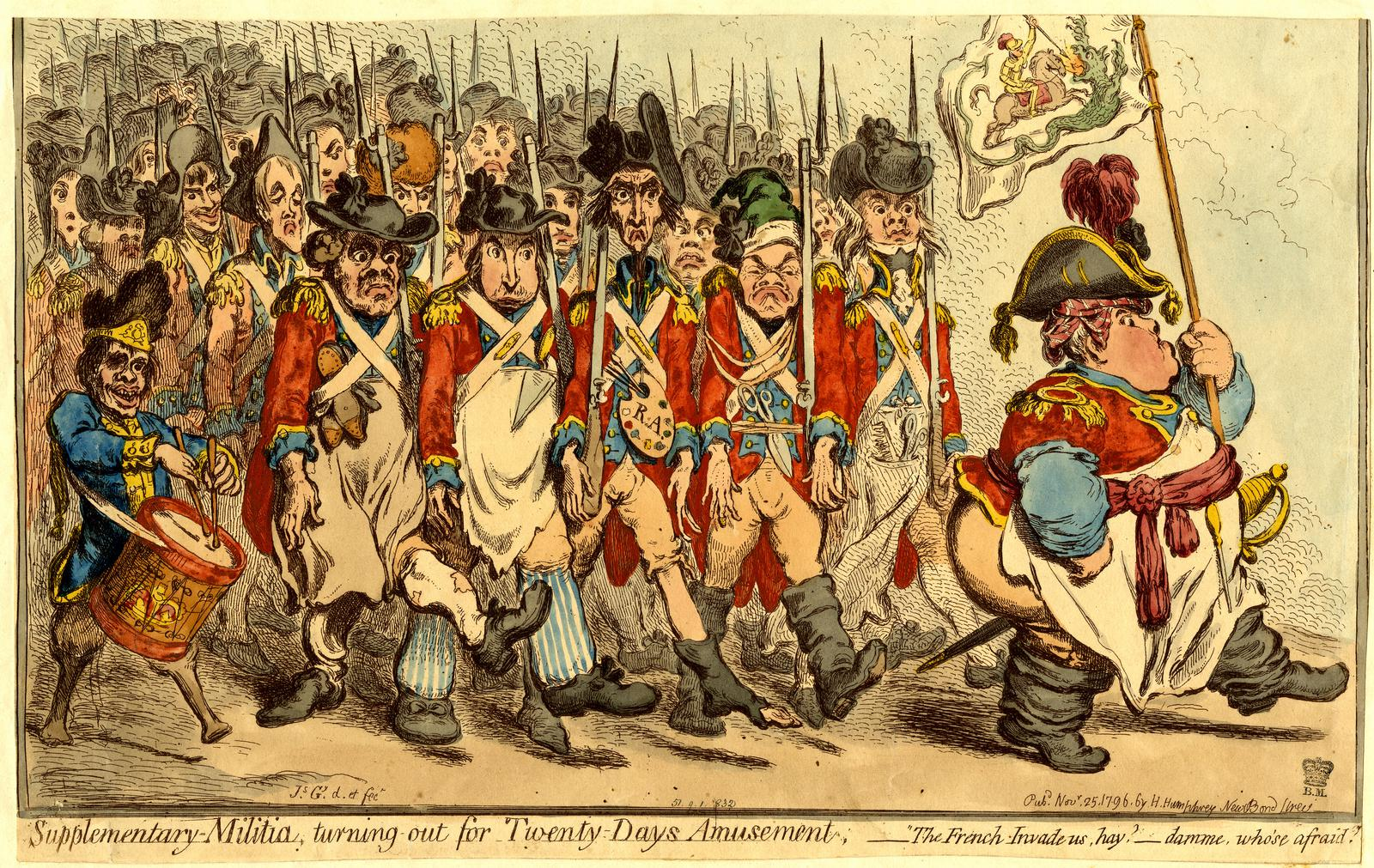
Supplementary-Militia, turning-out for Twenty Days Amusement: 1796 caricature by James Gillray.

In an attempt to have as many men as possible under arms for home defence in order to release regulars, in 1796 the Government created the Supplementary Militia, a compulsory levy of men to be trained for 20 days a year in their spare time, and to be incorporated in the Regular Militia in emergency. Brecon's new quota was fixed at 340 men and Monmouth's at 360. The Duke of Beaufort and Marquess of Worcester carefully inspected the men selected and rejected many as unfit. The two counties' supplementaries joined the regiment at Eastbourne just before it left for Bristol and formed two additional companies.

However, by 1799 the threat of invasion had receded and some of the militia could be stood down. At the end of the year the Monmouth and Brecon was reduced to six companies once more, many of the men having been persuaded to volunteer for the Regular Army. By 1802 Brecon's militia quota had been reduced to 204 men and Monmouth's to 280.

From Bristol the regiment was redeployed across the Welsh Borders: by April 1801 two companies were at Shrewsbury, two at Kidderminster, and one each at Much Wenlock and Bridgnorth. In May the companies proceeded to Fort Monckton at Gosport, Hampshire, but by July the regiment was at Colchester Barracks in Essex. Peace negotiations were now under way, and in November the regiment was ordered back to Brecon and Monmouth. It was disembodied in April 1802 after the signature of the Treaty of Amiens.

=== Napoleonic Wars ===
The Peace of Amiens was short-lived and the warrant to call out the Monmouth & Brecon Militia once more was issued on 18 March 1803. Under the 1802 quotas the regiment was seven companies strong, four from Monmouth and three from Brecon. The Duke of Beaufort, Earl of Abergavenny and Marquess of Worcester were still the three field officers, and the Duke's younger son, Lord Arthur Somerset was commissioned as a captain on 24 June and as major on 5 August.

The regiment concentrated at the town of Monmouth and then marched to Winchester in Hampshire. After six weeks there, it moved into camp at Stokes Bay, Gosport, alongside the Carmarthen and Hereford Militia. The duties included boat and hospital guards round Gosport and Haslar, guarding prisoners-of-war, and manning Fort Blockhouse. In November the encampment broke up, with the Monmouth & Brecons going into Haslar Barracks for the winter.

Following the Duke of Beaufort's death, his son the Marquess of Worcester succeeded as 6th Duke, and was promoted to colonel of the Monmouth & Brecon Militia on 26 October 1803. The Earl of Abergavenny retired on ground of ill-health and Sir Samuel Brudenell Fludyer, 2nd Baronet succeeded him as Lt-Col on 1 July 1805. In April 1804, in company with 11 other Welsh Militia regiments, the Monmouth & Brecons were granted the title 'Royal'.

The regiment shared Haslar Barracks with the Glamorgan, Hereford and Merioneth Militia, providing the same guards as before. It was relieved by the 2nd Bn King's German Legion on 11 March 1804 and crossed to Portsmouth, where it was accommodated in Portsea Barracks with a detachment at Fort Cumberland. On 11 May it marched out to Chichester, later moving to Blatchington. On 26 October it moved on to Lewes, where it was stationed for a year. When the regiment left Portsmouth it had been recruited up to a strength of 23 officers, 36 sergeants and 747 ORs. However, during 1805 a large number of officers and ORs volunteered for the regulars, with the regiment supplying a draft of 111 men in April, of which three officers and 81 men joined the 35th Foot. (Lord Arthur Somerset had already transferred to the 7th Foot) The Royal Monmouth & Brecon left Lewes on 12 October 1805, and after staying at Blatchington until Christmas, it went to Horsham until 3 February 1806, when it was stationed at Steyning for four months. On 24 June the regiment returned to Chichester, where it stayed for a year.

When the Royal Monmouth & Brecon Militia left Chichester on 17 September 1807, four companies went to Bognor and three to Aldwick. Because the regiment was understrength it sent recruiting parties to Brecon and Monmouth to drum up volunteers. The regiment moved back to Steyning in October. It marched to Bristol on 6 June 1808 689 strong, the recruiting parties having brought in 400 men. However, training and discipline were poor, with drunkenness and desertion rife. There was also Black market trading with the prisoners-of-war the regiment were guarding at Stapleton Prison. Nevertheless, with the encouragement of the Duke of Beaufort the regiment supplied 169 volunteers to the regulars, and the recruiting parties had to go back to Brecon and Monmouth. On 6 November 1810 the regiment marched out of Bristol to Berry Head in Devon, where fortifications protected the naval anchorage of Torbay. In the summer of 1811 a proportion of the men were granted leave to help at harvest time. On 29 August the regiment marched to Pendennis Castle in Cornwall, resting for two weeks at Truro en route. It returned to Bristol on 24 June 1812. The Dean of Bristol had a well-known dislike of the military, and after a number of complaints from him the Duke of Beaufort ordered that all music and drums should be discontinued during morning and evening church services, later extended to a ban throughout Bristol. In October the regiment was marched out to Tetbury and Wotton-under-Edge while elections were being held in Bristol. Sir John Fludyer resigned his commission in August 1812 and Maj Thomas Lewis was promoted to succeed him. The Duke of Beaufort was at the time commanding Severn District. In April 1813 a draft of 72 men from the Monmouth & Brecon Militia who had volunteered for the regulars landed in the Peninsula from Bristol, and many of them took part in the Battle of Vittoria still wearing their militia uniforms.

=== Brecon Local Militia ===
While the Regular Militia were the mainstay of national defence during the Revolutionary and Napoleonic Wars, they were supplemented from 1808 by the Local Militia, which were part-time and only to be used within their own districts. These were raised to counter the declining numbers of Volunteers, and if their ranks could not be filled voluntarily the Militia Ballot was employed. Many of the remaining Volunteer units transferred en masse to the Local Militia, and the rest were disbanded. Instructors were provided by the Regular Militia. The Loyal Brecknock Volunteers had been formed on 28 September 1803 as the 1st, 2nd (or Wyeside) and 3rd Battalions. These were replaced by two regiments each of eight companies, both headquartered at Brecon:

- East Brecon Local Militia, raised 24 September 1808
- West Brecon Local Militia, raised 23 March 1809

The local Militia was stood down in 1815 and disbanded in 1816.

=== Ireland ===
The Interchange Act 1811 passed in July allowed English and Welsh militia regiments to serve in Ireland, and the Royal Monmouth & Brecon accepted this liability. After Irish militia units had arrived to join the Bristol garrison, the regiment embarked on 17 July 1813. The Duke of Beaufort remained behind because of his parliamentary duties. The regiment reached Dublin on 23 July and marched out to Tullamore, arriving on 27 July. From Tullamore a number of small detachments were stationed in surrounding towns. The men were subjected to 'frequent insults', and regimental orders issued in August instructed sentries: 'If any person or persons approach at Night to ask Questions, the reply must be "Stand Off I am loaded",' though the colonel expressed confidence that his men would not fire 'unless compelled to do so in their own Personal Defence or to Protect property which may be intrusted to their charge'.

Although the war was coming to an end, large numbers of volunteers were still required for the regular army and on 8 January 1814 four officers and 149 ORs left to join the 1st Foot Guards, 51st Foot, Royal Waggon Train and other units. By 1 April 1814 the regiment's strength was 387, then a further officer and 27 men left on 7 April 1814, mainly for the 51st Foot. Napoleon abdicated on 6 April, and militia recruitment was suspended on 16 April.

However, Ireland was still in a disturbed state and the regiment's outlying detachments were engaged in a number of skirmishes, with several men being killed. Napoleon's escape from Elba early in 1815, leading to the short Waterloo campaign meant that the planned disembodiment of the militia was suspended. The Royal Monmouth & Brecon Militia remained at Tullamore, though time-expired men were allowed to go home. The regiment marched out of Tullamore on 12 September, reaching Carrick-on-Suir on 18 September. In November it sailed for Bristol, and was disembodied at Monmouth on 6 January 1816. During the 13 years the Royal Monmouth & Brecon Militia had been embodied it had supplied over 3000 recruits to the regular army.

=== Long Peace ===
After Waterloo there was another long peace. Although officers continued to be commissioned into the militia and ballots were still held, the regiments were rarely assembled for training and the permanent staffs of sergeants and drummers (who were occasionally used to maintain public order) were progressively reduced. The ballot was suspended by the Militia Act 1829. The combined Royal Monmouth & Brecon Militia was broken up in 1820 and the Royal Brecknock Militia and Royal Monmouthshire Militia continued as separate regiments. Major Francis Chambre went to the Royal Brecknocks and was promoted to Lt-Col Cmdt on 16 October 1838. His adjutant was Capt Egerton Isaacson, who had first been commissioned into the Monmouth & Brecon Militia in 1812 and had then served with the 52nd Light Infantry in the Peninsula and at Waterloo.

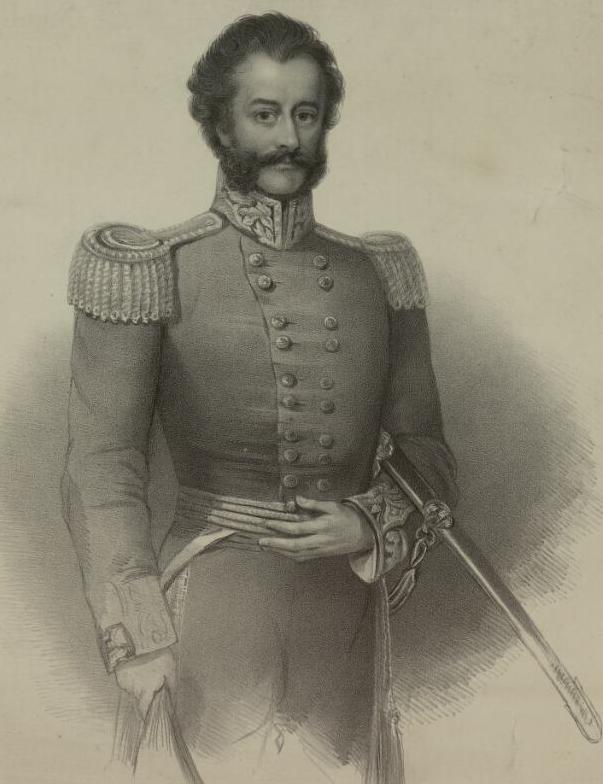
Lt-Col John Lloyd Vaughan Watkins, MP

In 1845–46 there was an effort to replace elderly members of the permanent staff and to appoint a few younger officers from the county gentry, though they had no duties to perform. John Lloyd Vaughan Watkins, Member of Parliament for Brecon and Lord Lieutenant of Brecknockshire, became Lt-Col Commandant on 16 November 1847. His adjutant, appointed on 7 February 1846, was Capt J.D. Dickinson, a wounded veteran of the First Anglo-Afghan War with the 2nd Foot.

== 1852 Reforms ==
The Militia of the United Kingdom was revived by the Militia Act 1852, enacted during a renewed period of international tension. As before, units were raised and administered on a county basis, and filled by voluntary enlistment (although conscription by means of the Militia Ballot might be used if the counties failed to meet their quotas). Training was for 56 days on enlistment, then for 21–28 days per year, during which the men received full army pay. Under the Act, militia units could be embodied by Royal Proclamation for full-time home defence service in three circumstances:

1. 'Whenever a state of war exists between Her Majesty and any foreign power'.
2. 'In all cases of invasion or upon imminent danger thereof'.
3. 'In all cases of rebellion or insurrection'.

The Brecon-based regiment was revived as the Royal Brecknock Rifles; Lt-Col Watkins remained in command, with Capt Dickinson promoted to major and second-in-commend; several of the new officers had served in the Regular Army.

War having broken out with Russia in 1854 and an expeditionary force sent to the Crimea, the militia began to be called out for home defence. The Royal Brecknock Rifles were embodied at the beginning of 1855 but remained at Brecon until the end of the war. Lieutenant-Col Watkins retired on 30 August 1860 and was appointed the regiment's first Honorary Colonel; Maj Dickinson was promoted to succeed him as commanding officer.

In 1861 the War Office ordered the amalgamation of the small Welsh militia quotas to form larger regiments. The Royal Brecknock Rifles were officially merged with the Royal Cardigan Rifles at Aberystwyth and the Royal Radnor Rifles at Presteigne to form the Royal Cardigan, Brecon & Radnor Rifles. The merger was unpopular: the three contingents never trained together, and the COs of the Royal Brecon and Royal Cardigan continued as joint lieutenant-colonels commandant. The mergers were abandoned in 1867 and the Royal Brecon Rifles regained its independence.

The Militia Reserve introduced in 1867 consisted of present and former militiamen who undertook to serve overseas in case of war.

== Cardwell Reforms ==
Under the 'Localisation of the Forces' scheme introduced by the Cardwell Reforms of 1872, the militia were brigaded with their local regular and volunteer battalions on 1 April 1873. For the Royal Brecon Rifles this was in Sub-District No 25 (Counties of Cardigan, Radnor, Brecon and Monmouth) with the following units:

- 1st and 2nd Battalions 24th (2nd Warwickshire) Regiment of Foot
- Royal Monmouthshire Light Infantry Militia at Monmouth
- Royal Brecon Rifles Militia at Brecon
- Royal Cardigan Rifles Militia at Aberystwyth
- 1st Administrative Battalion, Brecknockshire Rifle Volunteer Corps at Brecon
- 1st Administrative Battalion, Monmouth Rifle Volunteer Corps at Newport
- 2nd Administrative Battalion, Monmouth Rifle Volunteer Corps at Pontypool
- 2nd Monmouth Rifle Volunteers at Pontypool

Because there had been no regular regiment affiliated with these counties, the 2nd Warwickshire was arbitrarily assigned. The Brigade Depot was established at Brecon. The affiliation was not entirely popular: the Town Council of Monmouth was afraid that it would lose business if the Monmouth LI's annual training moved to Brecon.

The militia now came under the War Office rather than their county lords lieutenant and battalions had a large cadre of permanent staff (about 30). Around a third of the recruits and many young officers went on to join the Regular Army.

Following the Cardwell Reforms a mobilisation scheme began to appear in the Army List from December 1875. This assigned places in an order of battle to Militia units serving Regular units in an 'Active Army' and a 'Garrison Army'. The Royal Brecon Rifles' assigned war station was with the Garrison Army in the Pembroke defences.

In August 1876 the regiment was amalgamated once more, this time with the Royal Radnor Rifles to form the Royal South Wales Borderers Militia (remaining a rifle regiment), with its headquarters at Brecon.

=== South Wales Borderers ===
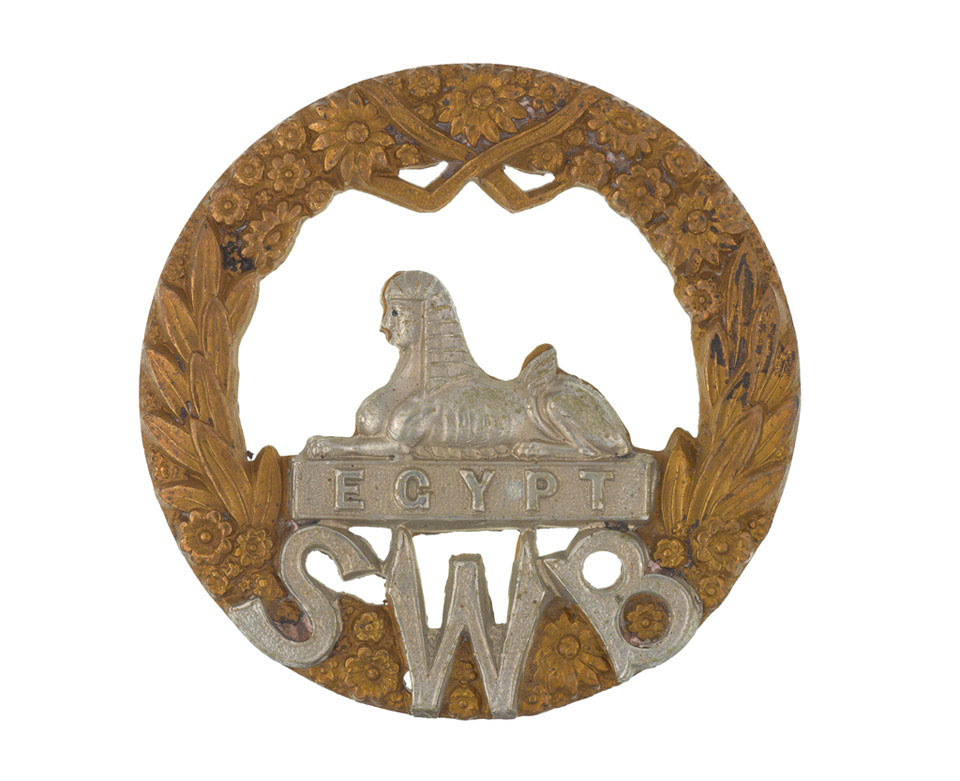
1896 cap badge of the South Wales Borderers

The Childers Reforms took Cardwell's reforms further, with the linked battalions forming single regiments from 1 July 1881. The Royal Monmouth Light Infantry had been converted into a unit of the Royal Engineers in 1877, so the Royal South Wales Borderers became the senior militia battalion (3rd Bn), while the Royal Cardigan Rifles were replaced by the Royal Montgomeryshire Rifles, which became the 4th Bn. The 24th Foot, which had been casually assigned to a Welsh region, became the South Wales Borderers, unusually taking the title of one of its militia battalions. The militia battalions could not transfer their 'Royal' titles and Rifles uniforms, however.

=== Second Boer War ===
At the start of the Second Boer War in 1899, most regular army battalions were sent to South Africa, the Militia Reserve was mobilised to reinforce them, and many militia units were called out to replace them for home defence. The 3rd Bn SWB was embodied 23 January 1900. The battalion volunteered for overseas service and embarked with 26 officers and 709 ORs under the command of Lt-Col C. Healy. It arrived at Cape Town on 8 March 1900 and proceeded to Newton Camp, Kimberley. Headquarters and the Left Half (LH) battalion later went to Boshof and Right Half (RH) under Maj Jones went to Windsorton Road, Dronfield. On 4 April LH occupied Frankfort Pass while RH move to Lieuwfontein guarding the Kimberley–Boshof road.

On 12 May the battalion concentrated at Boshof, and then 300 men under Maj Jones (including the Mounted infantry (MI) section that had been formed under Capt Gunter) joined 9th Brigade of Lt-Gen Lord Methuen's 1st Division and marched to Hoopstad. Gunter's MI occupied Bloemhof, capturing much ammunition, and the Boer Commandants Wessels and Pretorius surrendered to Maj Jones. On 21 July Methuen forced Olifant's Nek, guarded by 900 Boers with two pom-pom guns, but did not have enough cavalry to prevent them escaping.

RH half battalion under Maj Jones remained in garrison at Hoopstad which was attacked on 5 September and 5 October. Food was running short and the MI went out on 2 October with empty waggons to get supplies, but could not get them back through the Boer's siege lines. A relief column arrived on 15 October, but without supplies, and the garrison was reduced from three-quarters to half rations, and then quarter rations by the end of the month, even though it was responsible for guarding 12,000 cattle. The garrison was finally relieved by Maj-Gen Bruce Hamilton on 29 December: the waggons that went out of 2 October finally got through on 4 January 1901, but by then the food had been eaten. On 1 February a 'Cossack Post' was rushed by the Boers and the MI went out but had to retire. By now the garrison was feeding the civilians as well, and it had to extend its lines 4 miles (6.4 km) out to 'Joubert's Farm' to protect the Mealie harvest. The new Commander-in-Chief, Lord Kitchener, decided that isolated posts like Hoopstad should be evacuated. On 22 March Lord Methuen tried to cross the Vaal to Hoopstad, but failed. On 1 April Brig-Gen the Earl of Errol arrived with a column and food. Next day the fortifications were destroyed and the town abandoned, the garrison going to Warrenton. The men of 3rd SWB arrived in rags, many without boots. On 20 April they were sent to Mafeking to carry out escort duties for convoys.

Since May 1900 LH battalion (under Maj Morgan after Lt-Col Henley was invalided home) had remained at Warrenton and Fourteen Streams, but on 7 March 1901 it moved out to Taungo to guard captured livestock, with 100 men detached to Christiana. The British suffered a setback at Vlakfontein in late May 1901, and in June every column in Western Transvaal was ordered to the scene. Methuen's Column operating near Zeerust included 146 men of 3rd SWB.

In late October the whole battalion was concentrated at Mafeking, mainly on escort duty. In November a detachment of 114 men including the MI section marched with Methuen to Klerksdorp. On 14 February 1902 140 men were sent to reinforce the garrison at Vryburg. However, the battalion concentrated again on 22 February and went to Cape Town, where it embarked for home on 1 March.

3rd South Wales Borderers was disembodied on 25 March 1902. During the campaign 3 officers and 34 ORs had been killed in action or died of disease. The battalion was awarded the Battle honour South Africa 1900–02 and the participants received the Queen's South Africa Medal with the clasps for 'Cape Colony' and 'Orange River Colony', and the King's South Africa Medal with the '1901' and '1902' clasps.

== Special Reserve ==
After the Boer War, there were moves to reform the Auxiliary Forces (militia, yeomanry and volunteers) to take their place in the six army corps proposed by St John Brodrick as Secretary of State for War. However, little of Brodrick's scheme was carried out. Under the sweeping Haldane Reforms of 1908, the militia was replaced by the Special Reserve (SR), a semi-professional force similar to the previous militia reserve, whose role was to provide reinforcement drafts for regular units serving overseas in wartime. The 3rd (Royal South Wales Borderers Militia) Bn, SWB, became the 3rd (Reserve) Battalion, SWB, in the SR on 5 July 1908.

== World War I ==
=== 3rd (Reserve) Battalion ===
On the outbreak of World War I the battalion was embodied at Brecon on 8 August 1914 under the command of Lt-Col S.W. Morgan. On 8 August it went to its war station at Pembroke Dock. Throughout the war it remained in the UK as a draft-finding unit. It equipped and prepared drafts of Regular Reservists, Special Reservists, and later new recruits for the regular battalions serving overseas (the 1st Bn on the Western Front, the 2nd Bn at Gallipoli and then the Western Front). The 9th (Reserve) Bn was formed alongside it at Pembroke Dock (see below).

From November 1914 to March 1915 the 3rd Bn had four trained companies under Col Morgan detached to a mobile reserve brigade at Edinburgh. In June 1915 the whole battalion went to Hightown, near Liverpool, where it remained in the Mersey defences for the rest of the war. In the autumn of 1917 Col Morgan's term of command ended and he was succeeded by Maj Maxwell-Heron.

It continued serving after the Armistice with Germany until 12 August 1919, when it was disembodied and the remaining personnel were drafted to reconstitute the 1st Bn.

=== 9th (Reserve) Battalion ===
After Lord Kitchener issued his call for volunteers in August 1914, the battalions of the 1st, 2nd and 3rd New Armies ('K1', 'K2' and 'K3' of 'Kitchener's Army') were quickly formed at the regimental depots. The SR battalions also swelled with new recruits and were soon well above their establishment strength. On 8 October 1914 each SR battalion was ordered to use the surplus to form a service battalion of the 4th New Army ('K4'). Accordingly, the 3rd (Reserve) Bn at Pembroke Dock formed the 9th (Service) Bn SWB on 31 October. Major E.S. Gillman was promoted to command the battalion on 11 November. On 1 January 1915 it joined 104th Brigade in 35th Division. On 10 April 1915 the War Office decided to convert the K4 battalions into 2nd Reserve units, providing drafts for the K1–K3 battalions in the same way that the SR was doing for the Regular battalions. The SWB battalion became 9th (Reserve) Battalion and moved to Kinmel Camp in 13th Reserve Brigade, where it trained drafts for the 4th, 5th, 6th, 7th and 8th (Service) Bns SWBs. The despatch of these drafts, beginning in July 1915, kept 9th Bn's strength low, and recruitment was slow, though the Newport Town Band joined en bloc and was employed with recruiting parties in the mining areas of Wales. When the K3 service battalions (6th, 7th and 8th) completed their mobilisation to go overseas their surplus personnel were sent to 9th Bn, which was then able to form a third company. It was reorganised as one service company of trained men ready for drafting, one of recruits, and one of men who were temporarily fit only for home service. So many young officers were sent to the battalion that on parade they formed a fourth company. The introduction of the Derby Scheme and subsequently of full conscription brought an influx of recruits to Kinmel Park, while a separate school of instruction was opened for young officers. On 1 September 1916 the 2nd Reserve battalions were transferred to the Training Reserve (TR) and the battalion was redesignated 57th Training Reserve Bn, still in 13th Reserve Bde. The training staff retained their SWB badges. It became 282nd (Infantry) Bn, TR, on 1 September 1917, and on 2 September it joined 201st Brigade in 67th Division at Patrixbourne, near Canterbury in Kent. It reverted to the SWB on 27 October when it became 52nd (Graduated) Bn. In January 1918 it was at Broadstairs, Kent, and by April 1918 it was at Foxhall Heath, near Ipswich, Suffolk, still in 67th Division. After the war ended it was converted into a service battalion on 8 February 1919 and was finally disbanded on 31 March 1920. The 52nd (Graduated) Bn was redeployed from Germany, and served in Ireland from 29 August 1919 until its disbandment in March 1920.

=== Postwar ===
The SR resumed its old title of Militia in 1921 but like most militia units the 3rd SWB remained in abeyance after World War I. By the outbreak of World War II in 1939, no officers remained listed for the battalion. The Militia was formally disbanded in April 1953.

== Commanders ==
Commanding officers of the regiment included:

Brecknockshire Militia

- Col Sir Edward Williams, 5th Baronet, appointed 29 January 1760

Monmouth & Brecon Militia

- Col Henry Somerset, 5th Duke of Beaufort, assumed command of Brecon contingent 1793
- Col Henry Somerset, 6th Duke of Beaufort, promoted 26 October 1803

Royal Brecon Militia

- Maj Cmdt Francis Chambre, promoted Lt-Col 16 October 1838
- Lt-Col Cmdt John Lloyd Vaughan Watkins, MP, appointed 16 November 1847
- Lt-Col Cmdt John Dickinson, promoted 30 August 1860
- Lt-Col Cmdt William Bridgwater promoted 25 April 1865 (joint Lt-Col Cmdt of Royal Cardigan, Brecon & Radnor until 1867)

3rd Bn South Wales Borderers

- Lt-Col William Thomas, (formerly captain in the 2nd Dragoon Guards) appointed 4 October 1876
- Lt-Col Charles Henley, promoted 6 June 1898
- Lt-Col Joseph Bailey, 2nd Baron Glanusk, DSO, (retired Regular Army major) appointed 9 April 1904
- Lt-Col Stuart Morgan, promoted 30 June 1913

=== Honorary colonels ===
The following served as Honorary Colonel of the regiment:

- Col John Lloyd Vaughan Watkins, appointed 30 August 1860 (continued with Royal Cardigan, Brecon & Radnor)
- Arthur Walsh, 2nd Baron Ormathwaite, appointed 30 December 1876, reappointed to SR 5 July 1908

== Heritage and ceremonial ==
=== Uniforms and insignia ===
When the Duke of Beaufort inspected the Brecknockshire Militia in 1684 they wore blue coats with red stockings, buff belts and white scarves, the horse troopers wearing buff coats. The company flags were green.

Red coats had become standard for the militia by 1759. After the Monmouth & Brecon Militia received its 'Royal' prefix in 1804 it was entitled to wear blue facings on the coat. In 1852 the Royal Brecknock Rifles adopted Rifle green uniforms, initially with blue facings, later black facings similar to the Rifle Brigade. The Royal Cardigan Rifles wore red or scarlet facings (similar to the 60th Rifles) and this was adopted by the combined regiment 1861–67 and by the Royal South Wales Borderers. When the regiment became 3rd Bn South Wales Borderers (SWB) in 1881 it had to abandon its rifle uniform and Royal facings to adopt the scarlet uniform and white facings of a line infantry regiment. However, in 1905 the SWB regained the traditional 'grass green' facings of the 24th Foot.

The Royal Brecknock Rifles' badge worn on the ORs' Forage cap in the 1850s was a Light Infantry bugle-horn above a scroll carrying the regiment's title. Between 1874 and 1876 the ORs' cap badge had the Prince of Wales's feathers, coronet and 'ICH DIEN' motto beneath the numeral 132 resting on a bugle-horn, the whole inside a crowned oval inscribed 'ROYAL BRECKNOCK RIFLES', surrounded by a spray of laurel. The battalion adopted the insignia of the SWB in 1881.

=== Precedence ===
In 1759 it was ordered that militia regiments on service were to take precedence from the date of their arrival in camp. In 1760 this was altered to a system of drawing lots where regiments did duty together. During the War of American Independence the order of precedence of county militia regiments was determined by an annual ballot. However, units such as the Brecknock Militia that did not constitute a full battalion were not included. The order balloted for at the start of the French Revolutionary War in 1793 remained in force throughout the war: the Monmouth & Brecon was allotted 14th place. Another ballot for precedence took place in 1803 at the start of the Napoleonic War and remained in force until 1833: the Monmouth & Brecon was 18th. In 1833 the King drew the lots for individual regiments, but this did not recognise that the Monmouth & Brecon had been separated: both regiments used the precedence of 31st. The order was revised in 1855, when Monmouth kept 31st and the Royal Brecon received 132nd. The Royal Cardigan, Brecon & Radnor took the Cardigans' ranking of 64th; the Royal Brecon resumed 132nd after the split in 1867. Most militia regiments paid little attention to the numeral, but in the 1870s the Royal Brecknock Rifles incorporated it into the cap badge.

== See also ==
- Trained Bands
- Militia (English)
- Militia (Great Britain)
- Militia (United Kingdom)
- South Wales Borderers
- Monmouthshire Militia
