= Royal Flint Rifles =

Auxiliary unit of the British Army

Flintshire Militia Royal Flint Rifles 6th Battalion, King's Royal Rifle Corps
- Active: 1662–30 June 1889
- Country: England (1662–1707); Kingdom of Great Britain (1707–1800); United Kingdom (1801–1889)
- Branch: Militia
- Role: Infantry
- Size: 1 Battalion
- Garrison/HQ: Mold, Flintshire; Holywell, Flintshire
- Mottos: 'Fyddlawn a pharod' ('Faithful and prepared')

The Flintshire Militia, later the Royal Flint Rifles was an auxiliary (Note: It is incorrect to describe the British Militia as 'irregular': throughout their history they were equipped and trained exactly like the line regiments of the regular army, and once embodied in time of war they were fulltime professional soldiers for the duration of their enlistment.) regiment reorganised in the Welsh county of Flintshire during the 18th century from earlier precursor units. Primarily intended for home defence, it served in all of Britain's major wars, and supplied many recruits to the Regular Army. After a short-lived merger with another Welsh militia regiment it became a battalion of the King's Royal Rifle Corps but was disbanded in 1889.

== Flint Trained Bands ==
The universal obligation to military service in the Shire levy was long established in England and extended to Wales. King Henry VIII called a 'Great Muster' in 1539, and returns showed 2372 men available for service from Flintshire. The legal basis of the militia was updated by two acts of 1557 (4 & 5 Ph. & M. cc. 2 and 3), which placed selected men, the 'trained bands', under the command of county Lords Lieutenant appointed by the monarch. This is seen as the starting date for the organised Militia of England and Wales.

Although the militia obligation was universal, it was clearly impractical to train and equip every able-bodied man, so after 1572 the practice was to select a proportion of men for the Trained Bands, who were mustered for regular training. During the Armada crisis of 1588, Flintshire furnished 200 trained foot and 100 untrained 'pioneers', together with 30 horsemen (heavy lancers, light horse and 'petronel's (the petronel was an early cavalry firearm)).

In the 16th century little distinction was made between the militia and the troops levied by the counties for overseas expeditions. However, the counties usually conscripted the unemployed and criminals rather than the Trained Bandsmen. Between 1585 and 1602 Flintshire supplied 765 men for service in Ireland, and a further 75 for France. The men were given three days' 'conduct money' to get to Chester, the main port of embarkation for Ireland. Conduct money was recovered from the government, but replacing the weapons issued to the levies from the militia armouries was a heavy cost on the counties.

With the passing of the threat of invasion, the trained bands declined in the early 17th century. Later, King Charles I attempted to reform them into a national force or 'Perfect Militia' answering to the king rather than local control. In 1638 the Flint Trained Bands consisted of 200 men of whom 140 were armed with muskets and 60 were 'corslets' (body armour, signifying pikemen), with 30 men in the Flint Trained Band Horse. In 1640 the county was ordered to send a detachment of 80 men to Newcastle upon Tyne to take part in the Second Bishops' War.

=== Civil War ===
Control of the militia was one of the areas of dispute between Charles I and Parliament that led to the English Civil War. When open was broke out between the King and Parliament, neither side made much use of the trained bands beyond securing the county armouries for their own full-time troops. Most of Wales was under Royalist control for much of the war, and was a recruiting ground for the King's armies. In August 1642 Colonel Sir Thomas Salusbury, 2nd Baronet of Lleweni, raised a Royalist foot regiment mainly from Denbighshire and Flintshire, which served throughout the war from the Battle of Edgehill until the final surrender in 1646.

Colonel Roger Mostyn raised another regiment of 1500 men, apparently from the Flintshire Trained Bands, in just 12 hours, and marched his recruits to Chester in January 1643. The regiment was at the successful siege of Hawarden Castle in November–December 1643. Later it was in the Siege of Chester from January 1645 including the Battle of Rowton Heath in September 1645 and a skirmish at Ruthin in January 1646. The regiment was down to 300 men by April 1645 but Mostyn reinforced his regiment up to strength with 160 recruits shipped into Chester from Ireland in January 1646. Chester surrendered in February 1646 and the regiment was besieged in Flint Castle from May to August, and at the siege of Denbigh Castle until its finally surrender on 14 October.

In July 1643 Lieutenant-Colonel Thomas Davies of Gwysaney was promoted to colonel in Denbighshire and Flintshire under Lord Capel and was commissioned to raise a further regiment of 500 foot and Dragoons, apparently from the Flintshire Trained Bands. It served alongside Mostyn's at Flint and Hawarden in 1643, garrisoned Denbigh Castle in 1645, possibly including the Battle of Denbigh Green, and was there at the final surrender.

== Flintshire Militia ==
After the Restoration of the Monarchy, the Militia was re-established by the Militia Act 1661 under the control of the king's lords lieutenant, the men to be selected by ballot. This was popularly seen as the 'Constitutional Force' to counterbalance a 'Standing Army' tainted by association with the New Model Army that had supported Cromwell's military dictatorship.

The militia forces in the Welsh counties were small, and were grouped together under the command of the Lord President of the Council of Wales. As Lord President, the Duke of Beaufort carried out a tour of inspection of the Welsh militia in 1684, when the Flintshire contingent consisted of one troop of horse and five foot companies commanded by Sir Roger Mostyn, who had been created 1st Baronet of Mostyn Hall at the Restoration. In 1697 it consisted of 250 foot under Col Sir Roger Puleston of Emral and 25 horse under Capt Owen Barton.

Generally the militia declined in the long peace after the Treaty of Utrecht in 1713. Jacobites were numerous amongst the Welsh Militia, but they did not show their hands during the Risings of 1715 and 1745, and bloodshed was avoided.

== 1757 reforms ==
Under threat of French invasion during the Seven Years' War a series of Militia Acts from 1757 re-established county militia regiments, the men being conscripted by means of parish ballots (paid substitutes were permitted) to serve for three years. There was a property qualification for officers, who were commissioned by the lord lieutenant. An adjutant and drill sergeants were to be provided to each regiment from the Regular Army, and arms and accoutrements would be supplied when the county had secured 60 per cent of its quota of recruits.

Flintshire was given a quota of 120 men to raise, but recruitment throughout Wales was slow. Major-General the Earl of Cholmondeley was Lord Lieutenant of Flintshire and several other Welsh counties, but found that the only one able to fulfil its quota was tiny Flintshire. The problem was less with the other ranks raised by ballot than the shortage of men qualified to be officers, even after the requirements were lowered for Welsh counties. The Flintshire Militia was raised on 3 October 1759 at Mold under the command of Sir Roger Mostyn, 5th Baronet, Member of Parliament for Flintshire (who replaced Cholmondeley as lord lieutenant the following year). The arms, equipment and regimental colours arrived at Holywell on 3 December, and the regiment was embodied for fulltime service on 8 December 1759.

The regiment completed its embodiment on 12 December and was ordered to Carmarthen, marching via Wrexham and Llandrindod (where it was snowbound) before reaching to town at the end of the month. After some weeks of duty at Carmarthen, the regiment was ordered into the Welsh borders. By July 1760 it was at Bridgnorth in Shropshire where it remained until March 1761 when it marched back to Holywell. In midsummer 1762 the regiment was on duty in Liverpool until 19 August when it marched back to Holywell. The Seven Years War ended on 20 December and the Flintshire Militia was disembodied shortly afterwards.

In peacetime the adjutant, sergeants and drummers of the disembodied regiment maintained the militia store and armoury in Holywell. Training was sporadic, but the numbers were maintained by periodic enforcement of the ballot. Major Robert Hughes of Halkyn Hall became commanding officer in 1775, though Sir Roger Mostyn remained lord lieutenant.

=== War of American Independence ===
The militia were called out on 26 March 1778 during the War of American Independence, when the country was threatened with invasion by the Americans' allies, France and Spain. The Flintshires assembled under Maj Hughes at Holywell, but after a few weeks were marched away from the county to remove the temptation for the men to stray home. On 2 May the regiment set out for Whitchurch, Shropshire, moving on to Chester on 10 June, but on 16 July Hughes was ordered to march the regiment back to Flintshire, where the men were billeted at Hiolwell, Mold and other places for the rest of the year.

On 6 February 1779 the regiment was sent to Warrington in Cheshire, where a strike among sailcloth makers threatened civil disorder. By May the regiment formed part of the Chester garrison with a detachment at Nantwich. Then on 7 June it moved to Cumberland, where its companies took up duties in Cockermouth, Workington and Maryport. They remained there until 8 April 1780 when they concentrated at Whitehaven and then marched back to Wales, first at Oswestry, then into Pembrokeshire where it took up duties at Pembroke Dock and Haverfordwest. Here its duties included guarding the Royal Navy establishments and the prisoners of war, and manning the Milford Haven defences and the battery at Fishguard. They stayed here until the end of the war in January 1783. By March the regiment was back at Mold and Hawarden to be disembodied.

From 1784 to 1792 the militia were assembled for their 28 days' annual peacetime training, but to save money only two-thirds of the men were actually mustered each year.

=== French Revolutionary and Napoleonic Wars ===
Revolutionary France declared war on Britain on 1 February 1793. Orders to embody the Flintshire Militia were issued next day and it assembled at Holywell. On 13 March it was sent to join the garrison at Woolwich, but was quartered in Hertfordshire until July when it completed its march. On 12 September the regiment marched to Hampshire where it took up duties in the defences of the naval base at Portsmouth.

The French Revolutionary War and Napoleonic Wars saw a new phase for the English militia: they were embodied for a whole generation, and became regiments of full-time professional soldiers (though restricted to service in the British Isles), which the regular army increasingly saw as a prime source of recruits. They served in coast defences, manning garrisons, guarding prisoners of war, and for internal security, while their traditional local defence duties were taken over by the Volunteers and mounted Yeomanry.

The regiment raised an additional company of volunteers attracted by a bounty paid for by patriotic subscriptions in the county, and it marched from Holywell to join the regiment in August 1794. On 1 December 1794 the regiment left Portsmouth and went into winter quarters at Littlehampton and Chichester in Sussex. On 28 April 1795 the regiment deployed along the Kent coast between Lydd and New Romney, then from 3 July moved into the garrison of Dover, with a detachment at Hythe. In October 1796 the Flintshires moved to the forts around Deal.

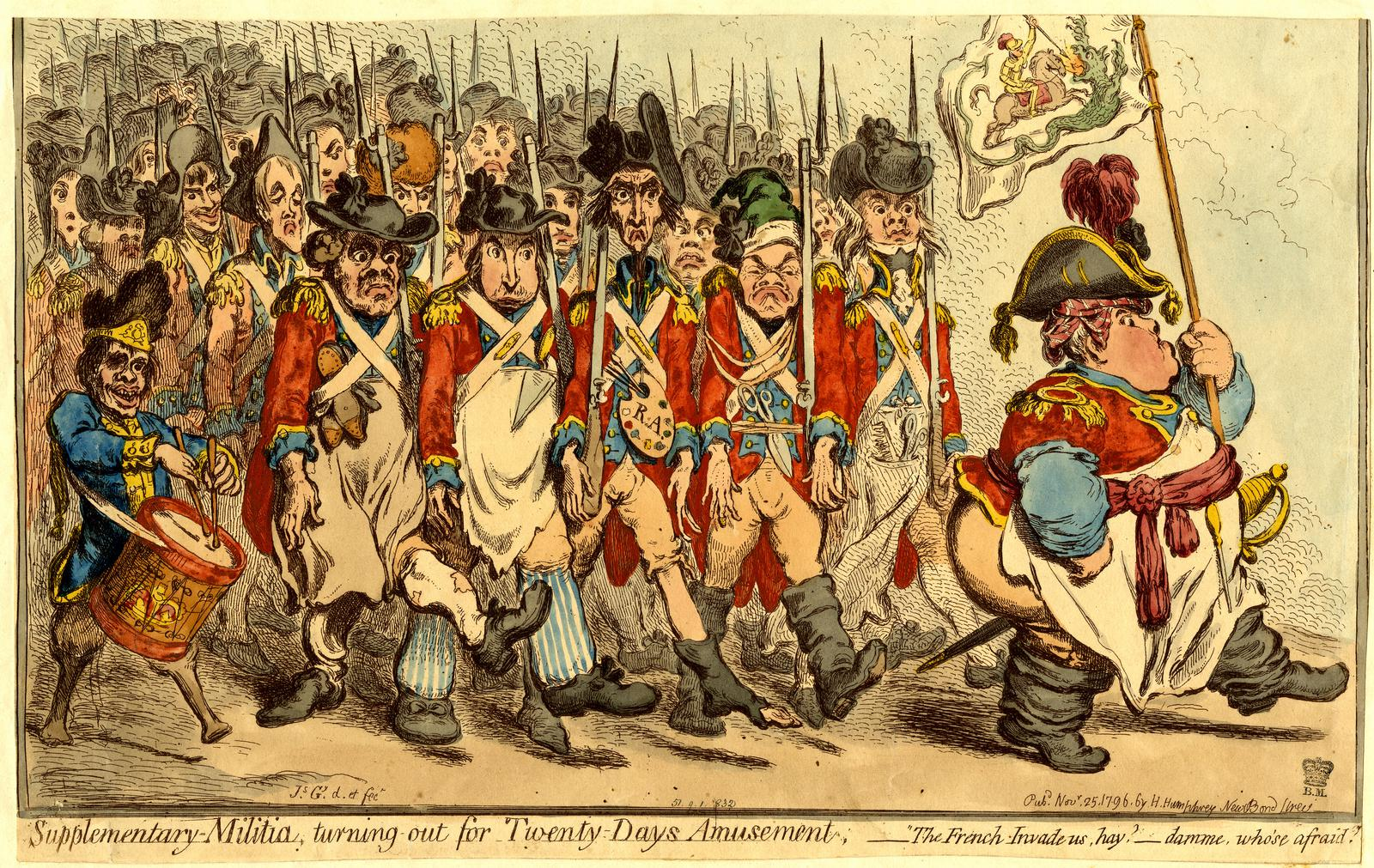
Supplementary-Militia, turning-out for Twenty Days Amusement: 1796 caricature by James Gillray

In a fresh attempt to have as many men as possible under arms for home defence in order to release regulars, the Government created the Supplementary Militia, a compulsory levy of men to be trained in their spare time, and to be incorporated in the Regular Militia as required. Flintshire's regimental quota was brought up to 311 and after 20 days' training at Holywell the additional supplementaries marched off to join the regiment.

In September 1797 the Flintshires were in barracks at Sheerness for the winter, then moved out to Hythe in March 1798 and back into the Deal forts in May. At the end of June the regiment marched into Hampshire, first to Christchurch, then into the Portsmouth and Gosport defences until June 1799. That month it crossed to the Isle of Wight. The regiment's establishment was raised to 377 men, and the additional recruits joined it there after training. The Flintshires moved back to Lymington on the mainland in February 1800, then were stationed at Winchester between April and November. They returned to Lymington for the winter. By the summer of 1801 the regiment was much reduced by the release of some supplementaries and men leaving to volunteer for the regulars. In August it moved back to the Portsmouth area until November, when it marched back to Whitchurch while peace negotiations were continuing.

The Treaty of Amiens was signed on 25 March and most of the militia was immediately stood down. The Flintshires marched back to be disembodied at Holywell in April. The disembodied regimental strength was set at 240 men, and was kept up by use of the ballot. However, the Peace of Amiens was short-lived and the regiment was embodied once more at Mold in April 1803 ahead of the resumption of the war in May. The regiment returned to the Portsmouth defences, with a detachment serving as gunners in the Isle of Wight forts. In May 1804 the regiment marched out of Fort Cumberland to Hythe, where a draft of newly balloted men joined. The Isle of Wight detachment rejoined in July.

In April 1804 the regiment was one of 12 Welsh militia regiments awarded the prefix 'Royal'. Then in March 1806 it was converted to Light infantry, becoming the Royal Flint Light Infantry Militia. Apart from the title, the changes to dress and weaponry were minor, the drums being replaced by bugles and the sergeants' halberds by fusils (light muskets). (Note: Two normally reliable sources suggests that the regiment took the title 'Royal Flint Fuzileers Militia' in 1805, but the 1805 Militia and Volunteers List shows that the Royal Flint Militia and the Flint Fuzileers Volunteers were separate units.)

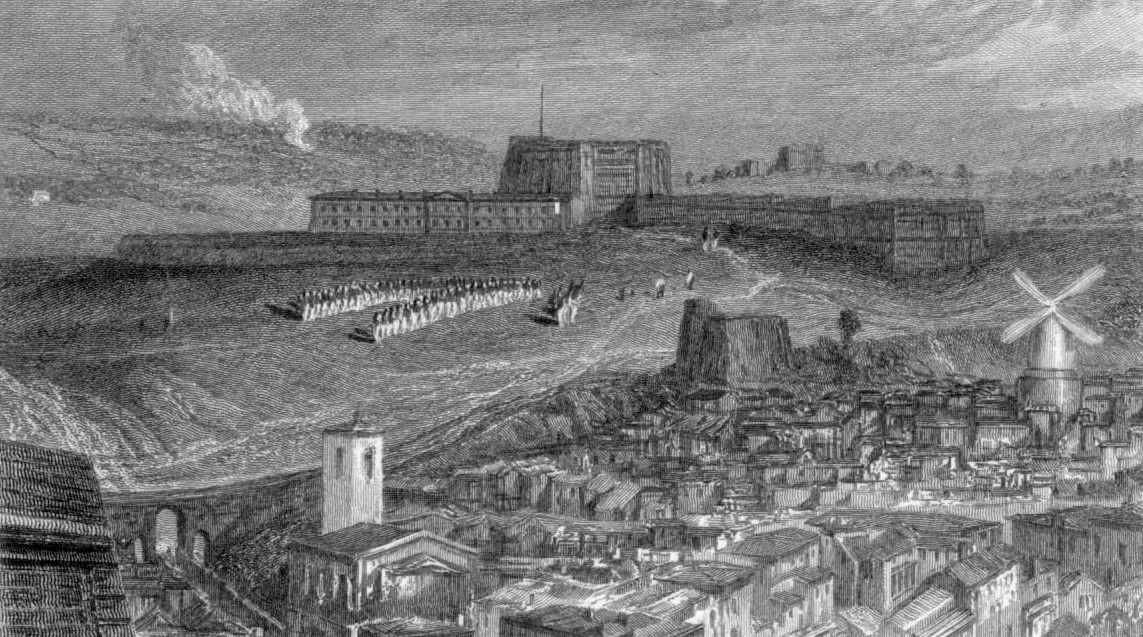
Fort Pitt, Chatham, seen from Fort Amherst

From June 1804 to March 1805 the Royal Flint LI were quartered at Woolwich, with detachments at the newly built Fort Pitt, Chatham, and at the military depot at Canterbury. From March 1805 to March 1806 it was at the Hythe forts on the Kent Coast: during the summer of 1805, when Napoleon was massing his 'Army of England' at Boulogne for a projected invasion, the regiment under Lt-Col Thomas Hanmer was stationed at Fort Twiss, with 219 men in 4 companies, forming part of Maj-Gen Sir John Moore's force. Afterwards it was at Dungeness until March 1807, then at Fort Pitt until March 1808. It was then at Shorncliffe Camp until September, and Hythe until December. In March 1809 it moved to Bexhill-on-Sea, where together with the Royal Merionethshire Light Infantry and the Royal Pembroke Light Infantry it formed a Welsh Brigade. The Royal Flint LI and several other Welsh militia regiments volunteered to serve as complete regiments in the Peninsular War, but the offer was declined. However, large numbers of individuals transferred to the regulars, and the militia were allowed to send parties home to recruit volunteer replacements 'by beat of drum'. In 1812 the Royal Flint LI were converted to Rifles, adopting the green uniforms and Baker rifle of the regular rifle units.

After the Welsh Brigade was broken up in December 1809 the Royal Flint went to Hastings until September 1810, then to Eastbourne, and back to Bexhill in December. In March 1811 they moved to the military dept at Weedon in Northamptonshire and then in November went back to Woolwich, where they remained for the rest of the war. The regiment returned to Mold on 27 May 1814 to be disembodied.

Napoleon's return to France in 1815 led to another war and the Royal Flint Rifles were embodied once more in June. The intention had been to send it to Ireland to release regulars for the war, but the Battle of Waterloo brought a swift end to hostilities. Instead the regiment joined the Chester garrison until December, after which it returned to Mold where it was disembodied in March–April 1816.

After Waterloo there was another long peace. Although officers continued to be commissioned into the militia and ballots were still held, the regiments were rarely assembled for training (the Flints only trained in 1821, 1825 and 1831, and then not again for 21 years) and the permanent staffs of sergeants and drummers were progressively reduced. Other than those of the permanent staff, who supported the parish constables, all weapons were returned to store at Chester Castle.

== 1852 reforms ==
The Militia of the United Kingdom was revived by the Militia Act 1852, enacted during a period of international tension. As before, units were raised and administered on a county basis, and filled by voluntary enlistment (although conscription by means of the militia ballot might be used if the counties failed to meet their quotas). Training was for 56 days on enlistment, then for 21–28 days per year, during which the men received full army pay. Under the Act, militia units could be embodied by Royal Proclamation for full-time service in three circumstances:

1. 'Whenever a state of war exists between Her Majesty and any foreign power'.
2. 'In all cases of invasion or upon imminent danger thereof'.
3. 'In all cases of rebellion or insurrection'.

The Royal Flint Rifles were recruited up to strength and called out for 28 days' training in 1852 under the command of Sir Richard Puleston, 2nd Baronet, of Emral Park, who had been in command since 24 February 1846.

=== Crimean War and after ===
War having broken out with Russia in 1854 and an expeditionary force sent to the Crimea, the militia began to be called out for home defence. However, it appears that the Royal Flint Rifles were only embodied for an extended training period at Mold, and did not carry out any garrison duties. A number of men volunteered to transfer to the regulars.

The construction of a new Militia Armoury at Mold was announced in 1855, and this was completed in 1857–8, located to the rear of the old County Hall in Chester Street. After the disbandment of the regiment it was converted into county offices in 1897–8 and demolished when the new Shirehall was built in the late 1960s.

In 1861 the War Office ordered the amalgamation of the Flintshire and Denbighshire militia quotas to form a larger regiment. The Royal Flint Rifles were officially merged with the Royal Denbigh Rifles at Wrexham to form the Royal Denbigh & Flint Rifles. However, the two contingents continued to operate separately and the merger was rescinded in 1867 when the regiments reverted to their previous titles.

The Militia Reserve introduced in 1867 consisted of present and former militiamen who undertook to serve overseas in case of war. From 1871 The militia came under the War Office rather than their county lords lieutenant and by now the battalions had a large cadre of permanent staff (about 30). Around a third of the recruits and many young officers went on to join the regular army.

== Cardwell Reforms ==
Under the 'Localisation of the Forces' scheme introduced by the Cardwell Reforms of 1872, the militia were brigaded with their local regular and volunteer battalions on 1 April 1873. For the Royal Flint Rifles this was in No 23 Brigade Sub-District covering the militia of the five northern counties of Wales (Anglesey, Carnarvon, Denbigh, Flint and Merioneth), grouped with the 23rd (Royal Welch Fusiliers) and the Denbigh and Flint rifle volunteers.

Following the Cardwell Reforms a mobilisation scheme began to appear in the Army List from December 1875. This assigned Regular and Militia units to places in an order of battle of corps, divisions and brigades for the 'Active Army', even though these formations were entirely theoretical, with no staff or services assigned. The Royal Flint Rifles were initially assigned as 'Divisional Troops' to 3rd Division, VI Corps. The division would have mustered at Manchester in time of war.

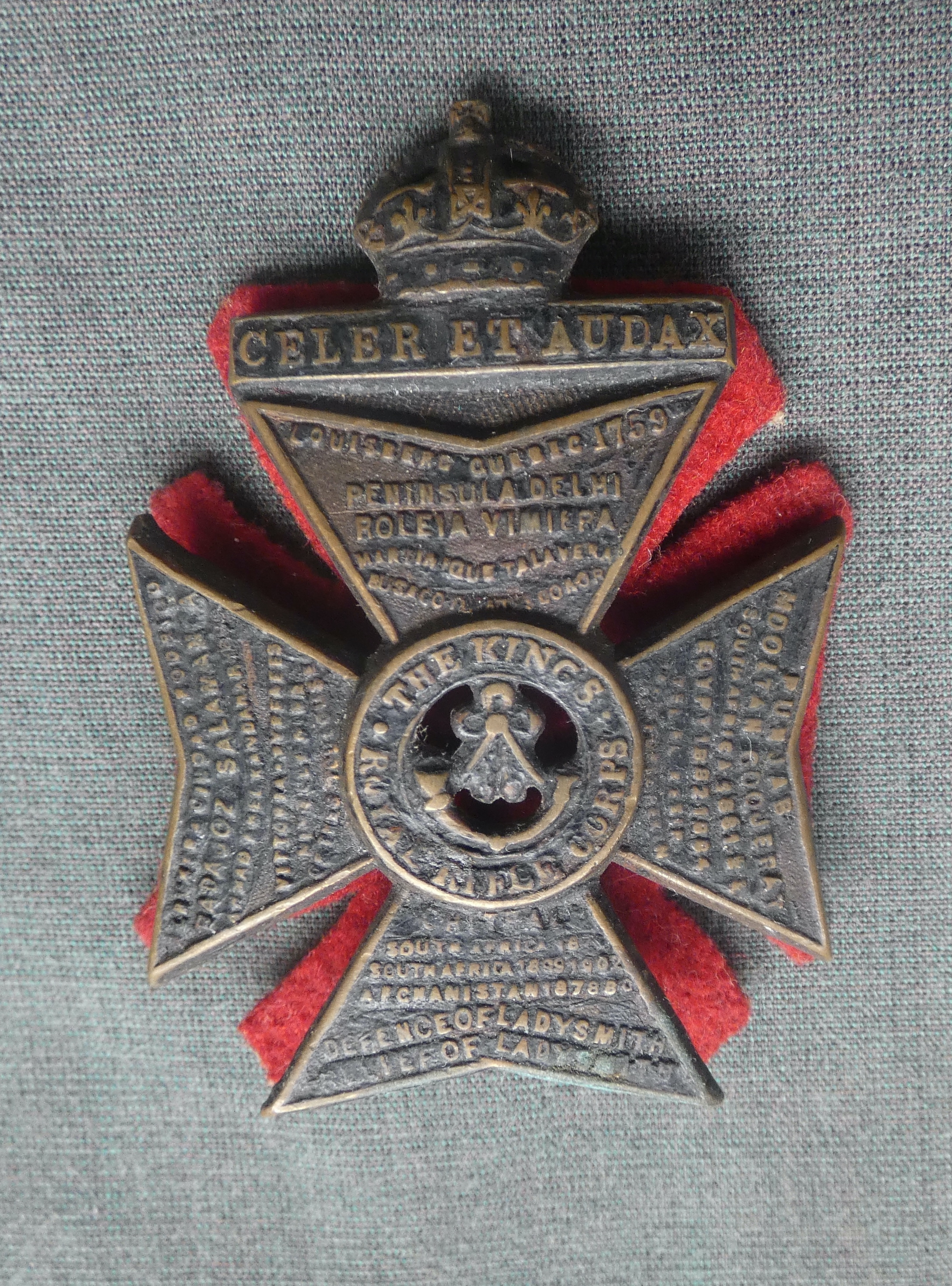
Cap badge of the King's Royal Rifle Corps

== 6th Battalion, King's Royal Rifle Corps ==
The Childers Reforms of 1881 took Cardwell's reforms further, with the militia formally joining their linked regiments. The Royal Anglesey Militia had already been converted to Royal Engineers, and the Carnarvon, Denbigh and Merioneth joined the Royal Welch Fusiliers, ceasing to be rifle regiments, but the Royal Flint Rifles instead joined the King's Royal Rifle Corps (KRRC), becoming its 6th Battalion.

However, the battalion remained too small to be viable and it remained based at Mold, rather than joining the Rifles Depot at Winchester. For its annual training in May 1889 there were only 245 all ranks, and the battalion wasI was disbanded the following month.

This ended the formal history of the militia in Flintshire, but after the battalion's disbandment the Army List shows that the 3rd (Royal Denbigh & Merioneth Militia) Battalion of the Royal Welch Fusiliers changed its subtitle, becoming the 3rd (Royal Denbigh & Flint Militia) Battalion.

== Commanders ==
The following commanded the regiment:

- Col Sir Roger Puleston of Emral Park, 1697
- Lt-Col Sir Roger Mostyn, 5th Baronet, 3 October 1759
- Maj Robert Hughes of Halkyn Hall, 23 January 1775
- Col Earl Grosvenor, 13 August 1798
- Lt-Col Thomas Hanmer of Bettisfield, 21 April 1805
- Lt-Col Philip Lloyd Fletcher, 6 April 1809
- Col Sir Richard Puleston, 2nd Baronet, of Emral Park, 24 February 1846
- Col Hon Richard Thomas Rowley, MP, formerly Captain, Scots Fusilier Guards, promoted 14 May 1855 (joint colonel of the Royal Denbigh & Flint Rifles 1861–67)
- Lt-Col Robert Willis, promoted 13 March 1866
- Lt-Col Charles J.T. Roper, promoted 27 November 1880

Honorary Colonel

- Hon Sir Richard Rowley, former CO, appointed 13 March 1866

== Heritage and ceremonial ==
=== Uniforms and insignia ===
The uniform was similar to that of the regular infantry of the line, with green facings on the red coat from 1759 to about 1763. Probably by 1778 and certainly from 1780 the facings were blue. On conversion to rifles the uniform changed to rifle green with black facings (similar to the 95th Rifles). The amalgamated Royal Denbigh & Flint Rifles wore blue facings, but on regaining its independence in 1876 the Royal Flint Rifles adopted red facings, similar to the KRRC.

The officers' gilt shoulder-belt plate ca 1800 had a silver design of the Prince of Wales's feathers, coronet and motto Ich Dien above the initials 'RFM'. The officers' shako plate ca 1830 consisted of the feathers, coronet and motto superimposed on a rayed star surmounted by a crown, a scroll beneath inscribed 'ROYAL FLINT'. The Royal Flint Rifles' black button ca 1855 carried a stringed bugle-horn surmounted by the feathers and coronet, set within a circle carrying the title 'ROYAL FLINT', while the cap badge of the same period was in two parts, with a bugle horn over a scroll with the 'ROYAL FINT', title. After 1867 the officers' pouchbelt plate bore a silver Maltese cross surmounted by a crown, with the feathers, coronet and motto within a wreath superimposed over it; the title 'FLINTSHIRE' was on the upper limb of the cross, 'RIFLE CORPS' on the lower, which also had a bugle-horn beneath it. The badge on the other ranks' Glengarry cap ca 1877 consisted of the feathers, coronet and motto within an oval scroll inscribed 'ROYAL FLINT MILITIA', with a decorative scroll beneath inscribed 'FYDDLAWN A PHAROD' ('Faithful and prepared'). In 1881 the regiment adopted the uniform and insignia of the KRRC.

The regimental colour issued in 1759 was green with the coat of arms of the lord lieutenant on it. When the regiment was embodied again in 1778 this was probably changed to blue to match the facings. A fresh colour issued about 1804 included the Union Flag in the canton and a design in the centre that included the designation 'ROYAL FLINT MILITIA'. The regiment ceased to carry after it was converted to rifles in 1812.

=== Precedence ===
In 1760 a system of drawing lots was introduced to determine the relative precedence of militia regiments serving together. During the War of American Independence the counties were given an order of precedence determined by ballot each year. However the Flintshire Militia did not constitute a full regiment and was not awarded a position. When the Napoleonic War began in 1803 the Flintshire were balloted as 19th, and this list remained in force until 1833. In that year the King drew the lots and the resulting list remained in force with minor amendments until the end of the militia. The regiments raised before the peace of 1763 took the first places and the Flintshire was awarded 32nd place. The regimental number was only a subsidiary title and most regiments paid little attention to it.

== See also ==
- Trained Bands
- Militia (English)
- Militia (Great Britain)
- Militia (United Kingdom)
- King's Royal Rifle Corps
