= Welsh Division, Royal Artillery =

Welsh Division, RA
- Cap Badge of the Royal Regiment of Artillery
- Active: 4 April 1882–1 July 1889
- Country: United Kingdom
- Branch: British Army
- Type: Administrative division
- Part of: Royal Artillery
- Garrison/HQ: Pembroke Dock

The Welsh Division, Royal Artillery, was an administrative grouping of garrison units of the Royal Artillery, Artillery Militia and Artillery Volunteers in the British Army's Western District from 1882 to 1889.

== Organisation ==
Under General Order 72 of 4 April 1882 the Royal Artillery (RA) broke up its existing administrative brigades (Note: In RA terminology, a 'brigade' was a group of independent batteries grouped together for administrative rather than tactical purposes, the officer in command being usually a lieutenant-colonel rather than a brigadier-general or major-general, the ranks usually associated with command of an infantry or cavalry brigade.) of garrison artillery (7th–11th Brigades, RA) and assigned the individual batteries to 11 new territorial divisions. These divisions were purely administrative and recruiting organisations, not field formations. Most were formed within the existing military districts into which the United Kingdom was divided, and for the first time associated the part-time Artillery Militia with the regulars. Shortly afterwards the Artillery Volunteers were also added to the territorial divisions. The Regular Army batteries were grouped into one brigade, usually of nine sequentially-numbered batteries and a depot battery. For t these units the divisions represented recruiting districts – batteries could be serving anywhere in the British Empire and their only connection to brigade headquarters (HQ) was for the supply of drafts and recruits. The artillery militia units (sometimes referred to as regiments) already comprised a number of batteries, and were redesignated as brigades, losing their county titles in the process. The artillery volunteers, which had previously consisted of numerous independent Artillery Volunteer Corps (AVC) of various sizes, sometimes grouped into administrative brigades, had been consolidated into larger AVCs in 1881, which were now affiliated to the appropriate territorial division.

== Composition ==
Welsh Division, RA, listed as ninth in order of precedence, was organised in Western District with the following composition:

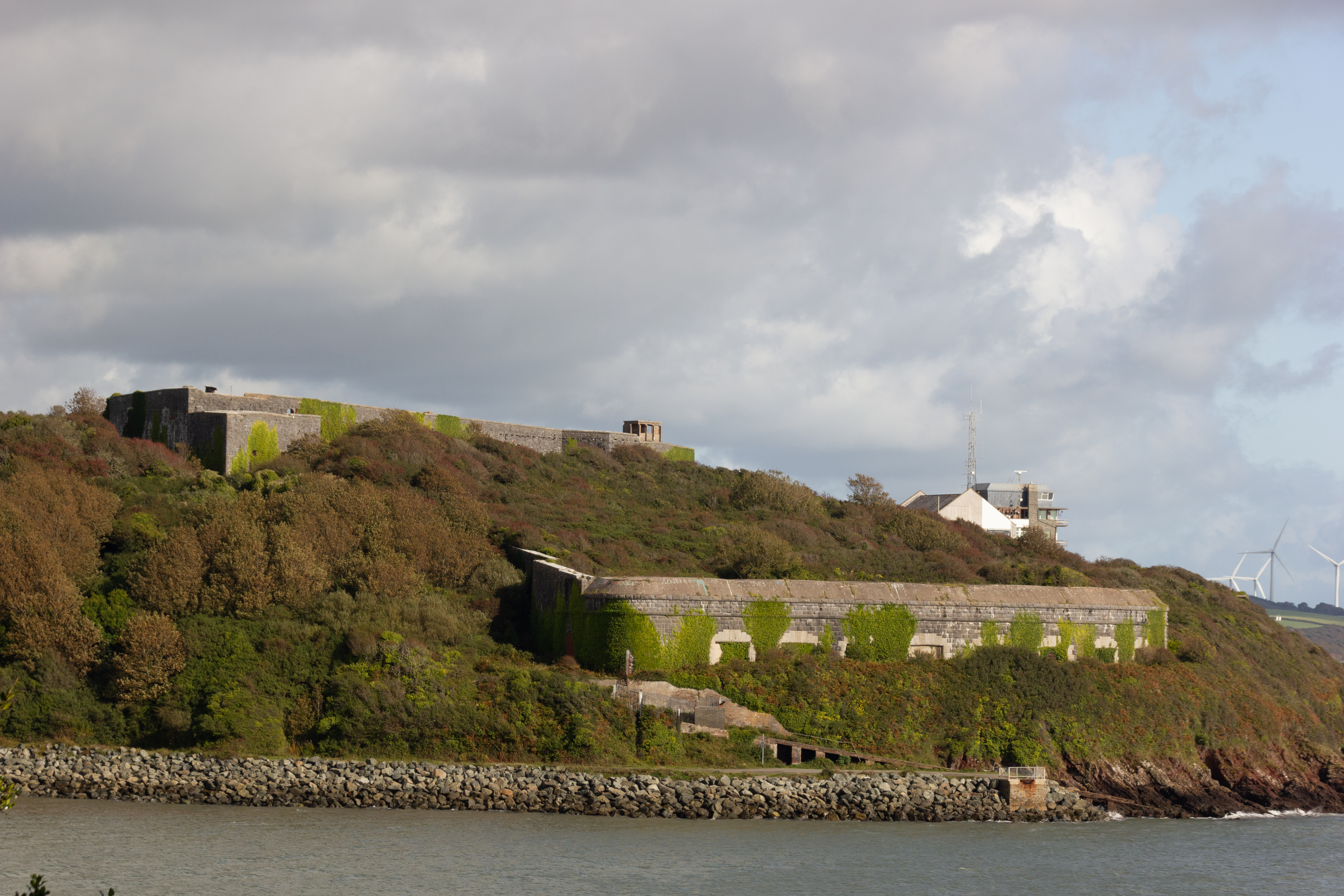
Fort Hubberstone, part of the defences of Pembroke Dock.

- Headquarters (HQ) at Pembroke Dock
- 1st Brigade
  - HQ at Newport
  - 1st Bty at Pembroke Dock – formerly 9th Bty, 8th Bde
  - 2nd Bty at Hubberston – formerly 12nd Bty, 9th Bde
  - 3rd Bty at Pembroke Dock – formerly 19th Bty, 11th Bde
  - 4th Bty at Secunderabad – formerly 4th Bty, 8th Bde
  - 5th Bty at St Thomas's Mount – formerly 7th Bty, 8th Bde
  - 6th Bty at Halifax, Nova Scotia – formerly 2nd Bty, 10th Bde
  - 7th Bty at Halifax – formerly 17th Bty, 9th Bde
  - 8th Bty at Halifax – formerly 18th Bty, 9th Bde
  - 9th Bty – new Bty formed 1885
  - Depot Bty at Newport – formerly Depot Bty, 11th Bde
- 2nd Brigade at Swansea – formerly Royal Glamorgan Artillery Militia (4 btys)
- 3rd Brigade at Carmarthen – formerly Royal Carmarthen Artillery Militia (6 btys)
- 4th Brigade at Haverfordwest – formerly Royal Pembroke Artillery Militia (5 btys)
- 5th Brigade at Aberystwyth – formerly Royal Cardigan Artillery Militia (4 btys)
- 1st Glamorganshire Artillery Volunteers at Cardiff
- 1st Gloucestershire Artillery Volunteers at Bristol
- 1st Pembrokeshire Artillery Volunteers at Pembroke Dock
- 1st Worcestershire Artillery Volunteers at Worcester

== Disbandment ==
On 1 July 1889 the garrison artillery was reorganised again into three large territorial divisions of garrison artillery (Eastern, Southern and Western) and one of mountain artillery. The assignment of units to them seemed geographically arbitrary, with the Welsh units being divided between the Southern and Western Divisions. The regular batteries were distributed across most of the divisions and completely renumbered.

== See also ==
- Royal Garrison Artillery
- List of Royal Artillery Divisions 1882–1902
- Eastern Division, Royal Artillery
- Southern Division, Royal Artillery
- Western Division, Royal Artillery
