= Royal Pembroke Militia =

Auxiliary unit of the British Army

Pembrokeshire Militia Royal Pembroke Rifles Royal Pembroke Artillery
- Active: 1661–16 March 1909
- Country: England (1661–1707); Kingdom of Great Britain (1707–1800); United Kingdom (1801–1909)
- Branch: Militia
- Role: Infantry; Garrison Artillery
- Size: Regiment
- Garrison/HQ: Haverfordwest; Fort Hubberstone, Milford Haven (from 1885)

The Pembrokeshire Militia, later the Royal Pembroke Rifles, was an auxiliary (Note: It is incorrect to describe the British Militia as 'irregular': throughout their history they were equipped and trained exactly like the line regiments of the regular army, and once embodied in time of war they were fulltime professional soldiers for the duration of their enlistment.) regiment reorganised from earlier precursor units in the Welsh county of Pembrokeshire during the 18th Century. Primarily intended for home defence, it served in Britain and Ireland through all Britain's major wars. It was converted into garrison artillery in 1853 and continued until it was disbanded in 1909.

== Pembroke Trained Bands ==
The universal obligation to military service in the Shire levy was long established in England and was extended to Wales. King Henry VIII called a 'Great Muster' in 1539, which showed the following available in the newly reorganised county of Pembrokeshire:

- County of Pembrokeshire: 1166 men available for service, of whom 139 had 'harness' (armour)
- Lordship of Haverfordwest: 454 (43 with harness)
- Tenants of Thomas Jones in both those places and in the Hundred of Dewisland: 380 with 4 'nags' (horses)
- Cilgerran Hundred: 254

The legal basis of the militia was updated by two acts of 1557 covering musters (4 & 5 Ph. & M. c. 3) and the maintenance of horses and armour (4 & 5 Ph. & M. c. 2). The county militia was now under the Lord Lieutenant, assisted by the Deputy Lieutenants and Justices of the Peace (JPs). The entry into force of these Acts in 1558 is seen as the starting date for the organised Militia of England and Wales. Although the militia obligation was universal, it was clearly impractical to train and equip every able-bodied man, so after 1572 the practice was to select a proportion of men for the Trained Bands, who were mustered for regular training. During the Armada crisis of 1588 Pembrokeshire furnished 800 trained foot and 30 'petronel's (the petronel was an early cavalry firearm).

In the 16th Century little distinction was made between the militia and the troops levied by the counties for overseas expeditions. However, the counties usually conscripted the unemployed and criminals rather than send the trained bandsmen. Between 1585 and 1602 Pembrokeshire supplied 610 men for service in Ireland and 30 for the Netherlands. The levies were commanded by professional captains rather than local men: in 1601 a captain who had raised 100 troops in Gloucestershire was ordered to take the 50 from Pembrokeshire under his command as well. The men were given 'conduct money' to get to the embarkation ports. This was recovered from the government, but replacing the weapons issued to the levies from the militia armouries was a heavy cost on the counties.

With the passing of the threat of invasion, the trained bands declined in the early 17th Century. Later, King Charles I attempted to reform them into a national force or 'Perfect Militia' answering to the king rather than local control. The Pembrokeshire Trained Bands of 1638 consisted of 557 men, 276 armed with muskets and 281 'Corslets' (body armour, signifying pikemen). They also mustered 57 horse. Part of this force may have been organised as the North Pembroke Trained Band. Pembrokeshire was ordered to send 300 men overland to Newcastle upon Tyne for the Second Bishops' War of 1640. However, substitution was rife and many of those sent on this unpopular service would have been untrained replacements.

=== Civil Wars ===
Control of the militia was one of the areas of dispute between Charles I and Parliament that led to the English Civil War. When open war broke out between the King and Parliament, neither side made much use of the trained bands beyond securing the county armouries for their own full-time troops. Most of Wales was under Royalist control for much of the war, and was a recruiting ground for the King's armies. However, Pembrokeshire was divided, with the coastal towns of Pembroke and Tenby leaning towards Parliament. These were vital for the Royal army to land supplies and reinforcements from Ireland. On 18 September 1643 during his campaign to take these two towns, the Earl of Carbery as the King's Lieutenant-General for Carmarthenshire, Cardiganshire and Pembrokeshire, summoned the Pembrokeshire TBs to Haverfordwest, where they declared for the King and were presumably absorbed into his army. However, Pembroke and Tenby were later recovered by Rowland Laugharne for Parliament.

Once Parliament had established full control in 1648 it passed new Militia Acts that replaced lords lieutenant with county commissioners appointed by Parliament or the Council of State. At the same time the term 'Trained Band' began to disappear in most counties. Under the Commonwealth and Protectorate the militia received pay when called out, and operated alongside the New Model Army to control the country. By 1651 the militias of the South Welsh counties appear to have been combined, with the 'South Wales Militia' being ordered to rendezvous at Gloucester to hold the city during the Worcester campaign.

== Pembrokeshire Militia ==
After the Restoration of the Monarchy, the Militia was re-established by The King's Sole Right over the Militia Act 1661 under the control of the king's lords lieutenant, the men to be selected by ballot. This was popularly seen as the 'Constitutional Force' to counterbalance a 'Standing Army' tainted by association with the New Model Army that had supported Cromwell's military dictatorship.

The Pembroke Militia was called out in 1667 during the Second Dutch War when there was an invasion panic following the Raid on the Medway and the Battle of Landguard Fort. On 11 July the appearance of a fleet of 38 sail approaching Milford Haven caused great alarm. The deputy lieutenants called out the militia to line the waterside, and Sir Erasmus Phillipps' troop and the 'County Troop' of horsemen, with many volunteers, made ready. However, when the fleet moored in the haven it was seen to consist of cattle boats bound for Ireland.

The militia forces in the Welsh counties were small, and were grouped together under the direction of the Lord President of the Council of Wales. As Lord President, the Duke of Beaufort carried out a tour of inspection of the Welsh militia in 1684. On 11 August, when he inspected the Pembrokeshire Militia near Haverfordwest, it consisted of a regiment of foot ('all of firelocks', ie musketeers with no pikemen) and one Troop of horse. The 1697 militia returns showed the foot as 456 strong under Colonel Sir Thomas Stepney, 5th Baronet, High Sheriff of Pembrokeshire, organised in seven companies (one commanded by the Mayor of Pembroke), and the troop of 36 horse under Captain Arthur Owen, MP for Pembrokeshire.

Generally the militia declined in the long peace after the Treaty of Utrecht in 1713. Jacobites were numerous amongst the Welsh Militia, but they did not show their hands during the Risings of 1715 and 1745, and bloodshed was avoided.

== 1757 reforms ==
=== Seven Years' War ===
Under threat of French invasion during the Seven Years' War a series of Militia Acts from 1757 re-established county militia regiments, the men being conscripted by means of parish ballots (paid substitutes were permitted) to serve for three years. There was a property qualification for officers, who were commissioned by the lord lieutenant. An adjutant and drill sergeants were to be provided to each regiment from the Regular Army, and arms and accoutrements would be supplied when the county had secured 60 per cent of its quota of recruits.

Pembrokeshire was given a quota of 160 men to raise. Some of the Welsh counties were slow to complete their regiments: the problem was less with the other ranks raised by ballot than the shortage of men qualified to be officers, even after the requirements were lowered for Welsh counties. On 29 July 1758 Sir William Owen, 4th Baronet, of Orielton, the Lord Lieutenant of Pembrokeshire, advertised for suitably qualified men to come forward, and must have obtained a sufficient number: he appointed his eldest son, Hugh Owen (later 5th Baronet) as colonel. The militia ballot was then enforced and the Pembrokeshire regiment received its arms on 7 September 1759. It was embodied for permanent service at Haverfordwest, Pembroke Town and Narberth on 15 December that year.

After a short period of training and organised into four small companies the regiment marched off in January 1760 to take up garrison duties at Bristol. In February it was posted to Monmouthshire, where it alternated between Monmouth and Chepstow until the end of May. It was then posted to Carmarthen, arriving on 6 June, and remained there before returning to Pembrokeshire in October. The following spring it served in Cardiganshire, with companies in various towns including Cardigan and Aberystwyth. It went back to Pembrokeshire in August 1761, with various detachments until it concentrated at Haverfordwest in November 1762. The war was coming to an end, and the warrant to disembody the regiment was executed on 4 December 1762. The disembodied regiment was kept up to strength by means of the ballot over subsequent years, but it was rarely assembled for training.

=== American War of Independence ===
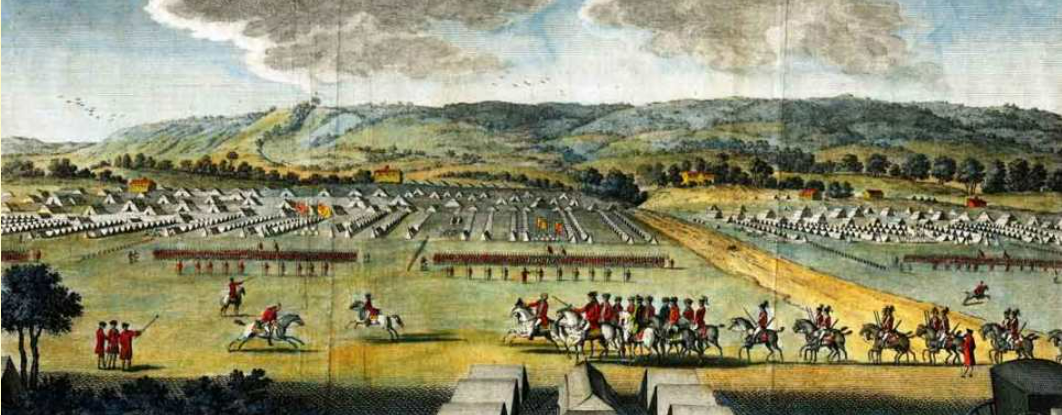
Coxheath Camp in 1778.

The American War of Independence broke out in 1775, and by 1778 Britain was threatened with invasion by the Americans' allies, France and Spain. The militia were embodied, and the Pembrokeshires were called out on 26 March, assembling at Haverfordwest shortly afterwards under the command of Major Wyriot Owen. His second-in-command was Capt John Colby, brother-in-law of the former colonel, now Sir Hugh Owen, 5th Baronet of Orielton and Lord Lieutenant of Pembrokeshire.

On 1 May 1778 the regiment was ordered to Bristol, and from there it was marched to Coxheath Camp near Maidstone in Kent. This was the army's largest training camp, where the Militia were exercised as part of a division alongside Regular troops while providing a reserve in case of French invasion of South East England. The understrength militia units from small counties (Montgomery, Radnor and Pembroke) were attached to guard the artillery park of the division. On 4 November the camp broke up and the Pembrokeshires marched into Maidstone for winter quarters, sending parties back to Haverfordwest to collect recruits. The regiment spent the summer of 1779 in Essex, where it joined other militia regiments at Warley Camp. By November detachments were billeted in villages north and east of London, but the regiment then marched off to winter quarters in Haverfordwest, arriving on 18 December.

Colby took command of the regiment in January 1780 with the rank of lieutenant-colonel. In addition to its balloted companies, the regiment now had two companies enlisted from volunteers, one of which was designated the Light Company. The regiment moved to Pembroke in January, and then in May marched to Tiptree Camp in Essex. The Gordon Riots broke out in London in June, and the Pembroke Militia was called out in aid of the civil power, with short deployments to Brentwood and Romford, without any clashes occurring. In the winter the regiment was quartered across Essex with detachments including Harwich and Wivenhoe. In February 1781 the Harwich detachment relieved the Radnorshire Militia at Landguard Fort and the Wivenhoe detachment moved into Ipswich. The following winter the regiment was again distributed across Essex towns and villages.

In spring 1782 the Pembrokeshires returned to Coxheath Camp, where it became part of a brigade including the Brecknockshire and Merionethshire Militia regiments and Sir John Leicester's Dragoons, all commanded by Lt-Col Colby. The Pembrokeshires remained in Kent for the winter, with two companies at Dover, one at Folkestone and the remainder at Hythe and Sandgate. Much of the duty involved guarding prisoners-of-war. A peace treaty had been agreed and the war was now coming to an end, so warrants to disembody the militia were issued on 28 February 1783. The Pembrokeshires marched back to Haverfordwest where they were disembodied in mid- March.

From 1784 to 1792 the militia ballot was used to keep up militia numbers and the regiments were assembled for their 28 days' annual peacetime training, but to save money only two-thirds of the men were actually mustered each year. The Lord Lieutenant of Pembrokeshire, Richard Philipps, 1st Lord Milford, became Colonel of the Regiment on 10 June 1786, but John Colby remained lieutenant-colonel.

=== French Revolutionary War ===
The militia was already being called out when Revolutionary France declared war on Britain on 1 February 1793. The Pembrokeshire Militia under Lt-Col Colby had already been embodied at Haverfordwest on 2 January and later that month it marched via Worcester to Romford in Essex, where it was stationed until June.

The French Revolutionary Wars saw a new phase for the English militia: they were embodied for a whole generation, and became regiments of full-time professional soldiers (though restricted to service in the British Isles), which the regular army increasingly saw as a prime source of recruits. They served in coast defences, manning garrisons, guarding prisoners-of-war, and for internal security, while their traditional local defence duties were taken over by the Volunteers and mounted Yeomanry.

From July to October 1793 the Pembrokeshire Militia was at Warley Camp, then returned to Romford and Hare Street for the winter, during which it received a draft of newly balloted men from Pembrokeshire. Between February and June 1794 it was quartered across various Essex villages before concentrating at Warley. In November it transferred to Yarmouth in Norfolk, where all ranks were billeted in public houses and inns until May 1795. That month it moved into a tented camp outside the town. In October and November it went to various village before settling at Holt for the winter. In April 1796 the regiment joined the garrison at Landguard Fort where it provided 'additional gunners'.

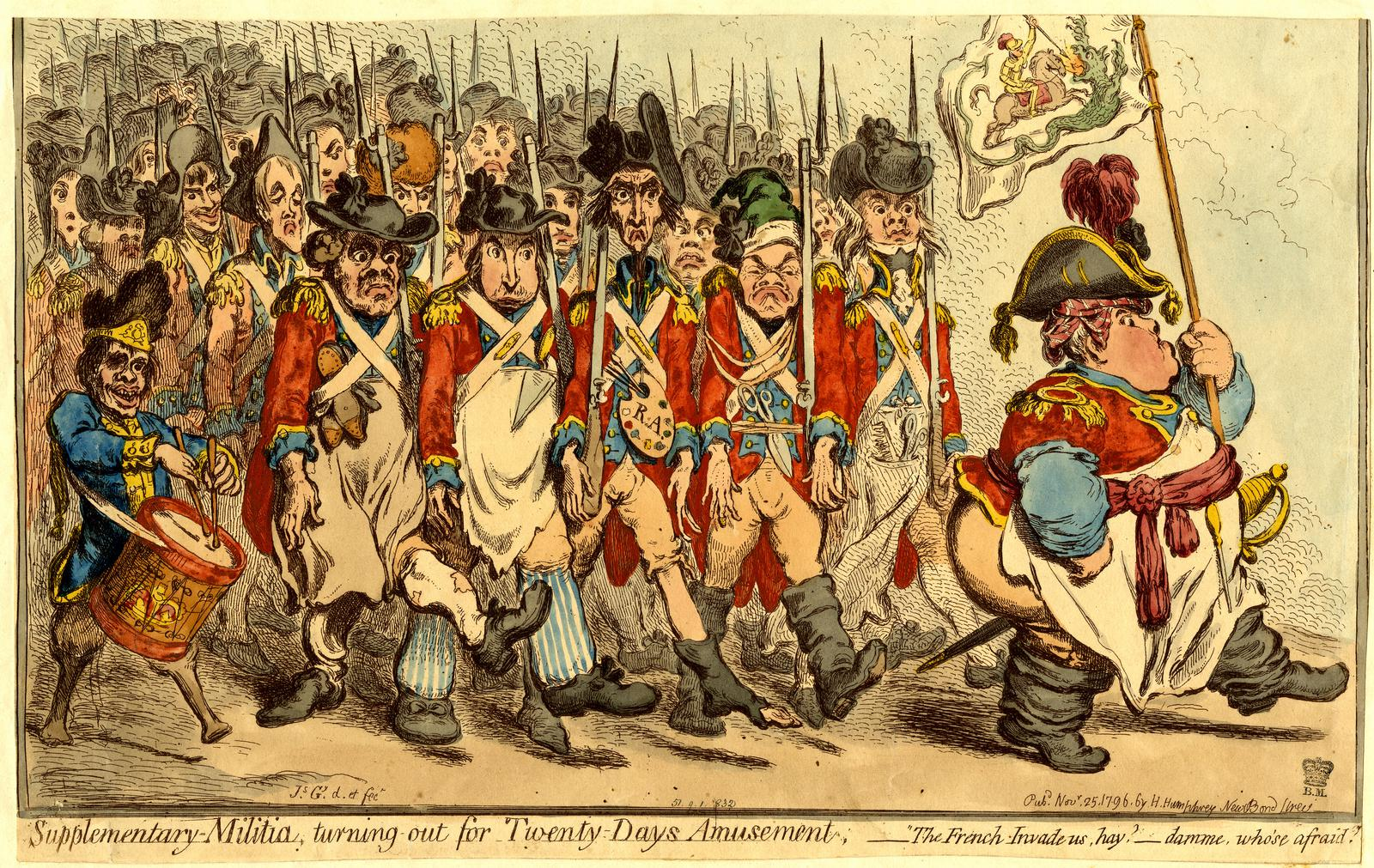
Supplementary-Militia, turning-out for Twenty Days Amusement: 1796 caricature by James Gillray.

In a fresh attempt to have as many men as possible under arms for home defence in order to release regulars, in 1796 the Government created the Supplementary Militia, a compulsory levy of men to be trained in their spare time, and to be incorporated in the Regular Militia in emergency. Pembrokeshire's new militia quota was fixed at 331 men. Lieutenant-Col Colby went back to Pembrokeshire to supervise the training of the county's supplementaries and was on the scene on 22 February 1797 when a French force landed at Fishguard on the north Pembrokeshire coast. A force of militia, yeomanry and volunteers was quickly gathered at Haverfordwest under the command of Lord Cawdor to oppose this invasion. Colby sent his Pembroke supplementaries to relieve a detachment of the Cardiganshire Militia guarding the prisoners at Pembroke Dock, allowing the better-trained Cardigan men to join Cawdor. Colby himself was probably with Cawdor as an adviser during the minor skirmishing that followed (the Battle of Fishguard) and the subsequent negotiations for the French surrender.

By July the Pembroke supplementaries had completed their training, and those who did not accept a bounty to join the Regular Army were marched off to join the regiment at Landguard Fort. On 13 September the regiment marched to take over garrison duties at Bristol.

=== Ireland 1799 ===
In 1798 a rebellion broke out in Ireland and an Act of Parliament (the Militia (No. 4) Act 1798) was passed to allow English and Welsh militia regiments to serve there. The Pembrokeshires volunteered for six months' service and embarked at Bristol on 6 April 1799. The regiment arrived at Cork on 18 April, by which time the rebellion had been crushed. After six months' uneventful service, Colby (who had been promoted to Colonel on 23 April) endeavoured to induce the men to extend their service, but they were unwilling, and the regiment embarked at Waterford on 10 November.

The officers were aggrieved that Col Colby had bypassed them and taken the proposal to extend the Irish service direct to the other ranks. Some of his subordinates attempted to have him court-martialled. Colby resigned and Lt-Col William Scourfield became commandant.

In May 1800 The regiment went into camp on Maker Heights as part of the Plymouth garrison, under the second-in-command, Maj John Lloyd. In common with other small Welsh militia units, the Pembrokeshires provided men to assist the gunners in the redoubts protecting the naval dockyard. Having supplied numbers of volunteers to the Line Regiments, the Pembrokeshires were now down to 170 men out of an establishment of 370, reduced to 201 in 1802 as the war came to a conclusion. After winter quarters in Carmarthen the regiment was back in Haverfordwest when the Treaty of Amiens was signed on 25 March 1802. The Pembrokeshire Militia was disembodied there early in April.

=== Napoleonic Wars ===
However, the Peace of Amiens was short-lived and the regiment was embodied again on 25 March 1803. It was now under Lt-Col Owen Philipps who had become commandant on 2 July 1802. However, he joined the regiment late, and it was marched from Haverfordwest to Chelmsford, Essex, under Maj John Mathias in mid-May. It then established regimental headquarters (HQ) at Colchester with detachments across Essex, and was brought up to strength by a draft of supplementary militiamen.

For several years, the regiment had informally used the title of Royal Pembrokeshire Militia: on 23 April 1804 this was made official when, along with 11 other Welsh militia regiments, it was granted the 'Royal' prefix.

The HQ remained at Colchester until the summer of 1806, when the detachments were called in and the regiment concentrated at Maldon before joining the Harwich garrison. In June 1808 the regiment transferred to the Bristol garrison. The following month the Royal Pembrokeshires (except one man) volunteered to be attached to the 43rd (Monmouthshire) Light Infantry for service with Sir John Moore in the Peninsular War in Spain. Although the offer was not taken up, the regiment was thanked by both the Secretary at War and King George III. It was about this time that the regiment was redesignated the Royal Pembroke Fuzileers (Fusiliers). (Note: The title on the Regimental Colour was actually 'Royal Pembroke Fuziliers', and during the early 19th Century the regiment increasingly used 'Pembroke' in place of 'Pembrokeshire'.)

In May 1809 the Royal Pembroke Fusiliers marched to Hastings in Sussex, and then on to Bexhill-on-Sea, where it joined the Welsh Militia Brigade, which also included the Royal Flint and Royal Merioneth Militia. This brigade was dispersed in January 1810 and the regiment, now greatly understrength after supplying numerous volunteers to the line regiments, went to Playden Barracks near Rye and then back to Bristol with a detachment at Milford Haven in Pembrokeshire. The regiment was redesignated the Royal Pembroke Light Infantry on 30 March 1810; as well as a change in training the drums were replaced by bugles and the sergeants' Spontoons by light flintlock fusils.

=== Ireland 1811–12 ===
In January 1811 and again in June the regiment, still at Bristol, volunteered to serve in Ireland, or in the Peninsula if required. It embarked for Ireland on 8 September. Meanwhile, on 17 July 1811 it had received another new designation: it was now the Royal Pembrokeshire Rifle Corps (or simply Royal Pembroke Rifles). This entailed a change of uniform and eventually of weaponry, the Baker rifle and sword bayonet replacing the Brown Bess smoothbore musket and socket bayonet.

By April 1812 the regiment was stationed at Ballinasloe, about 16 miles (26 km) from Athlone. The country was disturbed, with frequent acts of terrorism and attacks on soldiers. In May it moved to Antrim, with half the regiment detached to Carrickfergus. At the end of its tour of duty, the regiment marched to Dundalk about 21 April 1813 and sailed to Liverpool. It then marched back to Pembrokeshire, reaching Haverfordwest on 17 June. It remained there, with a detachment at Milford Haven, for the rest of the war, supplying volunteers to reinforce the regulars. Napoleon abdicated on 6 April 1814, ending the war, and the Royal Pembroke Rifles was disembodied on 24 June. Unlike some other regiments, it was not re-embodied when Napoleon escaped from Elba and initiated the short Waterloo campaign.

=== Long Peace ===
After Waterloo there was another long peace. Although officers continued to be commissioned into the militia and ballots were still occasionally held, the regiments were rarely assembled for training (only in 1818, 1821 and 1831) and the permanent staffs of sergeants and drummers (who were occasionally used to maintain public order) were progressively reduced. However, the regimental band remained active, paid for privately by the officers.

== 1852 Reforms ==
The long-standing national Militia of the United Kingdom was revived by the Militia Act 1852, enacted during a period of international tension. As before, units were raised and administered on a county basis, and filled by voluntary enlistment (although conscription by means of the Militia Ballot might be used if the counties failed to meet their quotas). Training was for 56 days on enlistment, then for 21–28 days per year, during which the men received full army pay. Under the Act, Militia units could be embodied by Royal Proclamation for full-time home defence service in three circumstances:

1. 'Whenever a state of war exists between Her Majesty and any foreign power'.
2. 'In all cases of invasion or upon imminent danger thereof'.
3. 'In all cases of rebellion or insurrection'.

he 1852 Act introduced Artillery Militia units in addition to the traditional infantry regiments. Their role was to man coastal defences and fortifications, relieving the Royal Artillery (RA) for active service. One of the regiments chosen for conversion to artillery in 1853 was the Royal Pembroke Rifles, which became the Royal Pembroke Artillery Militia. It was given an establishment of 431 all ranks, organised into four batteries, but for several years the numbers recruited were barely half that many.

=== Crimean War and after ===
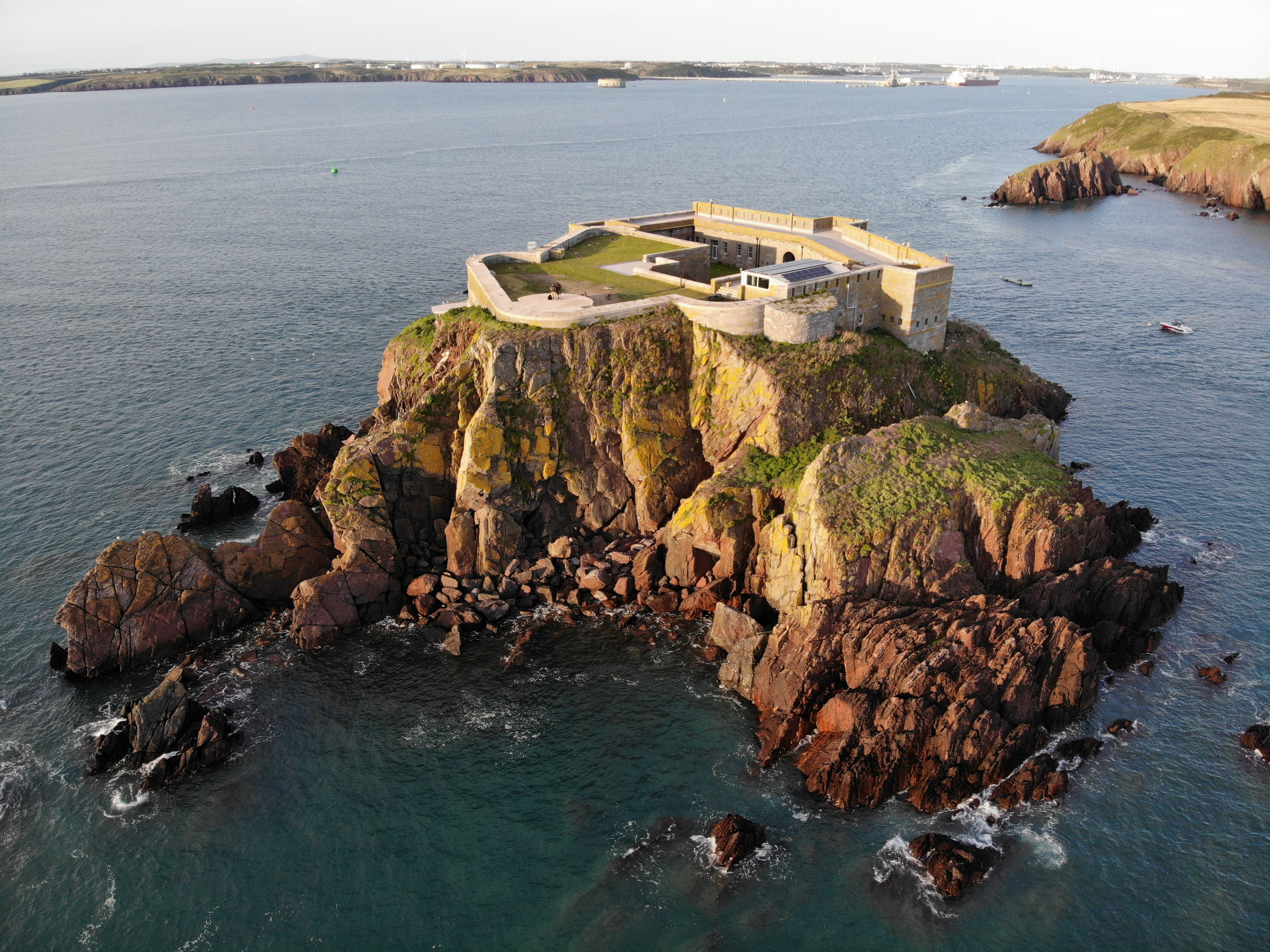
Thorne Island, with the fort visible on the summit.

War having broken out with Russia in 1854 and an expeditionary force sent to the Crimea, the militia began to be called out for home defence. The Royal Monmouth Light Infantry (RMLI) were embodied in May and stationed at Pembroke Dock, where they volunteered for overseas garrison service. The non-commissioned officers (NCOs) and men of the Royal Pembroke Artillery, not yet embodied, made the same offer. The regiment was assembled for its first 28-day training at Haverfordwest on 12 June, but it was not until 30 January 1855 that it was embodied for permanent service, with 200 gunners enrolled, together with a small band of German musicians. The regiment began a period of intensive training in the Milford Haven defences. In August it took over security duties at Pembroke Dock from the Royal Marines, and in August No 1 Company with detachment of the other companies took up duties with the RA on Thorne Island. Work on a fort on this island had begun in 1852, and by 1855 it was armed with nine 68-pounder smoothbore muzzle-loading guns mounted on traversing carriages, sited to created a crossfire with Dale Fort to deny the entrance of the Haven to hostile ships.

Just before Christmas 1855, a severe storm cut Thorne Island off from the mainland and supplies ran out. However, the commanding officer and surgeon of the RMLI at Pembroke Dock chartered a small steamer, and got close enough to throw some supplies onto the landing stage on the island. In April 1856 the other three companies of the Royal Pembroke Artillery moved into Pembroke Dock from Haverfordwest and provided gun detachments to man the gun towers round the Royal Navy Dockyard and other forts around the Haven. It also provide a number of volunteers who transferred to the RA.

The Treaty of Paris signed on 30 March 1856 brought the war to an end, and in July the Royal Pembroke Artillery returned to Haverfordwest and was disembodied. The regiment returned to the normal system of annual training in 1857. It volunteered for duty in 1858 during the Indian Mutiny but the offer was not taken up.

=== Royal Carmarthen and Pembroke Artillery ===
In 1861 the War Office decided to amalgamate the small Welsh county militia contingents into larger regiments. The decision was made to convert the Royal Carmarthen Rifles to artillery and amalgamate it with the understrength Royal Pembroke Artillery. In June 1861 the Royal Carmarthen and Pembroke Artillery Militia came into being. The two contingents retained their HQs and stores at Carmarthen and Haverfordwest, the Pembroke establishment being set at 384 gunners organised into four batteries. Sir Hugh Owen remained joint lt-col-cmdt with Sir James Williams-Drummond, 3rd Baronet, of the Carmarthens. There is no record of the Carmarthen and Pembroke contingents training together. The Pembroke militia quota (384 men) was increased to 436 in 1868, and by that date the enrolled strength was 434. In 1871 the Royal Pembroke Artillery regained its independence and title, with 432 effectives out of a new establishment of 526 men.

=== Royal Pembroke Artillery ===
The Militia Reserve introduced in 1867 consisted of present and former militiamen who undertook to serve overseas in case of war. From 1871 the militia came under the War Office rather than their county lords lieutenant. Around a third of the recruits and many young officers went on to join the regular army. Following the Cardwell Reforms a mobilisation scheme began to appear in the Army List from December 1875. This assigned places in an order of battle of the 'Garrison Army' to militia artillery units: the Royal Pembroke Artillery's war station was at Pembroke, including Stack Rock Fort, South Hook Fort, Popton Fort, Fort Hubberstone, West Blockhouse Fort, Thorne Island, Scoveston Fort, Mumbles (Swansea) and St Catherine's Fort (Tenby).

The Royal Artillery and Militia Artillery were reorganised on 14 April 1882, when 11 territorial divisions of garrison artillery were formed, each consisting of a number of brigades. (Note: In contemporary Royal Artillery terminology, a 'brigade' was a group of batteries grouped together for administrative rather than tactical purposes, the officer in command normally being a lieutenant-colonel rather than a brigadier-general or major-general, the ranks usually associated with command of an infantry or cavalry brigade.) In each division the 1st Brigade was composed of Regular RA batteries, the others being a varying number of militia corps. The Royal Pembroke Artillery joined the Welsh Division, becoming 4th Brigade, Welsh Division, RA, with four batteries. (All the militia artillery continued to use their old titles unofficially.) On 1 July 1889 the territorial divisions were reorganised into three large divisions of garrison artillery, the Welsh militia units joining the Western Division and regaining their county titles (without any 'Royal' prefixes, though these were unofficially retained).

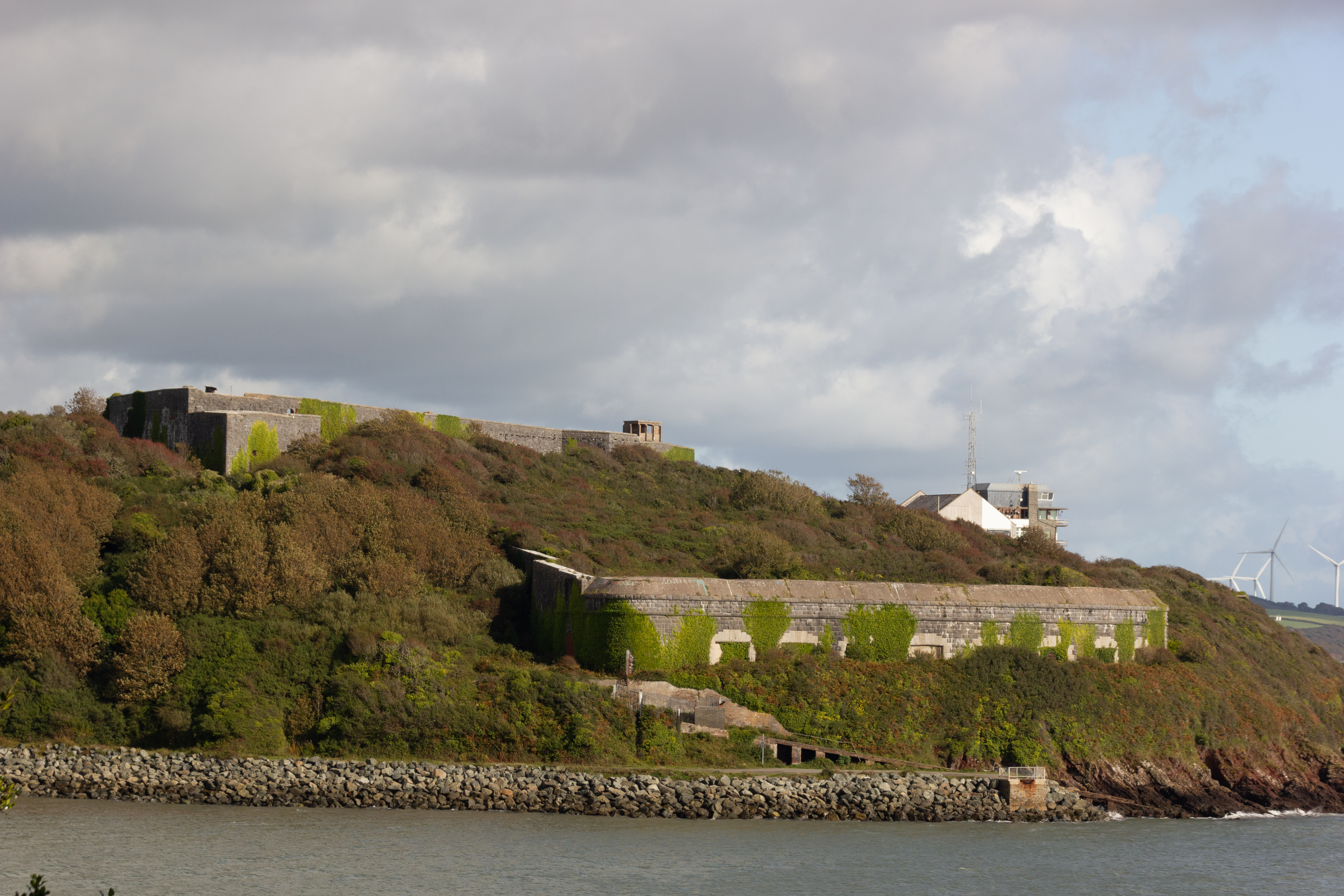
Fort Hubberstone, Milford Haven.

In April 1885 the Pembroke brigade's HQ moved from Haverfordwest to Fort Hubberstone. This had been built in 1863–5 as an addition to the Milford Haven defences. Sited on a headland it commanded excellent views of the entrance to the Haven. It consisted of a defensible barracks with 28 guns and accommodation for 250 men. The original guns were probably 9-inch rifled muzzle-loading (RML) guns, but by 1872 eight RML 7-inch guns on Moncrieff Disappearing Carriages had been added. In 1881 the armament consisted of a number of 10-inch guns in Barbette mountings.

By 1885 the enrolled strength of the Pembroke Artillery had fallen to 319, 206 short of establishment: moving the HQ from a town to an isolated coastal fort had a detrimental effect on recruitment, and the unit never again reached full strength. However, the Welsh militia artillery often carried out their annual training at the same time, so the batteries around the Haven could cooperate in live-firing exercises against target vessels, and with the searchlights and defensive mines operated by the Royal Engineers. In May 1894 the Pembroke, Carmarthen, and Cardigan Artillery carried out combined night firing from Hubberstone, Popton and South Hook forts respectively, and the following year all three units trained together at Popton.

The RA was divided into field and garrison branches in 1899, with all the militia and volunteer units becoming part of the Royal Garrison Artillery (RGA). The RGA's divisional structure was abolished in 1902, when the unit became the Pembroke Royal Garrison Artillery (Militia).

During the Second Boer War the Militia Reservists were called out in November 1899 to reinforce the regulars. Then the Pembroke Artillery was embodied from 4 May to 3 October 1900 for home defence. No only did it man Hubberstone Fort, but detachments went to Hakin, Milford Haven and Thorne Island.

== Disbandment ==
After the Boer War, the future of the Militia was called into question. There were moves to reform the Auxiliary Forces (Militia, Yeomanry and Volunteers) to take their place in the six Army Corps proposed by St John Brodrick as Secretary of State for War. Some batteries of militia artillery were to be converted to field artillery. However, little of Brodrick's scheme was carried out.

Under the sweeping Haldane Reforms of 1908, the Militia was replaced by the Special Reserve, a semi-professional force whose role was to provide reinforcement drafts for regular units serving overseas in wartime. Although all seven officers and 125 out of 184 other ranks of the Pembroke RGA (M) accepted transfer to the Special Reserve Royal Field Artillery, as the Pembroke Royal Field Reserve Artillery on 5 July 1908, it was disbanded on 16 March 1909.

== Commanders ==
The following officers commanded the regiment:

=== Commandants ===
- Col Sir Thomas Stepney, 5th Baronet, 1697
- Col Sir Hugh Owen, 5th Baronet of Orielton, 1759
- Maj-Cmdt Wyriot Owen, 1779
- Lt-Col-Cmdt John Colby, 2 January 1780, resigned 1800
- Lt-Col Cmdt William Scourfield, promoted April 1800
- Lt-Col Owen Philipps, promoted 2 July 1802
- Lt-Col Sir Hugh Owen Owen, 2nd Baronet, appointed 16 September 1830
- Lt-Col John Owen, promoted 3 March 1875
- Lt-Col Francis Edwardes, promoted 6 October 1888
- Lt-Col W.C. Cope promoted 4 February 1903

=== Honorary colonels ===
The following served as Honorary Colonel:

- Col George Rice-Trevor, Lord Dynevor, former CO of the Royal Carnarvon Rifles, appointed 12 August 1861, died 7 October 1869
- Col Sir Hugh Owen Owen, 2nd Baronet, appointed 10 February 1875
- Col Francis Edwards, appointed 6 May 1903

== Heritage and ceremonial ==
=== Colours ===
When the regiment was inspected in 1684 the colour of the Horse Troop's cornet was unrecorded, but it bore a scroll inscribed 'FOR GOD AND THE KING'. In 1759 the regiment carried two Regimental Colours in addition to the King's Colour, a most unusual arrangement. Both of these colours were blue, one carrying the Coat of arms of Pembrokeshire, the other those of Haverfordwest. By 1808 the (single) regimental colour was Garter blue appropriate to a Royal regiment: it bore the Union Flag in the canton and in the centre was a Union Wreath of roses, thistles and shamrocks encircling the title 'ROYAL PEMBROKE FUZILIERS' with the Prince of Wales's feathers, coronet and 'ICH DIEN' motto above.The regiment ceased to carry colours when converted to a rifle corps in 1811, and the last pair carried were laid up in St Mary's Church, Haverfordwest, in 1909.

=== Uniforms and insignia ===
From about 1759 the regiment wore a red uniform with blue facings. When converted to a rifle corps it adopted a Rifle green uniform with black facings similar to the Rifle Brigade. On conversion to artillery in 1852 the regiment adopted the blue uniform with red facings of the RA.

About 1800 the regiment wore a universal Shako plate without regimental distinctions. An officer's Epaulette of about 1811 carries as a badge the Prince of Wales's feathers, coronet and motto with a scroll beneath inscribed 'ROYAL PEMBROKE'. After conversion to artillery, the regiment wore the standard RA helmet plate of the Royal Arms over a gun, the scroll beneath reading 'MILITIA ARTILLERY', changed to 'WELSH DIVISION' in 1882. An embroidered title reading 'WELSH' was worn on both shoulder straps 1882–89. After 1889 the scroll on the helmet plate read 'ROYAL PEMBROKE'. From 1901 the letter 'M' (for Militia) appeared between the gun and the lower scroll. About 1860 the badge on the officers' pouchbelt plate consisted of the Prince of Wales's feathers, coronet and motto inside a crowned garter inscribed 'ROYAL PEMBROKE'. On khaki service dress the brass shoulder title read 'RGA' over 'PEMBROKE' and the cap badge was that of the RA with 'M' between the gun and the scroll. The officers' Field service cap badge was an embroidered 'bomb' over a scroll reading 'ROYAL PEMBROKE'.

=== Precedence ===
In 1759 it was ordered that militia regiments on service were to take precedence from the date of their arrival in camp. In 1760 this was altered to a system of drawing lots where regiments did duty together. During the War of American Independence and French Revolutionary War the counties were given an order of precedence determined by ballot each year. However, counties like Pembrokeshire with no more than two companies were ignored. Another ballot for precedence took place in 1803 at the start of the Napoleonic War and remained in force until 1833: Pembrokeshire was 54th. In 1833 the King drew the lots for individual regiments and the resulting list continued in force with minor amendments until 1855. The regiments raised before the peace of 1763 took the first 47 places and the Royal Pembroke Rifles became 28th.

The first artillery militia units formed were given an order of precedence in 1855 based on alphabetical order: the Royal Pembroke was 24th, which happened to be the same as the Royal Carmarthen's precedence as an infantry regiment. The combined regiment used this precedence 1861–71; after it split the Royal Carmarthen retained the precedence of 24th among artillery militia units but the Royal Pembroke dropped to 31st.

== See also ==
- Trained Bands
- Militia (English)
- Militia (Great Britain)
- Militia (United Kingdom)
- Welsh Division, Royal Artillery
- Western Division, Royal Artillery
- Royal Carmarthen Artillery
- Militia Artillery units of the United Kingdom and Colonies
