= Royal Merioneth Rifles =

Auxiliary unit of the British Army

Merionethshire Militia Royal Merioneth Rifles 4th (Royal Carnarvon & Merioneth Militia) Bn, Royal Welch Fusiliers
- Active: 1661–1908
- Country: England (1661–1707); Kingdom of Great Britain (1707–1800); United Kingdom (1801–1908)
- Branch: Militia
- Role: Infantry
- Size: Company to Battalion
- Part of: Royal Welch Fusiliers
- Garrison/HQ: Dolgellau

The Merionethshire Militia, later the Royal Merioneth Rifles, was an auxiliary (Note: It is incorrect to describe the British Militia as 'irregular': throughout their history they were equipped and trained exactly like the line regiments of the regular army, and once embodied in time of war they were fulltime professional soldiers for the duration of their enlistment.) regiment reorganised from earlier precursor units in the Welsh county of Merionethshire during the 18th Century. Primarily intended for home defence, it served in Britain and Ireland through all Britain's major wars. After a series of shortlived mergers it was finally amalgamated into a militia battalion of the Royal Welch Fusiliers that was disbanded in 1908.

== Merioneth Trained Bands ==
The universal obligation to military service in the Shire levy was long established in England and was extended to Wales. King Henry VIII called a 'Great Muster' in 1539, which showed 1886 men available for service in the County of Merioneth, of whom 420 had 'harness' (armour), 'the residue weaponed with bills, spears, elm bows and arrows, clubs and staffs'. Two of the Hundreds had 50 horses between them but in all the other hundreds 'no horses meet to serve the King'.

The legal basis of the militia was updated by two acts of 1557 covering musters (4 & 5 Ph. & M. c. 3) and the maintenance of horses and armour (4 & 5 Ph. & M. c. 2). The county militia was now under the Lord Lieutenant, assisted by the Deputy Lieutenants and Justices of the Peace (JPs). The entry into force of these Acts in 1558 is seen as the starting date for the organised Militia of England and Wales. Although the militia obligation was universal, it was clearly impractical to train and equip every able-bodied man, so after 1572 the practice was to select a proportion of men for the Trained Bands, who were mustered for regular training and were embodied for service when the country was threatened, for example during the Armada crisis of 1588.

In the 16th Century little distinction was made between the militia and the troops levied by the counties for overseas expeditions. However, the counties usually conscripted the unemployed and criminals rather than send the trained bandsmen. Between 1585 and 1602 Merionethshire supplied 450 men for service in Ireland. The men were given three days' 'conduct money' to get to Chester or Bristol, the main ports of embarkation for Ireland. Conduct money was recovered from the government, but replacing the weapons issued to the levies from the militia armouries was a heavy cost on the counties.

With the passing of the threat of invasion, the trained bands declined in the early 17th Century. Later, King Charles I attempted to reform them into a national force or 'Perfect Militia' answering to the king rather than local control. The Merioneth Trained Bands of 1638 consisted of 200 men, half armed with muskets and half 'Corslets' (body armour, signifying pikemen). They also mustered 15 horse. Merionethshire was ordered to send 100 men overland to Newcastle upon Tyne for the Second Bishops' War of 1640. However, substitution was rife and many of those sent on this unpopular service would have been untrained replacements.

=== Civil Wars ===
Control of the militia was one of the areas of dispute between Charles I and Parliament that led to the English Civil War. When open war broke out between the King and Parliament, neither side made much use of the trained bands beyond securing the county armouries for their own full-time troops. Most of Wales was under Royalist control for much of the war, and was a recruiting ground for the King's armies.

Once Parliament had established full control in 1648 it passed new Militia Acts that replaced lords lieutenant with county commissioners appointed by Parliament or the Council of State. At the same time the term 'Trained Band' began to disappear in most counties. Under the Commonwealth and Protectorate the militia received pay when called out, and operated alongside the New Model Army to control the country.

== Merioneth Militia ==
After the Restoration of the Monarchy, the Militia was re-established by the Militia Act 1661 under the control of the king's lord lieutenants, the men to be selected by ballot. This was popularly seen as the 'Constitutional Force' to counterbalance a 'Standing Army' tainted by association with the New Model Army that had supported Cromwell's military dictatorship.

The militia forces in the Welsh counties were small, and were grouped together under the direction of the Lord President of the Council of Wales. As Lord President, the Duke of Beaufort carried out a tour of inspection of the Welsh militia in 1684. He found that the Merionethshire Militia consisted of one small Troop of Horse, and two companies of Foot. The Militia returns of 1697 grouped the counties of Merioneth and Carnarvon together, with 530 Foot commanded by Colonel Hugh Nanny and 48 Horse under Captain Owen Barton.

Generally the militia declined in the long peace after the Treaty of Utrecht in 1713. Jacobites were numerous amongst the Welsh Militia, but they did not show their hands during the Risings of 1715 and 1745, and bloodshed was avoided.

== 1757 reforms ==
=== Seven Years' War ===
Under threat of French invasion during the Seven Years' War a series of Militia Acts from 1757 re-established county militia regiments, the men being conscripted by means of parish ballots (paid substitutes were permitted) to serve for three years. There was a property qualification for officers, who were commissioned by the lord lieutenant. An adjutant and drill sergeants were to be provided to each regiment from the Regular Army, and arms and accoutrements would be supplied when the county had secured 60 per cent of its quota of recruits.

Merionethshire's quota was an independent company of just 80 men, but Major-General the Earl of Cholmondeley, who was Lord Lieutenant of Merionethshire and several other counties, found that he was unable to raise militia in most of his Welsh counties. The problem was less with the other ranks raised by ballot than the shortage of men qualified to be officers, even after the requirements were lowered for Welsh counties. The Merionethshire Militia finally received its weapons on 25 January 1763 at Dolgelly (Dolgellau). However, by then the war was drawing to a close: the company was not embodied for fulltime service and the rest of the militia were disembodied in early 1763.

Thereafter the disembodied militia were kept up to strength by periodic use of the ballot and were sometimes assembled for annual training.

=== American War of Independence ===
The American War of Independence broke out in 1775, and by 1778 Britain was threatened with invasion by the Americans' allies, France and Spain. The militia were called out for fulltime service, and the Merionethshire Company was embodied for the first time on 31 March 1778. The militia ballot was extremely unpopular, and Merionethshire saw anti-militia riots in 1779.

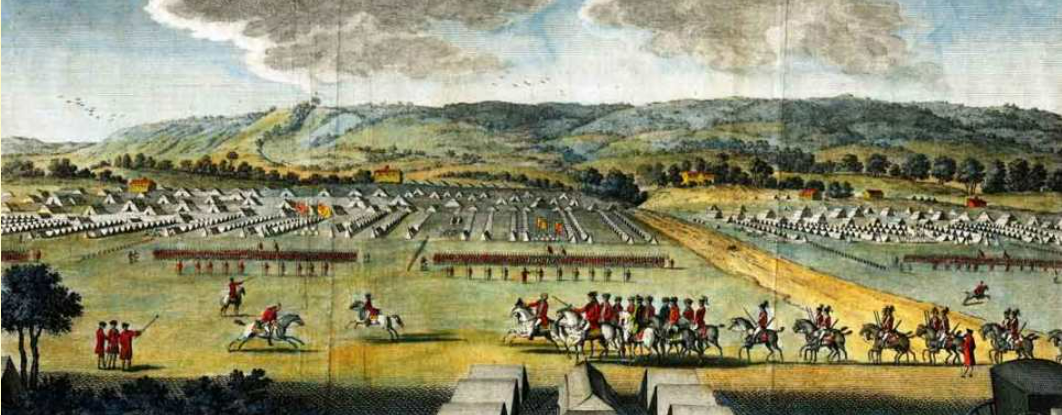
Coxheath Camp in 1778.

During this war militia units served in garrisons and guarded prisoners-of-war. They were also sometimes posted to large summer encampments. Coxheath Camp near Maidstone in Kent was the army's largest training camp, where the militia were exercised alongside regular troops while providing a reserve in case of French invasion of South East England. In 1782 the Merionethshire Militia was stationed there as part of part of a brigade including the Brecknockshire and Pembrokeshire Militia regiments and Sir John Leicester's Dragoons.

A peace treaty had been agreed and the war was now coming to an end, so warrants to disembody the militia were issued on 28 February 1783. From 1784 to 1792 the militia ballot was used to keep up the numbers and the regiments were assembled for their 28 days' annual peacetime training, but to save money only two-thirds of the men were actually mustered each year.

=== French Revolutionary War ===
The militia was already being embodied when Revolutionary France declared war on Britain on 1 February 1793. The French Revolutionary Wars saw a new phase for the English militia: they were embodied for a whole generation, and became regiments of full-time professional soldiers (though restricted to service in the British Isles), which the regular army increasingly saw as a prime source of recruits. They served in coast defences, manning garrisons, guarding prisoners of war, and for internal security, while their traditional local defence duties were taken over by the Volunteers and mounted Yeomanry.

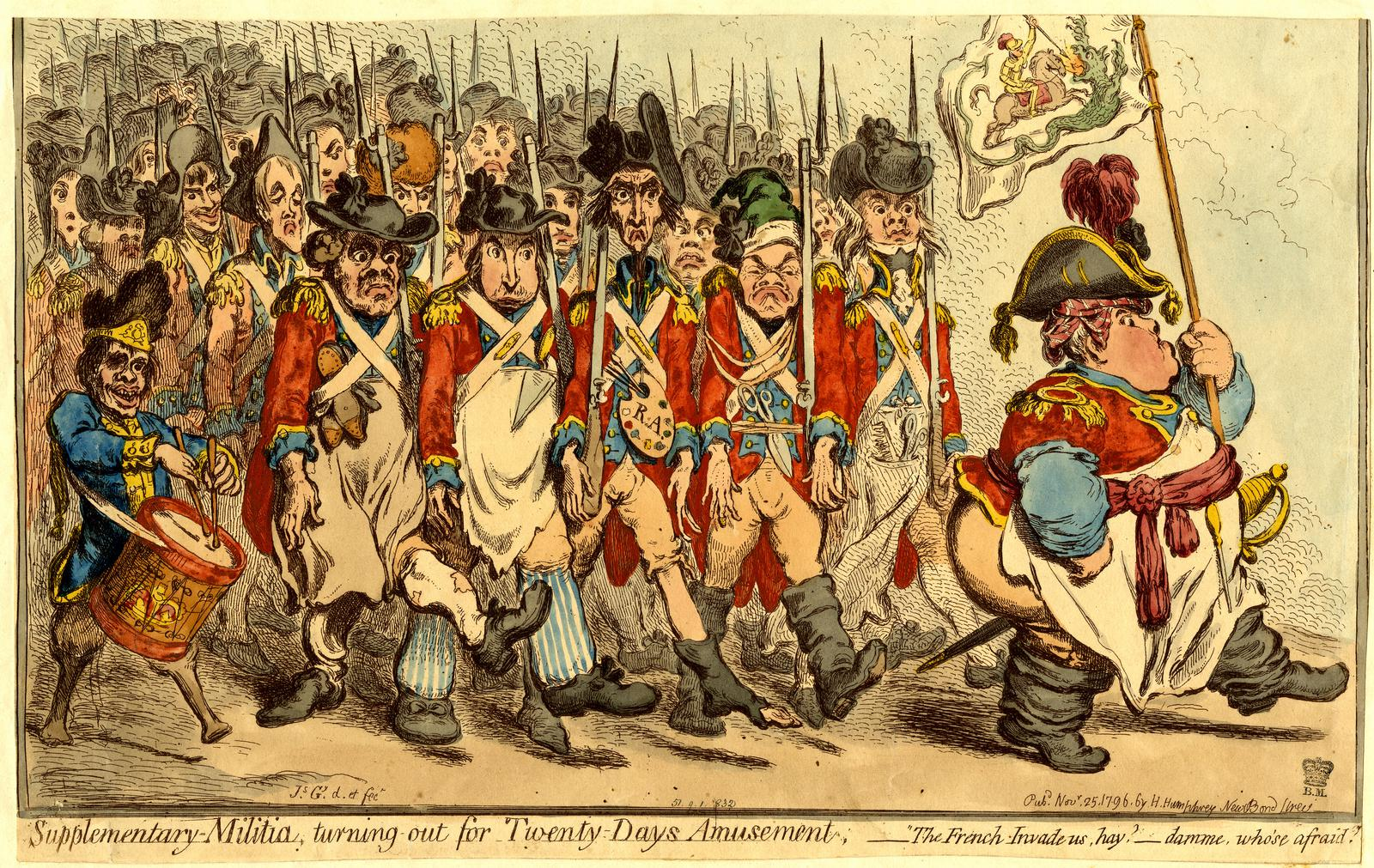
Supplementary-Militia, turning-out for Twenty Days Amusement: 1796 caricature by James Gillray.

In a fresh attempt to have as many men as possible under arms for home defence in order to release regulars, in 1796 the Government created the Supplementary Militia, a compulsory levy of men to be trained in their spare time, and to be incorporated in the Regular Militia in emergency. Merionethshire's new militia quota was fixed at 174 men.

In 1798 a rebellion broke out in Ireland and the Militia (No. 4) Act 1798 was passed to allow English and Welsh militia regiments to serve in Ireland. The Merionethshires were among several Welsh units that volunteered for this service and was one of the 13 militia regiments sent there immediately.

By 1802 the war was coming to an end and the militia were being partially demobilised: Merionethshire's quota was reduced to 121. The Treaty of Amiens was concluded on 27 March 1802 and the militia regiments were disembodied. Sir Watkin Williams-Wynn, 5th Baronet, was lord lieutenant of both Merionethshire and Denbighshire. In 1803 he secured a warrant to merge the small militia quotas of the two counties, but this was unpopular in Merionethshire, where a group of influential gentlemen longed a strong protest and the merger was not carried out.

=== Napoleonic Wars ===
The Peace of Amiens was shortlived and the militia were embodied once more in March 1803. By July the Merionethshires were in a tented camp at Stokes Bay, Gosport, as part of a militia brigade including the Brecknock, Carmarthen, Hereford and Monmouth regiments. They shared duties including boat and hospital guards round Gosport and Haslar, guarding prisoners-of-war, and manning Fort Blockhouse. Griffith Howell Vaughan was appointed Lieutenant-Colonel of the regiment on 10 June 1803.

On 23 April 1804 the Merioneths, along with 11 other Welsh militia regiments, were officially granted the 'Royal' prefix, becoming the Royal Merionethshire Militia. During the summer of 1805, when Napoleon was massing his 'Army of England' at Boulogne for a projected invasion, the regiment was stationed on the Isle of Wight. Its 148 men in 3 companies under Maj Richard Hughes Lloyd shared Sandown Barracks with the 2nd Battalion 56th Regiment as part of Maj-Gen Sir John Whitelocke's force.

In 1809 a Welsh Militia Brigade was formed at Bexhill-on-Sea in Sussex, comprising the Royal Flint Rifles and Royal Pembroke Fusiliers as well as the Royal Merioneth. The brigade was dispersed in January 1810. That year the regiment was redesignated again, as the Royal Merionethshire Light Infantry.

=== Merioneth Local Militia ===
While the Regular Militia were the mainstay of national defence during the Revolutionary and Napoleonic Wars, they were supplemented from 1808 by the Local Militia, which were part-time and only to be used within their own districts. These were raised to counter the declining numbers of Volunteers, and if their ranks could not be filled voluntarily the Militia Ballot was employed. Many of the remaining Volunteer units transferred en masse to the Local Militia, and the rest were disbanded. Instructors were provided by the Regular Militia, and annual training was for a maximum of 28 days.

All the Volunteer Corps in Merionethshire transferred to the local militia:

- Cader Idris Corps (formed 7 March 1804)
- Edeirnion Corps (formed about December 1803)
- Penllyn Corps (formed November 1803)
- Barmouth Volunteer Company (formed 18 April 1804)

These were combined into a single regiment from 24 September 1808. The Lord Lieutenant, Sir Watkin Williams-Wynn, 5th Baronet, considered the discipline of the Cader Idris Corps (the largest) to be deficient, and the command of the new regiment was given to Lt-Col Commandant Richard Watkin Price of the Penllyn Corps, with Major-Commandant Hugh Davies of the Edeirnion Corps promoted to Lt-Col and second-in-command. Watkin Wynn also asked for government approval for the Barmouth Company to continue to store their arms locally, rather than at the regimental headquarters 40 miles (64 km) at Bala, because the company had already shown its usefulness in 1805 by placing an armed guard on a shipwreck to prevent looting. In the event the Cader Idris men were also allowed to store their arms at Dolgelly instead of Bala.

There was serious disturbances among the local militia across the country in 1809 when they did not get the guinea they were entitled to for 'necessaries' under the Act of Parliament. In the case of the Merioneth regiment, the men were dissatisfied that it had been spent on knapsacks rather than given to them personally. Nevertheless, the Merioneth regiment was considered generally well-disciplined, when it was assembled for training. It was embodied at the time of the Battle of Waterloo in 1815, but like all the local militia it was disbanded in 1816.

=== Long Peace ===
After Waterloo there was another long peace. Although officers continued to be commissioned into the disembodied militia and ballots were still occasionally held, the regiments were rarely assembled for training (only in 1818, 1821 and 1831) and the permanent staffs of sergeants and drummers (who were occasionally used to maintain public order) were progressively reduced. Lieutenant-Col Griffith Vaughan remained in command into the 1840s; the Hon E.M.L. Mostyn was appointed as his successor on 17 December 1847 (Lt-Col Vaughan died the following year).

== 1852 Reforms ==
The Militia of the United Kingdom was revived by the Militia Act 1852, enacted during a renewed period of international tension. As before, units were raised and administered on a county basis, and filled by voluntary enlistment (although conscription by means of the Militia Ballot might be used if the counties failed to meet their quotas). Training was for 56 days on enlistment, then for 21–28 days per year, during which the men received full army pay. Under the Act, militia units could be embodied by Royal Proclamation for full-time home defence service in three circumstances:

1. 'Whenever a state of war exists between Her Majesty and any foreign power'.
2. 'In all cases of invasion or upon imminent danger thereof'.
3. 'In all cases of rebellion or insurrection'.

The Dolgelly-based Merionethshire regiment was revived, moving its headquarters to Bala. Edward Morgan, a half-pay captain in the 75th Foot and veteran of the Peninsular War was appointed as Lt-Col Commandant on 20 October 1852, and new officers were commissioned. The following year it was renamed as the Royal Merionethshire Rifle Corps. As a rifle unit it adopted the Rifle green uniform replaced drums with bugles, and gave up carrying Regimental colours.

=== Crimean War and after ===
War having broken out with Russia in 1854 and an expeditionary force sent to the Crimea, the militia began to be called out for home defence. The Royal Merioneth Rifles were embodied during May 1855 but remained at Bala until the end of the war.

In 1860 the War Office ordered the amalgamation of the small Welsh militia quotas to form larger regiments. The Royal Merionethshire Rifles were officially merged with the Royal Montgomeryshire Rifles to form the Royal Montgomery & Merioneth Rifles, with its headquarters at Bala. However, the two contingents or 'wings' continued to operate separately, training at Welshpool and Bala respectively. Lieutenant-Col Charles John Tottenham of the Denbigh Yeomanry was appointed Major-Commandant of the, Merioneth wing on 28 May 1861. The merger was rescinded in 1867 when the regiments reverted to their previous titles; the Bala regiment was simply the 'Royal Merioneth Rifles' from 1871. Lieutenant-Col Tottenham remained in command.

The Militia Reserve introduced in 1867 consisted of present and former militiamen who undertook to serve overseas in case of war.

=== Cardwell Reforms ===
Under the 'Localisation of the Forces' scheme introduced by the Cardwell Reforms of 1872, the militia were brigaded with their local Regular and Volunteer battalions on 1 April 1873. For the Royal Merioneth Rifles this was in No 23 Brigade Sub-District covering the militia of the five northern counties of Wales (Anglesey, Carnarvon, Denbigh, Flint and Merioneth), grouped with the 23rd Foot (the Royal Welch Fusiliers) and the Denbigh and Flint rifle volunteers.

The militia now came under the War Office rather than their county lord lieutenants and battalions had a large cadre of permanent staff (about 30). Around a third of the recruits and many young officers went on to join the Regular Army. Lieutenant-Col Tottenham remained in command of the Royal Merioneth until 1874. His son, Charles Robert Worsley Tottenham, who was serving as a captain in the regiment, was promoted to Maj-Cmdt of the Royal Merioneth Rifles on 4 May 1875.

Following the Cardwell Reforms a mobilisation scheme began to appear in the Army List from December 1875. This assigned places in an order of battle to Militia units serving Regular units in an 'Active Army' and a 'Garrison Army'. The Royal Merioneth Militia's assigned war station was with the Garrison Army in the Pembroke defences.

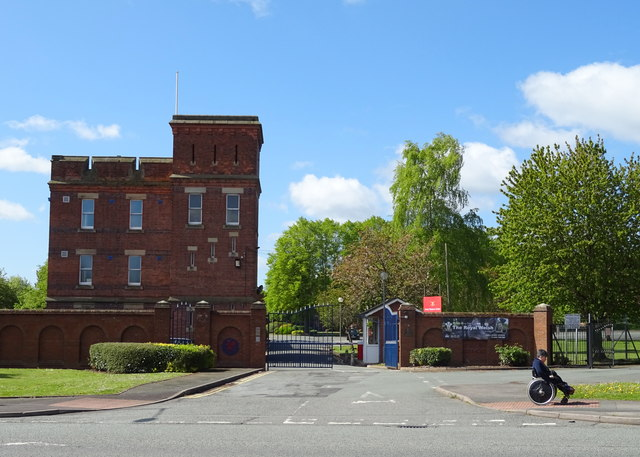
Hightown Barracks, Wrexham, built as the depot for the Royal Welch Fusiliers in 1877.

Once again the small size of the Welsh regiments led to mergers. In 1876 the Royal Merioneth Rifles were amalgamated with the Royal Denbigh Rifles at Wrexham to form the Royal Denbigh & Merioneth Rifles, 800 strong. Major Tottenham continued as an officer in the Royal Denbigh & Merioneth after merger.

In 1877 the Royal Denbighshire & Merioneth Rifles moved out of their barracks on Regent Street, Wrexham, and moved into the Royal Welch Fusiliers' new depot at Hightown Barracks outside the town.

On 19 April 1878 the militia reserve was called out during the period of international tension over the Russo-Turkish War. The contingent from the Royal Denbigh & Merioneth Rifles was sent to Enniskillen in Ireland to train with 1st Battalion, Royal Welch Fusiliers.

== Royal Welsh Fusiliers ==
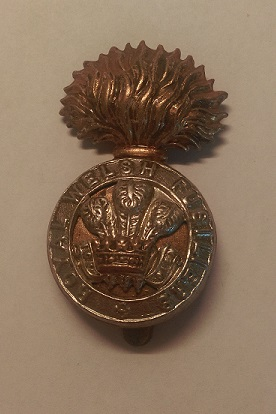
Royal Welsh Fusiliers' cap badge.

The Childers Reforms of 1881 took Cardwell's reforms further, with the militia formally joining their linked regiments. Of the four militia regiments in No 23 Sub-District, the Royal Anglesey Light Infantry had been converted to Royal Engineers and the Royal Flint Rifles became 6th Battalion King's Royal Rifle Corps (KRRC). The others formed two battalions of the Royal Welsh Fusiliers (RWF) on 1 July 1881: (Note: The archaic spelling 'Welch' traditionally used by the regiment was officially dropped for 'Welsh' in 1881, but the regiment continued to use it unofficially; it was restored in 1922.)

- 3rd (Royal Denbigh & Merioneth Militia) Battalion
- 4th (Royal Carnarvon Militia) Battalion

The 6th (Royal Flint Militia) Bn, KRRC, was disbanded in 1889 and a Flint contingent was added to the 3rd Bn RWF, at which time the Merionethshire contingent was transferred from the 3rd to the 4th Bn RWF. The battalion was thereafter listed as the 4th (Royal Carnarvon & Merioneth Militia) Battalion.

Unlike the rest of the RWF, which was concentrated at the regimental depot at Wrexham, the 4th Bn retained Carnarvon Barracks. From 1887 onwards annual training was increasingly held at a tented camp at Cae Toplis Field outside the town, though in 1891 it was held at Altcar Training Camp near Liverpool and in 1895, 1896 and 1899 under canvas at Dolgelly in Merioneth. In the late 1880s recruitment became a problem in rural North Wales, where many employers refused to hire militiamen and where there was a shortage of Welsh-speaking recruiting sergeants. The RWF attempted to rectify the latter problem by selecting Welsh-speaking sergeants from the Regular battalions. In 1893 the eight companies of the 4th Bn were reorganised on a geographic basis with appropriate titles and where possible under a captain from the district; E, F and G Companies were based in Merioneth:

- A Company: Portmadoc Company
- B Company: Conway Company
- C Company: Carnarvon Company
- D Company: Lleyn Company

- E Company: Bala Company
- F Company: Dolgelly Company
- G Company: Ffestiniog (Merioneth Quarries) Company
- H Company: Bangor Company

=== Second Boer War and disbandment ===
The 4th Bn RWF was embodied during the Second Boer War, serving at Plymouth and providing militia reserve drafts for the regular battalions serving overseas. In 1908 most of the militia was converted into the Special Reserve, but the 4th (Royal Carnarvon & Merioneth Militia) Bn RWF did not transfer and was disbanded on 31 March 1908.

== Heritage and ceremonial ==
=== Uniforms and insignia ===
At the 1684 inspection one Merionethshire foot company carried a red Company colour, the others were blue: each had the Cross of St George in the canton. The cornet of the troop of horse was crimson with a scroll inscribed 'NEC TEMERE NEC TIMIDE' surmounted by a coronet from which emerges a bull's head facing left.

After 1804 the uniform was red with the blue facings appropriate to a royal regiment. In 1853 this changed to Rifle green with blue facings, replaced by black facings (similar to the Rifle Brigade) in 1855. During the amalgamation of 1861–67, the Merioneth companies retained their black facings while the Montgomery companies kept their scarlet facings. After amalgamation into the Royal Denbigh and Merioneth Rifles in 1876 the facing were given as Royal blue and then as scarlet.

Officers' Coatee buttons about 1800 had the design of the Prince of Wales's feathers, coronet and 'ICH DIEN' motto, with the word 'ROYAL' above and 'MERIONETH' below; later both parts of the title were below the plume. About 1867 the officers' pouchbelt plate carried a crowned Maltese cross with at the centre the Prince of Wales's plume, coronet and motto within an oval incsribed 'ROYAL MERIONETH RIFLES', itself surrounded by a wreath. Beneath the cross was a light infantry bugle-horn.

After 1881 the militia battalions of the Royal Welsh Fusiliers adopted that regiment's uniform and insignia, the rifle regiments giving up their green uniforms and adopting the red of the RWF. By 1886 the Royal Denbigh & Merioneth had been presented with new Colours.

=== Precedence ===
From 1760 militia regiments doing duty together decided their relative precedence by drawing lots. During the War of American Independence the order of precedence of county militia regiments was determined by an annual ballot. However, units such as the Merioneth Militia that did not constitute a full battalion were not included. The order balloted for at the start of the French Revolutionary War in 1793 remained in force throughout the war, but again Merionethshire was excluded. Another ballot for precedence took place in 1803 at the start of the Napoleonic War and remained in force until 1833: Merionethshire was 65th. In 1833 the King drew the lots for individual regiments, and the Royal Merioneth Rifles were 60th. The Royal Montgomery Rifles were 57th, and the combined regiment used this between 1860 and 1867. The Royal Merioneth then reverted to 60th for the rest of its independent existence.

== See also ==
- Trained Bands
- Militia (English)
- Militia (Great Britain)
- Militia (United Kingdom)
- Royal Carnarvon Rifles
- Royal Denbigh Rifles
- Royal Flint Rifles
- Royal Montgomeryshire Militia
- Royal Welch Fusiliers
