= Western Division, Royal Artillery =

Western Division, RA
- Cap Badge of the Royal Regiment of Artillery
- Active: 4 April 1882–31 December 1901
- Country: United Kingdom
- Branch: British Army
- Type: Administrative division
- Part of: Royal Artillery
- Garrison/HQ: Plymouth (1882–89); Devonport (1889–1901)

The Western Division, Royal Artillery, was an administrative grouping of garrison units of the Royal Artillery, Artillery Militia and Artillery Volunteers within the British Army's Western District from 1882 to 1902.

== Organisation ==
Under General Order 72 of 4 April 1882 the Royal Artillery (RA) broke up its existing administrative brigades (Note: In RA terminology, a 'brigade' was a group of independent batteries grouped together for administrative rather than tactical purposes, the officer in command being usually a lieutenant-colonel rather than a brigadier-general or major-general, the ranks usually associated with command of an infantry or cavalry brigade.) of garrison artillery (7th–11th Brigades, RA) and assigned the individual batteries to 11 new territorial divisions. These divisions were purely administrative and recruiting organisations, not field formations. Most were formed within the existing military districts into which the United Kingdom was divided, and for the first time associated the part-time Artillery Militia with the regulars. Shortly afterwards the Artillery Volunteers were also added to the territorial divisions. The Regular Army batteries were grouped into one brigade, usually of nine sequentially-numbered batteries and a depot battery. For these units the divisions represented recruiting districts – batteries could be serving anywhere in the British Empire and their only connection to brigade headquarters (HQ) was for the supply of drafts and recruits. The artillery militia units (sometimes referred to as regiments) already comprised a number of batteries, and were redesignated as brigades, losing their county titles in the process. The artillery volunteers, which had previously consisted of numerous independent Artillery Volunteer Corps (AVC) of various sizes, sometimes grouped into administrative brigades, had been consolidated into larger AVCs in 1881, which were now affiliated to the appropriate territorial division.

== Composition 1882–89 ==
Western Division, RA, listed seventh in order of precedence, was organised within Western District with the following composition:

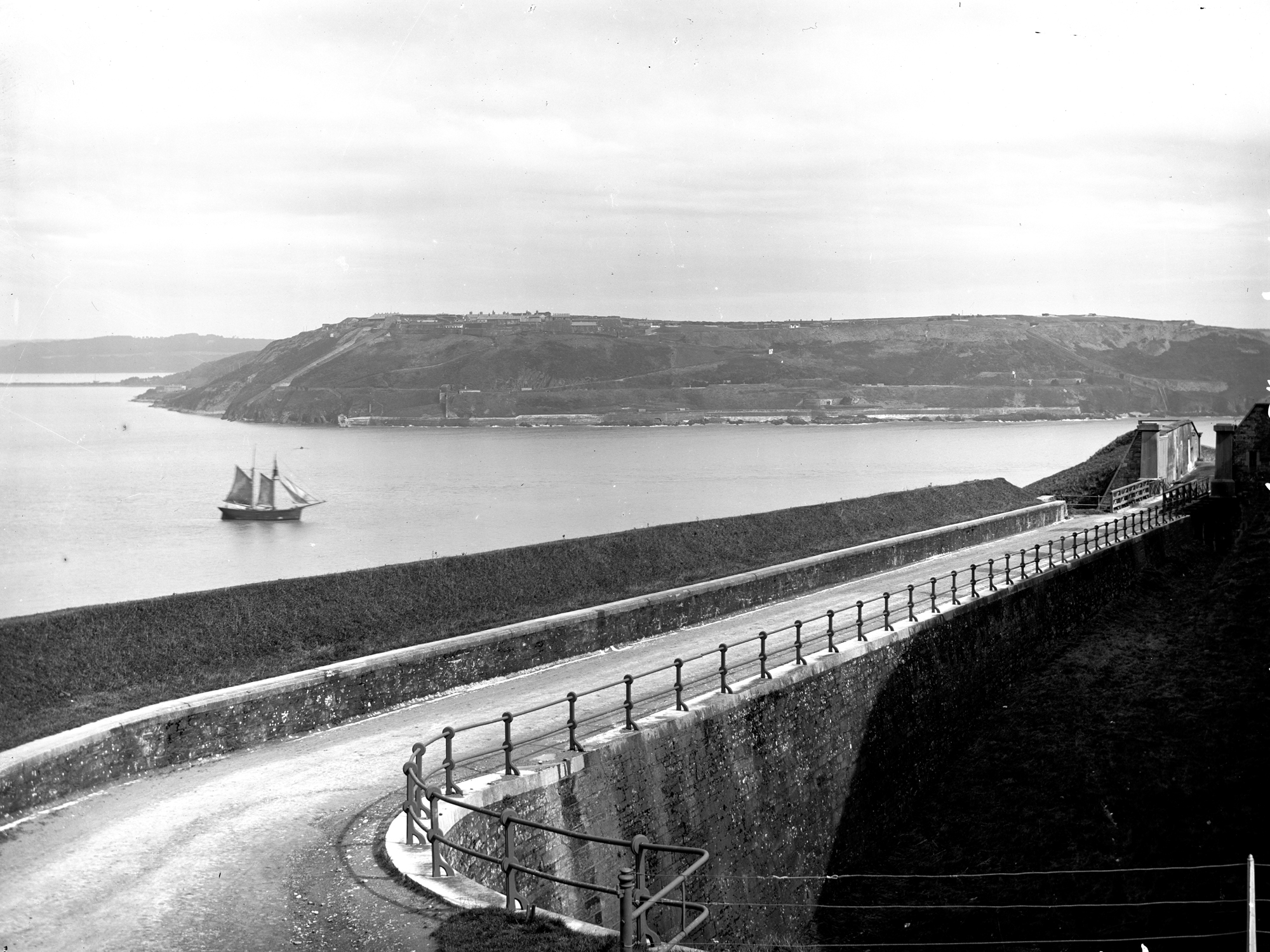
Fort Carlisle seen from Camden Fort, both being parts of the Cork Harbour defences.

- Headquarters (HQ) at Plymouth
- 1st Brigade
  - HQ at Devonport
  - 1st Bty at Fort Carlisle, Cork Harbour – formerly 19th Bty, 7th Bde
  - 2nd Bty at Spike Island, Cork Harbour – formerly 8th Bty, 8th Bde
  - 3rd Bty at Camden Fort, Cork Harbour – formerly 19th Bty, 10th Bde
  - 4th Bty at Devonport – formerly 20th Bty, 7th Bde
  - 5th Bty at Gwalior – formerly 2nd Bty, 8th Bde
  - 6th Bty at Morar Cantonment – formerly 12th Bty, 9th Bde
  - 7th Bty at St Helena – formerly 10th Bty, 7th Bde
  - 8th Bty at Cape of Good Hope – formerly 8th Bty, 7th Bde
  - 9th Bty at Mauritius – formerly 11th Bty, 7th Bde** 10th Bty – new Bty formed 1887
  - Depot Bty at Devonport – formerly Depot Bty, 8th Bde
- 2nd Brigade at Falmouth – formerly Cornwall and Devon Miners Artillery Militia (4 btys)
- 3rd Brigade at Devonport – formerly Devon Artillery Militia (5 btys)
- 1st Devonshire Artillery Volunteers at Exeter
- 2nd Devonshire Artillery Volunteers at Devonport
- 1st Cornwall (Duke of Cornwall's) Artillery Volunteers at Bodmin

== Reorganisation 1889–1902 ==
In 1889 the garrison artillery was reorganised again into three large territorial divisions of garrison artillery and one of mountain artillery. The names of the divisions seemed arbitrary, with the Scottish units being grouped in the Southern Division, for example, but this related to where the need for coastal artillery was greatest, rather than where the units recruited. The artillery militia units regained their county designations. From 1 August 1891 garrison artillery batteries were termed companies, and some were grouped into double companies at this time before reverting to their previous numbers in March 1894.

- HQ at Devonport

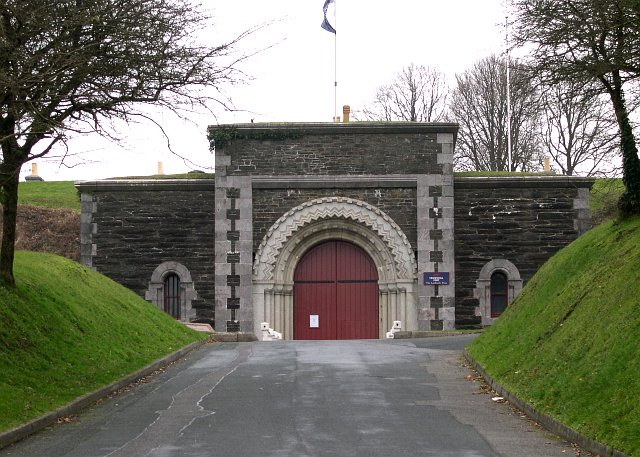
Crownhill Fort, part of the Plymouth defences, and depot of the Western Division.

=== Regulars ===
- 1st Co at Halifax, Nova Scotia – formerly 2nd Cinque Ports Bty; became 46th Co, RGA
- 2nd Co at Quetta – formerly 5th Welsh Bty; became 100th Co, RGA
- 3rd Co at Bermuda – formerly 2nd North Irish Bty; became 32nd Co, RGA
- 4th Co at Plymouth – formerly 9th North Irish Bty; 4th (Siege Train) Co 1895; became 70th Co, RGA
- 5th Co at Guernsey and Alderney – formerly 5th South Irish Bty; became 65th Co, RGA
- 6th Co at Calcutta – formerly 8th Northern Bty; became 101st Co, RGA
- 7th Co at Plymouth – formerly 5th Northern Bty; 7th (Siege Train) Co 1892; became 71st Co, RGA
- 8th Co at Devonport – formerly 6th Northern Bty; 7A Co 1891–94; became 85th Co, RGA
- 9th Co at Pembroke Dock – formerly 6th Welsh Bty; 5A Co 1891; 9th (Heavy) Co 1894; became 72nd Co, RGA
- 10th Co at Halifax, Nova Scotia – formerly 3rd London Bty; became 99th Co, RGA
- 11th Co at Roorkee – formerly 1st Welsh Bty; became 45th Co, RGA
- 12th Co at Agra – formerly 5th Western Bty; 12th (Siege Train) Co 1894; became 2nd Co, RGA
- 13th Co at Mhow – formerly 4th Welsh Bty; 13th (Heavy) Co 1894; became 3rd Co, RGA
- 14th Co at Plymouth – formerly 7th Welsh Bty; became 68th Co, RGA
- 15th Co at Aden – formerly 7th Northern Bty; 15th (Siege Train) Co 1892; became 92nd Co, RGA
- 16th Co at Roorkee – formerly 2nd Welsh Bty; became 44th Co, RGA
- 17th Co at Barbados – formerly 6th London Bty; became 98th Co, RGA
- 18th Co at Devonport – formerly 8th Welsh Bty; $A Co 1891–94; became 73rd Co, RGA
- 19th Co at Pembroke Dock – formerly 6th Western Bty; became 64th Co, RGA
- 20th Co at Halifax, Nova Scotia – formerly 4th Cinque Ports Bty; 1A Co 1891–94; became 47th Co, RGA
- 21st Co at Jersey – formerly 8th South Irish Bty; 19th Co 1891–94; became 83rd Co, RGA
- 22nd Co at Bombay – formerly 1st Western Bty; 20th Co 1891–94; became 30th Co, RGA
- 23rd Co at Jamaica – formerly 3rd Welsh Bty; 3A Co 1891–94; became 31st Co, RGA
- 24th Co at Bermuda – formerly 3rd Southern Bty; 3B Co 1891; disbanded 1894
- 25th Co at Devonport – formerly 10th Western Bty; 17A Co 1891; disbanded 1894
- 25th Co – reformed 1894, formerly 23rd Southern Co; became 59th Co, RGA
- 26th Co – formed 1895; became 60th Co, RGA
- 27th Co – transferred 1894, formerly 3rd Southern Sub-Depot Co; became 6th Co, RGA
- 28th Co – converted from 8th Bty, 12th Bde, 1898; became 17th Co, RGA
- 29th Co – converted from 8th Bty, 13th Bde, 1898; became 18th Co, RGA
- 30th Co – converted from 2nd Bty, 25th Bde, 1900; became 25th Co, RGA
- 31st Co – formed 1900; became 27th Co, RGA
- Depot Co at Crownhill Fort, Plymouth – formerly Western Depot Bty; 1st Depot Co 1895; became No 3 Depot Co, RGA
  - 1st Sub-Depot Co at Sunderland – formerly Northern Depot Bty; 2nd Depot Co 1895; became No 5 Depot Co, RGA
  - 2nd Sub-Depot Co – transferred 1892, formerly 1st Eastern Sub-Depot Co; 40th Southern Co 1895

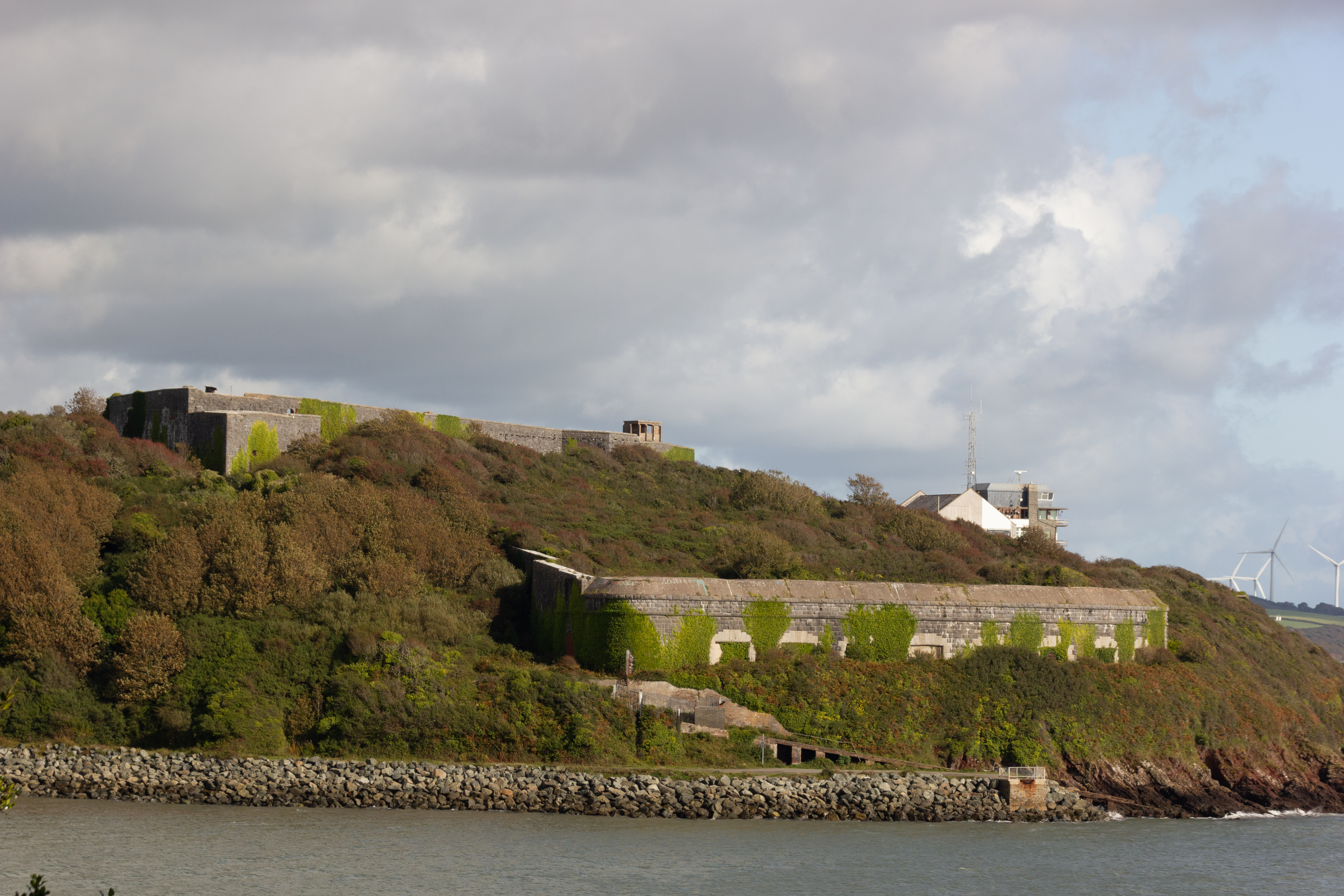
Fort Hubberstone, part of the defences of Pembroke Dock.

=== Militia ===
- Cornwall & Devon Miners Artillery (Western Division) at Falmouth (4 Btys)
- Devon Artillery (Western Division) at Devonport (4 Btys)
- Durham Artillery (Western Division) at Sunderland and Hartlepool (6 Btys)
- Glamorgan Artillery (Western Division) at Swansea (4 Btys)
- Northumberland Artillery (Western Division) at Berwick-upon-Tweed (6 Btys)
- Carmarthen Artillery (Western Division) at Carmarthen (6 Btys)
- Pembroke Artillery (Western Division) at Fort Hubberstone, Milford Haven (4 Btys)
- Yorkshire Artillery (Western Division) at Scarborough (6 Btys)
- Cardigan Artillery (Western Division) at Aberystwyth (6 Btys)

=== Volunteers ===
- Tynemouth Artillery Volunteers at Tynemouth
- 1st Northumberland Artillery Volunteers at Newcastle upon Tyne
- 2nd Northumberland (Percy) Artillery Volunteers at Alnwick
- 1st Devonshire Artillery Volunteers at Exeter
- 2nd Devonshire Artillery Volunteers at Devonport
- 1st Cornwall (Duke of Cornwall's) Artillery Volunteers at Falmouth
- 1st Glamorganshire Artillery Volunteers at Swansea
- 2nd Glamorganshire Artillery Volunteers at Cardiff – independent 1890
- 1st Yorkshire (East Riding) Artillery Volunteers at York
- 2nd Yorkshire (East Riding) Artillery Volunteers at Hull
- 1st Gloucestershire Artillery Volunteers at Bristol
- 1st Yorkshire (North Riding) Artillery Volunteers at Middlesbrough
- 1st Lincolnshire Artillery Volunteers at Grimsby
- 1st Berwick-on-Tweed Artillery Volunteers at Berwick-upon-Tweed
- 1st Durham Artillery Volunteers at Sunderland
- 2nd Durham (Seaham) Artillery Volunteers at Seaham
- 3rd Durham Artillery Volunteers at South Shields
- 4th Durham Artillery Volunteers at West Hartlepool
- 1st Yorkshire (West Riding) Artillery Volunteers at Leeds
- 2nd Yorkshire (West Riding) Artillery Volunteers at Bradford
- 4th Yorkshire (West Riding) Artillery Volunteers at Sheffield
- 1st Newcastle-upon-Tyne Artillery Volunteers at Newcastle upon Tyne
- 1st Monmouthshire Artillery Volunteers at Newport – independent 1890

== Disbandment ==
In 1899 the Royal Artillery was divided into two distinct branches, field and garrison. The field branch included the Royal Horse Artillery (RHA) and the newly named Royal Field Artillery (RFA). The garrison branch was named the Royal Garrison Artillery (RGA) and included coast defence, position, heavy, siege and mountain artillery. The division became Southern Division, RGA. The division became Western Division, RGA. The RGA retained the divisions until they were scrapped on 1 January 1902, at which point the Regular RGA companies were numbered in a single sequence and the militia and volunteer units were designated '--- shire RGA (M)' or '(V)' as appropriate.

== See also ==
- Royal Garrison Artillery
- List of Royal Artillery Divisions 1882–1902
- Southern Division, Royal Artillery
- Eastern Division, Royal Artillery
