= Royal Glamorgan Artillery Militia =

Auxiliary unit of the British Army

Royal Glamorgan Artillery Militia 2nd Brigade, Western Division, RA Glamorgan Artillery (Western Division) RA Glamorgan Royal Garrison Artillery (M)
- Active: 2 December 1854–March 1909
- Country: United Kingdom
- Branch: Militia
- Role: Garrison Artillery
- Part of: Western Division, RA
- Garrison/HQ: Swansea
- Nickname: The Swansea Artillery

The Royal Glamorgan Artillery Militia (RGAM) was a part-time reserve unit of Britain's Royal Artillery based at Swansea in Glamorgan, South Wales, from 1854 to 1909.

== Background ==
The long-standing national Militia of the United Kingdom was revived by the Militia Act 1852, enacted during a period of international tension. As before, units were raised and administered on a county basis, and filled by voluntary enlistment (although conscription by means of the Militia Ballot might be used if the counties failed to meet their quotas). Training was for 56 days on enlistment, then for 21–28 days per year, during which the men received full army pay. Under the Act, Militia units could be embodied by Royal Proclamation for full-time home defence service in three circumstances:

1. 'Whenever a state of war exists between Her Majesty and any foreign power'.
2. 'In all cases of invasion or upon imminent danger thereof'.
3. 'In all cases of rebellion or insurrection'.

The 1852 Act introduced Militia Artillery units in addition to the traditional infantry regiments. Their role was to man coastal defences and fortifications, relieving the Royal Artillery (RA) for active service.

== History ==
In 1854 the Lord Lieutenant of Glamorgan was instructed to raise a corps of militia artillery to man the fortifications proposed for the Glamorganshire coast, particularly Swansea Bay. The unit first appeared in the Army List in September 1854 but it was not until 2 December that its commanding officer was appointed. He was Lieutenant-Colonel Evan Morgan, a former officer of The Rocket Troop, Royal Horse Artillery, who had served in the Peninsular War and the War of 1812. The new corps' headquarters (HQ) was established at Swansea and it was to consist of three batteries. When recruiting opened in August 1855 the unit was awarded the privilege of styling itself the Royal Glamorgan Artillery Militia (following the Royal Glamorgan Light Infantry Militia).

However, recruitment from the coal and iron districts of Glamorgan proceeded slowly, although the ballot was not resorted to. It was not until August 1857 that the unit was embodied at Swansea for its first annual training. The lack of any guns meant that the training that year and the two subsequent years was confined to foot drill and arms drill with carbines. It was reported that the unit would be employed exclusively in defending the coast of Glamorgan – under the 1852 Act the Militia were liable for service anywhere in the United Kingdom – which together with the slowness of recruiting and lack of training may explain why it was never embodied during the Crimean War or the Indian Mutiny.

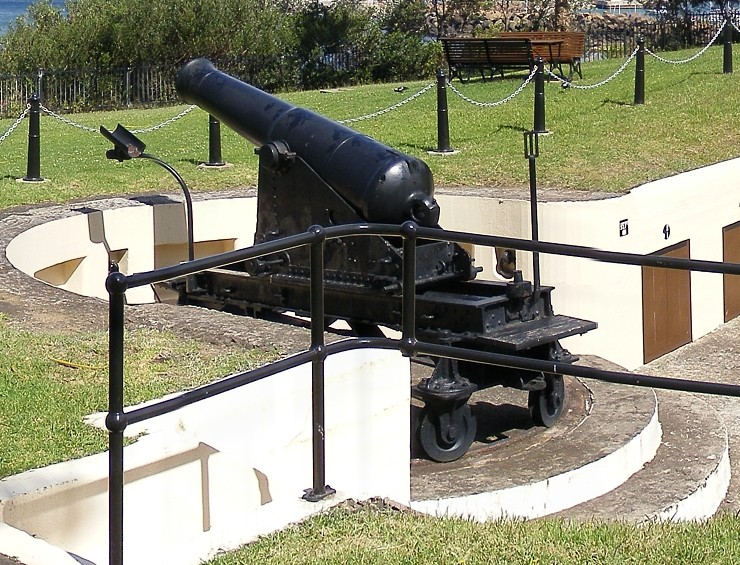
80-pounder rifled muzzle-loading cannon on traversing carriage (Smiths Hill Fort).

In 1859 the corps formed a regimental band, and later that year the permanent staff were in demand as instructors for the various new Volunteer Force units that were being formed, particularly the 1st Glamorganshire Artillery Volunteers at Swansea. In 1860 a pair of 18-pounder muzzle-loading cannon arrived in Swansea for the Volunteers who installed them on the Swansea Embankment. The RGAM were able to use them for their 1860 annual training. A proposal to mount a heavy battery for the RGAM on the salient angle of Swansea Pier was abandoned when it was found that the structure would not support its weight. In June 1861 five 68-pounder muzzle-loaders were installed in a two-tier battery at Lighthouse Island off Mumbles Point. A sergeant and five gunners of the Coast Brigade of the Royal Artillery were responsible for maintaining the battery, but its manning was the responsibility of the RGAM and the Volunteers. In the late 1870s at least two of the 68-pdrs were replaced by 80-pdr rifled muzzle-loaders (Note: Converted from 68-pdr smoothbores.) on traversing slide carriages, but financial stringency prevented any further modernisation and the battery's armament remained unchanged to the end of the 19th Century.

Following the Cardwell Reforms a mobilisation scheme began to appear in the Army List from December 1875. This assigned places in an order of battle of the 'Garrison Army' to Militia Artillery units: the Royal Glamorgan Artillery's war station was at Portsmouth.

After Lt-Col Morgan retired and became the unit's Honorary Colonel, Captain James Simpson Ballard was promoted to commandant, first as Major (21 April 1871), then as Lt-Col (1 January 1875).

The RGAM carried out its annual training every year except 1896. The established strength of the unit was 325, but the enrolled strength never reached this figure, being only 189 in 1863. Nevertheless, the establishment was increased to 414 (four batteries) in 1877, when the actual strength reached 380, averaging 350 thereafter. By 1881 the RGAM's HQ was at Swansea Arsenal, where there were drill purpose guns for training. However, when the men were assembled for training they had to be billeted in inns and lodging houses in Swansea. In 1885 the unit went by train to Devonport to train at the forts guarding Plymouth naval base. Training returned to Swansea the following year, but from 1887 the men camped at Parc Wern, where greater control could be exercised over the men than in billets. The 1888 training was carried out at South Hook Fort at Milford Haven and from 1891 the Haven forts were regularly used.

The Artillery Militia was reorganised into 11 divisions of garrison artillery in 1882, and the Glamorgan unit officially became the 2nd Brigade, Welsh Division, RA, but locally the change was ignored, and the unit was usually known as the 'Glamorgan Artillery' or the 'Swansea Artillery'. After another reorganisation in 1889 the official title was altered to Glamorgan Artillery (Western Division) RA.

From 1902 most units of the Militia artillery formally became part of the Royal Garrison Artillery, the Glamorgan unit taking the title of Glamorgan RGA (M).

== Embodiments ==
The unit was only embodied for home defence once:

- Second Boer War: 1 May to 3 October 1900

It was intended that the Glamorgan unit should garrison Lavernock Battery in the Severn defences, but its armament was obsolescent so instead it spent its period of service at Pembroke Dock and the Haven forts.

== Disbandment ==
After the Boer War, the future of the Militia was called into question. There were moves to reform the Auxiliary Forces (Militia, Yeomanry and Volunteers) to take their place in the six Army Corps proposed by St John Brodrick as Secretary of State for War. Some batteries of Militia Artillery were to be converted to field artillery. However, little of Brodrick's scheme was carried out.

Under the sweeping Haldane Reforms of 1908, the Militia was replaced by the Special Reserve, a semi-professional force whose role was to provide reinforcement drafts for Regular units serving overseas in wartime. The artillery militia was intended to become a reserve for the Royal Field Artillery, and the Glamorgan unit assembled on 4 July 1908 at High Cross Camp, near Newport, for training with an emphasis on field gunnery. On 27 July the Glamorgan RGA (M) transferred to the Special Reserve as the Glamorgan Royal Field Reserve Artillery. However, the policy was changed and all these units were disbanded in March 1909. Instead the men of the RFA Special Reserve would form Brigade Ammunition Columns for the Regular RFA brigades on the outbreak of war.

== Honorary Colonels ==
The following served as Honorary Colonel of the unit:

- Lt-Col Evan Morgan, former commandant, appointed 19 January 1870
- Windham Wyndham-Quin, 4th Earl of Dunraven and Mount-Earl, KP, appointed 17 April 1895
