= The King's Sole Right over the Militia Act 1661 =

Act of the Parliament of England

- Act of Parliament
- Parliament of England
- Long title: An Act declaring the sole Right of the Militia to be in King and for the present ordering & disposing the same.
- Citation: 13 Cha. 2 St. 1. c. 6
- Territorial extent: England and Wales

Dates
- Royal assent: 30 July 1661
- Commencement: 8 May 1661 (Note: Start of session.)
- Repealed: 1 January 1970
Other legislation
Repealed by	Statute Law Revision Act 1863; Statute Law (Repeals) Act 1969

Status: Repealed

History of passage through Parliament

Text of statute as originally enacted

The King's Sole Right over the Militia Act 1661 or the Militia Act 1661 (13 Cha. 2 St. 1. c. 6) was an act of the Parliament of England, long title "An Act declaring the sole Right of the Militia to be in King and for the present ordering & disposing the same." Following the English Civil War, this act finally declared that the king alone, as head of the state, was in supreme command of the army and navy for the defence of the realm.

The short bill, described as a "temporary Bill for settling the Militia", was rushed through the Commons and Lords on 16 July 1661 after the failure earlier in the session of a more comprehensive bill. A revised version of the failed bill was passed the following year.

== Subsequent developments ==
The whole act, except for the preamble, was repealed by section 1 of, and the schedule to, the Statute Law Revision Act 1863 (26 & 27 Vict. c. 125), which came into force on 28 July 1863.

The preamble, so far as unrepealed, was repealed by section 1 of, and part I of the schedule to, the Statute Law (Repeals) Act 1969, which came into force on 1 January 1970.

== See also ==
- Prerogative

== Bibliography ==
- Chisholm, Hugh, ed. (1911). "Prerogative" . Encyclopædia Britannica. Vol. 22 (11th ed.). Cambridge University Press. pp. 280–281.
