= Canton (heraldry) =

Heraldic charge

Argent a canton gules

The canton of a baronet augments the arms of the Knowles baronets, of Lovell Hill

In heraldry, a canton is a charge placed upon a shield. It is, by default a square in the upper dexter corner, but if in the sinister corner is blazoned a canton sinister. A canton is classed by some heraldic writers as one of the honorable ordinaries; but, strictly speaking, it is a diminutive of the quarter, being two-thirds the area of that ordinary. However, in the armorial roll of Henry III, the quarter appears in several coats which in later rolls are blazoned as cantons. The canton, like the quarter, appears in early arms, and is always shown with straight lines.

The chequer, a pane of the field of chequy, can be considered a diminutive of the canton, though it cannot be a charge on its own. A canton sinister is a canton placed on the sinister side of the shield. An "enlarged sinister canton" appears in the arms of William Wilde Lotter.

A plain, uncharged canton (sometimes a canton voided is also used this way) can be used as a mark of distinction, that is, not a mark of peculiar honour, but a mark denoting that the bearer is a stranger in blood. For example, a groom who does not descend from the bride's family but who adopts the bride's last name after the marriage might, upon receipt of a Royal Licence permitting this, use the bride's family's coat of arms with an uncharged canton or canton voided.

Special cantons may be added to the coat of arms of baronets to indicate their rank and difference their arms from other members of the family. The canton is typically the Red Hand of Ulster (in sinister), but Baronets of Nova Scotia use the shield of the arms of Nova Scotia as a canton.

== See also ==
- Canton (flag)
