= List of Royal Artillery Divisions 1882–1902 =

A number of 'Divisions' were organised on a territorial basis by Britain's Royal Artillery (RA) in 1882 in an attempt to improve the administration and recruitment of garrison artillery units. These also provided for the first time a higher organisation for the part-time Artillery Militia and Artillery Volunteers. In 1889 these divisions were reorganised into fewer, larger organisations. The RA was split into two distinct branches in 1899, with the Royal Garrison Artillery (RGA) taking over all the units in these divisions, which were scrapped in 1902.

== 1882–89 ==
Since 1877 the regular batteries of the Royal Artillery had been organised as 11 'brigades' (Note: In RA terminology, a 'brigade' was a group of independent batteries grouped together for administrative rather than tactical purposes, the officer in command being usually a lieutenant-colonel rather than a brigadier-general or major-general, the ranks usually associated with command of an infantry or cavalry brigade.) of which 7th–11th Brigades were garrison artillery. Under General Order 72 of 4 April 1882 these five brigades were broken up and the garrison batteries of the regular Royal Artillery and all the part-time Artillery Militia units in the UK were organised into 11 territorial 'divisions'. (Note: As with the brigades the RA used the term 'division' for an administrative group rather than a field formation.) Shortly afterwards, the Artillery Volunteers were added to the divisions.

Within each division, the 1st Brigade comprised the regular batteries, assigned arbitrarily from the previous brigades and redesignated sequentially as '1st Battery, 1st Brigade, Northern Division' etc. The 2nd and subsequent brigades were the artillery militia units (who temporarily lost their county designations), which already consisted of multiple batteries and had sometimes been referred to as 'regiments'. Artillery Volunteer Corps (AVCs) had been independent units comprising a variable number of batteries, sometimes grouped into administrative brigades, but since 1881 these had been consolidated into larger AVCs. They mostly retained their county titles. Although the militia and volunteers organised by county were affiliated to an appropriate territorial division, for the Regular RA the divisions simply represented recruiting districts – batteries could be serving anywhere in the British Empire and their only allegiance to brigade headquarters (HQ) was for the supply of drafts and recruits. The amount of militia artillery in each division had no relation to the coast defences that needed to be manned, but solely to the numbers that could be recruited within its boundaries. For example there were too few in Southern England where the principal coast fortress lay – there were none in London – and too many in Ireland. The Volunteer Force did not exist in Ireland. The organisation in 1882 was as follows:

=== 1. Northern Division ===
- HQ at Newcastle upon Tyne
- 1st Brigade
  - HQ at Sunderland
  - 1st–9th Btys (10th later added) and Depot Bty
- 2nd Brigade – formerly Durham Artillery Militia
- 3rd Brigade – formerly Northumberland Militia Artillery
- 4th Brigade – formerly Yorkshire Artillery Militia
- Artillery Volunteers: 1st, 2nd and 3rd Northumberland; 1st and 2nd East Riding; 1st North Riding; 1st Berwick-on-Tweed; 1st Cumberland; 1st, 2nd, 3rd and 4th Durham; 1st, 2nd and 4th West Riding; 1st Newcastle-upon-Tyne

=== 2. Lancashire Division ===
- HQ at Liverpool
- 1st Brigade
  - HQ at Liverpool
  - 1st– 8th Btys (9th–10th later added) and Depot Bty
- 2nd Brigade – formerly Royal Lancashire Militia Artillery
- Artillery Volunteers: 1st, 2nd, 3rd, 4th, 5th, 6th, 7th and 8th Lancashire; 1st Cheshire and Carnarvonshire; 1st Shropshire and Staffordshire

=== 3. Eastern Division ===
- HQ at Great Yarmouth
- 1st Brigade
  - HQ at Colchester
  - 1st–9th Btys and Depot Bty
- Prince of Wales's 2nd Brigade – formerly Prince of Wales's Own Norfolk Artillery Militia
- 3rd Brigade – formerly Suffolk Artillery Militia
- Artillery Volunteers: 1st Norfolk; 1st Essex; 1st Lincolnshire

=== 4. Cinque Ports Division ===
- HQ at Dover
- 1st Brigade
  - HQ at Dover
  - 1st–9th Btys and Depot Bty
- 2nd Brigade – formerly Kent Militia Artillery
- 3rd Brigade – formerly Royal Sussex Militia Artillery
- 1st Volunteer (Sussex) Brigade
- 2nd Volunteer (Sussex) Brigade
- 3rd Volunteer (Kent) Brigade
- 4th Volunteer (Cinque Ports) Brigade

=== 5. London Division ===
- HQ at Royal Artillery Barracks, Woolwich
- 1st Brigade
  - HQ at Woolwich]
  - 1st– 8th Btys (9th–10th later added) and Depot Bty
- Artillery Volunteers: 2nd and 3rd Kent; 2nd and 3rd Middlesex; 1st London

=== 6. Southern Division ===
- HQ at Portsmouth
- 1st Brigade
  - HQ at Fort Rowner, Gosport
  - 1st–9th Btys (10th later added) and Depot Bty
- 2nd Brigade – formerly Hampshire Artillery Militia
- 3rd Brigade – formerly Isle of Wight Artillery Militia
- 1st Hampshire Artillery Volunteers

=== 7. Western Division ===
- HQ at Plymouth
- 1st Brigade
  - HQ at Devonport
  - 1st–9th Btys (10th later added) and Depot Bty
- 2nd Brigade – formerly Cornwall and Devon Miners Artillery Militia
- 3rd Brigade – formerly Devon Artillery Militia
- Artillery Volunteers: 1st and 2nd Devonshire; 1st Cornwall

=== 8. Scottish Division ===
- HQ at Leith
- 1st Brigade
  - HQ at Leith
  - 1st–9th Btys (10th later added) and Depot Bty
- 2nd Brigade – formerly Haddington, Berwick, Linlithgow and Peebles Artillery Militia
- 3rd Brigade – formerly Duke of Edinburgh's Own Edinburgh Artillery
- 4th Brigade – formerly Fifeshire Artillery Militia
- 5th Brigade – formerly Forfar and Kincardine Artillery
- 6th Brigade – formerly Argyll and Bute Artillery Militia
- Artillery Volunteers: 1st Edinburgh; 1st Midlothian; 1st Banffshire; 1st Forfarshire; 1st Renfrew & Dumbarton; 1st Fife; 1st Haddington; 1st Lanarkshire; 1st Ayrshire & Galloway; 1st Argyll & Bute; 1st Caithness; 1st Aberdeenshire; 1st Berwickshire; 1st Inverness-shire; 1st Orkney

=== 9. Welsh Division ===
- HQ at Pembroke Dock
- 1st Brigade
  - HQ at Newport
  - 1st–8th Btys (9th later added) and Depot Bty
- 2nd Brigade – formerly Royal Glamorgan Artillery Militia
- 3rd Brigade – formerly Royal Carmarthen Artillery
- 4th Brigade – formerly Royal Pembroke Artillery
- 5th Brigade – formerly Royal Cardigan Artillery
- Artillery Volunteers: 1st Glamorganshire; 1st Gloucestershire; 1st Pembrokeshire; 1st Worcestershire

=== 10. North Irish Division ===
- HQ at Carrickfergus
- 1st Brigade
  - HQ at Derry
  - 1st–9th Btys and Depot Bty
- 2nd Brigade – formerly Antrim Artillery
- 3rd Brigade – formerly Donegal Artillery
- 4th Brigade – formerly Dublin City Artillery Militia
- 5th Brigade – formerly Galway Artillery Militia
- 6th Brigade – formerly Mid-Ulster Artillery Militia
- 7th Brigade – formerly Wicklow Artillery Militia
- 8th Brigade – formerly Sligo Artillery Militia
- 9th Brigade – formerly Londonderry Artillery Militia

=== 11. South Irish Division ===
- HQ at Cork
- 1st Brigade
  - HQ at Kinsale
  - 1st–9th Btys and Depot Bty
- 2nd Brigade – formerly West Cork Artillery Militia
- 3rd Brigade – formerly Cork City Artillery Militia
- 4th Brigade – formerly Limerick City Artillery Militia
- 5th Brigade – formerly South Tipperary Artillery Militia
- 6th Brigade – formerly Waterford Artillery Militia
- 7th Brigade – formerly 3rd Battalion, Royal Munster Fusiliers

== 1889–1902 ==
On 1 July 1889 the garrison artillery was reorganised again into three large territorial divisions of garrison artillery and one of mountain artillery. The names of the territorial divisions seemed arbitrary, with the Scottish units being grouped in the South Division, for example, but this related to where the need for coastal artillery was greatest, rather than where the units recruited. The artillery militia units regained their county designations, as did those volunteer units that had adopted brigade titles. After 1889 all were intended to include '(----ern Division, Royal Artillery)' after their title, but many of the volunteers did not use them. From 1 August 1891 garrison artillery batteries were termed companies (unless they were equipped with specific guns, such as mountain batteries or position batteries), and some were grouped into double companies at this time before reverting to their previous numbers in March 1894.

=== Eastern Division ===
- HQ at Dover

==== Regulars ====
- 1st–32nd Companies, Depot and Sub-depot

==== Militia ====
- Kent Artillery (Eastern Division)
- Prince of Wales's Own Norfolk Artillery (Eastern Division)
- Suffolk Artillery (Eastern Division)
- Sussex Artillery (Eastern Division)

==== Volunteers ====
1st and 2nd Sussex; 1st Norfolk; 1st, 2nd and 3rd Kent; 1st Essex; 1st and 2nd Cinque Ports; 2nd and 3rd Middlesex; 1st London; 1st Suffolk & Harwich

=== Southern Division ===
- HQ at Portsmouth

==== Regulars ====
- 1st–42nd Companies, Depot and two Sub-depots

==== Militia ====
- Antrim Artillery (Southern Division)
- Haddington Artillery (Southern Division)
- West Cork Artillery (Southern Division)
- Cork City Artillery (Southern Division)
- Donegal Artillery (Southern Division)
- Dublin City Artillery(Southern Division)
- Duke of Edinburgh's Own Edinburgh Artillery (Southern Division)
- Fife Artillery (Southern Division)
- Forfar & Kincardine Artillery (Southern Division)
- Hampshire Artillery (Southern Division)
- Duke of Connaught's Own Isle of Wight Artillery (Southern Division)
- Lancashire Artillery (Southern Division)
- Limerick City Artillery (Southern Division)
- Mid-Ulster Artillery (Southern Division)
- Tipperary Artillery (Southern Division)
- Waterford Artillery (Southern Division)
- Argyll & Bute Artillery (Southern Division)
- Wicklow Artillery (Southern Division)
- Duke of Connaught's Own Sligo Artillery (Southern Division)
- Londonderry Artillery (Southern Division)
- Clare Artillery (Southern Division)

==== Volunteers ====
1st and 2nd Hampshire; 1st Edinburgh; 1st Midlothian; 1st Banffshire; 1st Forfarshire; 1st, 2nd, 3rd, 4th, 5th, 6th, 7th, 8th and 9th Lancashire; 1st Renfrew & Dumbarton; 1st and 2nd Dorsetshire; 1st Fife; 1st Haddington; 1st Lanarkshire; 1st Ayrshire & Galloway; 1st Argyll & Bute; 1st Cheshire & Carnarvonshire; 1st Caithness; 1st Aberdeenshire; 1st Berwickshire; 1st Inverness-shire; 1st Cumberland; 1st Orkney; 1st Shropshire & Staffordshire; 1st Worcestershire

=== Western Division ===
- HQ at Plymouth

==== Regulars ====
- 1st–31st Companies, Depot and two Sub-depots

==== Militia ====
- Cornwall & Devon Miners Artillery (Western Division)
- Devon Artillery (Western Division)
- Durham Artillery (Western Division)
- Glamorgan Artillery (Western Division)
- Northumberland Artillery (Western Division)
- Carmarthen Artillery (Western Division)
- Pembroke Artillery (Western Division)
- Yorkshire Artillery (Western Division)
- Cardigan Artillery (Western Division)

==== Volunteers ====
Tynemouth; 1st and 2nd Northumberland; 1st and 2nd Devonshire; 1st Cornwall; 1st and 2nd Glamorganshire; 1st and 2nd Yorkshire (East Riding); 1st Gloucestershire; 1st Yorkshire (North Riding); 1st Lincolnshire; 1st Berwick-on-Tweed; 1st, 2nd, 3rd and 4th Durham; 1st, 2nd and 4th Yorkshire (West Riding); 1st Newcastle upon Tyne; 1st Monmouthshire

=== Mountain Division ===
When the territorial divisions were reorganised on 1 July 1889, one field battery in South Africa and nine garrison artillery batteries – one in Monmouthshire, the remainder in India – were converted into mountain batteries to constitute a new mountain artillery division. On 1 June 1899 this was redesignated the Mountain Division, RGA, and the batteries became '1st Mountain Bty, RGA', etc.

- 1st–10th Mountain Btys

== Reorganisation ==
In 1899 the Royal Artillery was divided into two distinct branches, field and garrison. The field branch included the Royal Horse Artillery (RHA) and the newly-named Royal Field Artillery (RFA). The garrison branch was named the Royal Garrison Artillery (RGA) and included coast defence, position, heavy, siege and mountain artillery. The RGA retained the divisions until they were scrapped on 1 January 1902, at which point the Regular RGA companies were numbered in a single sequence and the militia and volunteer units were designated '--- shire RGA (M)' or '(V)' as appropriate.
