= Northern Division, Royal Artillery =

Northern Division, RA
- Cap Badge of the Royal Regiment of Artillery
- Active: 4 April 1882–1 July 1889
- Country: United Kingdom
- Branch: British Army
- Type: Administrative division
- Part of: Royal Artillery
- Garrison/HQ: Newcastle upon Tyne

The Northern Division, Royal Artillery, was an administrative grouping of garrison units of the Royal Artillery, Artillery Militia and Artillery Volunteers within the British Army's Northern District from 1882 to 1889.

== Organisation ==
Under General Order 72 of 4 April 1882 the Royal Artillery (RA) broke up its existing administrative brigades (Note: In RA terminology, a 'brigade' was a group of independent batteries grouped together for administrative rather than tactical purposes, the officer in command being usually a lieutenant-colonel rather than a brigadier-general or major-general, the ranks usually associated with command of an infantry or cavalry brigade.) of garrison artillery (7th–11th Brigades, RA) and assigned the individual batteries to 11 new territorial divisions. These divisions were purely administrative and recruiting organisations, not field formations. Most were formed within the existing military districts into which the United Kingdom was divided, and for the first time associated the part-time Artillery Militia with the regulars. Shortly afterwards the Artillery Volunteers were also added to the territorial divisions. The Regular Army batteries were grouped into one brigade, usually of nine sequentially-numbered batteries and a depot battery. For these units the divisions represented recruiting districts – batteries could be serving anywhere in the British Empire and their only connection to brigade headquarters (HQ) was for the supply of drafts and recruits. The artillery militia units (sometimes referred to as regiments) already comprised a number of batteries, and were redesignated as brigades, losing their county titles in the process. The artillery volunteers, which had previously consisted of numerous independent Artillery Volunteer Corps (AVC) of various sizes, sometimes grouped into administrative brigades, had been consolidated into larger AVCs in 1881, which were now affiliated to the appropriate territorial division.

== Composition ==
Northern Division, RA, listed as first in order of precedence, was organised within Northern District with the following composition:

- Headquarters (HQ) at Newcastle upon Tyne
- 1st Brigade
  - HQ at Sunderland
  - 1st (Mountain) Bty at Weymouth – formerly 1st Bty, 7th Bde
  - 2nd Bty at Dover – formerly 2nd Bty, 7th Bde
  - 3rd Bty at Dover – formerly 3rd Bty, 7th Bde
  - 4th Bty at Tilbury Fort – formerly 20th Bty, 9th Bde
  - 5th Bty at Bermuda – formerly 15th Bty, 7th Bde
  - 6th Bty at Bermuda – formerly 16th Bty, 7th Bde
  - 7th Bty at Khyra Gully – formerly 1st Bty, 8th Bde
  - 8th Bty at Campbellpore – formerly 2nd Bty, 8th Bde
  - 9th (Mountain) Bty at Murree Hills– formerly 6th Bty, 8th Bde
  - 10th Bty – new Bty formed 1886
  - Depot Bty at Newcastle upon Tyne – formerly 13th Bty 2nd Bde
- 2nd Brigade at Hartlepool – formerly Durham Artillery Militia (6 btys)
- 3rd Brigade at Berwick-upon-Tweed – formerly Northumberland Militia Artillery (6 btys)
- 4th Brigade at Scarborough – formerly Yorkshire Artillery Militia (6 btys)
- 1st (Northumberland and Sunderland) Northumberland Artillery Volunteers at Newcastle upon Tyne
- 2nd (The Percy) Northumberland Artillery Volunteers at Alnwick
- 3rd (The Tynemouth) Northumberland Artillery Volunteers at Tynemouth
- 1st East Riding Artillery Volunteers at Scarborough
- 2nd East Riding Artillery Volunteers at Hull
- 1st North Riding Artillery Volunteers at Middlesbrough
- 1st Berwick-on-Tweed Artillery Volunteers at Berwick-upon-Tweed
- 1st Cumberland Artillery Volunteers at Carlisle
- 1st Durham Artillery Volunteers at Hartlepool – independent from 1st Northumberland 1887
- 2nd (Seaham) Durham Artillery Volunteers at Seaham
- 3rd Durham Artillery Volunteers at South Shields
- 4th Durham Artillery Volunteers at West Hartlepool
- 1st West Riding Artillery Volunteers at Leeds
- 2nd West Riding Artillery Volunteers at Bradford
- 4th (Sheffield) West Riding Artillery Volunteers at Sheffield
- 1st Newcastle-upon-Tyne Artillery Volunteers at Newcastle upon Tyne

== Disbandment ==
In 1889 the garrison artillery was reorganised again into three large divisions of garrison artillery and one of mountain artillery. Although the names of the garrison divisions were still territorial (Eastern, Southern and Western) the assignment of units to them was geographically arbitrary, with the militia and volunteer units formerly in Northern Division being grouped in the Southern and Western Divisions (where there were the most coast defences to be manned in time of war), while the regular batteries were distributed across all four divisions and completely renumbered.

== See also ==
- Royal Garrison Artillery
- List of Royal Artillery Divisions 1882–1902
- Eastern Division, Royal Artillery
- Southern Division, Royal Artillery
- Western Division, Royal Artillery
- Mountain Division, Royal Artillery
