= Mountain Division, Royal Artillery =

Mountain Division, RA
- Cap Badge of the Royal Regiment of Artillery
- Active: 1 July 1889–1920
- Country: United Kingdom
- Branch: British Army
- Type: Administrative division
- Part of: Royal Artillery

The Mountain Division, Royal Artillery, was an administrative grouping of mountain artillery units of the Royal Artillery from 1889. It continued as a distinct branch of the Royal Garrison Artillery until World War I.

== Organisation ==
Since 1882 the garrison artillery units of the Royal Artillery (Regular, Militia and Volunteers) had been grouped into 11 territorial 'divisions' based on recruiting area rather than function. On 1 July 1889 these were reorganised into three larger divisions, but at the same time the five existing mountain batteries, together with five other batteries (four garrison and one field) newly converted to the role, were grouped into a separate Mountain Division. While garrison batteries were redesignated 'companies' from 1 August 1891 (indicating that they could be assigned to any permanent gun battery), the specialist mountain units, who were issued their own guns, remained 'batteries'. The Mountain Division consisted only of Regular RA units: no militia or volunteer units were equipped as mountain artillery. There were also a number of mountain batteries in India officered by the RA, but these were on the establishments of the Indian Armies. Unlike the territorial divisions, the Mountain Division had no defined headquarters, but a depot was established at Newport, Monmouthshire.

== Composition ==
Mountain Division, RA, comprised the following batteries:

- 1st Bty at Rawalpindi – transferred from 2nd (Mountain) Bty, 1st Bde, Scottish Division
- 2nd Bty at Rawalpindi – transferred from 2nd (Mountain) Bty, 1st Bde, Cinque Ports Division
- 3rd Bty at Darjeeling – transferred from 9th (Mountain) Bty, 1st Bde, Northern Division
- 4th Bty in Natal – converted from H Bty, 4th Brigade, RA
- 5th Bty at Jutogh – transferred from 9th (Mountain) Bty, 1st Bde, Cinque Ports Division
- 6th Bty at Rawalpindi – converted from 3rd Bty, 1st Bde, South Irish Division
- 7th Bty at Quetta – converted from 1st Bty, 1st Bde, Northern Division
- 8th Bty at Jutogh – transferred from 2nd (Mountain) Bty, 1st Bde, London Division
- 9th Bty at Rawalpindi – converted from 1st Bty, 1st Bde, Eastern Division
- 10th Bty at Newport – converted from 2nd Bty, 1st Bde, South Irish Division

== Reorganisation ==
In 1899 the Royal Artillery was divided into two distinct branches, field and garrison. The field branch included the Royal Horse Artillery (RHA) and the newly-named Royal Field Artillery (RFA). The garrison branch was named the Royal Garrison Artillery (RGA) and included coast defence, position, heavy, siege and mountain artillery. The RGA temporarily retained the divisional structure with the division being redesignated the Mountain Division, RGA, and the batteries becoming '1st Mountain Bty, RGA', etc. While the territorial divisions were scrapped on 31 December 1901, the term 'Mountain Division' continued as the title of a distinct branch of the RGA until World War I.

In 1901 the batteries were distributed as follows:

- 1st Bty at Bara Gali
- 2nd Bty at Khaira Gali
- 3rd Bty at Kalabagh
- 4th Bty in South Africa
- 5th Bty at Jutogh
- 6th Bty at Jutogh
- 7th Bty at Quetta
- 8th Bty at Darjeeling
- 9th Bty at Mandalay
- 10th Bty in South Africa – converted into 107 (Siege Train) Company, RGA, 1903
- Depot at Newport

Thereafter until World War I eight companies rotated around the same mountain stations in India with one being stationed at Cairo. With the formation of the part-time Territorial Force (TF) in 1908 the 1st Argyll & Bute RGA (Volunteers) was converted into 4th Highland (Mountain) Brigade, Royal Garrison Artillery, attached to the Highland Division as the TF's only mountain artillery unit.

Postwar, the RGA adopted the regiment-sized 'brigades' employed by the RHA and RFA and the mountain batteries were organised into a number of 'Pack Brigades'.
