= South Irish Division, Royal Artillery =

South Irish Division, RA
- Cap Badge of the Royal Regiment of Artillery
- Active: 4 April 1882–1 July 1889
- Country: United Kingdom
- Branch: British Army
- Type: Administrative division
- Part of: Royal Artillery
- Garrison/HQ: Cork

The South Irish Division, Royal Artillery, was an administrative grouping of garrison units of the Royal Artillery and Artillery Militia in Ireland from 1882 to 1889.

== Organisation ==
Under General Order 72 of 4 April 1882 the Royal Artillery (RA) broke up its existing administrative brigades (Note: In RA terminology, a 'brigade' was a group of independent batteries grouped together for administrative rather than tactical purposes, the officer in command being usually a lieutenant-colonel rather than a brigadier-general or major-general, the ranks usually associated with command of an infantry or cavalry brigade.) of garrison artillery (7th–11th Brigades, RA) and assigned the individual batteries to 11 new territorial divisions. These divisions were purely administrative and recruiting organisations, not field formations. For the first time the part-time Artillery Militia were associated with the regulars. The Regular Army batteries were grouped into one brigade, usually of nine sequentially-numbered batteries and a depot battery. For these units the divisions represented recruiting districts – batteries could be serving anywhere in the British Empire and their only connection to brigade headquarters (HQ) was for the supply of drafts and recruits. The artillery militia units (sometimes referred to as regiments) already comprised a number of batteries, and were redesignated as brigades, losing their county titles in the process.

== Composition ==
South Irish Division, RA, listed as 11th in order of precedence, was organised with the following composition:

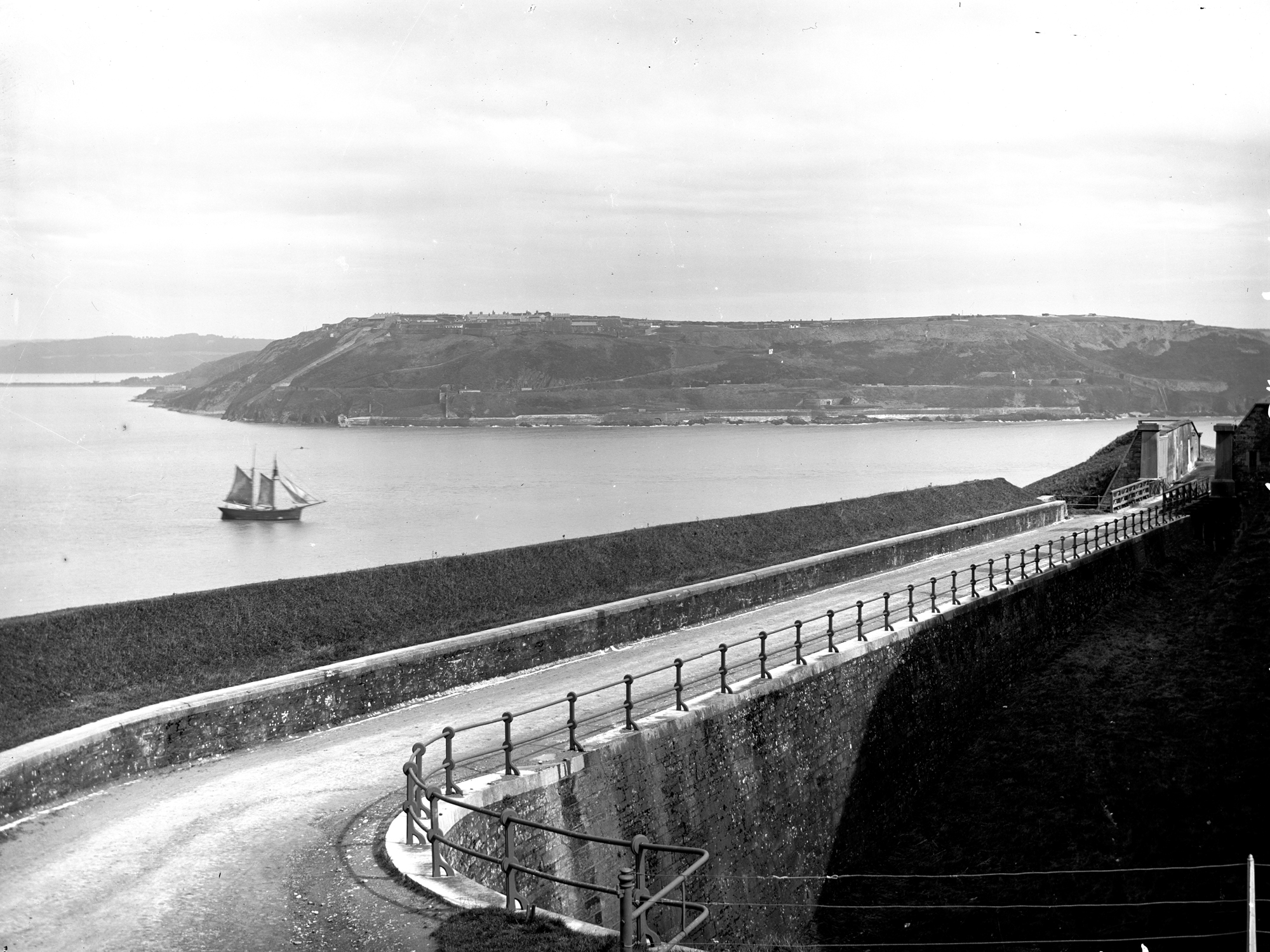
Fort Carlisle seen from Camden Fort, both being parts of the Cork Harbour defences.

- HQ at Cork
- 1st Brigade
  - HQ at Kinsale
  - 1st Bty at Mount Wise, Devonport – formerly 12th Bty, 10th Bde
  - 2nd Bty at Plymouth – formerly 17th Bty, 11th Bde
  - 3rd Bty at Devonport – formerly 18th Bty, 11th Bde
  - 4th Bty at Portsmouth – formerly 11th Bty, 8th Bde
  - 5th Bty at Jutogh – formerly 11th Bty, 9th Bde
  - 6th Bty at Thayetmyo – formerly 11th Bty, 11th Bde
  - 7th Bty at Malta – formerly 2nd Bty, 11th Bde
  - 8th Bty at Malta – formerly 3rd Bty, 11th Bde
  - 9th Bty at Malta – formerly 4th Bty, 11th Bde
  - Depot Bty at Kinsale – formerly Depot Bty, 10th Bde
- 2nd Brigade at Macroom – formerly West Cork Artillery Militia (6 btys)
- 3rd Brigade at Cork – formerly Royal Cork City Artillery Militia (4 btys)
- 4th Brigade at Limerick – formerly Limerick City Artillery Militia (6 btys)
- 5th Brigade at Clonmel – formerly South Tipperary Artillery Militia (8 btys)
- 6th Brigade at Waterford – formerly Waterford Artillery Militia (8 btys)
- 7th Brigade at Ennis – formerly 3rd Battalion, Royal Munster Fusiliers (8 btys)

== Disbandment ==
On 1 July 1889 the garrison artillery was reorganised again into three large territorial divisions of garrison artillery (Eastern, Southern and Western) and one of mountain artillery. The assignment of units to them seemed geographically arbitrary, with all the Irish militia units being grouped in the Southern Division, for example, but this related to where the need for coastal artillery was greatest, rather than where the units recruited. The regular batteries were distributed across most of the divisions and completely renumbered.

== See also ==
- Royal Garrison Artillery
- List of Royal Artillery Divisions 1882–1902
- North Irish Division, Royal Artillery
- Southern Division, Royal Artillery
