= Cinque Ports Division, Royal Artillery =

Cinque Ports Division, RA
- Cap Badge of the Royal Regiment of Artillery
- Active: 4 April 1882–1 July 1889
- Country: United Kingdom
- Branch: British Army
- Type: Administrative division
- Part of: Royal Artillery
- Garrison/HQ: Dover

The Cinque Ports Division, Royal Artillery was an administrative grouping of garrison units of the Royal Artillery, Artillery Militia and Artillery Volunteers within the British Army's South Eastern District from 1882 to 1889.

== Organisation ==
Under General Order 72 of 4 April 1882 the Royal Artillery (RA) broke up its existing administrative brigades (Note: In RA terminology, a 'brigade' was a group of independent batteries grouped together for administrative rather than tactical purposes, the officer in command being usually a lieutenant-colonel rather than a brigadier-general or major-general, the ranks usually associated with command of an infantry or cavalry brigade.) of garrison artillery (7th–11th Brigades, RA) and assigned the individual batteries to 11 new territorial divisions. These divisions were purely administrative and recruiting organisations, not field formations. Most were formed within the existing military districts into which the United Kingdom was divided, and for the first time associated the part-time Artillery Militia with the regulars. Shortly afterwards the Artillery Volunteers were also added to the territorial divisions. The Regular Army batteries were grouped into one brigade, usually of nine sequentially-numbered batteries and a depot battery. For these units the divisions represented recruiting districts – batteries could be serving anywhere in the British Empire and their only connection to brigade headquarters (HQ) was for the supply of drafts and recruits. The artillery militia units (sometimes referred to as regiments) already comprised a number of batteries, and were redesignated as brigades, losing their county titles in the process. The artillery volunteers, which had previously consisted of numerous independent Artillery Volunteer Corps (AVC) of various sizes, sometimes grouped into administrative brigades, had been consolidated into larger AVCs in 1881, which were now affiliated to the appropriate territorial division.

== Composition ==
Cinque Ports Division, RA, listed as fourth in order of precedence, was organised within the Cinque Ports coastal area of South Eastern District with the following composition:

- Headquarters (HQ) at Dover
- 1st Brigade
  - HQ at Dover
  - 1st Bty at Guernsey – formerly 13th Bty, 11th Bde
  - 2nd (Mountain) Bty at Alderney – formerly 12th Bty, 11th Bde
  - 3rd Bty at Dover – formerly 10th Bty, 8th Bde
  - 4th Bty at Dover – formerly 18th Bty, 7th Bde
  - 5th Bty at Jamaica – formerly 17th Bty, 7th Bde
  - 6th Bty at Barbados– formerly 6th Bty, 9th Bde
  - 7th Bty at Quetta – formerly 6th Bty, 10th Bde
  - 8th Bty at Bombay – formerly 7th Bty, 10th Bde
  - 9th (Mountain) Bty at Khandala – formerly 5th Bty, 8th Bde
  - Depot Bty – formerly Depot Bty, 9th Bde
- 2nd Brigade at Dover – formerly Kent Militia Artillery (6 btys)
- 3rd Brigade at Lewes – formerly Royal Sussex Militia Artillery (5 btys)
- 1st Sussex Artillery Volunteers at Brighton
- 2nd Sussex Artillery Volunteers at Eastbourne – independent from 1st Sussex 1886
- 1st Kent Artillery Volunteers at Gravesend
- 1st Cinque Ports Artillery Volunteers at Dover

Under General Order 77 of June 1887 the AVCs were redesignated within the CP Division:

- 1st Volunteer (Sussex) Brigade
- 2nd Volunteer (Sussex) Brigade
- 3rd Volunteer (Kent) Brigade
- 4th Volunteer (Cinque Ports) Brigade

== Disbandment ==
In 1889 the garrison artillery was reorganised again into three large divisions of garrison artillery (Eastern, Southern and Western) and one of mountain artillery. The militia and volunteer units formerly in CP Division were reassigned to the Eastern Division while the regular batteries were distributed across all four divisions and completely renumbered.

== See also ==
- Royal Garrison Artillery
- List of Royal Artillery Divisions 1882–1902
- Eastern Division, Royal Artillery
- Southern Division, Royal Artillery
- Western Division, Royal Artillery
- Mountain Division, Royal Artillery
