= London Division, Royal Artillery =

London Division, RA
- Cap Badge of the Royal Regiment of Artillery
- Active: 4 April 1882–1 July 1889
- Country: United Kingdom
- Branch: British Army
- Type: Administrative division
- Part of: Royal Artillery
- Garrison/HQ: Royal Artillery Barracks, Woolwich

The London Division, Royal Artillery, was an administrative grouping of garrison units of the Royal Artillery and Artillery Volunteers within the British Army's Home and Woolwich Districts from 1882 to 1889.

== Organisation ==
Under General Order 72 of 4 April 1882 the Royal Artillery (RA) broke up its existing administrative brigades (Note: In RA terminology, a 'brigade' was a group of independent batteries grouped together for administrative rather than tactical purposes, the officer in command being usually a lieutenant-colonel rather than a brigadier-general or major-general, the ranks usually associated with command of an infantry or cavalry brigade.) of garrison artillery (7th–11th Brigades, RA) and assigned the individual batteries to 11 new territorial divisions. These divisions were purely administrative and recruiting organisations, not field formations. Most were formed within the existing military districts into which the United Kingdom was divided, and for the first time associated the auxiliary forces with the regulars. The Regular Army batteries were grouped into one brigade, usually of nine sequentially-numbered batteries and a depot battery. For these units the divisions represented recruiting districts – batteries could be serving anywhere in the British Empire and their only connection to brigade headquarters (HQ) was for the supply of drafts and recruits. The artillery volunteers, which had previously consisted of numerous independent Artillery Volunteer Corps (AVC) of various sizes, sometimes grouped into administrative brigades, had been consolidated into larger AVCs in 1881, which were now affiliated to the appropriate territorial division.

== Composition ==
London Division, RA, listed as fifth in order of precedence, was organised covering Home and Woolwich Districts with the following composition:

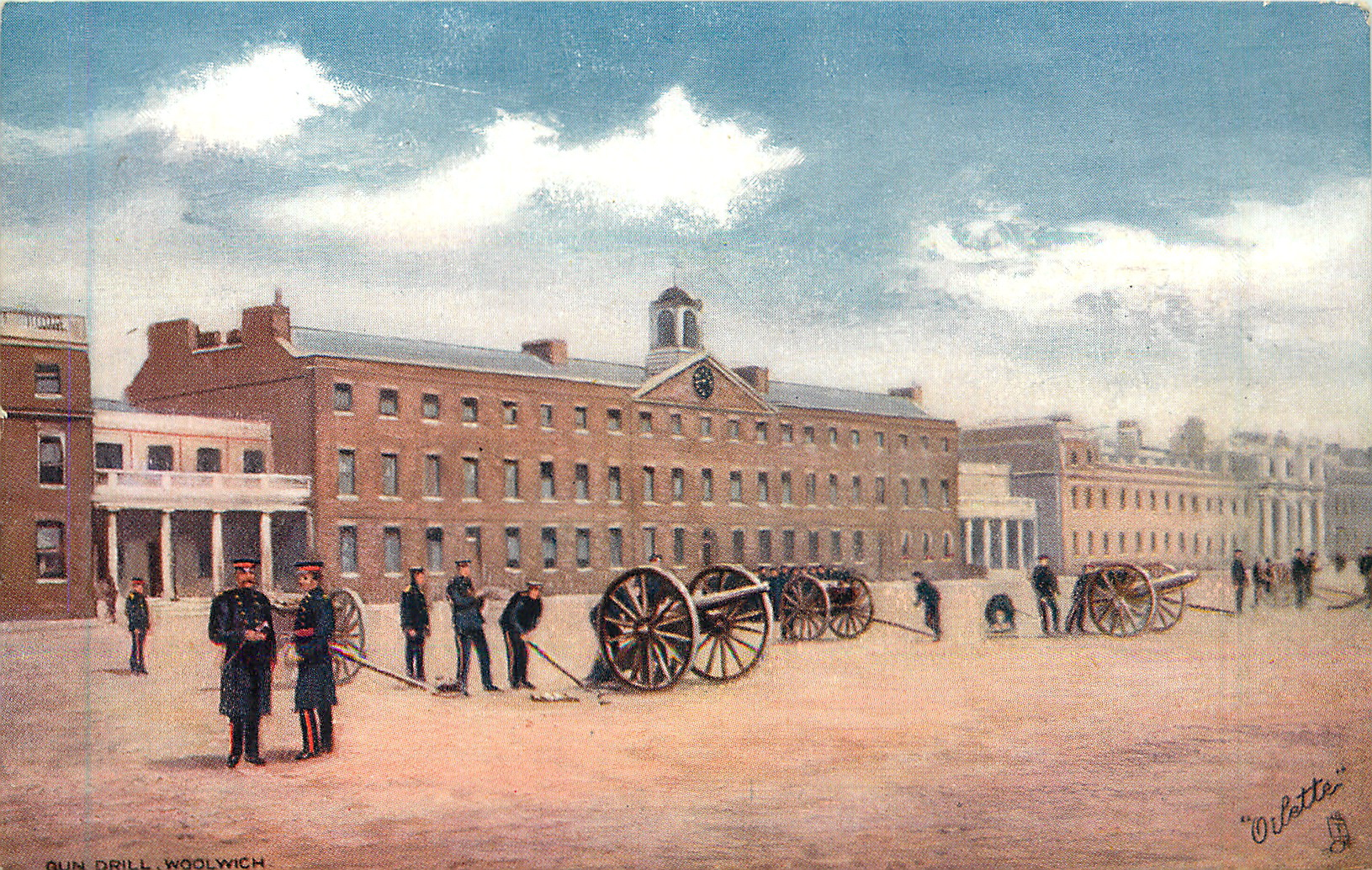
The Royal Artillery Barracks, Woolwich at the end of the 19th century.

- Headquarters (HQ) at Royal Artillery Barracks, Woolwich
- 1st Brigade
  - HQ at Woolwich
  - 1st Bty at Portsmouth – formerly 8th Bty, 10 Bde
  - 2nd Bty at Gosport – formerly 16th Bty, 8th Bde
  - 3rd Bty at Shoeburyness – formerly 17th Bty, 8th Bde
  - 4th Bty at Malta – formerly 4th Bty, 10th Bde
  - 5th Bty at Malta – formerly 5th Bty, 10th Bde
  - 6th Bty at Malta – formerly 5th Bty, 9th Bde
  - 7th Bty at Aden – formerly 13th Bty, 9th Bde
  - 8th Bty at Delhi – formerly 7th Bty, 11th Bde
  - 9th Bty – new Bty formed 1885
  - 10th Bty – new Bty formed 1887
  - Depot Bty at Woolwich – formerly Depot Bty, 1st Bde
- 2nd Kent Artillery Volunteers at Plumstead
- 3rd Kent Artillery Volunteers (Royal Arsenal) at Woolwich
- 2nd Middlesex Artillery Volunteers at Custom House, London
- 3rd Middlesex Artillery Volunteers at Regent Street, London
- 1st (City of London) London Artillery Volunteers at City of London

== Disbandment ==
In 1889 the garrison artillery was reorganised again into three large divisions of garrison artillery (Eastern, Southern and Western) and one of mountain artillery. The volunteer units formerly in London Division were reassigned to the Eastern Division while the regular batteries were distributed across all four divisions and completely renumbered.

== See also ==
- Royal Garrison Artillery
- List of Royal Artillery Divisions 1882–1902
- Eastern Division, Royal Artillery
- Southern Division, Royal Artillery
- Western Division, Royal Artillery
- Mountain Division, Royal Artillery
