= 2nd Middlesex Artillery Volunteers =

2nd Middlesex Artillery Volunteers (Custom House) 3rd London Brigade, RFA
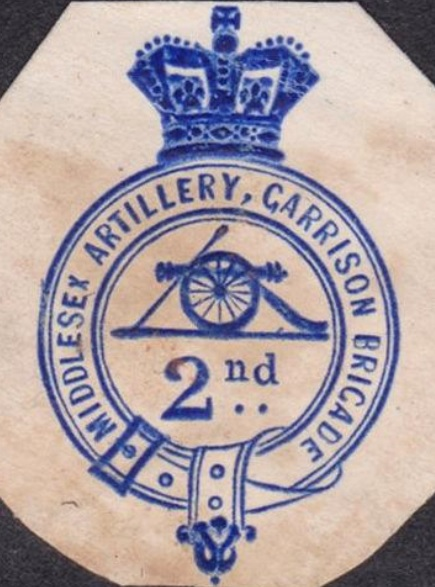
- Letterhead and crest of the 2nd Middlesex Artillery Volunteers, c1895
- Active: 1861–1919
- Country: United Kingdom
- Branch: Territorial Force
- Type: Artillery Brigade
- Role: Garrison artillery Field artillery
- Motto: Nulli Secundus ('Second to None')
- Engagements: Somme Offensive: Gommecourt; Ginchy; Flers-Courcelette; Transloy Ridges; Vimy Ridge; Messines; Ypres Offensive: Menin Road; Polygon Wood; German spring offensive: Somme Crossings; Rosières; Scarpe; Hundred Days Offensive: Drocourt-Quéant Line; Canal du Nord; Selle; Valenciennes

Commanders
- Colonel of the Regiment: Lt-Gen Sir Edward Bruce Hamley (1887–1893)
- Notable commanders: Sir William Palliser; Lord Arthur Hill

The 2nd Middlesex Artillery was a Volunteer unit of Britain's Royal Artillery. First raised in the Victorian era among Customs officers in the Port of London, it later became the 3rd London Brigade, Royal Field Artillery in the Territorial Force and saw action on the Western Front during World War I.

== Origins ==
The enthusiasm for the Volunteer movement following an invasion scare in 1859 saw the creation of many Rifle, Artillery and Engineer Volunteer units composed of part-time soldiers eager to supplement the Regular British Army in time of need. Often these were drawn from a single place of work. One such was the Custom House, City of London, whose employees working in the London docks formed both the 26th Middlesex Rifle Volunteer Corps (Customs & Excise) and a year later the 2nd Middlesex Artillery Volunteer Corps (Custom House). The first commissions to the 2nd Middlesex AVC were issued on 26 April 1861; initially, it was attached to the 26th Middlesex RVC.

Later, the artillery grew to six companies and became an independent unit, moving its HQ to the Artillery Barracks in Leonard Street, off London's City Road. The artillery inventor Sir William Palliser was appointed Lieutenant-colonel in 1875, and was succeeded by the politician Lord Arthur Hill. In 1883, 1884 and 1886, the 2nd Middlesex won the Queen's Prize at the annual National Artillery Association competition held at Shoeburyness.

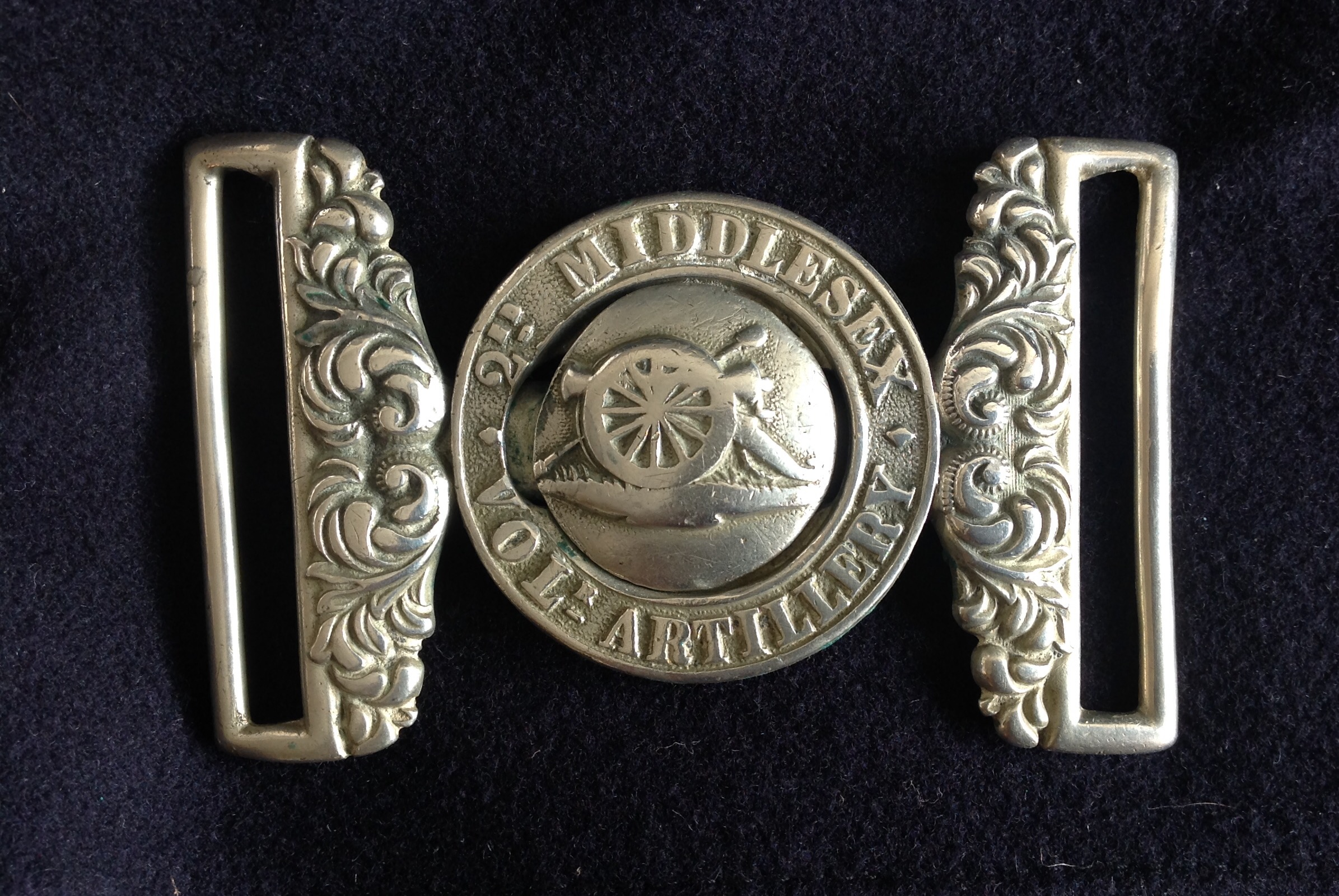
Waistbelt clasp of the 2nd Middlesex Volunteer Artillery, c1890

The 2nd Middlesex had been included in the London Division when the Royal Artillery (RA) adopted a territorial structure on 1 April 1882, but this was disbanded on 1 July 1889 and the unit was assigned to the Eastern Division. By 1893, the War Office Mobilisation Scheme had allocated the unit to the Thames defences.

As of 30 September 1894, the unit had the following organisation:

- HQ, Nos 1–7 Companies at Leonard Street and at the Tower of London
- No 8 Company at Sands End, Fulham

On 1 June 1899, the Royal Artillery was split into two branches, and the Artillery Volunteers were assigned to the Royal Garrison Artillery (RGA). The divisional organisation was abandoned on 1 January 1902 and the unit was re-titled 2nd Middlesex Royal Garrison Artillery (Volunteers), ranking 60th in order of precedence.

== Territorial Force ==
Under the Haldane Reforms, the former Volunteers were subsumed into the Territorial Force (TF) in 1908. The 2nd Middlesex RGA (V) was transferred to the Royal Field Artillery (RFA) and became 3rd County of London Brigaden (3rd London Bde) in the TF's 1st London Division on 1 May 1908 at City Road with the following organisation:

- 7th County of London Battery
- 8th County of London Battery
- 9th County of London Battery
- III London Brigade Ammunition Column

== World War I ==
=== Mobilisation and organisation ===
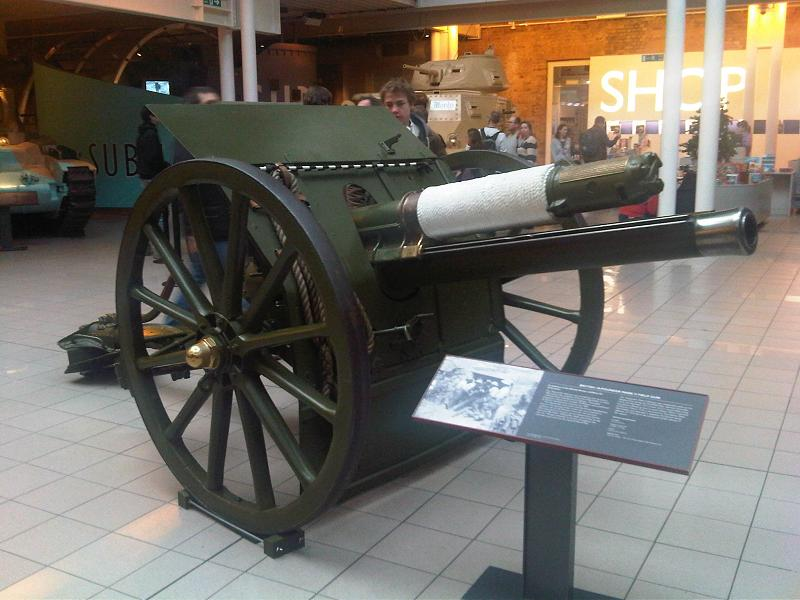
18-Pounder field gun preserved at the Imperial War Museum.

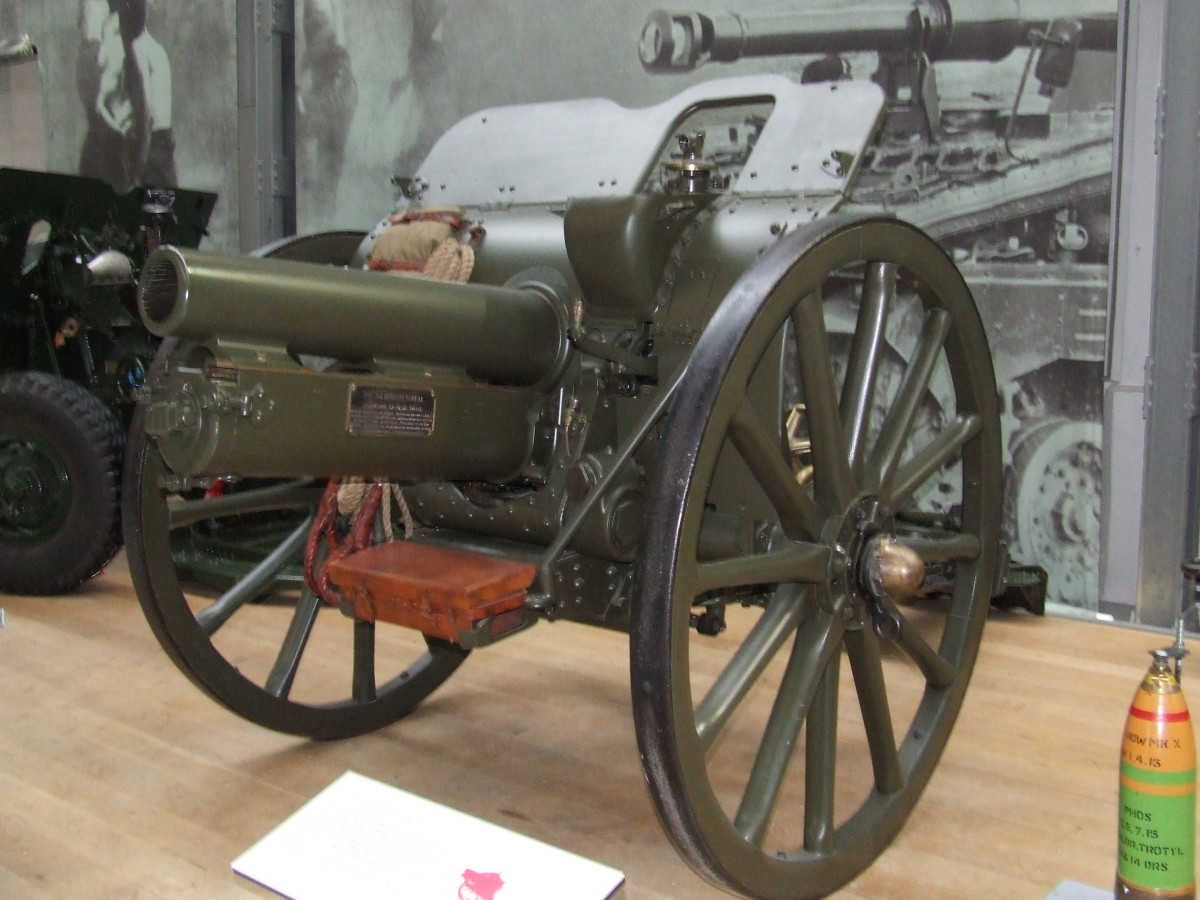
4.5-inch Howitzer at the Royal Artillery Museum.

Annual training for 1st London Division had just started when war was declared on 4 August 1914, and the III London Brigade promptly mustered at City Road for mobilisation. The infantry of the division were soon posted away to relieve Regular Army garrisons in the Mediterranean or to supplement the British Expeditionary Force on the Western Front. By January 1915, only the artillery and other support elements remained with the division, and these were attached to the 2nd Line TF division (2/1st London Division) that was being formed. Meanwhile, the artillery brigade formed its own 2nd line, the two units being designated 1/III and 2/III London Bdes.

=== 1/III London Brigade ===
In August 1915, the 36th (Ulster) Division was being readied for service. Its infantry were largely drawn from the Ulster Volunteers and had already received weapons training before the war; the artillery however were newly raised Londoners, and the drivers were still being taught to mount and dismount from wooden horses. The 1st London Divisional Artillery were therefore attached to the Ulster Division until its own gunners were ready for active service. The London field brigades were re-equipped with 18-pounder guns (four per battery) and accompanied the Ulster Division to France, 1/III London Bde landing at Le Havre on 5 October 1915. It was in the front line by the middle of the month.

In December, the Ulster Division's artillery arrived from England, and the 1st London Divisional Artillery was transferred to the 38th (Welsh) Division, which had also arrived in France minus its own artillery. 1/III London Bde served with the Welsh Division from 11 December 1915 to 1 January 1916, when it briefly joined IV Corps Artillery and then the 47th (1/2nd London) Division. By then, 1st London Division (now numbered 56th (1/1st London) Division) was being reformed in France and its divisional artillery was finally able to rejoin at the end of February 1916. The 1/III London Brigade was assigned to support 169th (3rd London) Brigade and went into billets at Bouret-sur-Canches.

On 16 April 1916, the brigade was increased to four batteries by the addition of R Battery, formed from sections of the 93rd and 109th Regular Batteries. 93rd Battery had been part of XVIII Bde RFA in the 3rd (Lahore) Division, remaining in France after the division went to Mesopotamia, while 109th Bty had been part of XXIII Bde RFA in 3rd Division since the beginning of the war

In May 1916, the TF artillery brigades were numbered in sequence with the Regular RFA: 1/III London became CCLXXXII Brigade (282 Bde) and the batteries were lettered A, B, C and D (R). Shortly afterwards, the brigade sent D (R) Bty to CCLXXIII (IV London (Howitzer) Bde) in exchange for a New Army howitzer battery raised in Camberwell that had come from 33rd Divisional Artillery; this became D (H) Bty, equipped with the QF 4.5-inch howitzer.

==== Gommecourt ====
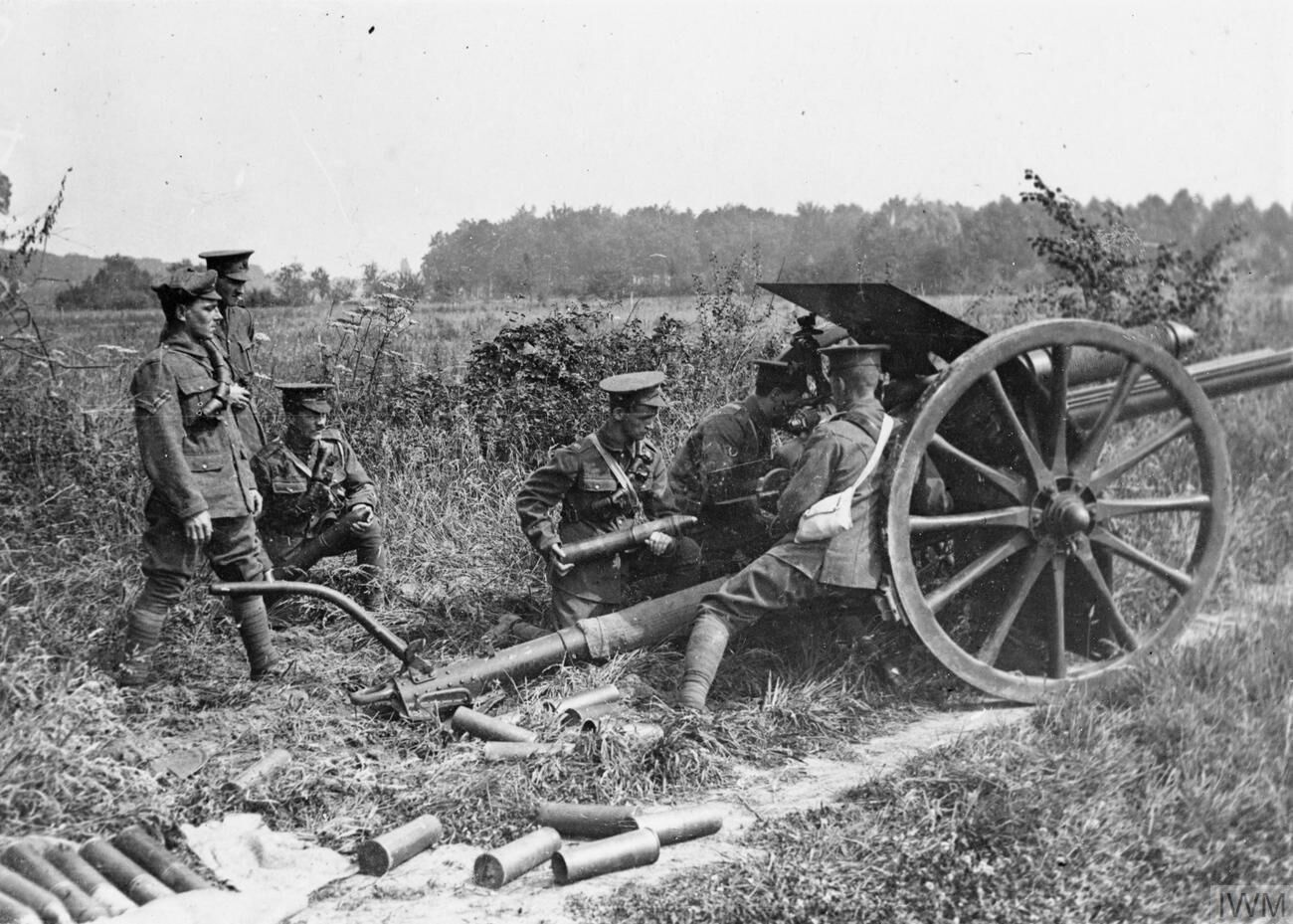
18-Pounder in action on the Somme, August 1916.

Throughout late June 1916, 56th Divisional Artillery was engaged in the preliminary bombardment for the division's attack on Gommecourt, an important diversion to the main British offensive (the Battle of the Somme) due to begin on 1 July. 56th Divisional Artillery was divided into three groups for this task: Northern, Southern and Wire-Cutting; the CO of CCLXXXII Bde, Lt-Col A.F. Prechtel, was placed in command of the wire-cutting group ('Peltart'), comprising five batteries of 18-pounders (A/CCLXXX and C/CCLXXXIII in addition to his own three) and one of 4.5 howitzers (D/CCLXXX, of which two howitzers were at the call of the counter-battery group). Two guns of C/CCLXXXIII were concealed in an orchard almost in the British front line. The Peltart group fired almost 24,500 rounds of mainly Shrapnel shell in the days before the attack. By 28 June the Barbed wire in front of the German first and second lines was reported to be satisfactorily cut, but German working parties continued to repair it at night.

The division's attack on 1 July (the Battle of Gommecourt) was a costly failure. The artillery observers watched the infantry cross No man's land, clear the German front-line trench and take the initial objectives, but German artillery retaliation and counter-attacks were intense, no reinforcements could cross No man's Land and no further progress could be made. The wire-cutting guns were now tasked with long-range fire into the enemy's rear areas, but the guns were worn out after the long bombardment, many were out of action with broken buffer springs, and their fire was ineffective. The division was pushed back into the German front-line trench and lost very heavily. Afterwards, its commander criticised the plan, especially the long-drawn-out artillery preparation, which allowed the enemy to prepare their response.

On the night of 13 July, the divisional artillery made a demonstration to help an attack made further south, and there was some raiding, but 56th Division did not make another offensive move during the weeks it remained in the Gommecourt sector. It was relieved on 20 August.

==== Ginchy ====
After rest and training, 56th Division moved south to take over the line near Ginchy, and prepared to attack again. On 9 September, it launched the Battle of Ginchy, with half the artillery putting down a stationary barrage on the successive enemy positions, the remainder firing a creeping barrage just in front of the advancing infantry. The attack went in at 16.45 in fading light, and soon fell into confusion. Further attacks in the night and at dawn established a line of sorts, and the artillery then had to respond to numerous enemy counter-attacks.

==== Flers-Courcellette ====
The Battle of Flers-Courcelette, a new set-piece attack, opened on 15 September. Preliminary bombardment started on 12 September and continued steadily until Z-day, with no discernible increase until zero hour itself. Lanes were left in the intense bombardment after zero, to allow the new tanks to pass through. Three of these were attached to 56th Division, and were intended to accompany the infantry onto their first and second objectives behind the barrage, and then move on without a creeping barrage to the third and fourth objectives. However, one tank broke down before zero hour, and the ground was so cut up by the artillery that the other tanks and infantry had difficulty getting forward. 56th Division was unable to capture Bouleaux Wood or the Quadrilateral, its final objectives. It took another attack on 25–6 September (the Battle of Morval) for the division to complete the capture of Bouleaux Wood and the village of Combles.

==== Transloy Ridges ====
56th Division's last action during the Somme offensive was the Battle of the Transloy Ridges, which began on 1 October. The mud was awful, supplies and ammunition could only be got forward with great difficulty, and the barrage was consequently feeble. The infantry of 56th Division were relieved on 9 October, but the artillery remained in place, covering the flank of the French forces. When relieved on 31 October, it took two days to dig some of the guns out of the mud. 56th Divisional Artillery then went into the line near Vimy, covering the 3rd Canadian Division from 7 November until 1 December.

==== Reorganisation ====
After the Somme, the BEF's field artillery was reorganised into six-gun batteries. Hence on 5 November 1916, A/CCLXXXII Bty was broken up between B and C and the following month was temporarily replaced as A Bty by a New Army howitzer battery (500 (H) Bty). In January 1917, it was permanently replaced as A by B/CXXVI (from 37th Division), while a section of D (H)/CXXVI (also from 37th Division) brought D (H) up to six guns, giving the brigade the following organisation:

- A Battery: B/CXXVI from 37th Division (6 x 18-pounders)
- B Battery: Original 8th London Battery plus half of 7th (6 x 18-pounders)
- C Battery: Original 9th London Battery plus half of 7th (6 x 18-pounders)
- D (H) Battery: former C (H)/CLXVII from 33rd Division plus 1 section of D (H)/CXXVI from 37th Division (6 x 4.5-inch howitzers)

After the reorganisation, CCLXXXII Brigade left 56th Division on 23 January 1917 and became an Army Brigade, available to be attached to any formation requiring additional artillery support. In fact, it stayed with 56th Division until 6 March, when it was transferred within XI Corps to 49th (West Riding) Division. However, on 29 March, the brigade transferred to I Corps for the forthcoming Arras Offensive.

==== Vimy Ridge ====
I Corps was to attack Vimy Ridge alongside the Canadian Corps, both supported by a mass of guns, for which ammunition had been stockpiled for months. Although CCLXXXII Bde was officially attached to 24th Division, that formation was in reserve for the first day of the offensive, and all the artillery in the corps was pooled. The 4.5-inch howitzers were used for wire-cutting for two days before the attack then, at Zero hour (05.30) on 9 April, two thirds of the field guns laid down a Creeping barrage of shrapnel, smoke, and high explosive to protect the advancing infantry. The barrage was fired at a rate of three rounds per gun per minute, and advanced at a rate of 100 yards (91 m) in three minutes (the 'creeper' had been practised twice in the days preceding the attack, confusing the enemy as to its timing). While the 4.5s concentrated on strongpoints, a standing barrage of the remaining 18-pdrs was fired on each objective, pinning the enemy and protecting the British infantry while they prepared for the next bound. When the infantry reached their Phase 2 objective (the Blue Line) the field gun batteries began moving forward, allowing the heavy guns to move up to occupy their vacated positions. Portable bridges were provided so that the field guns could cross the trench lines. The artillery ensured that I Corps' attack was a brilliant success.

By the evening of 11 April, the Germans only retained one small foothold at the north end of the ridge, the Bois en Hache. Next morning a pre-dawn attack was put in against the wood by two battalions of 24th Division, covered by a barrage fired by CCLXXXII and two other RFA brigades. The leading companies of the 2nd Battalion Leinster Regiment and 9th Bn Sussex Regiment crept out into No man's land at 04.35, before the barrage opened at 05.00. They were slowed by mud and blinding snow, but when the barrage lifted at 05.10 they entered the German front line trench, taking some prisoners. As the weather cleared after dawn, the battalions pressed on down towards the second line. Only some parties entered this trench where they repulsed some counter-attacks, but by now the first objective had been secured and the leading companies were withdrawn to this defence line. The Germans had been driven from the edge of the ridge, and their defences were now completely dominated from above.

Fighting in the southern sector (the Battle of Arras) continued into May, but I Corps was not involved. CCLXXXII Brigade supported 24th Division and the 46th (North Midland) Division until mid-May when it went for rest.

==== Messines ====
CCLXXXII Brigade went back into the line on 24 May with 36th (Ulster) Division in IX Corps of Second Army for the Battle of Messines. It was part of a huge artillery reinforcement for this carefully planned attack, the preliminary bombardment for which had already begun on 21 May. Eight days of intensive bombardment commenced on 31 May, including two practice barrages. The fortified Wytschaete village in front of IX Corps was given a special gas shell bombardment by the 4.5s. At Zero (03.10) on 7 June the assault began with the explosion of 19 huge mines under the German front line, four of them in front of 36th Division, including the Spanbroekmolen mine. Two-thirds of the 18-pdrs fired a creeping barrage ahead of the assaulting infantry, pausing at each objective, while the rest of the 18-pdrs and the 4.5s fired a standing barrage 700 yards (640 m) further ahead. There was virtually no opposition in the devastated German front line and the infantry swept into Wytschaete with ease. While the infantry consolidated their gains, the field batteries moved forwards into No man's land to fire a new barrage which was closely followed by the supporting brigades onto the second objective. Overall, the day's action was a great success, though too often the artillery opened fire on groups of returning friendly troops, mistaking them for German counter-attacks, and the 18-pdrs hastily emplaced in No Man's land often fired short into IX Corps' troops.

==== Third Ypres ====
Immediately after Messines, CCLXXXII Bde moved to the northern part of the Ypres Salient under Fifth Army, joining II Corps on 12 June, then XVIII Corps on 22 June. Until 17 July, the brigade was not actually in the line, but the gunners were engaged in building gun positions for the forthcoming Flanders Offensive, or Third Battle of Ypres. From 1 July, the brigade was attached to 51st (Highland) Division, which was given a role in the initial attack. The British artillery here had fewer advantages than at Messines: the Ypres Salient was cramped and overlooked from Pilckem Ridge in front, and the massed batteries suffered badly from German counter-battery (CB) fire during the 18-day preparatory bombardment. When the infantry attacked on 31 July (the Battle of Pilckem Ridge), the field guns fired the usual creeping and standing barrages on a greater scale than ever before. On XVIII Corps' front, the infantry managed to get across the ridge and down to the Steenbeke stream beyond, while the artillery broke up a serious German counter-attack in the early afternoon. Some of the field batteries moved forward to join others that had remained silent and hidden close to the start-line. But it began to rain, and soon proved almost impossible for the exhausted gunners to get their guns forward through the devastation and mud, and further progress was halted that evening.

Preparations for the continuation of the offensive were hampered by bad weather and the undiminished strength of the German artillery on the Gheluvelt plateau in front. 51st (Highland) Division was relieved by 11th (Northern) Division on 8 August, and a fresh attack was made on XVIII Corps' front as part of the Battle of Langemarck on 16 August. Artillery support was good, and the corps captured some ground, though 11th Division was held up by a group of fortified farms, but the attack was disastrous in other areas. Follow-up attacks on 22 and 27 August only made a few hundred yards.

==== Menin Road Ridge ====
CCLXXXII Brigade stayed with XVIII Corps during the next comparative lull in the fighting, as 51st and 11th Divisions alternated in the line. 51st (Highland) was in the line for the Battle of the Menin Road Ridge on 20 September. There were significant casualties among the massed field batteries from CB fire in the days preceding the attack, but practice barrages were fired, and numerous trench raids were supported by the guns. Field gun barrages were fired at night to isolate German gun positions and prevent them resupplying. On the day of the attack the creeping barrage consisted of five belts of fire, the rearmost ('A', nearest the attacking infantry) being fired by half the 18-pdrs, of which one-third of the batteries were 'superimposed' so that they could be redirected to fire at targets of opportunity without leaving a gap in the barrage. The 'B' barrage line 200 yards (180 m) ahead was provided by the 4.5s and the rest of the 18-pdrs. It was impressed on the infantry that they were to follow the barrage closely, and despite the muddy conditions the attack was a great success. The gunners were then able to break up German counter-attacks, even though they were close to exhaustion.

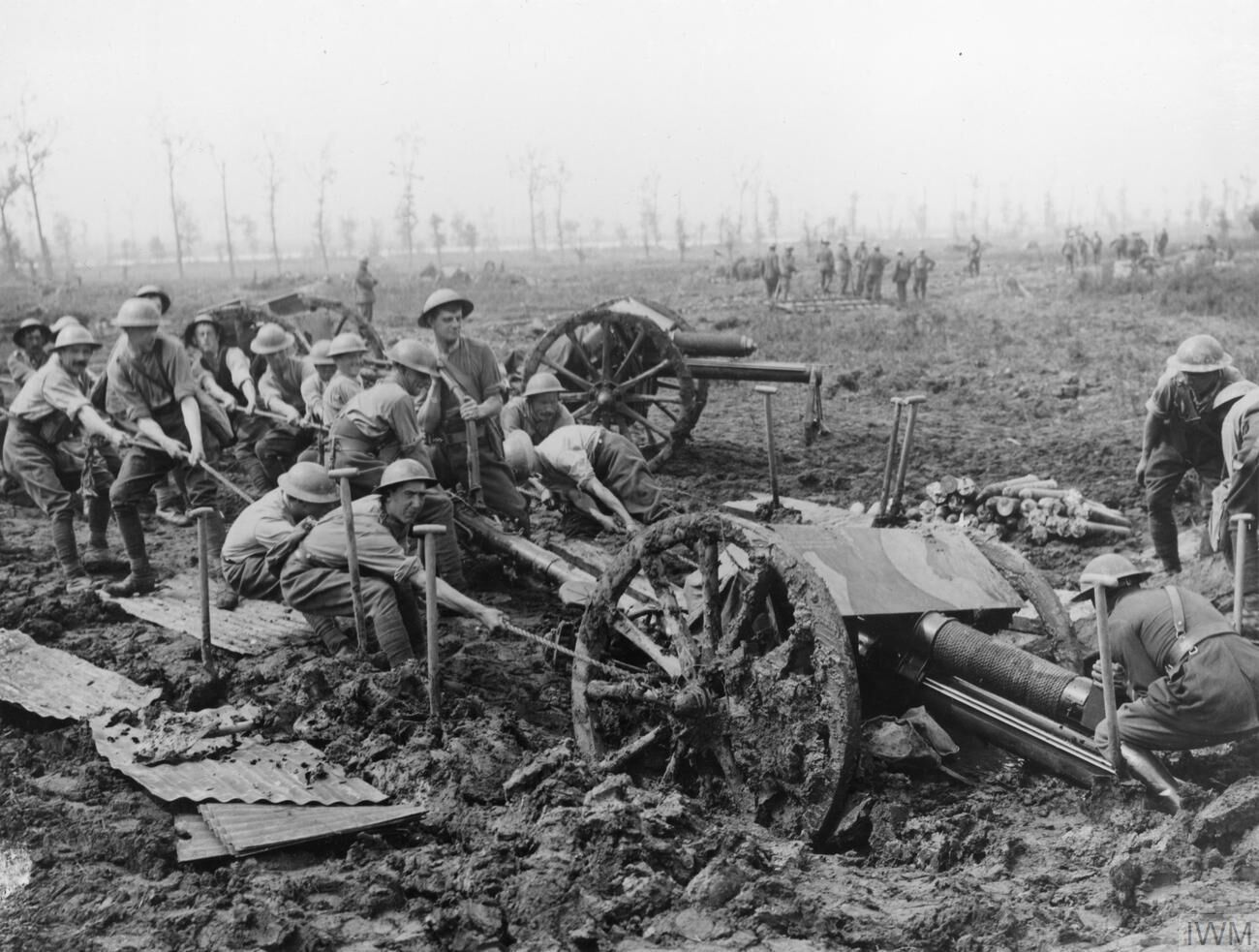
18-pounder being hauled out of mud at Zillebeke, 1917.

==== Polygon Wood ====
11th (Northern) Division came back into the line and was engaged on the periphery of the next major attack, the Battle of Polygon Wood on 26 September. CCLXXXII Brigade was then rested from 27 September to 17 October, missing several more attacks through the autumn, before returning to XVIII Corps with 58th (2/1st London) Division for the Second Battle of Passchendaele (26 October). The infantry were held up by knee-deep mud and fell behind the barrage. On XVIII Corps' front the attack was a complete failure, as was another on 30 October.

On 2 November, II Corps took over this section of the front, and CCLXXXII Bde formed part of 'Left Group' under the Commander, RA, of 58th Division as the troops consolidated the gains that had been made, then under 18th (Eastern) Division when the 58th was relieved. CCLXXXII Brigade itself went for much-needed rest (Note: The regimental historian comments on the extreme exhaustion of the gunners by the end of the Ypres offensive.) on 22 November, but on 3 December it was sent to reinforce VII Corps in Third Army, which was at the end of desperate fighting against German counter-attacks at Cambrai. It was assigned to 21st Division until 3 December when it went into GHQ Reserve.

==== German Spring Offensive ====
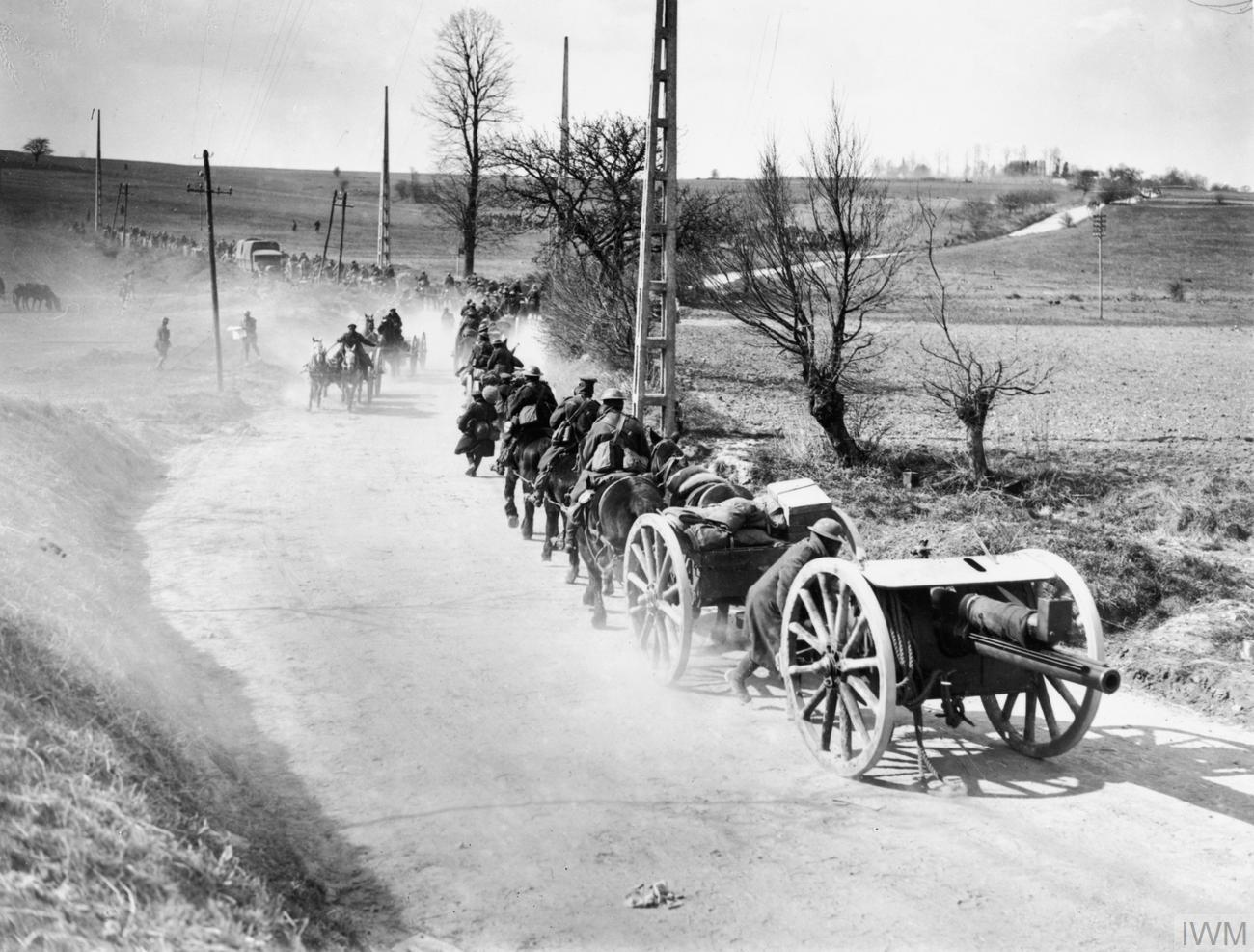
18-pounder battery moving up during the Spring Offensive

The brigade spent the winter alternating between VII Corps (21st, 39th and 16th (Irish) Divisions) and GHQ Reserve. It came back into action with 21st Division when the German spring offensive was launched on 21 March 1918. The division managed to hold the Germans at Épehy, but was forced out next day. On 23 March, the brigade supported 39th Division, brought up from reserve to help the shattered 16th Division. The two divisions fought on as they retired towards the River Somme, the field brigades withdrawing to new positions from time to time as they covered the infantry, inflicting serious casualties on the Germans. At one point, German infantry appeared while the British infantry were falling back through CCLXXXII Bde's guns, and heavy German shellfire was poured onto the battery positions. The batteries lost 11 guns to direct hits but caused heavy casualties firing over open sights as the gun teams galloped forwards. The remainder of the guns were got away, except one in a concealed flank position: the crew waited until the German column was only 200 yards (180 m) away before opening fire with three rounds of shrapnel, 'with terrifying effect', before galloping away with the gun. 39th Division and the remaining guns then crossed the Somme before the bridges were blown up.

==== Rosières ====
For the next two days, the British fought to defend the Somme Crossings. The batteries took full advantage of the many opportunities offered in engaging the advancing enemy with observed fire, firing an average of 3,000 rounds each on 24 March, and continued firing during the night. The Germans were less visible on 25 March, but all possible crossing places were kept under constant fire overnight. However, the line of the Somme had been turned by the Germans and the retreat was resumed, with covering fire from the field guns. The Germans made a major effort on 27 March (the Battle of Rosières). The brigade was still supporting 39th Division on 27 March, but could only contribute one battery; even with the addition of XLVI Bde of 14th (Light) Division, 39th Divisional Artillery could only assemble 53 guns. The artillery engaged the attackers with observed and barrage fire, but the right flank having been pushed back, some of the guns had to retire again, after inflicting considerable losses to the enemy over open sights. Several successful local counter-attacks were made during the afternoon with artillery support.

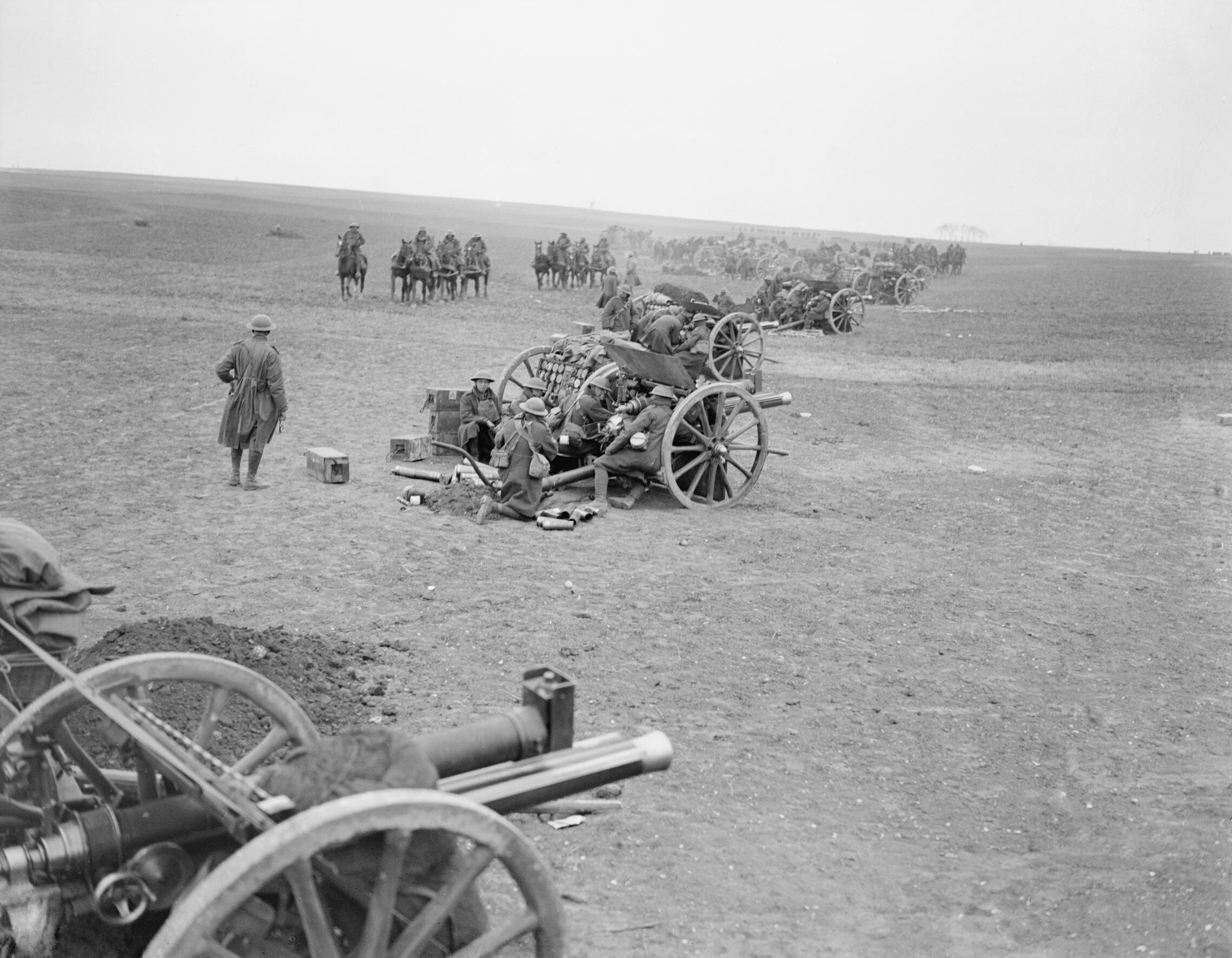
18-pounder battery in action in the open during the Spring Offensive.

On 27 March, the brigade was transferred to the battered 20th (Light) Division, officially in XVIII Corps (though that Corps HQ ceased to function that night and XIX Corps had taken over that part of the front from VII and XVIII Corps). 20th Division was forced back by another German effort on 31 March, but fresher units and formations were arriving, and the German advance was halted on 4 April. CCLXXXII Brigade was withdrawn on 5 April for two weeks' rest and refit with V Corps.

The brigade went back into the line with 38th (Welsh) and 63rd (Royal Naval) Divisions from 21 April, then with 2nd Australian Division from 27 April to 6 May. It was then transferred to III Corps in the Somme sector, which was now a quiet part of the front. It supported 47th (1/2nd London) and 58th (2/1st London) Divisions as they were rotated in the line. The brigade then made a three-day move north to join XI Corps in First Army, arriving on 22 May to support 16th (Irish), 61st (2nd South Midland) and 5th Divisions in turn before going into corps reserve on 19 June. It returned to 5th Division on 25 June for the action of La Becque fought on 28 June. This small offensive operation by XI Corps was carried out without a preliminary bombardment; the barrage started at Zero-hour, creeping at 100 yards (91 m) in four minutes, and the infantry followed closely behind with the bayonet. They easily took their objective 2,000 yards (1,800 m) away, and two German counter-attacks were crushed by the artillery.

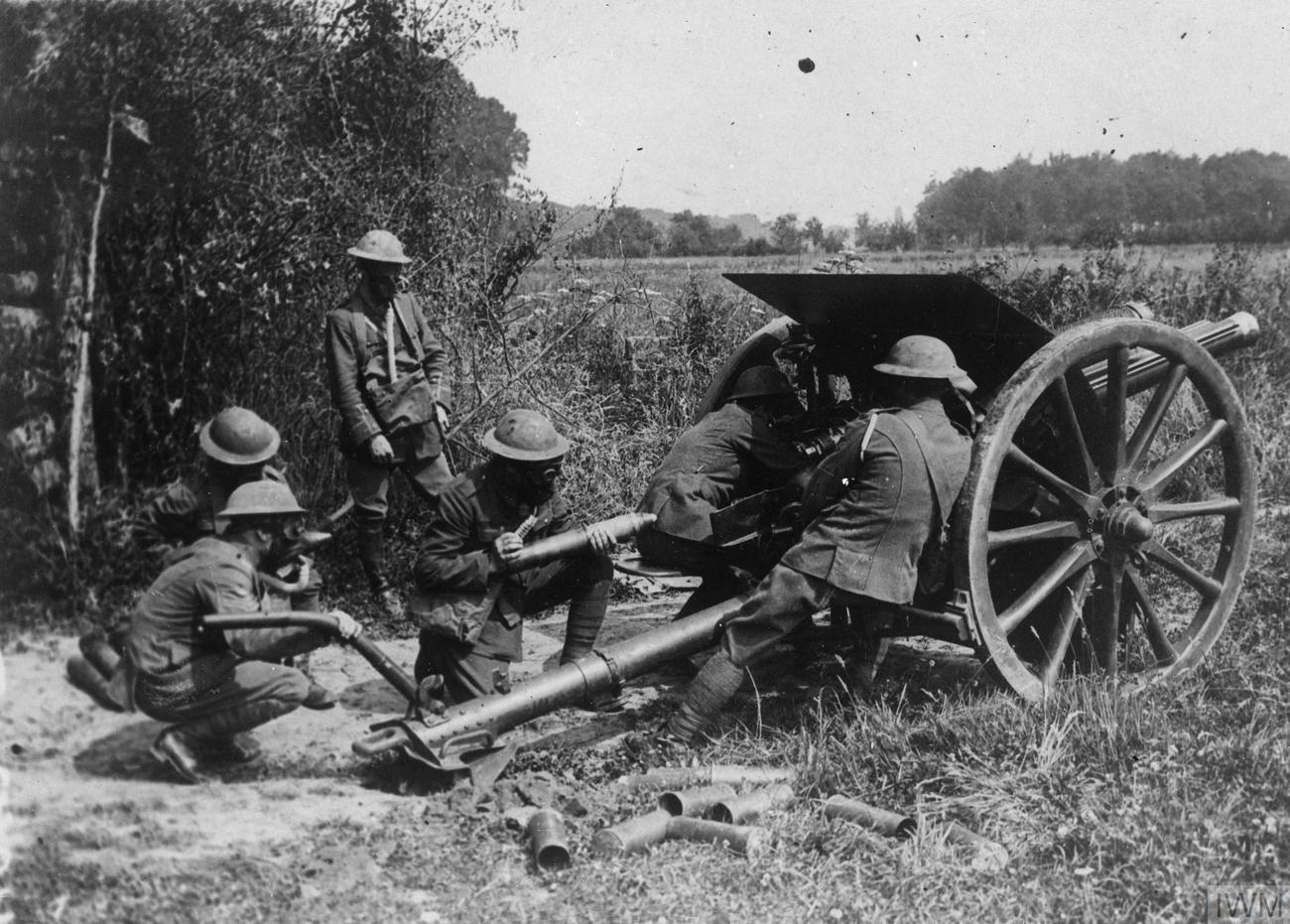
Gunners wearing Small box respirators firing an 18-pounder, August 1918.

==== Hundred Days Offensive ====
CCLXXXII Brigade was rested from 4 to 24 July, then spent a short period with 1st Canadian Division before joining XVII Corps on 31 July, first with 56th (1/1st London) Division, then with 15th (Scottish) Division. First Army was not involved in the early phases of the Allied Hundred Days Offensive, which opened on 8 August, but on 24 August the brigade transferred to the Canadian Corps, which took over part of the army's front in preparation for the Battle of the Scarpe. The Canadians' attack frontage was 4 miles (6.4 km), backed by 14 brigades of field artillery and nine of heavy artillery. The creeping barrage began before dawn on 26 August, with the 4.5-inch howitzers firing 200 yards (180 m) ahead of the 18-pdrs, and the heavies 600 yards (550 m) ahead. The Canadian infantry advanced over the broken country behind the 'excellent' barrage, took their first objective, and then pushed on with little pause towards the second, including the valuable observation point of Monchy-le-Preux, by 07.30. The Canadians were then ordered to exploit forwards with a fresh barrage laid on by field batteries that had followed the advance.

==== Drocourt-Quéant Switch ====
The Canadian Corps kept up the pressure, breaking through the old defence lines beyond Monchy-le-Preux on 28 and 30 August, with CCLXXXII Bde contributing to the barrages, and then storming the Drocourt-Quéant Switch Line on 2 September. For this operation CCLXXXII was one of seven AFA brigades supporting 4th Canadian Division, brought up from reserve for the attack. With the support of the barrage and tanks, all went well to begin with, but as soon as the attacking battalions reached the crest of the ridge beyond the first objective they were halted by German machine guns outside the range of the field artillery. However, with the 'D–Q' line breached, the Germans were forced to retreat that night; the following morning's follow-up attack was cancelled and First Army began a pursuit towards the Canal du Nord.

==== Canal du Nord ====
On 19 September, CCLXXXII Brigade transferred to First Army's other corps HQ, XXII, with which it remained for the rest of the war. The strong German defensive position along the Canal du Nord required a full-scale attack, which was launched on 27 September. For this operation CCLXXXII Bde was once again supporting 56th (1/1st London) Division. While the Canadians stormed across the canal and the defensive positions beyond it, 56th Division was tasked with advancing northwards along both canal banks. For this relatively small but tricky operation the division was supported by no fewer than eight brigades of field artillery. It was delayed by the need for the engineers and pioneers had bridge the canal, but thereafter the attack went well, despite stiff opposition, and was continued under moonlight that night.

==== Selle ====
First Army continued its pursuit towards the River Selle. On 11 October 56th Division found the Sensée Canal strongly held, but an attack by two companies of the 1/13th Bn Londons (Kensingtons), supported by a full three field artillery brigades, cleared Fressies, the last German holding on the southern bank. 49th (West Riding) Division then took up the pursuit for XXII Corps and CCLXXXII Bde supported it until 19 October. The barrage planned for 12 October was cancelled when it was found that the Germans had retreated to the Selle.

The brigade joined 4th Division on 19 October and supported it next day as it attacked during the Battle of the Selle. The division crossed the river before dawn and 2nd Bn Seaforth Highlanders pushed through Saulzoir covered by a barrage from five field artillery brigades, including CCLXXXII; it reached the objective on the high ground beyond with little loss. On 23 October, 4th Division attacked across the Écaillon stream and through the German main line of defence towards Quérénaing. Although some of the infantry lost the barrage, the attack went well: by 10.30 the engineers had two bridges over the Ecaillon for the field artillery to cross.

==== Valenciennes ====
CCLXXXIII Brigade was in corps reserve 26–28 October, then went back to 4th Division for the Battle of Valenciennes (1 November). At Zero, 11th Brigade advanced with the support of nine field artillery brigades including CCLXXXII, and nearly reached the suburb of Marly before two strong German counter-attacks threw them back. However, the neighbouring Canadians had crossed the Scheldt Canal and entered Valenciennes. German resistance was now weakening. CCLXXXII Brigade finally went into corps reserve on 3 November, where it remained until the Armistice with Germany.

=== 2/III London Brigade ===
After the 1st Line divisional artillery left for France, 2/III London Bde joined 58th (2/1st London) Division at Framlingham on 25 September with the following composition:

- 2/7th County of London Battery
- 2/8th County of London Battery
- 2/9th County of London Battery
- 2/III London Brigade Ammunition Column

The division remained in East Anglia, digging trenches, manning coastal defences, and training, until July 1916, when it moved to Salisbury Plain for final battle training. By then the artillery had received their 18-pounders, but were still organised in 4-gun batteries. The batteries of 58th Division were shuffled to produce three brigades of six-gun batteries, and 2/III London Brigade had disappeared by the time the division landed in France in January 1917. (Note: Logically, following the sequence of numbers assigned to other London RFA brigades (1/I to 1/IV became 280–283, 2/I and 2/II became 290 and 291, etc), 2/III London Bde should have received the number CCXCII (292). However, Becke – normally a reliable source – indicates that 2/III rather than 2/IV Bde received the number CCXCIII (293), and is naturally followed by well-researched secondary sources such as Frederick, Litchfield and the Long, Long Trail. Nevertheless, this is categorically contradicted by the regimental history of IV London Brigade which states that its second line brigade became '293rd (4th London) Brigade' and was assembled round 2/10th London Battery (as D/293) rather than 2/9th London Battery as suggested by Becke's sequence of changes. That there was no CCXCII (292) Brigade after the reorganisation of 58th Divisional Artillery into 6-gun batteries is not disputed by these sources. Nor is there any dispute that the reconstituted CCXCIII (293) Brigade included the 1/1 Shropshire and 1/1 Glamorganshire Royal Horse Artillery, a West Lancashire battery, and only one London battery. For the history of CCXCIII (293) Army Field Brigade, see 4th London Brigade.)

== Postwar ==
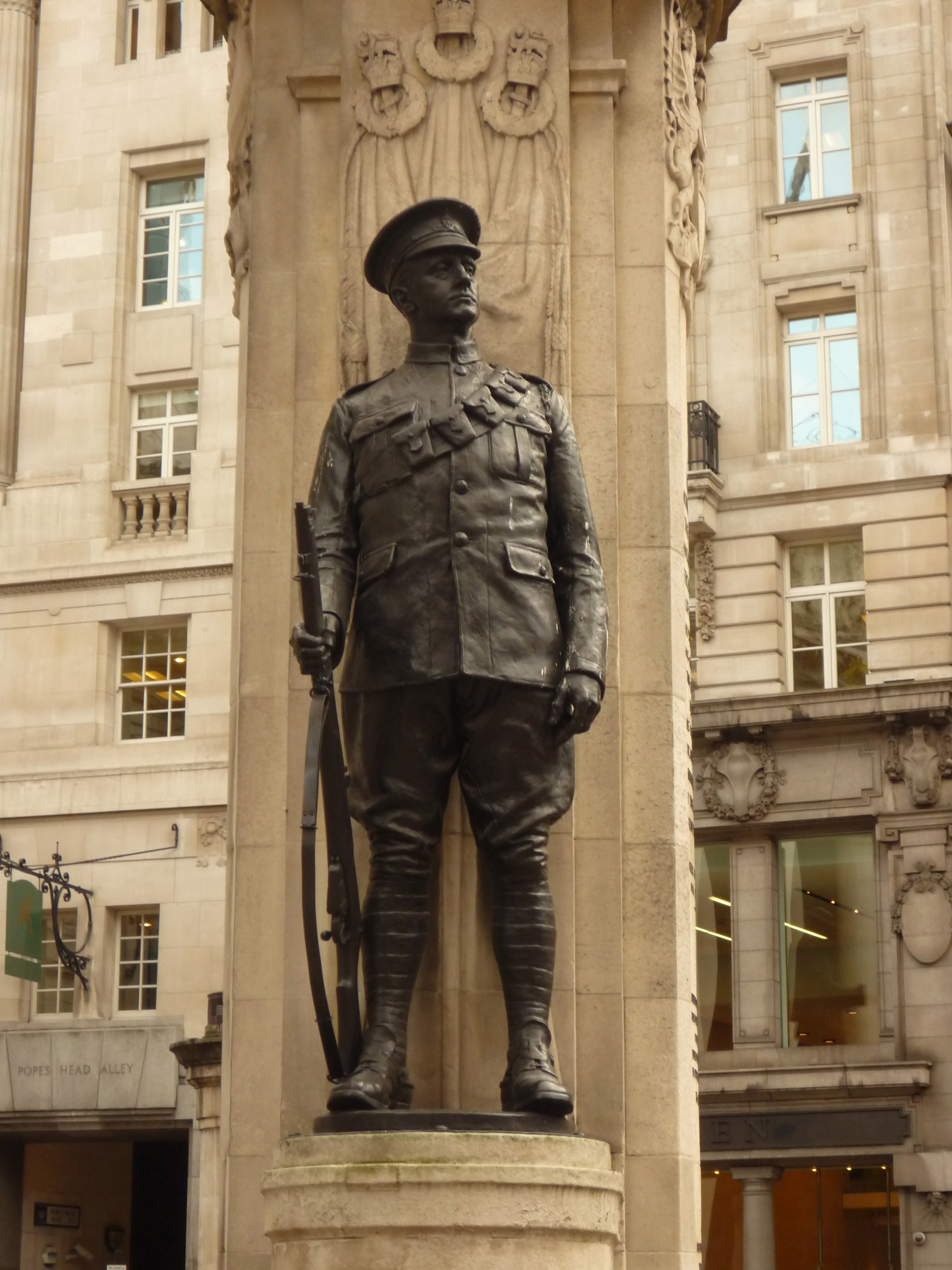
The artilleryman depicted on the London Troops Memorial.

When the Territorial Army was reformed in 1920, two batteries of the former 3rd London Brigade were absorbed by 53rd (London) Medium Brigade, Royal Garrison Artillery, formed from the prewar London Heavy Brigade, RGA at Offord Road, Islington. This unit adopted the foundation date and motto (Nulli Secundus – 'Second to None') of the 2nd Middlesex AVC. The remaining battery of 3rd London Bde became 9th (County of London) Battery at Kennington in the reformed 5th London Bde RFA (later numbered 365 (9th London) Battery and 92nd (5th London) Field Brigade respectively). This unit served in 5th Division during World War II, in France, the Middle East, Italy, and finally in North West Europe. After the war, it was reformed as 289 Parachute Regiment RHA, which was eventually reduced in size to 289th Parachute Troop, Royal Artillery, and then disbanded in 2014.

== Memorial ==
The III London Brigade is listed on the City and County of London Troops Memorial in front of the Royal Exchange, with architectural design by Sir Aston Webb and sculpture by Alfred Drury. The left-hand (northern) figure flanking this memorial depicts a Royal Artilleryman representative of the various London Artillery units.

== Honorary Colonels ==
The following served as Honorary Colonels of the brigade:

- Lt-Gen Sir Edward Bruce Hamley, KCB, KCMG, MP, appointed 6 November 1887, died 1893.
- T.A. Irwin, appointed 18 December 1895.

== Online sources ==
- Imperial War Museum, War Memorials Register
- The Long, Long Trail
- The Regimental Warpath 1914–1918
- Land Forces of Britain, the Empire and Commonwealth (Regiments.org)
- Shropshire Regimental Museum
