= 3rd Kent Artillery Volunteers (Royal Arsenal) =

3rd Kent Artillery Volunteers (Royal Arsenal) 2nd London Brigade, RFA
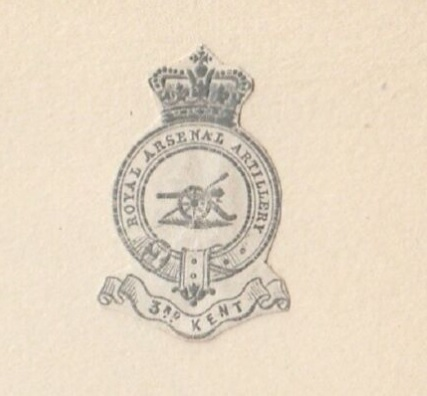
- Letterhead, 3rd Kent Artillery Volunteers, c1880
- Active: 1860–1920
- Country: United Kingdom
- Branch: Territorial Force
- Type: Artillery Brigade
- Role: Garrison Artillery (1892–1908); Field Artillery (1908–1920)
- Part of: 56th (1/1st London) Division; 58th (2/1st London) Division
- Engagements: Battle of the Somme; Battle of Arras; Third Battle of Ypres; German spring offensive Hundred Days Offensive

The 3rd Kent Artillery Volunteers (Royal Arsenal) was a unit of the British Volunteer Force from 1860 to 1920. Originally raised from the workers of Woolwich Arsenal, near London, it later became a London unit of the Territorial Force and served on the Western Front during World War I. Postwar, it was merged with another London unit.

== Origins ==
When an invasion scare in 1859 led to a flood of volunteers forming new military units to defend Great Britain, it was natural that men working at Woolwich Arsenal would organise themselves into an Artillery Volunteer Corps (AVC). (They also formed the 26th (Royal Arsenal) Rifle Volunteer Corps, which eventually became the 20th (County of London) Battalion, The London Regiment (Blackheath and Woolwich).) Formally constituted on 28 February 1860, and designated the 10th (Royal Arsenal) Kent AVC from August that year, the unit was manned by artisans from the Shot and Shell Factory. The nearby Royal Dockyards at Deptford and Woolwich also raised an AVC, numbered 14th (Royal Dockyard) Kent AVC. However, the dockyards closed in 1869 and the 14th Kent AVC was disbanded the following year. Originally raised as eight batteries, the strength of the 10th Kent AVC declined to six batteries during the 1860s, but it also had the small 2nd and 3rd Essex AVCs attached to it. The 9th Kent AVC, formed in 1860 at Plumstead, near Woolwich, was also absorbed by the 10th in 1873. In 1875, the 10th Kent Artillery Volunteers won the Queen's Prize at the National Artillery Association annual competition held at Shoeburyness Old Ranges.

In July 1880, many of the AVCs were consolidated, and the 10th Kent became the 3rd Kent Volunteer Artillery (Royal Arsenal), with its HQ and eight batteries at Woolwich, and the Essex and Plumstead units subsequently resumed their independent identities as the 3rd Essex (September 1880) and 2nd Kent (March 1883). All artillery volunteers were attached to one of the territorial garrison divisions of the Royal Artillery (RA) on 1 April 1882, when the 3rd Kent joined the London Division, changing to the Eastern Division when the London Division was disbanded on 1 July 1889.

As well as manning fixed coast defence artillery, some of the early Artillery Volunteers manned semi-mobile 'position batteries' of smooth-bore field guns pulled by agricultural horses. But the War Office refused to pay for the upkeep of field guns for Volunteers and they had largely died out in the 1870s. In 1888, the 'position artillery' concept was revived and some Volunteer companies were reorganised as position batteries to work alongside the Volunteer infantry brigades. On 14 July 1892, the 3rd Kent was converted to position artillery with four batteries. The unit did well in this role, winning the Queen's Prize for position artillery at Shoeburyness for 1895, 1897 and 1898.

On 1 June 1899, all the Volunteer artillery units became part of the Royal Garrison Artillery (RGA) and with the abolition of the RA's divisional organisation on 1 January 1902, the unit was redesignated 3rd Kent Brigade, Royal Garrison Artillery (Volunteers).

== Territorial Force ==
By the time that the Territorial Force was formed under the Haldane reforms of 1908, Woolwich had been transferred from Kent to the new County of London, and henceforth the unit was administered by the London TF Association. It became II London Brigade of the Royal Field Artillery (RFA), assigned to the TF's 1st London Division with the following organisation:

2nd County of London Brigade RFA

- 4th County of London Battery
- 5th County of London Battery
- 6th County of London Battery
- II London Ammunition Column

== World War I ==
=== Mobilisation and organisation ===
Annual training for 1st London Division had just started when war was declared on 4 August 1914, and the II London Brigade promptly mustered at Woolwich for mobilisation. The infantry of the division were soon posted away to relieve Regular Army garrisons in the Mediterranean or to supplement the British Expeditionary Force on the Western Front. By January 1915, only the artillery and other support elements of the division remained in England, and these were attached to the Second Line TF division (58th (2/1st London) Division) that was being formed. The unit was numbered 1/II London Bde and formed a separate 2/II London Bde, which served with the 58th Division throughout the war.

=== 1/II London Brigade ===
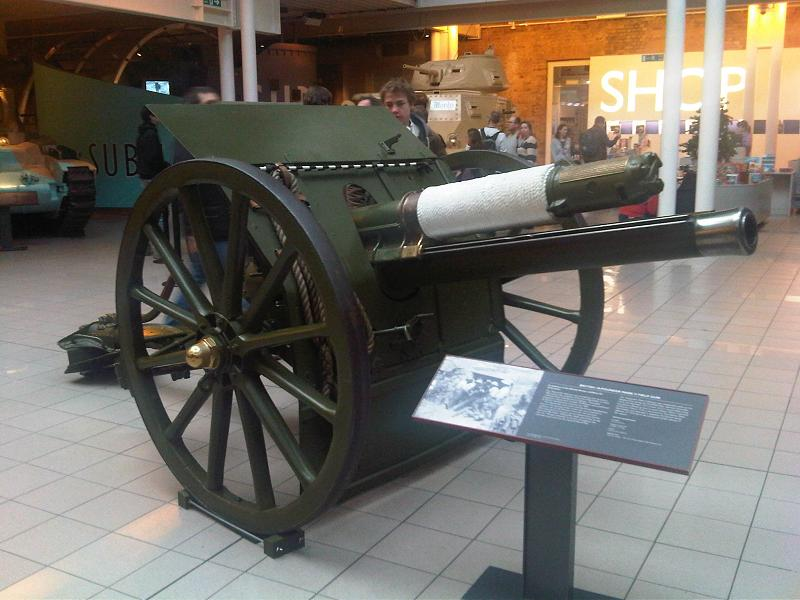
18-pounder Mk II field gun preserved at the Imperial War Museum.

In August 1915, the 36th (Ulster) Division was being readied for service. Its infantry were largely drawn from the Ulster Volunteers and had already received weapons training before the war; the artillery however were newly raised Londoners, and the drivers were still being taught to mount and dismount from wooden horses. The 1st London Divisional Artillery were therefore attached to the Ulster Division until its own gunners were ready for active service. The London field brigades were re-equipped with 18-pounder guns and accompanied the Ulster Division to France, 1/I City of London Bde landing at Le Havre on 4 October 1915. It was in the Line by the middle of the month.

In December, the Ulster Division's artillery arrived from England, and the London Divisional Artillery was transferred to the 38th (Welsh) Division, which had also arrived in France minus its own artillery. 1/II London Bde served with the Welsh Division from 11 December 1915 to 1 January 1916. It was next attached to IV Corps Artillery until the end of February. By now, 1st London Division (now numbered 56th (London) Division) was being reformed in France and its divisional artillery was finally able to rejoin.

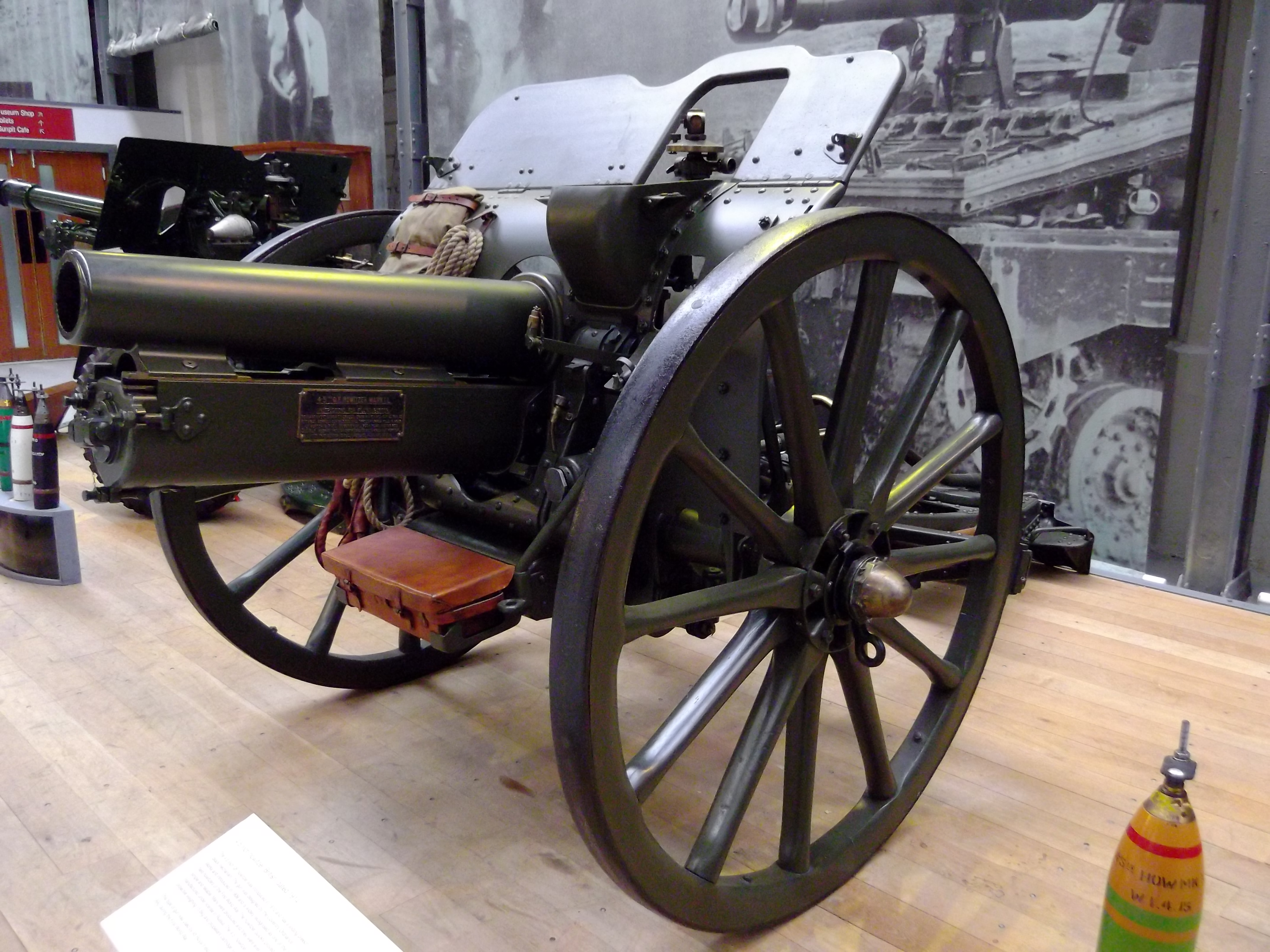
Preserved 4.5-inch howitzer

In April 1916, a Regular battery (109th Battery, from XXIII Brigade Royal Field Artillery, which had been serving in 3rd Division), joined 1/II London Bde. In May, TF artillery brigades were numbered in sequence with the Royal Field Artillery: 1/II London became CCLXXXI Brigade (281 Brigade), and the batteries became A–D. Shortly afterwards D (109th) Battery was exchanged with a battery (formerly 10th County of London Battery) from the divisional howitzer brigade, equipped with 4.5-inch howitzers. Brigade Ammunition Columns were also abolished at this time.

==== Gommecourt ====
The first major action for CCLXXXI (281) Bde came at the Battle of the Somme, and there are detailed accounts of its actions. 56th Division's task for the opening day of the Somme Offensive (the 'Big Push') was to attack the south side of the Gommecourt Salient as a diversion to support the main attack further south.

The divisional artillery was disposed in three groups. 281 Brigade under Lt-Col C.C. Macdowell, together with 109 Bty from 283 Bde, formed the Southern Group ('Macart'). During the preliminary bombardment, Macart was under VII Corps control, but from Zero Hour it was assigned to support the assaulting infantry of 168th (2nd London) Brigade. The batteries began moving into position in late May 1916 and then began to register their targets during June, 281 Bde being the first to open fire.

The Macart Group's role was to 'search' the enemy trenches, villages, woods and hollows. B/281 Battery was in a fold of ground about 1,500 yards west of the British-held village of Hébuterne, while C/281 and 109 Bty were beside the Sailly– Hébuterne road, about 500 yards from the latter village and just over 3,000 yards from the German trenches. The howitzers of D (H)/281 Bty were dug into the gardens and orchards behind Hébuterne, and could range into the German rear areas.

Five days of intense bombardment were planned leading up to the attack, designated U, V, W, X and Y days, but the whole attack was delayed by two days, so there was seven days of bombardment culminating in Z Day on 1 July. The two additional days were used for Interdiction of enemy movement and repair parties, to complete the wire-cutting and counter-battery tasks, and to deceive the enemy. The wear on the guns and the unexpected ammunition expenditure meant that after the intended peak on Y Day (28 June) the Macart Group's firing actually fell away on the additional Y1 and Y2 Days, giving the defenders time to reorganise and repair their positions. The division's batteries and observation posts (OPs) also suffered from German counter-battery fire. Lieutenant John Ball of 281 Bde was killed on 27 June when his OP was hit.

Each day of the firing programme had included an intense bombardment starting at 06.25, reaching a crescendo at 07.20 and lifting at 07.45; on Z Day (1 July), this lifted 15 minutes earlier than usual, in an attempt to deceive the enemy. 56th Divisional artillery was allocated 11,600 rounds for this final 65 minutes, amounting to three rounds per minute for each 18-pounder gun and 4.5-inch howitzer. A smoke screen was laid at 07.25, and under its cover the infantry went 'over the top' and assembled in No man's land. Then, at Zero Hour, 07.30, the guns lifted to pre-arranged targets in the German support and reserve lines while the infantry began their assault.

Having reverted to divisional control at Zero Hour, the 18-pounders had a series of very short lifts, almost amounting to a creeping barrage. The first lift was onto the German reserve trench, on which they fired for four minutes, then they fired for six minutes just beyond it, and then swept the communication trenches for 12 minutes. Next, they shifted to the infantry's second objective for eight minutes. This programme was intended to conform to the infantry's plan of attack.

At first, this went well for 56th Division. Despite casualties from the German counter-bombardment on their jumping-off trenches, the smoke and morning mist helped the infantry, and they reached the German front line with little loss and moved on towards the second and reserve lines. The artillery OPs reported the signboards erected by the leading waves to mark their progress. On 168 Bde's front, the London Rifle Brigade found the wire well cut, except at Point 94 where the shelling had piled it into mounds that still presented an obstacle, and the battalion reached Gommecourt Park and began to consolidate. But the Queen Victoria's Rifles struggled to get through narrow gaps in uncut wire and met fierce resistance at the Cemetery, so that the following battalion, the Queen's Westminsters, got mixed up with them while trying to push through to the second objective, the Quadrilateral. The Germans began counter-attacking about an hour after Zero, and their heavy barrage on No man's land and their own front trenches made it almost impossible for reinforcements and supplies to be got forward to the assaulting battalions, who were now cut off. On the other side of the Gommecourt Salient, the assault of the 46th (North Midland) Division was a disaster, bogged down in mud and uncut wire, and the defenders could turn all their attention to the 56th Division.

Although VII Corps' heavy guns and 56th Division's howitzers tried to suppress the German artillery, the situation was too confused for the OPs and spotter aircraft to allow the divisional artillery to provide close support for the infantry. Several of the field guns were also out of action with broken spring. Even when repaired, the guns had to conserve ammunition later in the day. By 12.30, the counter-attacks were beginning to drive 168th Bde out of its gains and at about 13.00 the isolated battalions in the German lines began to crumble. At 13.30 men were leaving the German positions and returning to the British lines, while the reserve units trying to cross No man's land were virtually destroyed by the German barrage. By mid-afternoon, 168th Bde held only a 400-yard stretch of the German front line trench and was cut off. The field batteries were ordered to conserve ammunition in case of a German attack. All remaining gains had to be abandoned after dark.

==== Somme ====
The attack at Gommecourt had only been a diversion, so it was not continued after the first day., and 56th Division remained in position, holding its original line. On 13 July, the divisional artillery made a demonstration to help the continuing Somme Offensive, and on 17 July all the brigades made raids in the enemy line, but otherwise the period was quiet. On 20 August, it was relieved and moved south to rejoin the Somme Offensive and took part in the following actions

- Battle of Ginchy, 9 September
- Battle of Flers-Courcelette, 15–22 September
- Battle of Morval, 25–27 September
- Capture of Combles, 26 September
- Battle of the Transloy Ridges, 1–9 October

==== Reorganisation ====
In the winter of 1916–17, TF field artillery batteries were reorganised from a four-gun to a six-gun establishment, so C Battery was split between A and B Batteries, and to make up the numbers 109th Battery rejoined together with a howitzer section from other London Field Brigades which were broken up. For the remainder of the war, therefore, CCLXXXI Brigade had the following organisation:

- 109th Battery
- A Battery
- B Battery
- D (Howitzer) Battery

CCLXXXI Bde supported 56th Division in the following actions:

==== 1917 ====
- German Retreat to the Hindenburg Line, 14 March–5 April
- Battles of Arras
  - First Battle of the Scarpe, 9–14 April
  - Third Battle of the Scarpe, 3–4 May
- Third Battle of Ypres
  - Battle of Langemarck, 16–17 August
- Battle of Cambrai
  - Capture of Tadpole Copse, 21 November
  - Capture of Bourlon Wood, 23–28 November
  - German Counter-attacks, 30 November–2 December

==== 1918 ====
- First Battles of the Somme
  - First Battle of Arras, 28 March
- Second Battle of the Somme
  - Battle of Albert, 23 August
- Second Battles of Arras
  - Battle of the Scarpe, 26–30 August
- Battles of the Hindenburg Line
  - Battle of the Canal du Nord, 27 September–1 October
  - Second Battle of Cambrai, 8–9 October
  - Pursuit to the Selle, 9–12 October
- Final Advance in Picardy
  - Battle of the Sambre, 4 November
  - Passage of the Grande Honnelle, 5–7 November

Throughout this period, even when the Division's infantry were resting, the divisional artillery were frequently left in the Line supporting other formations. 56th Division was relieved and drawn back into support by midnight on 10 November 1918, but its artillery remained in action until 'Cease Fire' sounded at 11.00 on 11 November when the Armistice with Germany came into force.

=== 2/II London Brigade ===
After the First Line divisional artillery left for France, 2/II London Bde joined 58th Division on 27 September at Saxmundham with the following composition:

2/II London Brigade RFA

- 2/4th London Battery
- 2/5th London Battery
- 2/6th London Battery
- 2/II London Brigade Ammunition Column

The division remained in East Anglia, digging trenches, manning coastal defences. and training, until July 1916, when it moved to Salisbury Plain for final training. By then, the artillery had received their 18-pounders and 4.5-inch howitzers. As with the other TF artillery, the brigade was assigned a number and 2/II London became CCXCI Brigade (291 Brigade). The batteries were redesignated A–C, a howitzer battery was added and became D Battery, and the brigade ammunition columns were abolished. The division began embarking for France on 20 January 1917 and by early February it was on the Western Front, where it remained for the rest of the war.

CCXCI Bde supported 58th Division in the following actions:

==== 1917 ====
- German Retreat to the Hindenburg Line, 17–28 March
- Battle of Bullecourt, 4–17 May
- Actions on the Hindenburg Line, 20 May–16 June
- Third Battle of Ypres
  - Battle of the Menin Road Ridge, 20–25 September
  - Battle of Polygon Wood, 26–27 September
  - Second Battle of Passchendaele, 26 October–10 November

==== 1918 ====
- First Battles of the Somme
  - Battle of St Quentin, 21 March–3 April
  - Second Battle of Villers-Bretonneux, 24–25 April
- Battle of Amiens 8–11 August
- Second Battle of the Somme
  - Battle of Albert, 22–23 August
  - Second Battle of Bapaume, 31 August–1 September
- Battles of the Hindenburg Line
  - Battle of Épehy, 18 September
- Final Advance in Artois and Flanders, 2 October–11 November.

After the Armistice came into force, skilled men began to return home. Full demobilisation got under way in March 1919 and the artillery left for England on 4 April.

== Postwar ==
When the Territorial Army was reformed in 1920, the II Londons became 360 (4th City of London) Battery in the 1st (City of London) Brigade alongside which they had fought throughout the war. The battery was based with the rest of the brigade in Bloomsbury, and the link with Woolwich ended. Just before World War II, 359 and 360 Batteries were split off to form a duplicate unit (138th Field Regiment), which fought in Tunisia and Italy.

== Honorary Colonels ==
- Major-General Sir John Frederick Maurice, KCB, appointed 14 February 1903

== Memorials ==
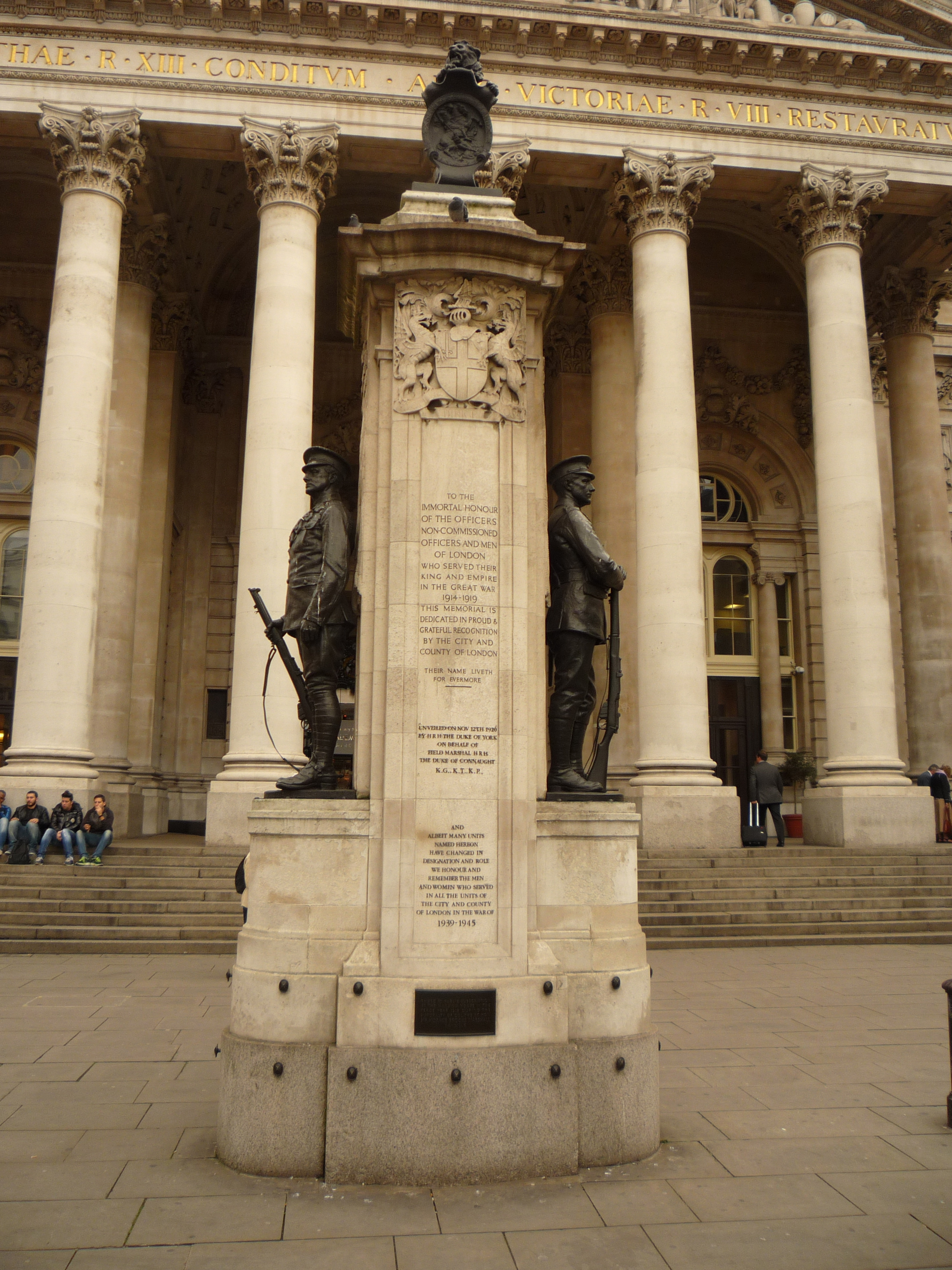
The London Troops Memorial.

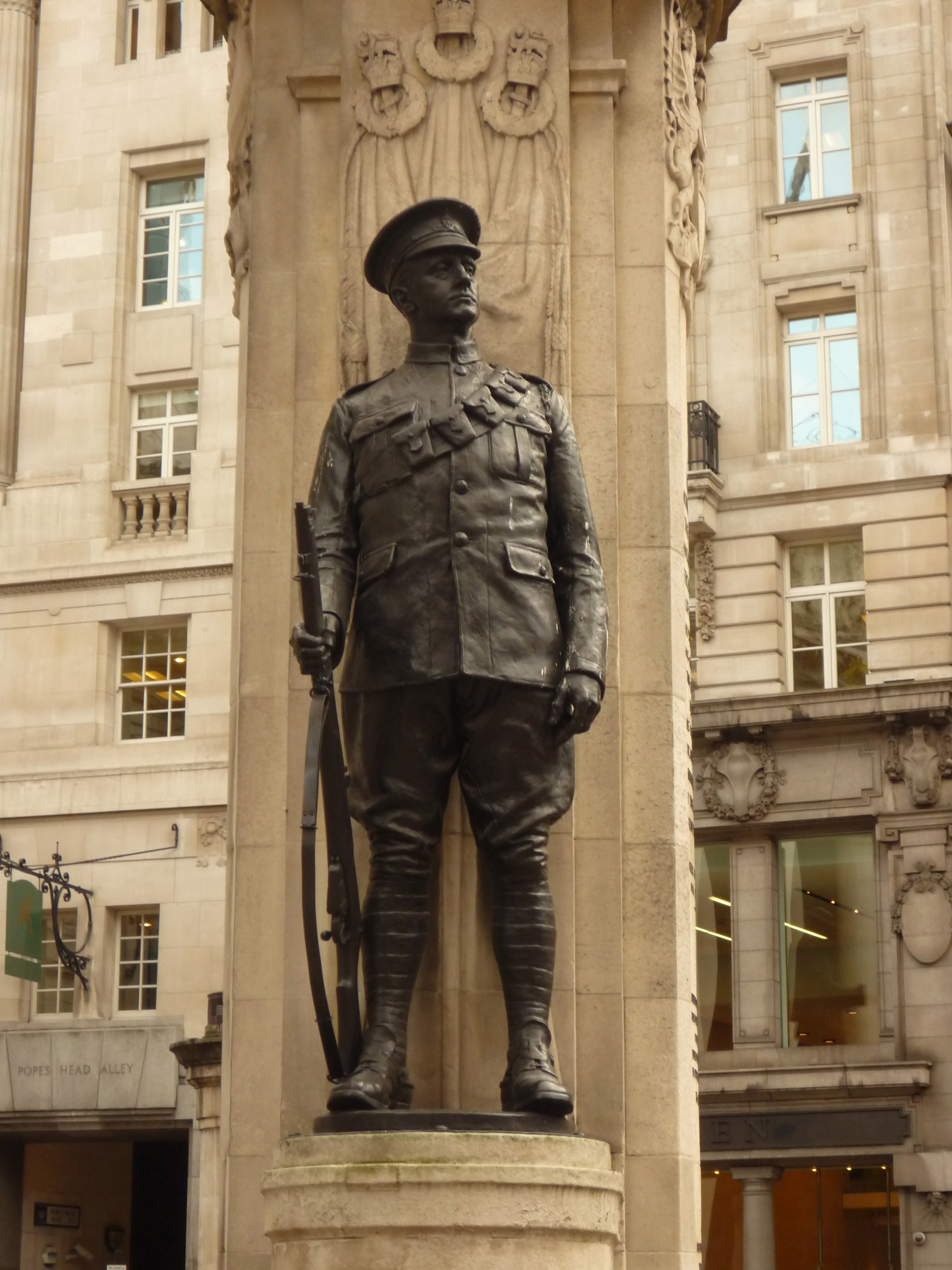
The artilleryman depicted on the London Troops Memorial.

The II London Field Brigade is listed on the City and County of London Troops Memorial in front of the Royal Exchange, with architectural design by Sir Aston Webb and sculpture by Alfred Drury. The left-hand (northern) figure flanking this memorial depicts a Royal Artilleryman representative of the various London Artillery units. All units listed on the memorial were presented with a brass plaque depicting the memorial; that for II Londons was placed at the Vicarage Lane TA Centre in East Ham, and moved to Romford after it closed in 2003.

A memorial board naming the 192 officers and men of 281st and 291st Brigades, RFA, who died in World War I (and in South Africa 1899–1902) was also at the Vicarage Lane TA Centre. It is now in the collection of the Royal Artillery Museum, having been at the Rotunda Museum in their home town of Woolwich.

== External sources ==
- Land Forces of Britain, the Empire and Commonwealth (Regiments.org)
- London Gazette
- The Long, Long Trail
- UK War Memorials Register
