= 1st Newcastle-upon-Tyne Artillery Volunteers =

1st Newcastle upon Tyne Artillery Volunteer Corps
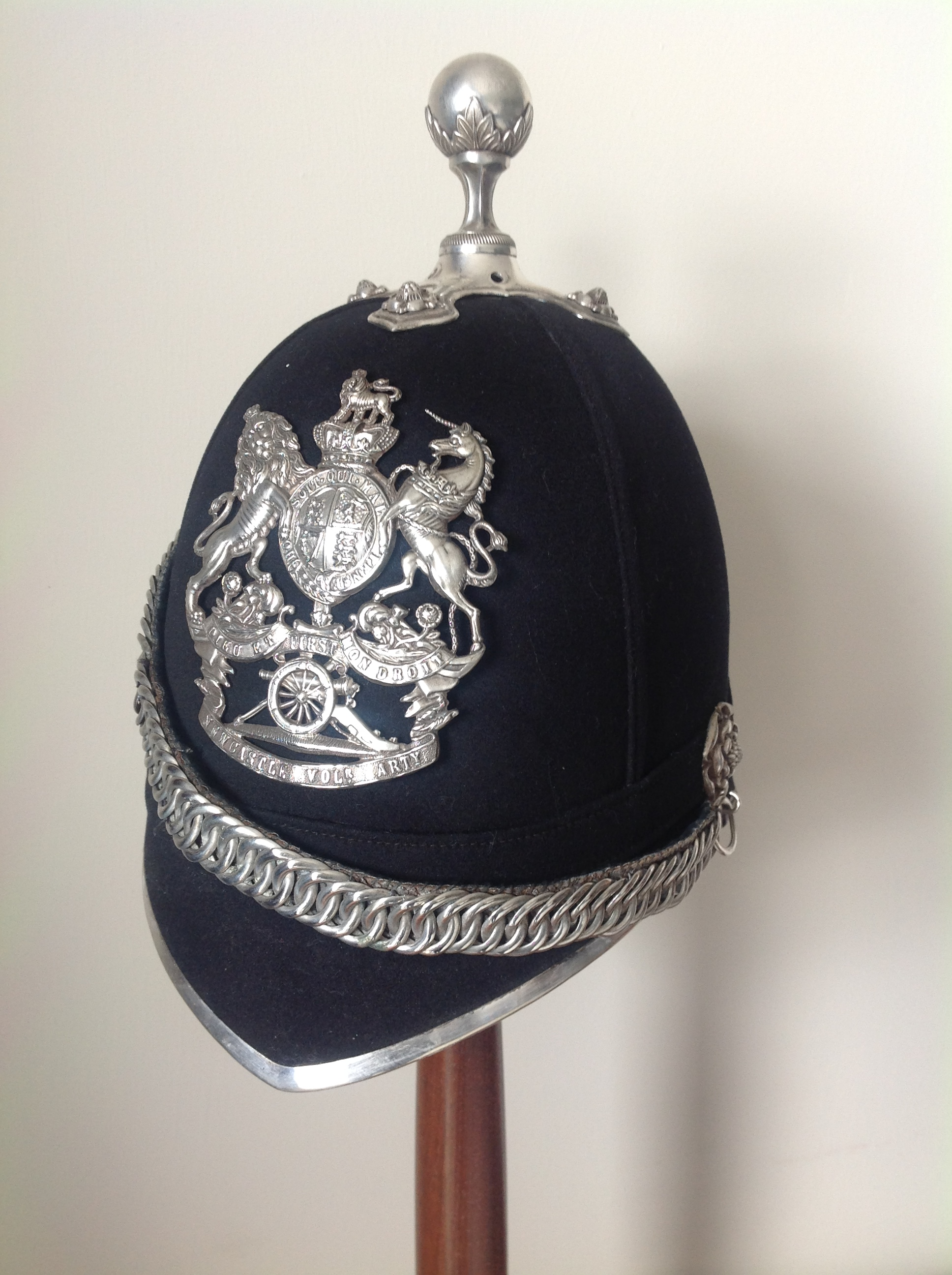
- Officer's home service helmet, 1891-1901
- Active: 1860–1908
- Country: United Kingdom
- Branch: Volunteer Force
- Type: Artillery Volunteer Corps
- Role: Garrison Artillery Field Artillery
- Size: Eight Batteries
- Part of: Western Division, Royal Artillery

Commanders
- Notable commanders: Lord Henry Percy VC

The 1st Newcastle upon Tyne Artillery Volunteer Corps was a unit of the Volunteer Force raised to supplement the British Army at a time of a perceived French threat in 1860.

== History ==
The unit was formed on 2 June 1860 during the great surge of enthusiasm after an invasion scare that saw the creation of many Rifle, Artillery and Engineer Volunteer units composed of part-time soldiers eager to supplement the Regular British Army in time of need.

Attached to the 1st Newcastle AVC were the 1st Berwick-on-Tweed Artillery Volunteers from 1863 until 1866. In addition, the 2nd Northumberland Artillery Volunteers were attached during 1863 and 1864 and the 3rd Durham Artillery Volunteers from 1873 until 1890.

In 1899, the Headquarters for the Corps was built. Named as the Angus Hall Drill Hall, it was constructed at Liddell Terrace, Gateshead.

On transfer to the Territorial Force in 1908, the Corps provided the 5th (Durham) Howitzer Battery of the 4th Northumbrian (County of Durham)(H) Brigade, Royal Field Artillery.

== Honorary Colonel ==
The Honorary Colonel from January 1866 until his death in 1877 was Lord Henry H M Percy VC. From 1885, it was Colonel J R Young.

== Online sources ==
- British History Online
- Land Forces of Britain, the Empire and Commonwealth (Regiments.org)
