= Tipperary Militia =

Auxiliary unit of the British Army

Tipperary Militia South Tipperary Artillery Regiment of Militia
- Active: 1793–1909
- Country: Kingdom of Great Britain (1793–1800); United Kingdom (1801–1909)
- Branch: British Army
- Type: Infantry; Artillery (after 1854)
- Garrison/HQ: Clonmel; Templemore (after 1891)

Commanders
- Notable commanders: John Bagwell (1751–1816) (first commanding officer)

The Tipperary Militia was a regiment of militia raised in County Tipperary. Formed in 1793 it was converted in 1854 to an Artillery Militia unit, which was eventually disbanded in 1909.

== History ==
The unit was first raised in 1793 as an infantry unit by John Bagwell (1751–1816), who was the member of parliament for Tipperary. In 1812 the unit was designated the Tipperary (or Duke of Clarence's Munster) Regiment of Militia.

In December 1854 the Militia was reorganised with the unit being converted into an Artillery unit designated The South Tipperary Artillery Regiment of Militia.

The unit was embodied during the Crimean War (1855–6), the Indian Mutiny (1858–1861) and during the South African War (1900) but never served overseas. The unit was redesignated as the 5th Brigade, South Irish Division, RA, in 1882, Tipperary Artillery (Southern Division), RA, in 1889, and Tipperary Royal Garrison Artillery (Militia) in 1902. It was transferred to the Special Reserve Royal Field Artillery in 1908 on the formation of the Territorial Force and disbanded the following year.

== Bibliography ==
- Beckett, Ian F W (2011). Britain's Part Time Soldiers. The Amateur Military Tradition 1558—1945 (2 ed.). Barnsley: Pen & Sword. ISBN 9781848843950.
- Col George Jackson Hay, An Epitomized History of the Militia (The Constitutional Force), London: United Service Gazette, 1905/Ray Westlake Military Books, 1987, ISBN 0-9508530-7-0/Uckfield: Naval & Military Press, 2015 ISBN 978-1-78331-171-2.
- Litchfield, Norman E H, 1987. The Militia Artillery 1852-1909, The Sherwood Press, Nottingham. ISBN 0-9508205-1-2
- Ryan, C A, Maj, 1890. Records of the Tipperary Artillery 1793-1889
