= Eastern Division, Royal Artillery =

Eastern Division, RA
- Cap Badge of the Royal Regiment of Artillery
- Active: 4 April 1882–31 December 1901
- Country: United Kingdom
- Branch: British Army
- Type: Administrative division
- Part of: Royal Artillery
- Garrison/HQ: Great Yarmouth (1882–89); Dover (1889–1901)

The Eastern Division, Royal Artillery, was an administrative grouping of garrison units of the Royal Artillery, Artillery Militia and Artillery Volunteers within the British Army's Eastern District from 1882 to 1902.

== Organisation ==
Under General Order 72 of 4 April 1882 the Royal Artillery (RA) broke up its existing administrative brigades (Note: In RA terminology, a 'brigade' was a group of independent batteries grouped together for administrative rather than tactical purposes, the officer in command being usually a lieutenant-colonel rather than a brigadier-general or major-general, the ranks usually associated with command of an infantry or cavalry brigade.) of garrison artillery (7th–11th Brigades, RA) and assigned the individual batteries to 11 new territorial divisions. These divisions were purely administrative and recruiting organisations, not field formations. Most were formed within the existing military districts into which the United Kingdom was divided, and for the first time associated the part-time Artillery Militia with the regulars. Shortly afterwards the Artillery Volunteers were also added to the territorial divisions. The Regular Army batteries were grouped into one brigade, usually of nine sequentially-numbered batteries and a depot battery. For these units the divisions represented recruiting districts – batteries could be serving anywhere in the British Empire and their only connection to brigade headquarters (HQ) was for the supply of drafts and recruits. The artillery militia units (sometimes referred to as regiments) already comprised a number of batteries, and were redesignated as brigades, losing their county titles in the process. The artillery volunteers, which had previously consisted of numerous independent Artillery Volunteer Corps (AVC) of various sizes, sometimes grouped into administrative brigades, had been consolidated into larger AVCs in 1881, which were now affiliated to the appropriate territorial division.

== Composition 1882–89 ==
Eastern Division, RA, listed third in order of precedence, was organised within Eastern District with the following composition (regular batteries changed location frequently):

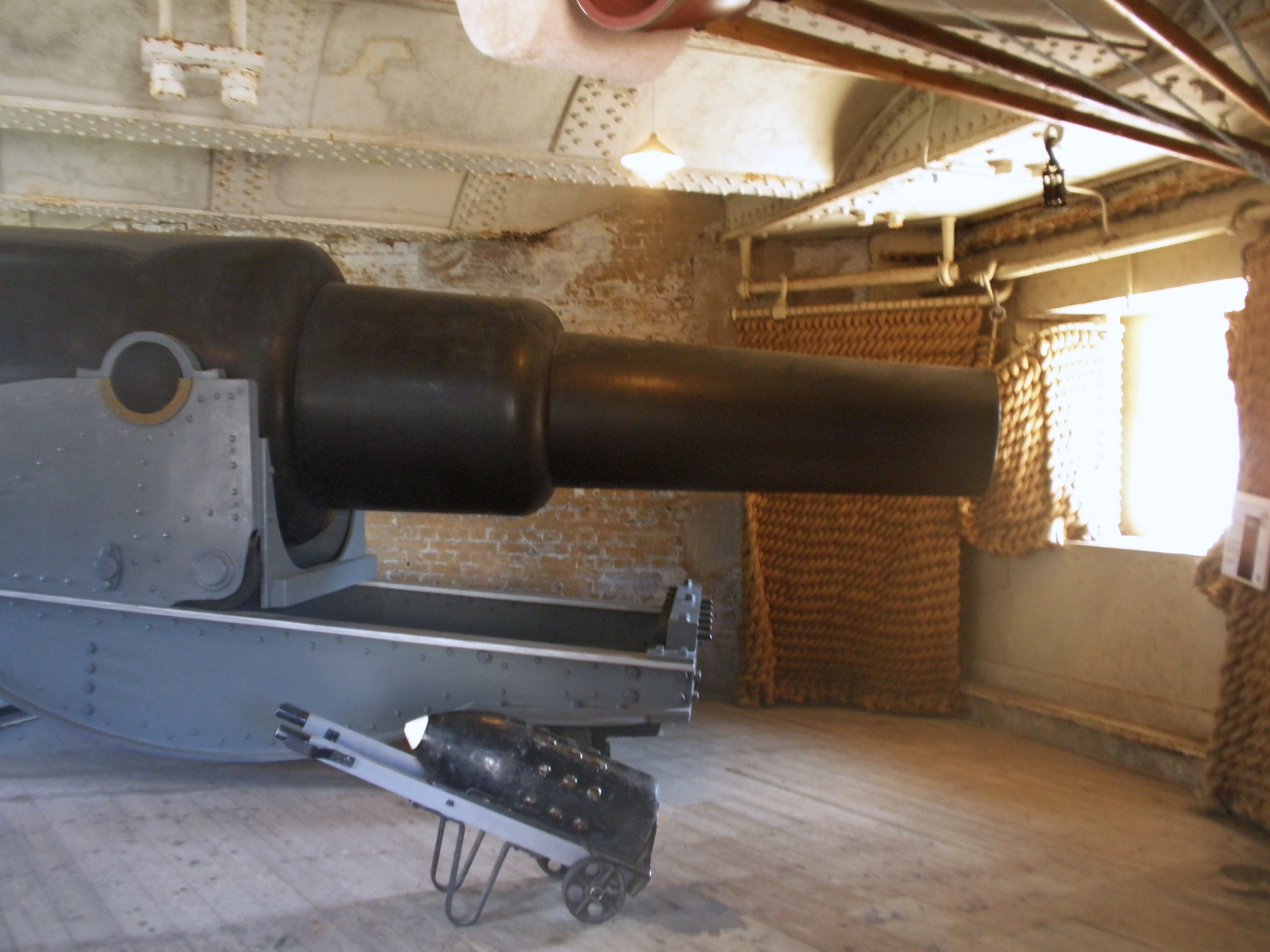
Gun position at Landguard Fort, defending the port of Harwich.

- Headquarters (HQ) at Great Yarmouth
- 1st Brigade
  - HQ at Colchester
  - 1st Bty at Landguard Fort – formerly 15th Bty, 11th Bde
  - 2nd Bty at Sheerness – formerly 14th Bty, 8th Bde
  - 3rd Bty at Fort Victoria, Isle of Wight – formerly 20th Bty, 8th Bde
  - 4th Bty at Shoeburyness – formerly 13th Bty, 8 Bde
  - 5th Bty at Ceylon – formerly 3rd Bty, 12th Bde
  - 6th Bty at Ceylon – formerly 13th Bty, 7th Bde
  - 7th Bty at Thayetmyo – formerly 7th Bty, 9th Bde
  - 8th Bty at Aden – formerly 16th Bty, 9th Bde
  - 9th Bty at Taungoo – formerly 4th Bty, 9th Bde
- Prince of Wales's 2nd Brigade at Great Yarmouth – formerly Prince of Wales's Own Norfolk Artillery Militia (6 btys)
- 3rd Brigade at Ipswich – formerly Suffolk Artillery Militia (5 btys)
- 1st (Norfolk and Suffolk) Norfolk Artillery Volunteers at Great Yarmouth
- 1st Essex Artillery Volunteers at Stratford
- 1st Lincolnshire Artillery Volunteers at Grimsby

== Reorganisation 1889–1902 ==
On 1 July 1889 the garrison artillery was reorganised again into three large territorial divisions of garrison artillery and one of mountain artillery. The names of the territorial divisions seemed arbitrary, with the Scottish units being grouped in the South Division, for example, but this related to where the need for coastal artillery was greatest, rather than where the units recruited. The artillery militia units regained their county designations, as did those volunteer units that had adopted brigade titles. After 1889 all were intended to include '(Eastern Division, Royal Artillery)' after their title, but many of the volunteers did not use them. From 1 August 1891 garrison artillery batteries were termed companies (unless they were equipped with specific guns, such as mountain batteries or position batteries), and some were grouped into double companies at this time before reverting to their previous numbers in March 1894.

- HQ at Dover

=== Regulars ===
- 1st Co at Fort St George, Madras – formerly 7th London Bty; became 53rd Co, RGA
- 2nd Co at Landguard Fort – formerly 6th South Irish Bty; became 84th Co, RGA
- 3rd Co at Gibraltar – formerly 3rd Lancashire Bty; became 37th Co, RGA
- 4th Co at Ferozepore – formerly 8th Eastern Bty; became 54th Co, RGA
- 5th Co at Sheerness – formerly 5th Scottish Bty; became 66th Co, RGA
- 6th Co at Gibraltar – formerly 1st Cinque Ports Bty; became 103rd Co, RGA
- 7th Co at Sheerness – formerly 8th London Bty; 7th Siege Train Co 1894; 7th Heavy Co from 1900; became 90th Co, RGA
- 8th Co at Roorkee – formerly 4th Eastern Bty; became 40th Co, RGA
- 9th Co at Gibraltar – formerly 2nd Western Bty; 3A Co 1891–94; became 39th Co, RGA
- 10th Co in Egypt – formerly 3rd Northern Bty; became 102nd Co, RGA
- 11th Co at Shoeburyness – formerly 6th North Irish Bty; 2A Co 1891–94; became 77th Co, RGA
- 12th Co at Gibraltar – formerly 3rd Western Bty; 12th Siege Train Co 1900; became 23rd Co, RGA
- 13th Co at Thayetmyo – formerly 2nd Eastern Bty; became 34th Co, RGA
- 14th Co at Rawalpindi – formerly 9th Eastern Bty; became 8th Co, RGA
- 15th Co at Rawalpindi – formerly 7th Eastern Bty; 15th Siege Train Co 1894; became 11th Co, RGA
- 16th Co at Sheerness – formerly 9th Scottish Bty; became 74th Co, RGA
- 17th Co at Dover – formerly 8th Lancashire Bty; 5A Co 1891–94; became 67th Co, RGA
- 18th Co at Dover – formerly 5th London Bty; became 80th Co, RGA
- 19th Co at Sheerness – formerly 6th Lancashire Bty; 9th Co 1891–94; became 76th Co, RGA
- 20th Co at Dover – formerly 4th London Bty; 18A Co 1891–94; became 81st Co, RGA
- 21st Co at Mandalay – formerly 7th Cinque Ports Bty; became 12th Co, RGA
- 22nd Co at Trimulgherry – formerly 8th Cinque Ports Bty; 22nd Siege Train Co 1894; became 13th Co, RGA
- 23rd Co at Jhansi – formerly 1st London Bty; became 20th Co, RGA
- 24th Co at Gibraltar – formerly 2nd Lancashire Bty; 6A Co 1891; disbanded 1894
- 25th Co at Shoeburyness – formerly 5th Cinque Ports Bty; 17th Co 1891; 17th Siege Train Co 1892; 25th Co 1894; became 82nd Co, RGA
- 26th Co at Gibraltar – formerly 3rd Eastern Bty; 19 Co 1891–94; became 36th Co, RGA
- 27th Co at Gibraltar – formerly 4th Northern Bty; 19A Co 1891; 24th Co 1894; became 38th Co, RGA
- 28th Co at Royal Artillery Barracks, Woolwich – formerly 10th London Bty; 11th Co 1891; 11th Siege Train Co 1894; transferred as 33rd Co Southern Division 1894
- 29th Co at Dover – formerly 10th Scottish Bty; transferred as 17A Co Western Division 1891
- 29th Co – new Co formed 1898; became 19th Co, RGA
- 30th Co – reformed 1900 from 19th Bty, 9th Bde, RFA; became 24th Co, RGA
- 31st Co – formed 1900; became 26th Co, RGA
- 32nd Co – reformed 1901 from 8th Bty, 7th Bde, RFA; became 104th Co, RGA
- Depot Co at Dover – formerly Cinque Ports Depot Bty; redesignated 1st Depot Co 1895; became No 1 Depot, RGA
  - 1st Sub-Depot at Woolwich – formerly London Depot Bty; transferred as 2nd Sub-depot, Western Division, 1892

=== Militia ===
- Kent Artillery (Eastern Division) at Dover (6 Btys)
- Prince of Wales's Own Norfolk Artillery (Eastern Division) at Great Yarmouth (6 Btys)
- Suffolk Artillery (Eastern Division) at Ipswich (6 Btys)
- Sussex Artillery (Eastern Division) at Eastbourne (5 Btys)

=== Volunteers ===
- 1st Sussex Artillery Volunteers at Brighton
- 2nd Sussex Artillery Volunteers at Eastbourne
- 1st Norfolk Artillery Volunteers at Great Yarmouth
- 1st Kent Artillery Volunteers at Gravesend
- 2nd Kent Artillery Volunteers at Plumstead
- 3rd Kent Artillery Volunteers (Royal Arsenal) at Woolwich
- 1st Essex Artillery Volunteers at Stratford
- 1st Cinque Ports Artillery Volunteers at Dover
- 2nd Cinque Ports Artillery Volunteers at St Leonards-on-Sea – formed 1890
- 2nd Middlesex Artillery Volunteers at Custom House, City of London
- 3rd Middlesex Artillery Volunteers at Charing Cross, London
- 1st London Artillery Volunteers at City of London
- 1st Suffolk and Harwich Volunteer Artillery at Harwich – formed 1899

== Disbandment ==
In 1899 the Royal Artillery was divided into two distinct branches, field and garrison. The field branch included the Royal Horse Artillery (RHA) and the newly named Royal Field Artillery (RFA). The garrison branch was named the Royal Garrison Artillery (RGA) and included coast defence, position, heavy, siege and mountain artillery. The division became Eastern Division, RGA. The RGA retained the divisions until they were scrapped on 1 January 1902, at which point the Regular RGA companies were numbered in a single sequence and the militia and volunteer units were designated '--- shire RGA (M)' or '(V)' as appropriate.

== See also ==
- Royal Garrison Artillery
- List of Royal Artillery Divisions 1882–1902
- Southern Division, Royal Artillery
- Western Division, Royal Artillery
- Mountain Division, Royal Artillery
