= 1st Lancashire Artillery Volunteers =

1st Lancashire Artillery Volunteers Lancashire & Cheshire RGA 524th (Lancashire & Cheshire) Coast Rgt, RA 420th (Lancashire & Cheshire) Coast Rgt, RA
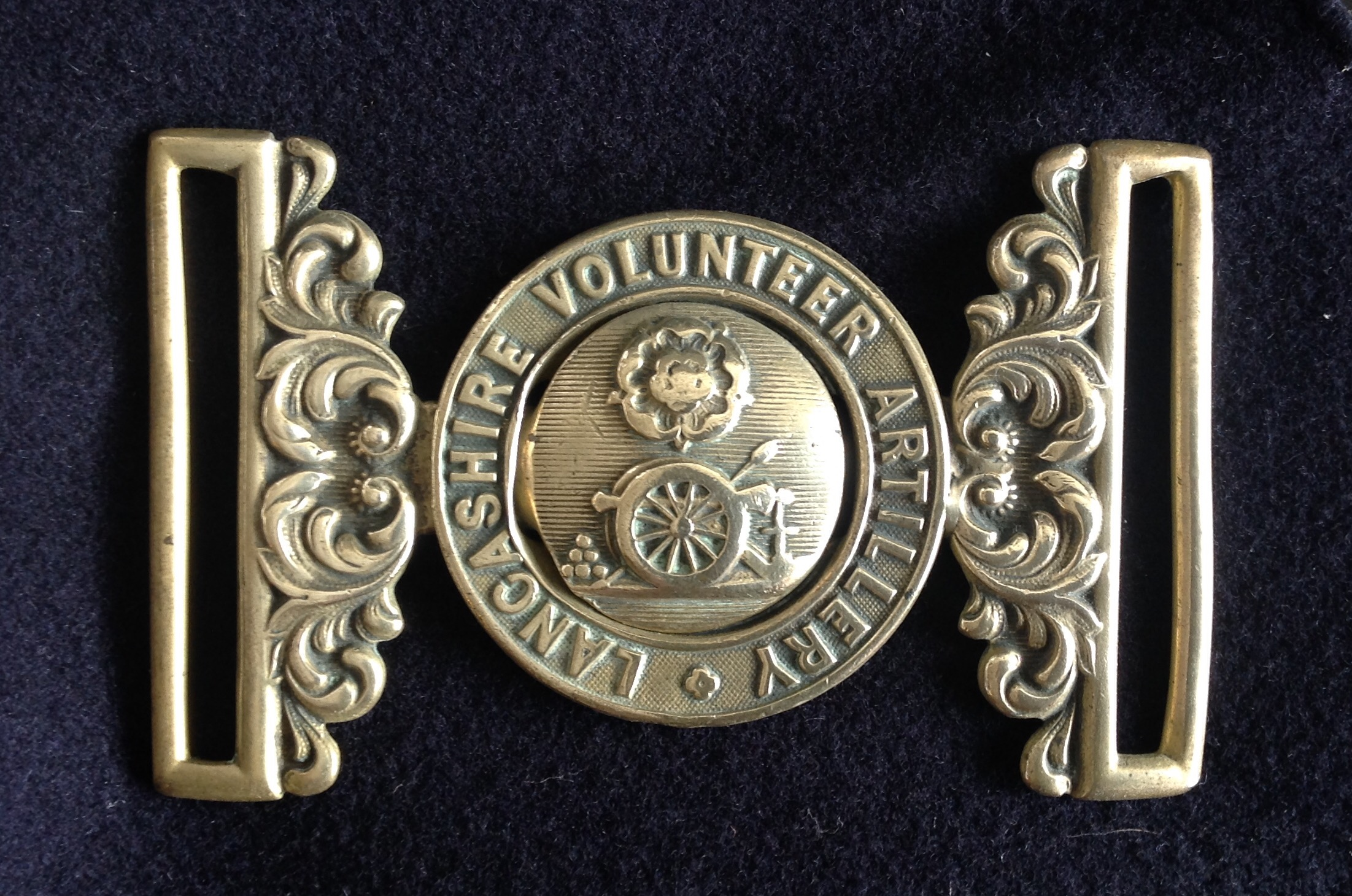
- 19th Century waistbelt of the Lancashire Volunteer Artillery
- Active: 1859–1956
- Country: United Kingdom
- Branch: Volunteer Force/Territorial Army
- Role: Coastal artillery
- Part of: Mersey Fire Command
- Garrison/HQ: Liverpool
- Nickname: 'Brown's Corps'
- Engagements: World War I World War II

The 1st Lancashire Artillery Volunteers (1st LAV), popularly known as 'Brown's Corps', was an auxiliary unit of the British Army raised in Liverpool in 1859. As the Lancashire & Cheshire Royal Garrison Artillery in the Territorial Force it was responsible for defending the Mersey Estuary and the coastline of North West England. It was one of the few coast defence units to fire a shot during World War I but also provided personnel for a number of siege batteries that saw action on the Western Front. It continued in the coast defence role during World War II, at the end of which it sent troops to work in the rear areas in Europe. It was reformed postwar but was broken up when the coast artillery branch was abolished in 1956.

== Volunteer Force ==
An invasion scare in 1859 led to the emergence of the Volunteer Movement and huge enthusiasm for joining local Volunteer Corps. The 1st Administrative Brigade, Lancashire Artillery Volunteers, was established in February 1860 to bring together a number of small artillery volunteer corps (AVCs) that had sprung up in the Liverpool area of Lancashire:

- 1st (Liverpool) Lancashire AVC – 16 November 1859, as two batteries
- 2nd (Crosby) Lancashire AVC – 12 December 1859; struck off 1864
- 6th (Windsor Iron Works) Lancashire AVC – 20 December 1859; struck off 1864
- 7th (Liverpool) Lancashire AVC (Liverpool) – 21 December 1859; struck off 1869
- 13th (Everton) Lancashire AVC – 28 February 1860; struck off 1863
- 14th (Liverpool) Lancashire AVC – 28 February 1860; absorbed by 1st as No 3 Battery in 1861
- 20th (Liverpool) Lancashire AVC – 8 August 1860; absorbed by 6th in 1861

(Dates given are those of first officers' commissions).

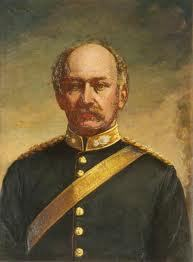
Lt-Col James Clifton Brown, MP.

The Brown family took a prominent role in the early history of the unit and it was popularly known as 'Brown's Corps'. Sir William Brown, 1st Baronet, of Richmond Hill (died 1864), was Honorary Colonel of the 1st Lancashire AVC, and his grandson and successor Sir William Richmond Brown, 2nd Baronet, was appointed Lieutenant-Colonel of the 1st Admin Bde in 1861. The 2nd Baronet's younger brother, James Clifton Brown (simultaneously an officer in the Royal Lancashire Militia Artillery), became Major of the brigade in 1862 and from 1864 Lt-Col of the 1st Lancashire AVC.

By 1869, due to disbandments and amalgamations, the admin brigade disappeared leaving the 1st Lancashire AVC as an independent unit of eight batteries. Sir William Richmond Brown, 2nd Bt, now became the honorary colonel, and the Lt-Col Commandant was his younger brother Alexander Hargreaves Brown, formerly a Cornet in the 5th Dragoon Guards (later 1st Baronet of a new creation).

Another family closely associated with 1st Lancashire AVC was the Behrends, a Liverpool shipbroking family. Henry David and Edward Augustus Behrend were commissioned into 'Brown's Corps' in 1887 and 1888, appointed captains in 1890 and 1893 and majors in 1900 and 1905 respectively. H.D. Behrend became Lt-Col in 1906 and retired in 1913. Lieutenant Arthur Behrend served in the East Lancashire Regiment and with 90th Bde RGA during World War I, and returned to the Lancashire & Cheshire Artillery after the Armistice.

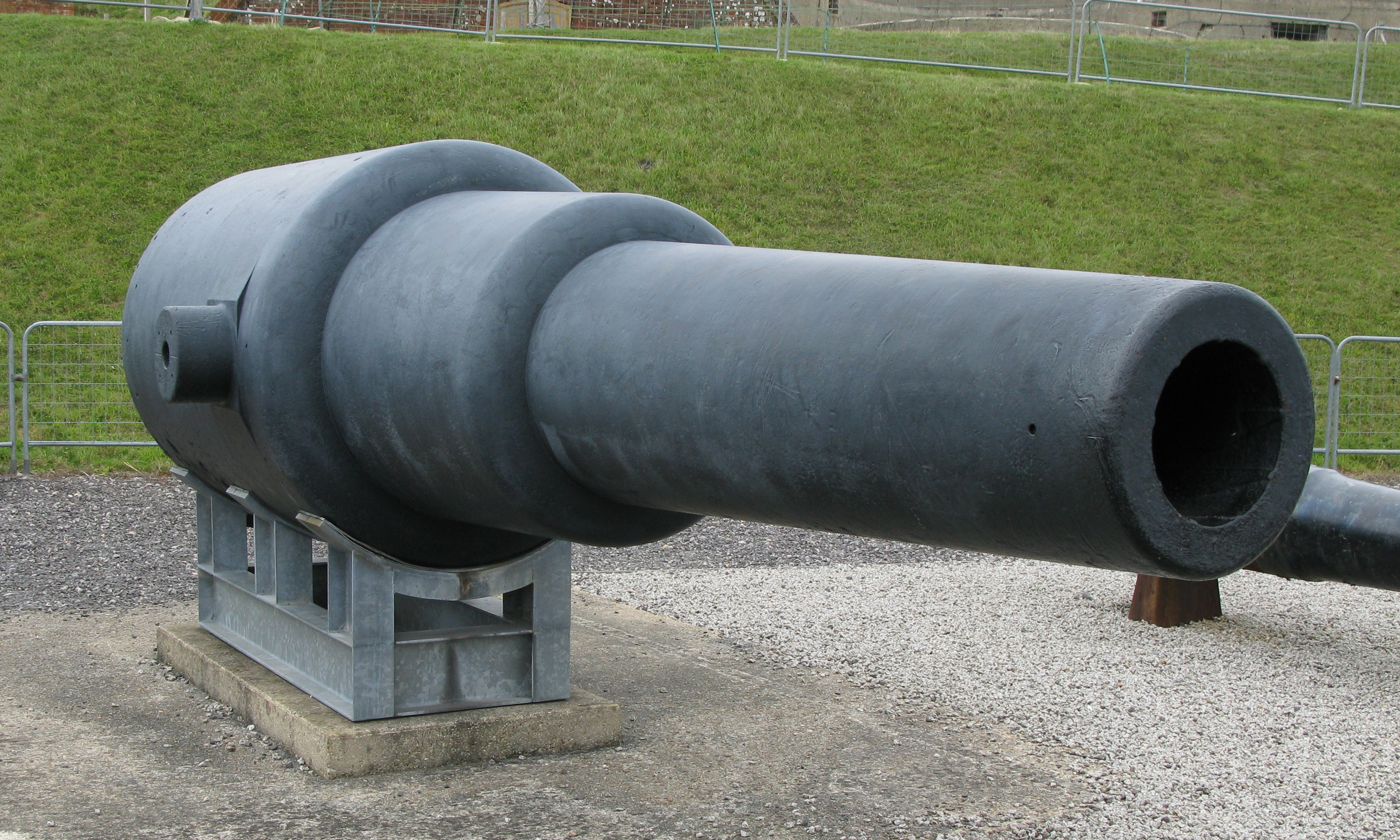
RML 12.5-inch gun of 1875 preserved at Fort Nelson.

The 1st LAV's war stations were the gun batteries guarding the approaches to Liverpool on the Lancashire (north) shore of the Mersey Estuary, Seaforth Battery and North Fort. Seaforth Battery was completed in 1879 and mounted four 12.5-inch RML guns (later replaced by two 4.7-inch QF guns). The older North Fort was disarmed and dismantled between 1884 and 1887 and its site taken over by the expanding docks. A new battery was built further up the coast at Crosby Point in 1906–07, named Crosby Battery and armed with three 6-inch Mark VII BL guns by 1914. In peacetime the defences were maintained by a small detachment of Regular gunners from the Royal Garrison Artillery (RGA) who also trained the Volunteers.

By the 1870s the 1st LAV had established its headquarters (HQ) at 19 Low Hill, Liverpool. It was included in the Lancashire Division of the Royal Artillery (RA) from 1 April 1882, transferring to the Southern Division when the Lancashire Division was abolished on 1 July 1889. On 1 June 1899 all the Volunteer artillery units became part of the Royal Garrison Artillery (RGA) and with the abolition of the RA's divisional organisation on 1 January 1902, the unit became the 1st Lancashire RGA (Volunteers).

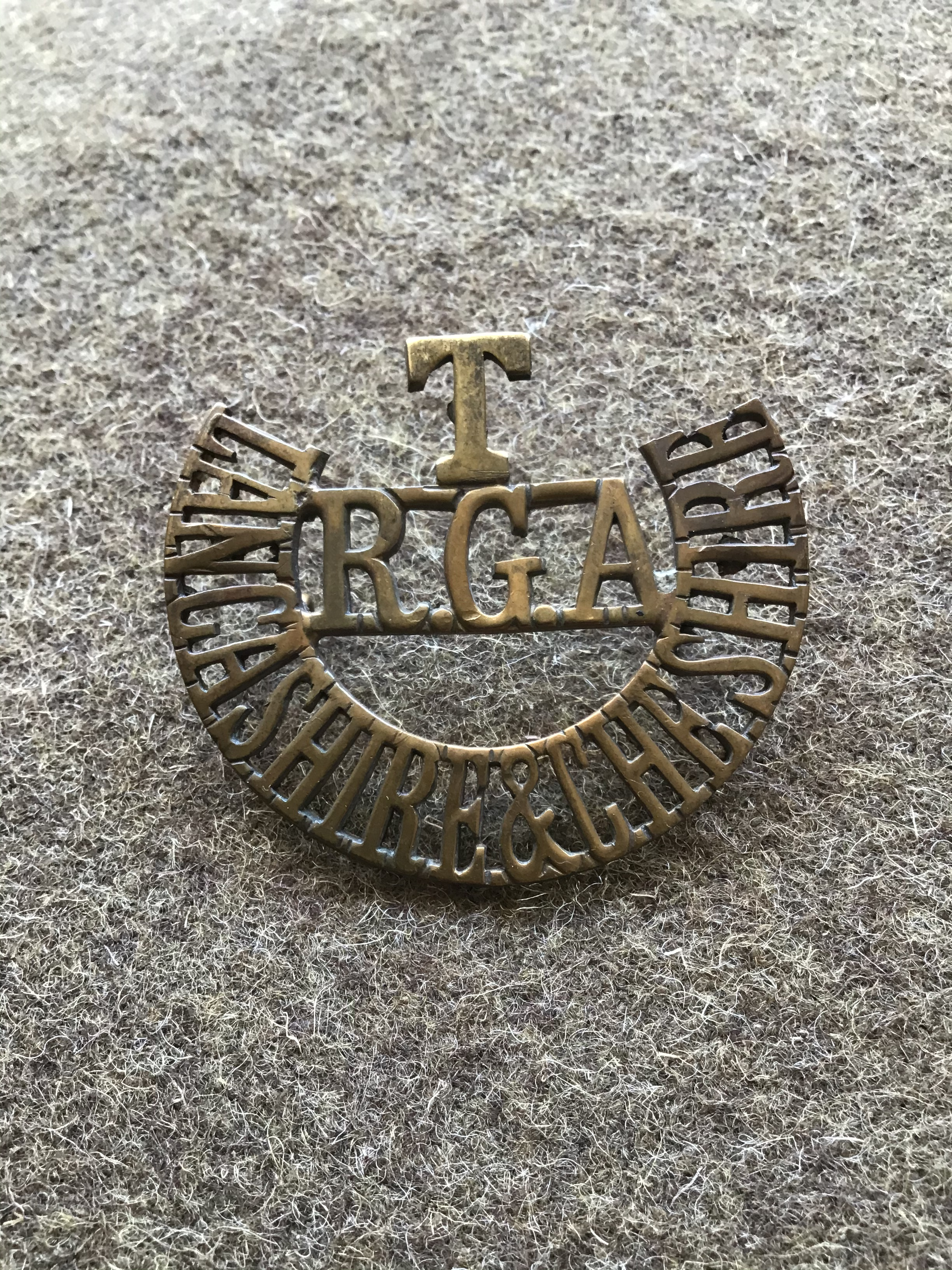
Unit shoulder title.

== Territorial Force ==
Under the Haldane Reforms that created the Territorial Force, the 1st Lancashire RGA (V) merged with part of the 1st Cheshire RGA (V) to become the Lancashire and Cheshire RGA as a defended ports unit. The single command facilitated coordination between the defences on the Lancashire and Cheshire banks of the Mersey Estuary. The Cheshire side included Fort Perch Rock armed with three 6-inch Mark VII BL guns in 1914. There was also a detachment at Barrow-in-Furness defending the shipyards and airship works.

== World War I ==
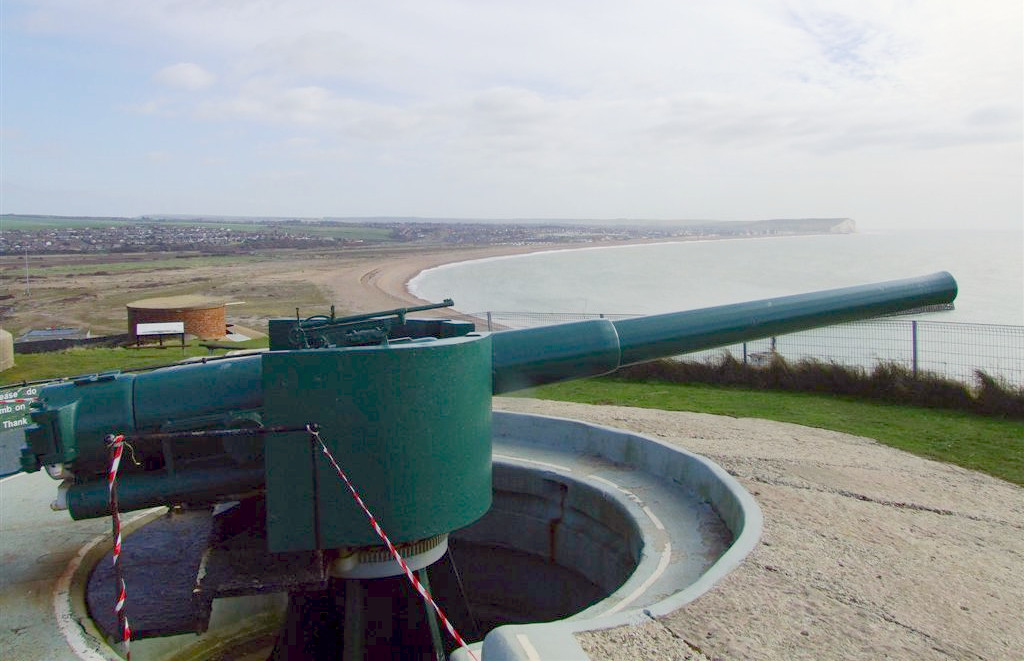
Mk VII 6-inch gun in typical coast defence emplacement, preserved at Newhaven Fort.

=== Mobilisation ===
On the outbreak of World War I the Lancashire & Cheshire RGA's organisation was as follows:

- Nos 1–4 Companies at Drill Hall, 19 Low Hill, Liverpool
- Nos 5 & 6 Companies at Drill Hall, River View Road, Seacombe, Wallasey
- Nos 7 & 8 Companies at Barrow-in-Furness

The companies were manning the following guns:

- Mersey Garrison: 6 x 6-inch, 2 x 4.7-inch
- Barrow Garrison: 2 x 6-inch

On 31 August 1914, the formation of Reserve or 2nd Line units for each existing TF unit was authorised; each was prefixed '2/' to distinguish it from the 1st Line ('1/'). Initially these were formed from men who had not volunteered for overseas service, and the recruits who were flooding in. In 1915 Henry Behrend was re-commissioned from the TF Reserve as Lt-Col to command the 2nd Line unit of the L&C RGA.

=== Home Defence ===
On 29 January 1915, No 7 Company, manning the Walney Island Battery guarding the shipyards and airship sheds at Barrow, exchanged fire with the German U-boat U-21.

By October 1914, the campaign on the Western Front was bogging down into Trench warfare and there was an urgent need for batteries of siege artillery to be sent to France. The WO decided that the TF coastal gunners were well enough trained to take over many of the duties in the coastal defences, releasing Regular RGA gunners for service in the field. Soon the TF RGA companies that had volunteered for overseas service were also supplying trained gunners to RGA units serving overseas. Although complete defended ports units never went overseas, they did provide cadres to form units from New Army ('Kitchener's Army') volunteers for front line service. The L&C RGA is known to have supplied cadres for 39th and 95th Siege Btys in 1915 and 256th in 1916 (see below). Other new siege batteries are recorded to have been raised in 1916 at 'Mersey' (161, 170, 197, 235, 297) and 'Liverpool' (204, 279, 314), and further batteries in early 1917 at the L&C RGA's Crosby Battery (358, 393, 401) and at Mersey (437). These were formed from later conscripts, but were presumably organised by the L&C RGA since there were no Regular RGA units present at these sites.

This process meant a continual drain on the manpower of the defended ports units and in April 1917, the coastal defence companies of the RGA (TF) were reorganised. By this stage of the war, the L&C RGA serving in the Mersey and Barrow Defences of Western Command consisted of 1/1, 1/2, 1/3, 1/5, 2/1, 2/2, 2/3, 2/4, 2/5 and 2/7 Companies. These were reduced to just three companies, given a slightly higher establishment (five officers and 100 other ranks) and renumbered, abolishing the 1st and 2nd Line distinction:

- 1/1 Company became No 1 Company
- 1/3 Company became No 2 Company
- 1/5 Company became No 4 Company

In addition, three L&C companies (1/4, 2/6 and 2/8) had been transferred to the Thames & Medway Defences in Eastern Command – much closer to possible German naval attacks – and these were combined with 1/2 and 2/2 Companies of the Essex & Suffolk RGA to form Nos 1 and 2 Companies of the Kent RGA.

By April 1918 the guns in the Mersey Garrison consisted of one 6-inch at each of Perch Rock and Crosby Point batteries, and two 4.7s at Seaforth, while the Barrow Garrison had two 6-inch Mk VIIs at Walney Island Battery and two 4.7s at Hilpsford Battery, under Coastal Fire Command No 24 at Liverpool.

The TF was demobilised in 1919 after the Armistice with Germany.

=== 39th Siege Battery ===
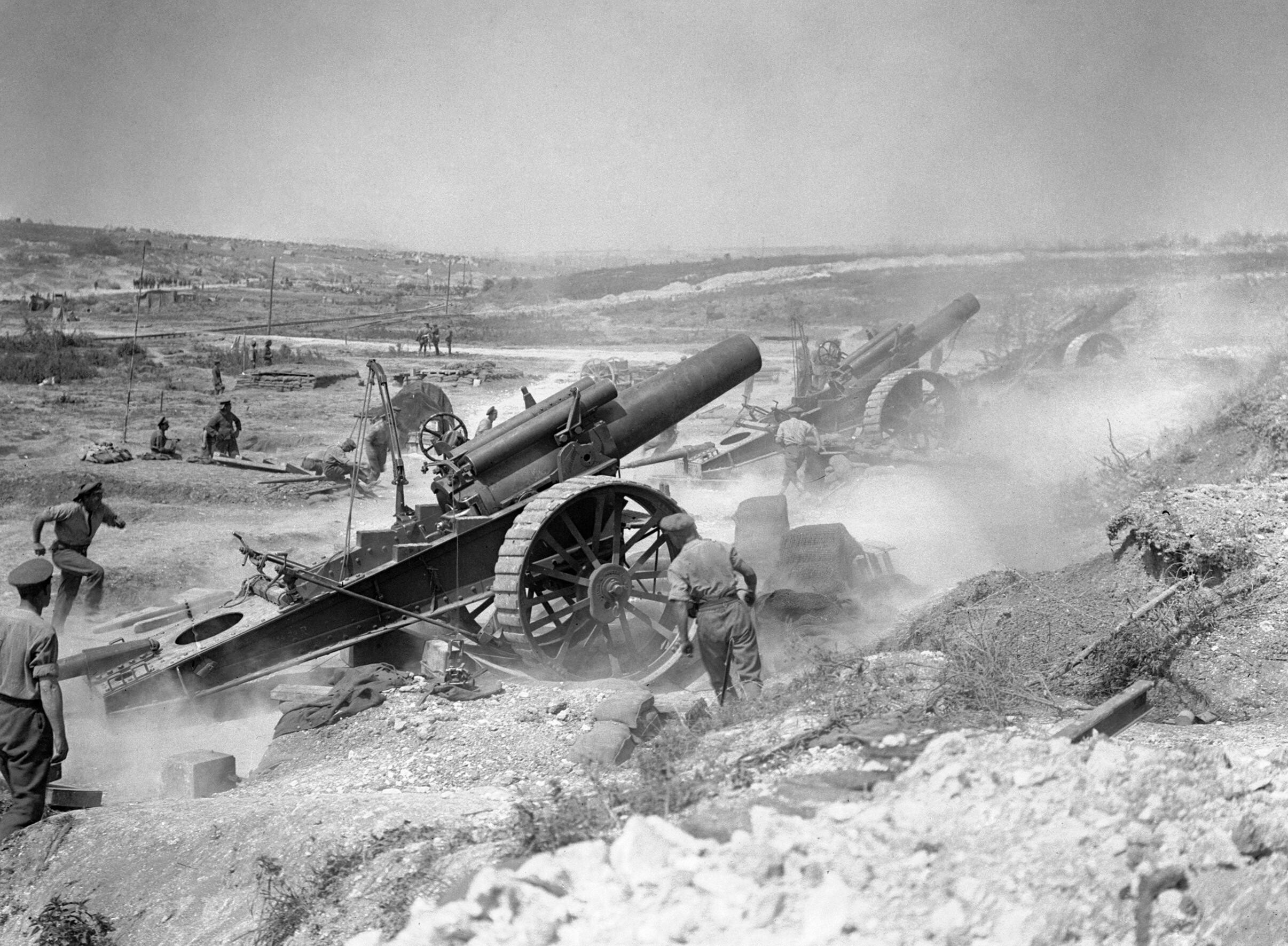
39th Siege Bty during a shoot in the Fricourt-Mametz Valley on the Somme, August 1916.

This battery was formed at Sheerness on 10 June 1915 with a cadre (including Capt G.G. Mallinson) provided by the L&C RGA. The battery went out to the Western Front on 2 November, equipped with four 8-inch howitzers.

39th Siege Bty was positioned north of Ypres under Second Army and spent the following months in the routine of registering likely targets with the aid of spotting aircraft and carrying out short bombardments of requested targets, while suffering a steady trickle of casualties from retaliatory fire. In June 1916 it was sent south to join Fourth Army's preparations for the 'Big Push', the Battle of the Somme.

After participating in the seven-day bombardment, the battery fired a sequence of barrages lifting from one predetermined line to the next in support of III Corps' assault on La Boisselle during the First day on the Somme. Many of the heavy howitzer shells failed to explode. The attack was a failure. The battery continued to support the attacks on Bazentin le Petit and Pozières, then on Le Sars, Martinpuich, High Wood and Courcelette as the offensive continued through the summer and into the autumn.

In January 1917 the battery rejoined Second Army at Ypres where activity increased as preparations began for that year's Flanders campaign. On 1 June 1917 39th Siege Bty was joined by a section (2 officers and 70 other ranks (ORs) with two 8-inch howitzers) from the newly arrived 311th Siege Bty, bringing the battery up to an establishment of six guns. It supported the successful Battle Messines (7 June), then moved to forward positions under Fifth Army for the bombardment preceding the opening of the Third Ypres Offensive on 31 July. It supported II Corps, which had the hardest task of the day, and the attack fell short of its objectives.

Captain Mallinson of the original L&CRGA cadre left the battery on 13 August 1917 to take command of 221st Siege Bty. The campaign ground on during the summer and autumn. During the attack of 20 September (the Battle of the Menin Road Ridge) three of the battery's guns were put out of action. By October the British gunners were struggling to bring up guns and ammunition through the morass of mud to continue the offensive and the gunners of 39th Siege Bty had to be pulled out of the line for rest. They returned later in the month and resumed barrage fire for the Second Battle of Passchendaele until the fighting died down in November.

Having been constantly switched from one heavy artillery group (HAG) to another, the RGA batteries now became subunits of permanent heavy brigades: 39th Siege Bty joined 30th Brigade and remained with it for the rest of the war. The German Spring Offensive was launched at the end of March 1918, but it was not until 10 April that the fighting spread to Ypres. On that day 30th Bde's howitzers were called upon to support the hard-pressed troops south of the city. By 14 April Second Army was obliged to pull back from the Passchendaele Ridge to shorten its line and the guns were dragged back. From their new positions the guns carried out harassing fire (HF) and counter-preparation and disrupt the German attacks until they were forced back to the ramparts of Ypres itself on 26 April, with 39th Siege Bty back at Busseboom. The last German attack in the sector died out on 29 April. In May, 30th Bde was pulled out of the line for rest and training in GHQ Reserve.

On 19 June 39th Siege Bty was back 'in action' north of Arras. 30th Brigade was now under First Army and remained with it until the end of the war. The summer was spent on HF and counter-battery (CB) fire tasks. The Allied Hundred Days Offensive began on 8 August and First Army began to advance on 18 August, supported by CB fire. On 19 September the heavy guns began moving forward to support First Army in the Battle of the Canal du Nord on 27 September. During October, 39th Siege Bty moved up again, reaching Billy-Montigny with five of its howitzers on 13 October, but on 18 October it had to be left behind because there was no canal bridge strong enough to take its heavy howitzers. It finally moved up on 1 November, and four of its howitzers came into action on 4 and 5 November, but the Germans were retreating too quickly for the howitzers to keep up. Hostilities ended on 11 November when the Armistice came into effect.

The battery continued in the Regular Army after the Armistice. It became 39th Bty, RGA, on 19 April 1919, and converted into 39th Mountain Bty on 20 January 1920. However, on 16 April that year it was absorbed by the cadre of 3rd Mountain Bty in India.

=== 95th Siege Battery ===
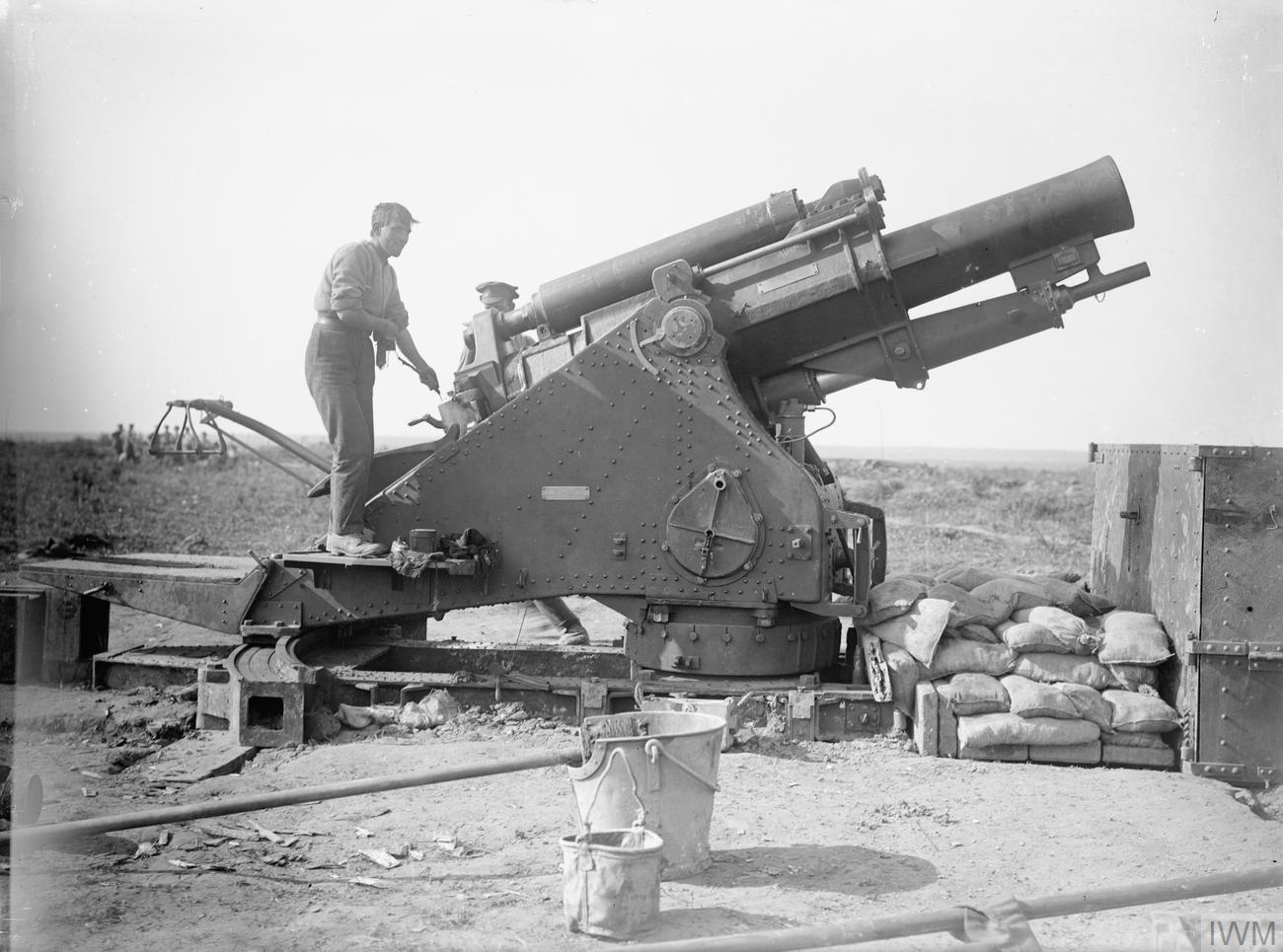
9.2-inch howitzer in action on the Somme, 1916.

This battery was formed at Portsmouth on 16 December 1915 by a cadre of 3 officers and 78 other ranks (the equivalent of a TF Company) drawn from the L&C RGA. It went out to the Western Front in May 1916 equipped with four 9.2-inch howitzers and immediately joined Third Army to begin the bombardment for the disastrous Attack on the Gommecourt Salient on the first day on the Somme. It switched to Fourth Army for the continuation of the Somme offensive, and then moved to First Army. It was with 50th HAG as part of the concentration of heavy guns for the Battle of Vimy on 9 April 1917. Later it moved to Second Army's command for the Battle of Messines and to Fifth Army for the Ypres offensive.

In October 1917 the battery transferred to 90th HAG with Third Army. It supported IV Corps in the continuing operations of the Battle of Cambrai. 90th HAG became 90th Bde in early 1918, and 95th Siege Bty remained with it for the rest of the war. In August 1917 the battery had been joined by a section of gunners from 419th Siege Bty, but it was not increased to six howitzers until January 1918.

Third Army was attacked on the first day of the German Spring Offensive (21 March) and all the batteries of 90th Bde had to be pulled back in the 'Great Retreat'. While the huge 9.2-inch howitzers were towed back, the gunners of 95th Siege Bty fought the advancing Germans with smaller 6-inch howitzers. The front was stabilised in early April and by late August Third Army had joined in the Allied Hundred Days Offensive across the old Somme battlefields. The subsequent advance in September and October entailed 95th Siege Bty hauling its howitzers forward in pairs to new gun positions. 90th Brigade supported 42nd (East Lancashire) Division for the attack on the Canal du Nord on 27 September and was attached to the New Zealand Division for the Second Battle of Cambrai on 8 October. It supported IV Corps' attack at the Battle of the Selle on 20 October. By 5 November the heavy howitzers had been left behind, and the men were in billets by the time the Armistice came into effect.

95th Siege Battery was disbanded during 1919.

=== 256th Siege Battery ===
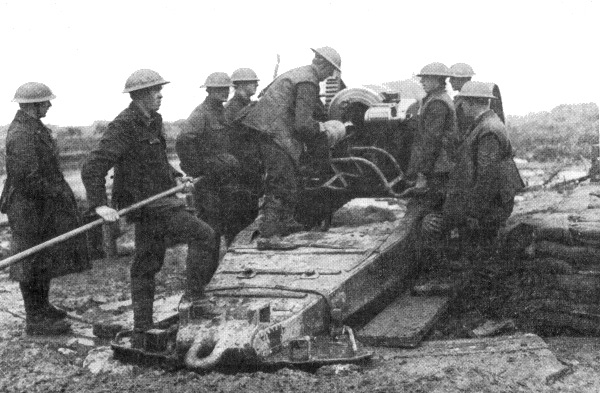
Loading a Vickers 8-inch howitzer.

This battery was formed at Crosby Battery on 13 September 1916 with a cadre of 44 men provided by the L&C RGA, the remainder of the personnel being posted to it from the RGA depot at Clipstone camp. Captain N.N. Maas of the L&C RGA was appointed to command the battery with the rank of Temporary Major. The battery began its training under the supervision of the Commander, Royal Artillery, Mersey Defences, before moving to Aldershot. It was equipped with four Vickers Mark VI 8-inch howitzers and arrived on the Western Front on 6 February 1917.

It served through the Battle of Arras with Third Army, suffering severely from enemy counter-battery fire. It was made up to a strength of six howitzers in June 1917 with personnel from the newly-arrived 344th Siege Bty. It then served through the latter weeks of the bloody Battle of Passchendaele with 47th HAG under Fifth Army. In January 1918 it became a permanent part of 40th Bde, which was in GHQ Reserve at the time.

When the Germans launched their Spring Offensive 40th Bde was sent from GHQ Reserve to reinforce Third Army as it halted the German advance in front of Arras at the end of March. Trench warfare then set in once more, but at the end of July 40th Bde moved to join Fourth Army as it launched the Hundred Days Offensive with the Battle of Amiens on 8 August. The batteries supported Canadian Corps in that battle, and as the lighter howitzers moved up in the pursuit, the gunners of 256th Siege Bty took over and operated some captured German guns. 40th Brigade then supported French troops in the area before moving north to rejoin Canadian Corps in First Army for the Battle of the Drocourt-Quéant Switch Line. The battery was involved in the Battle of the Canal du Nord and a few subsequent operations, but after 18 October was left behind as the pursuit of the beaten Germans accelerated.

Major Maas commanded the battery throughout its service, and during 1918 and 1919 often deputised as acting commander of 40th Brigade. 295th Siege Battery was disbanded during 1919.

== Interwar years ==
When the TF was reconstituted on 7 February 1920, the Lancashire & Cheshire RGA was reformed, with its HQ at Liverpool and two batteries, one from Nos 1 and 2 companies, the other from Nos 3 and 4. During 1921 the TF was reorganised as the Territorial Army and the unit was redesignated the Lancashire & Cheshire Coast Brigade, RGA, the batteries being numbered 177 and 178. When the RGA was subsumed into the RA on 1 June 1924, the unit became the Lancashire & Cheshire Heavy Brigade, RA, and the batteries became heavy batteries. In 1926 it was decided that the coastal defences of Great Britain should be solely manned by part-time soldiers of the TA. Together with the Lancashire Fortress Royal Engineers the brigade provided the coast defence troops in 55th (West Lancashire) Divisional Area.

During the 1930s until the eve of World War II the organisation of the L&C Heavy Bde was:

- HQ Bty, Drill Hall, Everton Road, Liverpool
- 177 Hvy Bty, Drill Hall, Everton Road, Liverpool
- 178 Hvy Bty, Drill Hall, Riverview Road, Seacombe, Wallasey
- Lancashire & Cheshire Anti-Aircraft Cadet Bty

In line with the RA's modernisation of its titles, the brigade was termed a regiment from 1 November 1938. On the outbreak of war on 3 September 1939 it was responsible for the following guns:

- Mersey: 4 x 6-inch
- Barrow: 2 x 6-inch

== World War II ==
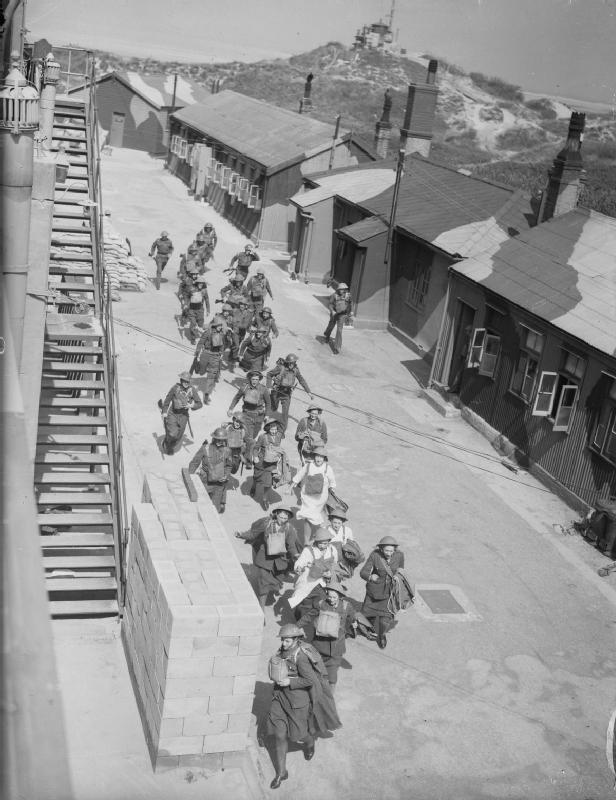
Auxiliary Territorial Service girls and gunners of 177 Bty rush to 'take post' at Fort Crosby in 1940.

=== 524th (Lancashire & Cheshire) Coast Regiment ===
With the danger of invasion after the British Expeditionary Force was evacuated from Dunkirk, the coastal artillery regiments underwent a major reorganisation in the summer of 1940. On 14 July the regiment became 524th (Lancashire & Cheshire) Coast Regiment with the batteries designated A and B:

- Regimental HQ – in Mersey Fire Command
- A Bty – at Crosby Battery, became 111 Bty 1 April 1941; Perch Rock by 2 May 1942
- B Bty – at Perch Rock Battery; in WO Reserve as an 'Examination Bty' by March 1941, became 109 Bty 1 April, transferred to Shornemead Fort in 517th (Thames & Medway) Coast Rgt 23 October 1941
- 404 Bty – at Lytham St Annes, joined 31 December 1940, transferred to 541st Coast Rgt 12 August 1941
- 405 Bty – at Fleetwood, joined 31 December 1940
- 208 Bty – at Perch Rock, joined 26 January 1941, transferred to Hoxa in 533rd (Orkney) Coast Rgt 25 February 1941
- 112 Bty – at Crosby, 4-inch battery formed within regiment 25 February 1941, disbanded 10 October 1942
- 171 Bty – at Lytham, independent battery temporarily attached from Home Forces 16 July 1941, regimented 10 August 1941
- 189 Bty – temporarily attached from Home Forces 11 August 1941, transferred to 531st (Glamorgan) Coast Rgt 20 October 1941
- 357 Bty – at Perch Rock, joined from 517th (Thames & Medway) Coast Rgt 23 October 1941; transferred to 532nd (Pembroke) Coast Rgt 2 May 1942
- 131 Bty – at Crosby, joined from 532nd (Pembroke) Coast Rgt 2 May 1942

The batteries at Fleetwood and Lytham St Annes were 'emergency batteries' of Royal Navy guns installed during the summer of 1940. Each consisted of 2 x 4-inch Mk VII guns.

By 1942 the threat from German attack had diminished and there was demand for trained gunners for the fighting fronts. A process of reducing the manpower in the coast defences began. The manpower requirements for the forthcoming Allied invasion of Normandy (Operation Overlord) led to further reductions in coast defences in April 1944. By this stage of the war many of the coast battery positions were manned by Home Guard detachments or in the hands of care and maintenance parties.

=== 619th (Lancashire & Cheshire) Infantry Regiment ===
By the end of 1944, 21st Army Group was suffering a severe manpower shortage, particularly among the infantry. At the same time the German Luftwaffe and Reichsmarine were suffering from such shortages that serious attacks on the United Kingdom could be discounted. In January 1945 the War Office began to reorganise surplus air and coast defence regiments in the UK into infantry battalions, primarily for line of communication and occupation duties in North West Europe, thereby releasing trained infantry for frontline service. On 15 January 1945 the bulk of 524th (L&C) Coast Rgt became 619th (Lancashire & Cheshire) Infantry Rgt, RA, in 301 Infantry Brigade, serving in Scottish Command. After infantry training, the brigade came under the orders of 21st Army Group on 9 May, and landed on the Continent on 15 May (a week after VE Day), where it came under the command of First Canadian Army. After carrying out occupation duties it was placed in suspended animation on 31 October 1945.

Meanwhile, a few details of RHQ 524th (L&C) Coast Rgt had been retained in the UK. On 29 February 131 Bty became independent, and the residue of 111, 171 and 405 Btys came under its administrative control on 20 May. RHQ, 131 Bty and the other details began entering suspended animation on 1 June, completing the process by 22 June 1945.

== Postwar ==
In 1947 the regiment was reconstituted in the TA as 420 (Lancashire and Cheshire) Coast Regiment, as part of 104 Coast Brigade. In 1954 the batteries were subtitled: Q (Lancashire) and R (Cheshire). Two years later the Coast Artillery were disbanded. Q and R Batteries of 420 Regiment were converted into 253 and 624 Squadrons of the Royal Engineers at Liverpool and Wallasey respectively. Originally they were to be field squadrons, but this was quickly changed and they became crane operating squadrons attached to 107 Corps Engineer Rgt and 113 Army Engineer Rgt respectively. Both squadrons were disbanded in 1961.

== Honorary Colonels ==
The following served as Honorary Colonel of the unit:

- Sir William Brown, 1st Baronet of Richmond Hill, died 1864
- Sir William Richmond Brown, 2nd Baronet, appointed 1866
- Sir Alexander Brown, 1st Baronet of Broome Hall, VD, appointed 1888
- Edward Stanley, 17th Earl of Derby, KG, GCB, GCVO, TD, appointed 1921

== Other notable members ==
- The Behrend family of the oldest shipbroking firm in Liverpool, Bahr, Behrend & Co, several of whom served in the 1st LAV, including Lt-Col H.D. Behrend, who came out of retirement to command the 2nd Line L&C RGA during World War I.
- Maj-Gen Sir Claude Liardet (1881-1966), an insurance broker, was commissioned into the 1st LAV in 1899 and had reached the rank of major by 1914. In World War I he commanded and took to France a battery of 60-pounder guns and was awarded a Distinguished Service Order. At the outbreak of World War II he was commander of 56th (London) Division – the first TA officer to hold a divisional command – and in 1942 he became the first Commandant of the RAF Regiment.

== Notes ==
- Maj A.F. Becke,History of the Great War: Order of Battle of Divisions, Part 2b: The 2nd-Line Territorial Force Divisions (57th–69th), with the Home-Service Divisions (71st–73rd) and 74th and 75th Divisions, London: HM Stationery Office, 1937/Uckfield: Naval & Military Press, 2007, ISBN 1-847347-39-8.
- Ian F.W. Beckett, Riflemen Form: A Study of the Rifle Volunteer Movement 1859–1908, Aldershot: Ogilby Trusts, 1982, ISBN 0 85936 271 X.
- Arthur F. Behrend, Nine Days: Adventures of a Heavy Artillery Brigade of the Third Army during the German Offensive of March 21–29, 1918, 2nd Edn, Cambridge: Heffers, 1921/Uckfield: Naval & Military Press, 2009, ISBN 978-1847349811.
- Burke's Peerage, Baronetage and Knightage, 100th Edn, London, 1953.
- Basil Collier, History of the Second World War, United Kingdom Military Series: The Defence of the United Kingdom, London: HM Stationery Office, 1957/Uckfield: Naval & Military, 2004, ISBN 978-1-84574-055-9.
- Brig-Gen Sir James E. Edmonds, History of the Great War: Military Operations, France and Belgium, 1916, Vol I, London: Macmillan,1932/Woking: Shearer, 1986, ISBN 0-946998-02-7.
- Brig-Gen Sir James E. Edmonds, History of the Great War: Military Operations, France and Belgium 1918, Vol II, March–April: Continuation of the German Offensives, London: Macmillan, 1937/Imperial War Museum and Battery Press, 1995, ISBN 1-87042394-1/Uckfield: Naval & Military Press, 2009, ISBN 978-1-84574-726-8.
- Brig-Gen Sir James E. Edmonds, History of the Great War: Military Operations, France and Belgium 1918, Vol IV, 8th August–26th September: The Franco-British Offensive, London: Macmillan, 1939/Uckfield: Imperial War Museum and Naval & Military, 2009, ISBN 978-1-845747-28-2.
- Brig-Gen Sir James E. Edmonds & Lt-Col R. Maxwell-Hyslop, History of the Great War: Military Operations, France and Belgium 1918, Vol V, 26th September–11th November, The Advance to Victory, London: HM Stationery Office, 1947/Imperial War Museum and Battery Press, 1993, ISBN 1-870423-06-2.
- Maj L.F. Ellis, History of the Second World War, United Kingdom Military Series: Victory in the West, Vol II: The Defeat of Germany, London: HM Stationery Office, 1968/Uckfield: Naval & Military, 2004, ISBN 1-845740-59-9.
- Gen Sir Martin Farndale, History of the Royal Regiment of Artillery: Western Front 1914–18, Woolwich: Royal Artillery Institution, 1986, ISBN 1-870114-00-0.
- Gen Sir Martin Farndale, History of the Royal Regiment of Artillery: The Forgotten Fronts and the Home Base 1914–18, Woolwich: Royal Artillery Institution, 1988, ISBN 1-870114-05-1.
- Gen Sir Martin Farndale, History of the Royal Regiment of Artillery: The Years of Defeat: Europe and North Africa, 1939–1941, Woolwich: Royal Artillery Institution, 1988/London: Brasseys, 1996, ISBN 1-85753-080-2.
- J.B.M. Frederick, Lineage Book of British Land Forces 1660–1978, Vol II, Wakefield: Microform Academic, 1984, ISBN 1-85117-009-X.
- Joslen, H. F. (2003) [1960]. Orders of Battle: Second World War, 1939–1945. Uckfield, East Sussex: Naval and Military Press. ISBN 978-1-84342-474-1.
- Norman Litchfield & Ray Westlake, The Volunteer Artillery 1859–1908 (Their Lineage, Uniforms and Badges), Nottingham: Sherwood Press, 1982, ISBN 0-9508205-0-4.
- Norman E.H. Litchfield, The Territorial Artillery 1908–1988 (Their Lineage, Uniforms and Badges), Nottingham: Sherwood Press, 1992, ISBN 0-9508205-2-0.
- Alan MacDonald, Pro Patria Mori: The 56th (1st London) Division at Gommecourt, 1st July 1916, 2nd Edn, West Wickham: Iona Books, 2008, ISBN 978-0-9558119-1-3.
- Alan MacDonald, A Lack of Offensive Spirit? The 46th (North Midland) Division at Gommecourt, 1st July 1916, West Wickham: Iona Books, 2008, ISBN 978-0-9558119-0-6.
- Col K. W. Maurice-Jones, The History of Coast Artillery in the British Army, London: Royal Artillery Institution, 1959/Uckfield: Naval & Military Press, 2005, ISBN 978-1-845740-31-3.
- Ian Stevenson, Mersey Defences, at PFS.
- Instructions Issued by The War Office During October, 1914, London: HM Stationery Office, 1917.
- Instructions Issued by The War Office During December, 1915, London: HM Stationery Office, 1919.
- War Office, Army Council Instructions Issued During April 1917, London: HM Stationery Office.
- War Office, Titles and Designations of Formations and Units of the Territorial Army, London: War Office, 7 November 1927 (RA sections also summarised in Litchfield, Appendix IV).
- Graham E. Watson & Richard A. Rinaldi, The Corps of Royal Engineers: Organization and Units 1889–2018, Tiger Lily Books, 2018, ISBN 978-171790180-4.

== External sources ==
- British Army units from 1945 on Archived 29 August 2015 at the Wayback Machine
- Great War Forum
- Lancashire Record Office, Handlist 72: Sources for the History of the Militia and Volunteer Regiments in Lancashire.
- 'Merseyside Roll of Honour Part 22', Liverpool Courier 24 June 1919.
- Palmerston Forts Society
- Orders of Battle at Patriot Files Archived 26 March 2023 at the Wayback Machine
- Royal Artillery 1939–45
- Graham Watson, The Territorial Army 1947 Archived 9 December 2021 at the Wayback Machine
