= 256th Siege Battery, Royal Garrison Artillery =

256th Siege Battery, RGA
- Cap Badge of the Royal Regiment of Artillery
- Active: 13 September 1916–1919
- Country: United Kingdom
- Branch: British Army
- Role: Siege Artillery fire
- Part of: Royal Garrison Artillery
- Garrison/HQ: Crosby Battery
- Colors: green
- Engagements: Battle of Arras; Battle of Passchendaele; German Spring Offensive; Battle of Amiens; Battle of Albert; Battle of Drocourt-Quéant Line; Battle of the Canal du Nord; Forcing of the Rouvroy–Fresnes Line

The 256th Siege Battery was a heavy howitzer unit of Britain's Royal Garrison Artillery (RGA) raised during World War I. It saw active service on the Western Front from early 1917 to the Armistice in 1918, participating in the battles of Arras and Passchendaele, against the German Spring Offensive, and in the final Allied Hundred Days Offensive.

== Mobilisation and training ==
On the outbreak of war in August 1914, units of the part-time Territorial Force (TF) were invited to volunteer for Overseas Service, and most of the Liverpool-based Lancashire and Cheshire Royal Garrison Artillery (L&CRGA) did so. By October 1914, the campaign on the Western Front was bogging down into Trench warfare and there was an urgent need for batteries of siege artillery to be sent to France. The WO decided that the TF coastal gunners were well enough trained to take over many of the duties in the coastal defences, releasing Regular Army RGA gunners for service in the field, Soon the TF RGA companies that had volunteered for overseas service were also supplying trained gunners to RGA units serving overseas and providing cadres to form complete units with 'New Army' (Kitchener's Army) volunteers.

256th Siege Bty was formed at Crosby Battery, Hightown, near Liverpool, on 13 September 1916 with a cadre of 44 men provided by the L&CRGA, the remainder of the personnel being posted to it from the RGA depot at Clipstone camp. Captain N.N. Maas of the L&CRGA was appointed to command the battery with the rank of Temporary Major.

The battery began its training under the supervision of the Commander, Royal Artillery, Mersey Defences, then on 20 November moved to North Camp at Aldershot, where it was accommodated in Tournay Barracks. At Aldershot it was joined by 22 signallers from the training depot at Catterick Camp. On 8 January it moved to the RGA training camp at Lydd, then on 19 January it went to Charlton Park, near Woolwich, where it was equipped with four Vickers Mark VI 8-inch howitzers and mobilised for overseas service. The guns, lorries and Holt 75 caterpillar gun tractors went to Portsmouth on 6 February for shipping to France aboard SS Huntscape, and the rest of the battery embarked at Folkestone Harbour on 8 February, landing at Boulogne the same afternoon.

== Service ==
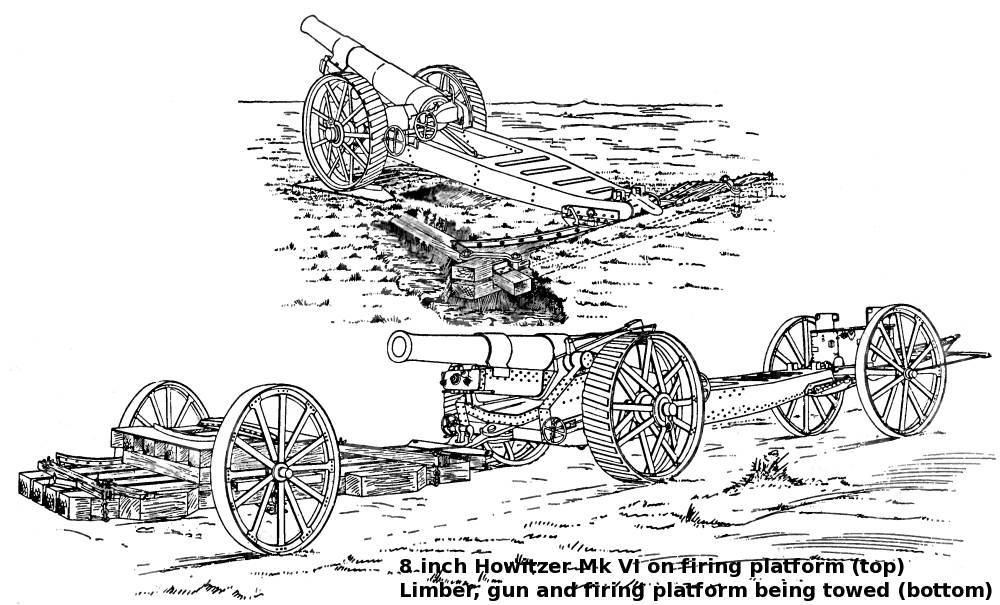
Diagram of the 8-inch Howitzer Mk VI, with its limber and firing platform.

On arrival in France the battery, with the drivers of 153rd Heavy Artillery Motor Transport Section, Army Service Corps (ASC), went by rail and road to Le Hamel, where they first joined 65th Heavy Artillery Group (HAG) in VI Corps' Heavy Artillery under Third Army but transferred on 18 February to 22nd HAG. The battery was assigned gun positions along the avenue of a chateau near St Vaast which had previously been used by a battery of 9.2-inch howitzers and required little modification. The officers and men were billeted in the chateau. Preparations were completed and the battery fired its first registration rounds, with aircraft observation, on 24 March. For the rest of the month it continued registration shoots, carried out its first Counter-battery (CB) task, and bombarded enemy trenches in the Tilloy-lès-Mofflaines area.

=== Arras ===
Third Army was preparing for its Spring Offensive (the Battle of Arras). The main bombardment was planned to last for five days (V, W, X, Y and Z) beginning on 4 April. Given the mass of guns firing, the area bombarded was divided into small zones without overlapping fire, to help the forward obersvation officers spot the fall of shot of their own guns. However, visibility was poor on some of the days, so an additional day (Q) was inserted on 7 April and Z day for the attack (the First Battle of the Scarpe) became 9 April. 256th Siege Bty's tasks were to bombard the villages of Feuchy and Fampoux, as well as the Tilloy trenches and continuing CB fire. The attack went in at 05.30 on 9 April and VI Corps had captured Orange Hill and the Wancourt–Feuchy lines by nightfall, an advance of 5,000 yards (4,600 m). 256th Siege Bty was not required to fire after 13.30 until almost 23.00, when it resumed fire on German rear trenches to break up potential counter-attacks. It only fired a few rounds on 10 April and next day moved forward to Blangy, later moving to the mill at Athies. From these it fired on Guemappe, Pelves, 'Cavalry Farm' and St Rohart Factory as the offensive continued. After the early successes Third Army's progress slowed. The battery began suffering a few casualties as the Germans brought up artillery reinforcements. On 25 April, after it had only fired a few rounds, it came under intense enemy CB fire: one officer, the battery quartermaster-sergeant and eight other ranks (ORs) were killed or died of wounds, and another five were wounded. After that experience the battery moved out the next day, only firing to clear its loaded guns, and then went to Feuchy. It began re-registering its guns, but was still under shellfire and suffered a few more casualties. 1 May was X Day for a new operation (the Third Battle of the Scarpe, 3 May), a confused night attack that failed with heavy casualties to the attacking infantry. The attack on the chemical works at Rœux on 13–14 May was more successful. The battery continued firing on enemy trenches and batteries as the offensive drew to a close.

The battery was made up to a strength of six howitzers with personnel from 344th Siege Bty joining on 10 June 1917 and the additional 8-inch howitzers arriving on 28 June. 344th Siege Bty had arrived on the Western Front on 31 May but was immediately broken up: Left Section went to VI corps and was assigned to 256th Siege Bty, even though the gunners had trained to be a 6-inch howitzer battery. On 30 June 22nd HAG HQ moved away and next day the battery was transferred to 68th HAG, which was the Southern CB Group with the neighbouring XVII Corps, but the ground over which it was shooting remained the same. On 10 July 256th Siege Bty came under heavy shellfire, with four men killed and two guns put out of action. Later that day every battery in XVII Corps fired a retaliatory salvo onto a suspected hostile gun position. During the summer the guns continued CB work when weather permitted observation, and supported minor operations against the Hindenburg Line by 12th (Eastern) and 17th (Northern) Divisions

=== Ypres ===
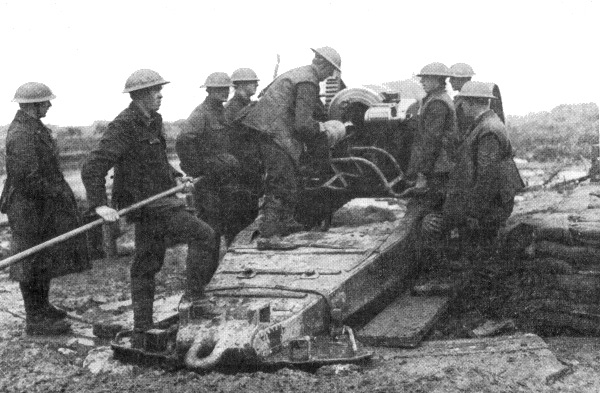
Loading a Vickers 8-inch howitzer.

On 28 September the personnel of the battery entrained without their guns to join XVIII Corps with Fifth Army, which was heavily engaged in the Third Ypres Offensive. The battery came under 47th HAG and next day took over the 8-inch howitzers of 262nd Siege Bty, who were being sent for rest. Fifth Army. 47th HAG's batteries were along the Canal Bank at Ypres and were regularly fired upon: 256th Siege Bty was heavily shelled on 1 October. It was hit again on 4 October, during the Battle of Broodseinde, while engaged in neutralising enemy batteries, and lost seven killed and one officer and 14 wounded, but the gun detachments remained at their posts. Although Broodseinde was a success, XVIII Corps was unable to advance during the next attack (the Battle of Poelcappelle) on 9 October, because of the state of the ground. By the time the attack was renewed on 12 October (the First Battle of Passchendaele) guns and ammunition were sinking in the mud, bombardments were thin and inaccurate, and CB fire had almost ceased, while the gunners continued to suffer casualties from enemy high explosive (HE) and gas shelling. XVII Corps attacked again on 22 and 30 October (the Second Battle of Passchendaele), but the infantry struggling through the mud failed to take their objectives. By the end of the month 256th Siege Bty had succeeded in getting two howitzers forward to shorten the range. Second Army's II Corps took over from XVIII Corps on 2 November, with a renewed emphasis on CB fire. 47th HAG's were in support of Canadian Corps for its attacks of 6 and 10 November, firing concentrations on hostile batteries. The capture of Passchendaele Ridge by the Canadians marked the end of the offensive.

=== Winter 1917–18 ===
As the fighting died down, the guns continued harassing fire (HF) tasks, and on 16 November broke up a German counter-attack. On 18 November 215th and 256th Siege Btys began to hand over their positions to 145th and 193rd Siege Btys, whose new Mk VIII 8-inch howitzers had longer range than the Mk VI model. The two relieved batteries transferred to XIV Corps' Heavy Artillery on 22 November and went to 'Casablanca Farm' near Boesinghe to join 23rd HAG, bringing their guns up by Decauville Railway. Some firing was carried out during the winter, when visibility permitted. On 23 January 1918 the battery went into reserve and was assigned to 40th HAG, which was in rest billets at Bambecque.

By now HAG allocations were becoming more fixed, and during December 1917 they were converted into permanent RGA brigades. For the rest of the war the battery was the heaviest element in 40th (8-inch Howitzer) Brigade, RGA, along with three 6-inch howitzer batteries. During January the battery underwent training, then on 6 February 40th Bde took over from 93rd Bde doing CB work. But on 24 February the brigade pulled out again and went into GHQ reserve.

=== Spring Offensive ===
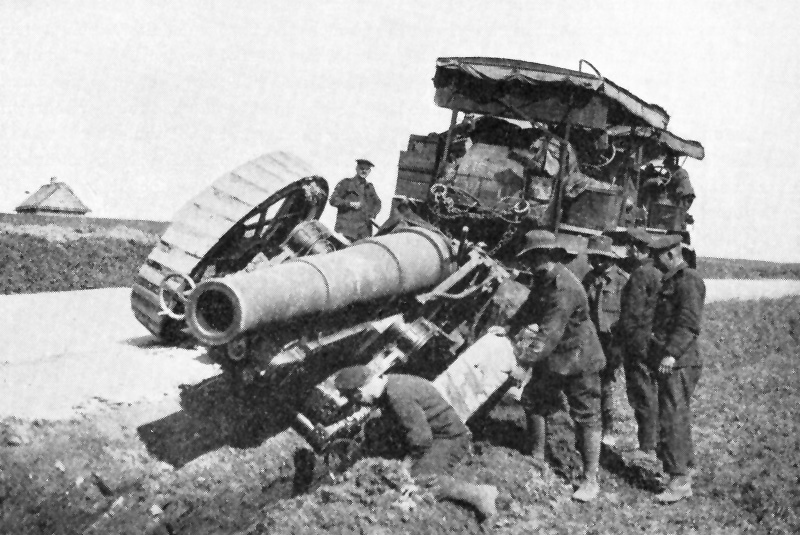
A ditched 8-inch howitzer.

The Germans launched their Spring Offensive on 21 March and achieved considerable success against Fifth and Third Armies. The whole of 40th Bde entrained at Poperinghe on 23 March to reinforce Fifth Army, but was diverted en route to join Third Army, and detrained at Candas. Next day it marched to Hardacq and joined XVII Corps, and then on 26 March its batteries took up positions south of Arras. At first they were out of range, but another German advance on 27 March brought them within range. The batteries began HF shoots on roads, and achieved some good bursts on hostile batteries. The Germans in this sector were halted at the Third Battle of Arras (28 March) when their attacks were shattered by artillery fire. Over the following days 40th Bde's batteries continued firing on hostile batteries, the Cambrai road, and on reports of German troops massing for new attacks. However, none came, and indeed the British infantry recovered some of the lost ground. Although the offensive continued, the Germans switched their main efforts to other sectors.

On 11 April 256th Siege Bty pushed a forward section out to Blangy, where it had been stationed a year before. On 17 April the battery was heavily shelled with gas, as a result of which six officers and 14 ORs had to be evacuated. Raids carried out by 15th (Scottish) Division, 56th (1/1st London) Division and the New Zealand Division kept the corps front active, and 40th Bde's batteries were firing by day and night. On 26 April orders came to rest the gunners except for a few important shoots, such as one on 28 April to assist the neighbouring Canadian Corps. In May the batteries renewed their HF and CB shoots with the assistance of observation aircraft and Kite balloons, and, in the case of 256th Siege Bty, with a Sound Ranging section. Trench raids became frequent during June and July as the British infantry gained ascendancy over the sector.

=== Hundred Days Offensive ===
On 17–18 July 40th Bde and its batteries were relieved by 3rd Canadian Heavy Artillery Brigade and went into GHQ Reserve in and around Avesnes. At the end of the month it left to join Fourth Army. The batteries came into action in Gentelles Wood on 2 August.

Fourth Army launched the Allies' final Hundred Days Offensive on 8 August with the Battle of Amiens. 40th Brigade supported Canadian Corps. The heavy batteries remained hidden and silent until Zero hour, so no registration could be carried out, relying instead on the Field Survey Section to lay the guns accurately on their targets. The attack went in at 04.20. The advance by infantry and tanks was rapid, and the German artillery withdrew rather than replying to the overwhelming fire. Brigade HQ and the lighter 6-inch batteries began moving forward in the afternoon. 256th Siege Bty moved its 8-inch howitzers up to Beaucourt on 10 August, taking up positions of readiness. Next day CB shoots resumed, and the brigade fired a concentration on Fresnoy-lès-Roye, as well as responding to SOS calls from the infantry. 256th Siege Bty was bombed that night, and so moved a short distance away and came back to readiness at Beaufort next day. On 14 August the battery moved its gun platforms forward, ready to bring the guns in when required. While waiting, the gunners were sent up to join Lieutenant-Colonel Curteis of 83rd Bde who had been gathering together captured German guns and ammunition. 256th manned a battery of 'Five-Nines' (5.9-inch or 150 mm guns (Note: Probably 15 cm sFH 13s.)) and all the ad hoc batteries put in good work, despite the lack of proper range tables for the guns. 256th Siege Bty brought its own guns up into position on 17 August, and joined 40th Bde in supporting minor actions. The Canadian Corps was now relieved by the French XXXI Corps, and 40th Bde came temporarily under its command, firing heavy concentrations during the Battle of Albert (23 August) and the capture of Fresnoy on 26 August.

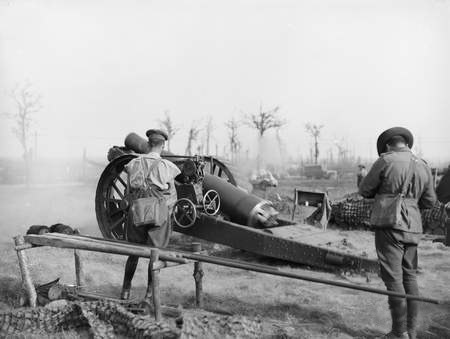
8-inch howitzer at almost full recoil.

40th Brigade pulled out its guns on 27 August. Major Maas of 256th Siege Bty took temporary command while the brigade commander went on leave. The batteries marched to Cagny and entrained for Acq, near Arras, where 40th Bde rejoined Canadian Corps, which had transferred to First Army. The batteries arrived on 1 September, and next day the Canadians assaulted the Drocourt–Quéant (D–Q) Switch Line, for which the howitzers laid a barrage onto the first objective. This was swiftly taken, and the Canadians achieved an advance of up to 4 miles (6.4 km). Next day 40th Bde was transferred to the neighbouring XXII Corps for CB work.

The Germans had retreated to the Canal du Nord and there was a pause as the Allies prepared for a coordinated series of attacks at the end of the month. First Army first had to carry out minor operations to approach the main German defences, and 49th (West Riding) Division attacked with the support of 40th Bde on 21 and 22 September to gain ground in front of Gavrelle and close up to the Rouvroy–Fresne Switch. The howitzers continued with CB fire and concentrations on the fortified villages in front. First Army launched the Battle of the Canal du Nord on 27 September. Canadian Corps carried out the main assault, supported by 56th (1/1st London) Division of XXII Corps working along both banks of the canal, the other divisions only making a feint attack. Most of XXII Corps' support came from its artillery, with 40th Bde contributing 13 hours of CB fire.

Over the succeeding days the guns continued firing their CB and HF tasks as 40th Bde came under the command of VIII Corps. On 7–8 October 8th Division forced the Rouvroy–Fresnes Line after 256th Siege Bty had provided harassing fire by night and day, particularly on the Gavrelle–Rœux road. On 10 October the battery carried out barbed wire-cutting on the remains of the D-Q line. and next day 8th Division took Vitry and the D–Q positions with very few casualties. First Army continued pressing forward: on 17 October 8th Division liberated Douai. The campaign was turning into a pursuit of the defeated Germans, but it was almost impossible to haul the heavy howitzers and their ammunition forward where the retreating enemy had destroyed roads and bridges. While the lighter 6-inch howitzers of 40th Bde kept going and took part in the Battle of the Selle, 256th Siege Bty moved into Vitry on 18 October and parked its 8-inch howitzers; its fighting was over. Hostilities ended on 11 November when the Armistice with Germany came into force.

40th Brigade went into billets around Bouteau; 256th Siege Bty caught up with it on 22 November, and billeted at Le Hennoy. They remained here during the winter and demobilisation began in January 1919. Major Maas assumed temporary command of the brigade once more. Demobilisation rapidly reduced the batteries to cadre strength and these returned to the UK for disbandment in May.

The Commonwealth War Graves Commission lists 48 men of the battery who died during the war.
