= Lancashire Division, Royal Artillery =

Lancashire Division, RA
- Cap Badge of the Royal Regiment of Artillery
- Active: 4 April 1882–1 July 1889
- Country: United Kingdom
- Branch: British Army
- Type: Administrative division
- Part of: Royal Artillery
- Garrison/HQ: Liverpool

The Lancashire Division, Royal Artillery, was an administrative grouping of garrison units of the Royal Artillery, Artillery Militia and Artillery Volunteers within the British Army's Northern District from 1882 to 1889.

== Organisation ==
Under General Order 72 of 4 April 1882 the Royal Artillery (RA) broke up its existing administrative brigades (Note: In RA terminology, a 'brigade' was a group of independent batteries grouped together for administrative rather than tactical purposes, the officer in command being usually a lieutenant-colonel rather than a brigadier-general or major-general, the ranks usually associated with command of an infantry or cavalry brigade.) of garrison artillery (7th–11th Brigades, RA) and assigned the individual batteries to 11 new territorial divisions. These divisions were purely administrative and recruiting organisations, not field formations. Most were formed within the existing military districts into which the United Kingdom was divided, and for the first time associated the part-time Artillery Militia with the regulars. Shortly afterwards the Artillery Volunteers were also added to the territorial divisions. The Regular Army batteries were grouped into one brigade, usually of nine sequentially-numbered batteries and a depot battery. For these units the divisions represented recruiting districts – batteries could be serving anywhere in the British Empire and their only connection to brigade headquarters (HQ) was for the supply of drafts and recruits. The artillery militia units (sometimes referred to as regiments) already comprised a number of batteries, and were redesignated as brigades, losing their county titles in the process. The artillery volunteers, which had previously consisted of numerous independent Artillery Volunteer Corps (AVC) of various sizes, sometimes grouped into administrative brigades, had been consolidated into larger AVCs in 1881, which were now affiliated to the appropriate territorial division.

== Composition ==
Lancashire Division, RA, listed second in order of precedence, was organised within Northern District with the following composition:

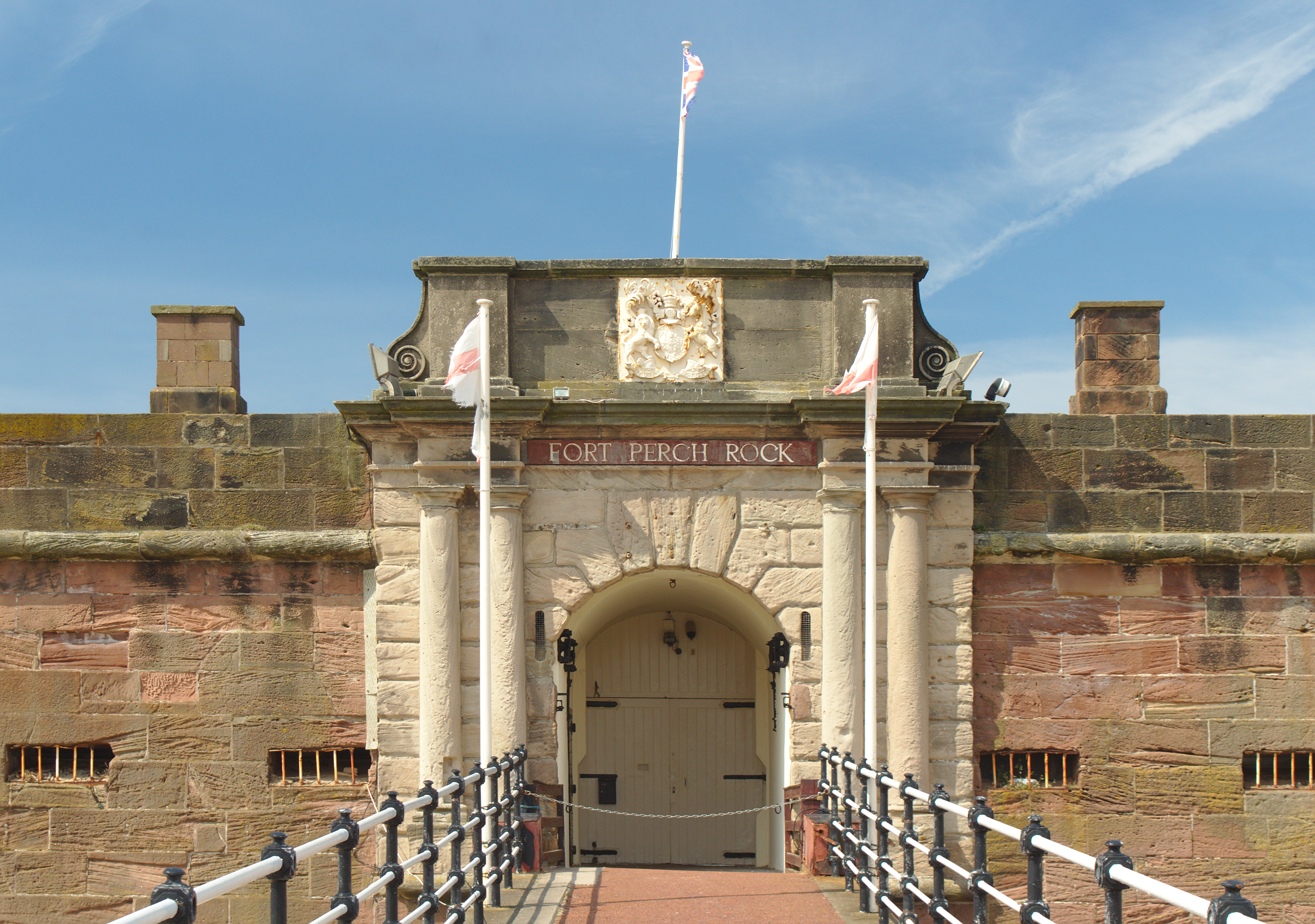
Fort Perch Rock, defending the entrance to the port of Liverpool.

- Headquarters (HQ) at Liverpool
- 1st Brigade
  - HQ at Liverpool
  - 1st Bty at Hong Kong – formerly 9th Bty, 10th Bde
  - 2nd Bty at Jersey – formerly 11th Bty, 10th Bde
  - 3rd Bty at Royal Artillery Barracks, Woolwich – formerly 4th Bty, 7th Bde
  - 4th Bty at Ferozepore – formerly 3rd Bty, 9th Bde
  - 5th Bty at Lahore – formerly 9th Bty, 11th Bde
  - 6th Bty at Gibraltar – formerly 3rd Bty, 10th Bde
  - 7th Bty at Gibraltar – formerly 16th Bty, 10th Bde
  - 8th Bty at Gibraltar – formerly 17th Bty, 10th Bde
  - 9th Bty – new Bty formed 1885
  - 10th Bty – new Bty formed 1887
  - Depot Bty at Liverpool – formerly Depot Bty, 5th Bde
- 2nd Brigade at Liverpool – formerly Royal Lancashire Militia Artillery (6 btys)
- 1st Lancashire Artillery Volunteers at Liverpool
- 2nd Lancashire Artillery Volunteers at Liverpool
- 3rd Lancashire Artillery Volunteers at Blackburn
- 4th Lancashire Artillery Volunteers at Liverpool
- 5th Lancashire Artillery Volunteers at Preston
- 6th Lancashire Artillery Volunteers at Liverpool
- 7th Lancashire (The Manchester Artillery) Artillery Volunteers at Manchester
- 8th Lancashire Artillery Volunteers at Liverpool
- 9th Lancashire Artillery Volunteers at Bolton – new unit formed 1889
- 1st Cheshire and Carnarvonshire Artillery Volunteers at Chester
- 1st Shropshire and Staffordshire Artillery Volunteers at Etruria

== Disbandment ==
In 1889 the garrison artillery was reorganised again into three large divisions of garrison artillery and one of mountain artillery. Although the names of the garrison divisions were still territorial (Eastern, Southern and Western) the assignment of units to them was geographically arbitrary, with the militia and volunteer units formerly in Lancashire Division being grouped in the Southern Division, while the regular batteries were distributed across Southern and Eastern divisions (where there were the most coast defences to be manned in time of war) and completely renumbered.

== See also ==
- Royal Garrison Artillery
- List of Royal Artillery Divisions 1882–1902
- Eastern Division, Royal Artillery
- Southern Division, Royal Artillery
