= Duncan MacDougall (British Army officer) =

British Army officer (1787–1862)

Sir Duncan MacDougall
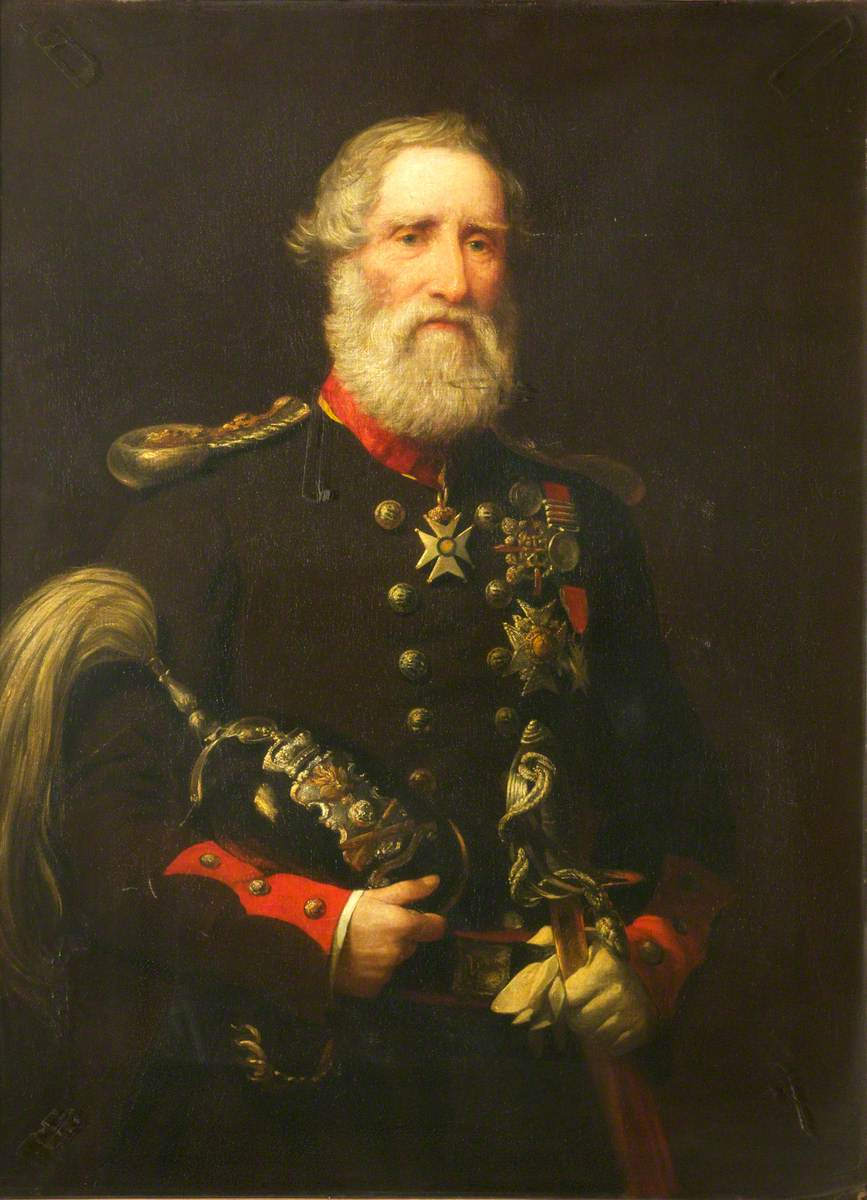
- MacDougall c.1858, by Henry Wyndham Phillips
- Born: 1787; Soroba, Argyll
- Died: 10 December 1862 (aged 74–75); 112 Eaton Square, London
- Burial place: West Norwood Cemetery
- Children: Sir Patrick MacDougall
- Military career
- Allegiance: United Kingdom
- Branch: British Army; British Auxiliary Legion
- Service years: 1804–1838
- Rank: Lieutenant-colonel (British Army); Brigadier-general (British Auxiliary Legion)
- Nickname: Fighting MacDougall
- Commands: 79th Regiment of Foot; Royal Lancashire Militia Artillery
- Conflicts: Napoleonic Wars; Peninsular War; Siege of Badajoz; Siege of the Salamanca forts; Battle of Salamanca (WIA); Siege of Burgos; Siege of San Sebastián; Battle of the Bidassoa; Battle of Nivelle; Battle of the Nive; Battle of Bayonne; War of 1812; Chesapeake Campaign; Battle of Bladensburg; Burning of Washington; Battle of Baltimore; Gulf Campaign; Battle of New Orleans; Battle of Fort Bowyer; First Carlist War; Battle of Lugariz
- Awards: Knight bachelor Military General Service Medal; Royal and Military Order of Saint Ferdinand (Spain)

Lieutenant-Colonel Sir Duncan MacDougall (1787 – 10 December 1862) was a British Army officer who fought in the Peninsular War and War of 1812. He rose to command the 79th Regiment of Foot before serving as second-in-command of the British Auxiliary Legion during the First Carlist War.

MacDougall joined the British Army in 1804. After initial service at the Cape of Good Hope he fought through much of the Peninsular War in Spain and Portugal as a subaltern, being seriously wounded at the Battle of Salamanca. He became aide de camp to Major-General Robert Ross during the War of 1812, and was by his side at the Battle of Baltimore when the general was killed. Promoted to major, MacDougall became aide de camp to Major-General Sir Edward Pakenham. He was riding alongside Pakenham when the latter was mortally wounded at the Battle of New Orleans.

MacDougall was promoted to lieutenant-colonel in 1825. Sent to command colonial militia in Nova Scotia, he transferred to the 79th Regiment of Foot in 1830 and commanded it from 1832. In 1835 he joined the British Auxiliary Legion as second-in-command. He resigned a year later amidst disagreements over strategy with the commander of the Legion, De Lacy Evans. MacDougall left the British Army in 1838 and in retirement was a champion of militia and volunteer movements, establishing the Royal Lancashire Militia Artillery in 1853 and assisting with the formation of the Volunteer Force in 1859.

== Early life ==
Duncan MacDougall was born in 1787 at Soroba near Oban, Argyllshire; he was the son of Patrick MacDougall and Mary née M'Vicar. As a child he was educated in Edinburgh.

== Military career ==
=== Early service ===
MacDougall joined the British Army in 1804, during the Napoleonic Wars, becoming an ensign in the 71st Regiment of Foot on 6 April. He was promoted to lieutenant on 23 April 1805, and subsequently transferred to the Cape Regiment which was stationed in the Cape Colony. There he was promoted to captain on 19 June 1806. For a while he was in command of the frontier there. After around six years of service at the Cape he transferred to the 53rd Regiment of Foot on 6 February 1812.

=== Peninsular War ===
MacDougall joined his regiment in the Iberian Peninsula, fighting the Peninsular War. He first saw action at the Siege of Badajoz and on 6 April was part of the force that stormed and captured the city. MacDougall then saw service at the Siege of the Salamanca forts, which were captured on 27 June.

MacDougall and his regiment subsequently fought at the Battle of Salamanca on 22 July, during which he was seriously wounded while saving the regimental colours. He then saw service at the Siege of Burgos between September and October, after the failure of which the army retreated to Ciudad Rodrigo. MacDougall transferred to the 85th Regiment of Foot on 25 January the following year, then participating in the Siege of San Sebastián from July until its capture on 31 August. In the advance afterwards he served at the Battle of the Bidassoa on 7 October, Battle of Nivelle on 10 November, and Battle of the Nive in early December. After this MacDougall formed part of the force that besieged Bayonne into 1814, repulsing a French counterattack on 14 April. He received the Military General Service Medal for his participation at Salamanca, San Sebastián, Nivelle, and the Nive.

=== War of 1812 ===
As the Napoleonic Wars came to an end in France, MacDougall was transferred to fight in the War of 1812 in North America. Initially in the Chesapeake Campaign, he was appointed to serve as an aide de camp (ADC) to Major-General Robert Ross, replacing another sick ADC. MacDougall fought at the Battle of Bladensburg on 24 August and was with the force that advanced afterwards to capture Washington.

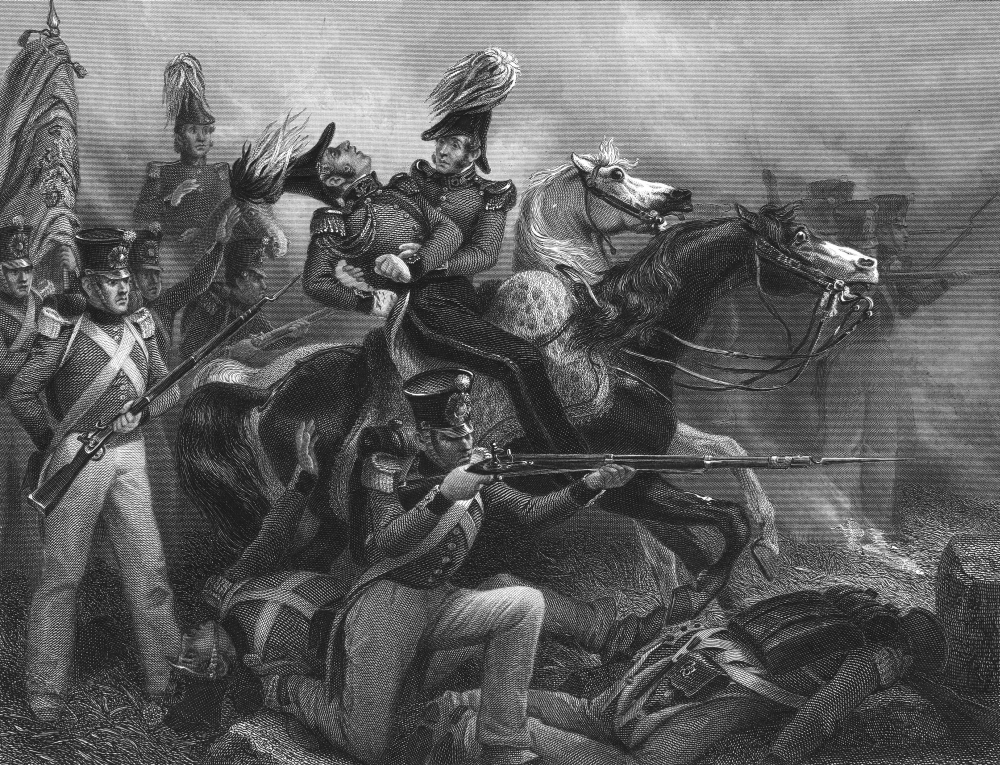
Robert Ross is caught as he is shot from his horse at the Battle of Baltimore

MacDougall was then present at the unsuccessful Battle of Baltimore on 12 September. He was riding with Ross, the latter returning from reconnoitring the frontline, when an American soldier hiding behind a tree shot and mortally wounded the general. He fell from his horse, being caught by MacDougall and Captain Edward Crofton of the Royal Navy, and died three hours later. MacDougall was promoted to brevet major on 20 October.

After the failure of Ross' campaign MacDougall continued on in North America, this time in the Gulf Campaign as ADC to Major-General Sir Edward Pakenham. At the Battle of New Orleans on 8 January 1815 MacDougall lost his second general. As British troops began to flee from the assault on the American defences, Pakenham rode forward to stop the retreat, with MacDougall by his side. Pakenham succeeded in rallying the soldiers for another assault, but was then shot in the knee and had his horse killed. MacDougall stood Pakenham up and mounted him on his pony, leading Pakenham forwards while he shouted at his soldiers. The general was then shot through the spine and mortally wounded, dying as he was carried away from the fighting.

After the battle MacDougall, known as "fighting MacDougall", was one of the few officers wanting to continue on the offensive at New Orleans. The new commander, Major-General Sir John Lambert, chose to withdraw. The army instead travelled to Mobile Bay where it fought the Battle of Fort Bowyer, capturing the fort on 12 February. On the following day they were informed that the war had ended. MacDougall subsequently provided evidence as a witness to the court-martial of Lieutenant-Colonel Thomas Mullins, who had forgotten to take ladders with his regiment for the assault at New Orleans and was cashiered.

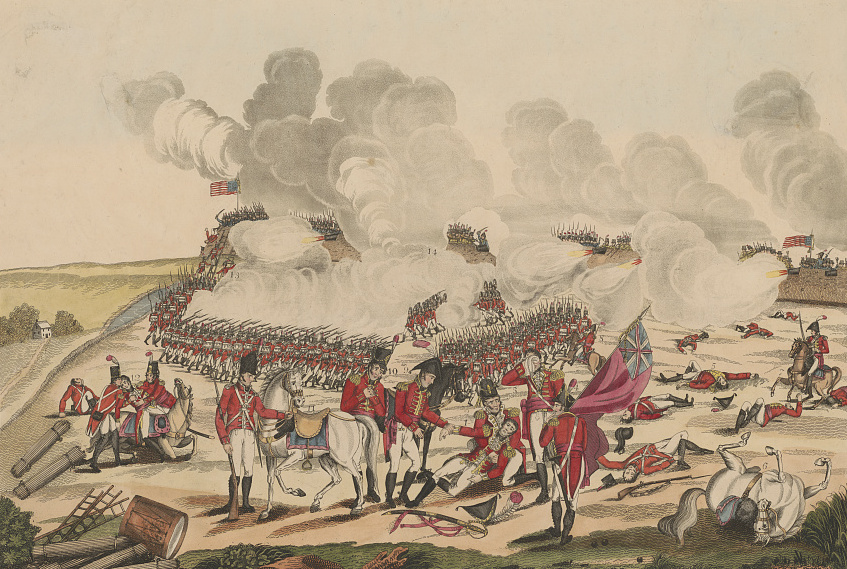
Sir Edward Pakenham (centre) dies at the Battle of New Orleans; MacDougall is the officer cradling him

=== Post war ===
MacDougall continued on in the British Army after the end of the wars, going on half pay on 28 August 1817. In 1824 he went to Paris with another North American veteran, Captain Harry Smith, where they obtained recompense from a Frenchman who had maligned one of MacDougall's family friends and reminisced about Smith's time there at the occupation in 1815.

MacDougall was promoted to brevet lieutenant-colonel on 25 April 1825 and given the responsibility of organizing the colonial militia in Nova Scotia. He reverted to his substantive rank as a major when he transferred to the 79th Regiment of Foot on 16 July 1830. With the 79th in Canada, he assumed command of the regiment in 1832 and provided military aid to the authorities in Montreal by putting down civil disturbances. MacDougall was promoted to lieutenant-colonel on 6 September the following year.

=== British Auxiliary Legion ===
MacDougall resigned his command of the 79th on 13 March 1835 so that he could instead join the British Auxiliary Legion, that was forming to serve in Spain as a voluntary formation, under Spanish command and pay. Commanded by De Lacy Evans, who had served with MacDougall at New Orleans, the force would fight in the First Carlist War in support of Isabella II. MacDougall joined Evans as his second in command and quartermaster general. Ranked as a brigadier-general, he also served as colonel of the 9th Regiment of the Legion. In Spain the Legion struggled, with a reputation as a poorly led and undisciplined unit which was exacerbated by a lack of pay. In March 1836 MacDougall was sent to Madrid by Evans to request payment and supplies but was unsuccessful.

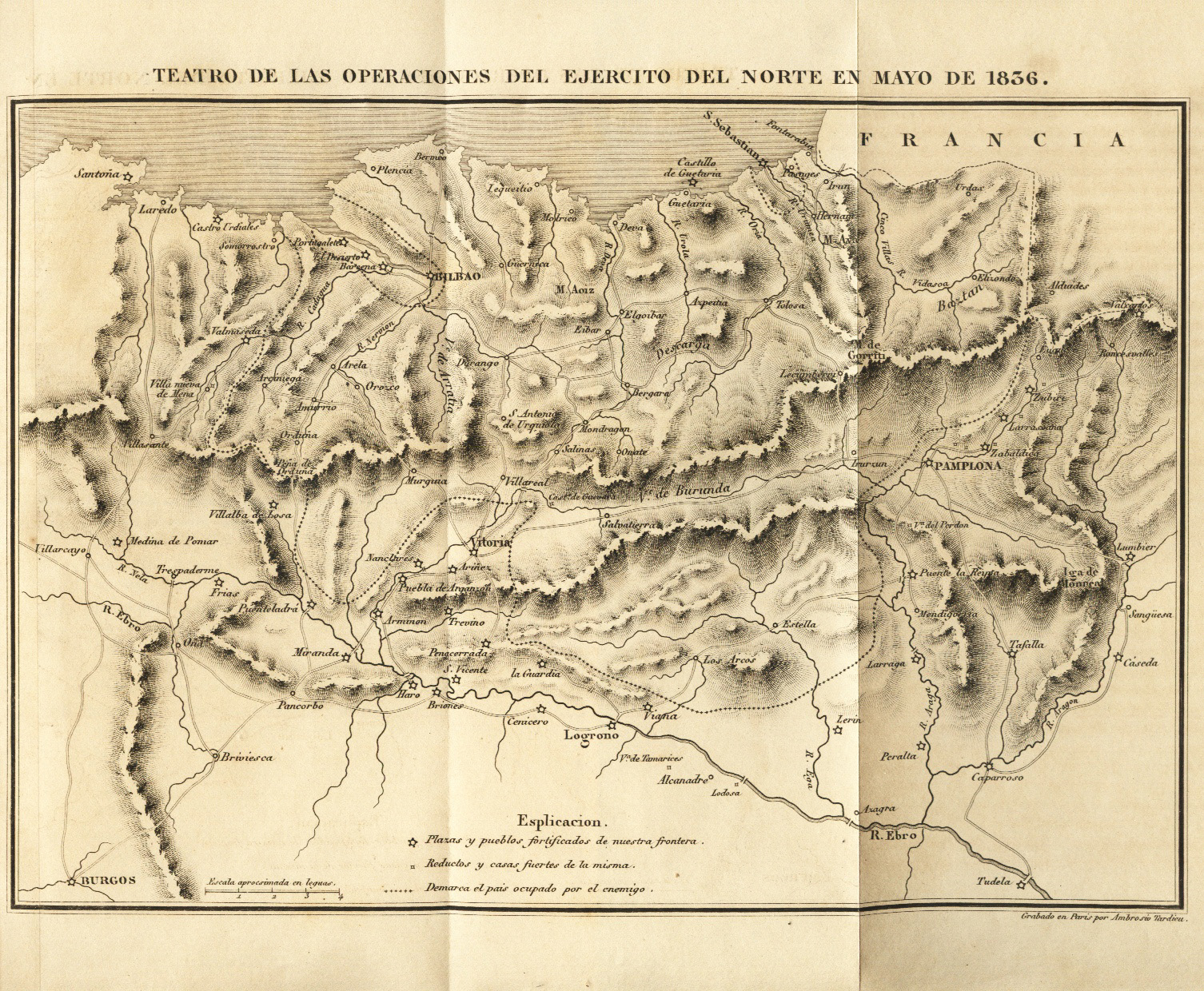
Map of operations in northern Spain in May 1836 showing San Sebastián and Hernani towards the top right

The Legion was sent to Santander in May for offensive operations. The city of San Sebastián was being besieged by 4,000 Carlists and Evans decided to relieve the siege on 5 May. The Legion had only 6,000 men, Evans having decided not to wait for the final 4,000 to arrive by ship. In an early morning frontal assault the Carlist besieging force was pushed away, costing the Legion 131 men killed and 709 wounded. While the action, the Battle of Lugariz, was victorious, officers criticised Evans for not waiting for his reinforcements and for persevering with costly frontal assaults. Colonel Richard de la Saussaye, an Irish officer in the Spanish Army, believed that Evans had not wanted to take such a direct approach and had only done so under the advice of MacDougall, who de la Saussaye described as "an old Armadillo [who] likes knocking his head against a wall".

By June discontent in the Legion was mounting again; pay was in short supply and the officers were frustrated with an order from Evans that made the Royal Marines they were fighting alongside outrank them. Evans became paranoid that some more ambitious officers would leave Spain to disparage him back in Britain. MacDougall remained loyal to Evans, praising the Legion to Lord Palmerston, the Foreign Secretary. Despite this Evans reported MacDougall to Palmerston as one of those he believed would be self-centred enough to return malevolently, greatly surprising Palmerston.

After Lugariz Evans chose to remain outside of San Sebastián, believing that to advance further would be to allow Carlist forces the opportunity to attack him from the flanks. MacDougall was one of a group of officers who campaigned for Evans to move on and attack Hernani, a previous war goal, but Evans stayed put. With a force not large enough to protect the whole of San Sebastián, he was unable to stop the Carlists from re-starting the siege. In frustration MacDougall resigned from the Legion, departing sometime before August.

MacDougall was appointed to the Royal and Military Order of Saint Ferdinand by Isabella and also received the British Legion Medal for his service in Spain. Having returned to Britain, he was knighted at St James's Palace on 18 July 1838. He retired fully from the British Army in the same year.

=== Militia service ===
MacDougall was a supporter of part-time and militia units in the British Army. He formed the Royal Lancashire Militia Artillery on 13 April 1853, serving as lieutenant-colonel of the regiment. He volunteered the regiment for service in the Crimean War in December the following year, believing that his artillery could replace the Royal Artillery garrisons at Gibraltar and Malta. His request was declined and a suggestion made that any of his artillerymen who wanted to serve could instead transfer into the Royal Artillery. The regiment was embodied as part of the regular army on 25 January 1855, in response to the war and a resulting offer of service from MacDougall. Initially serving at Liverpool, it saw service in the south of England around Dover and Portsmouth and also travelled to Cork and Kinsale in Ireland.

During this period a royal commission was started to investigate the practice of purchasing commissions in the British Army. MacDougall's old comrade Evans was an opponent of the practice, and in May 1856 he brought forward MacDougall as a sympathetic witness. He gave testimony describing the negative impact on officers who were passed over for promotion in favour of those who could purchase the rank. The commission decided not to abolish the purchase system, but published a detailed report including the criticisms of it. MacDougall's opinion was widely quoted in newspapers such as The Standard and The Times. He resigned his commission in the militia and departed from the Royal Lancashire Militia Artillery on 27 April 1857.

=== Volunteer movement ===
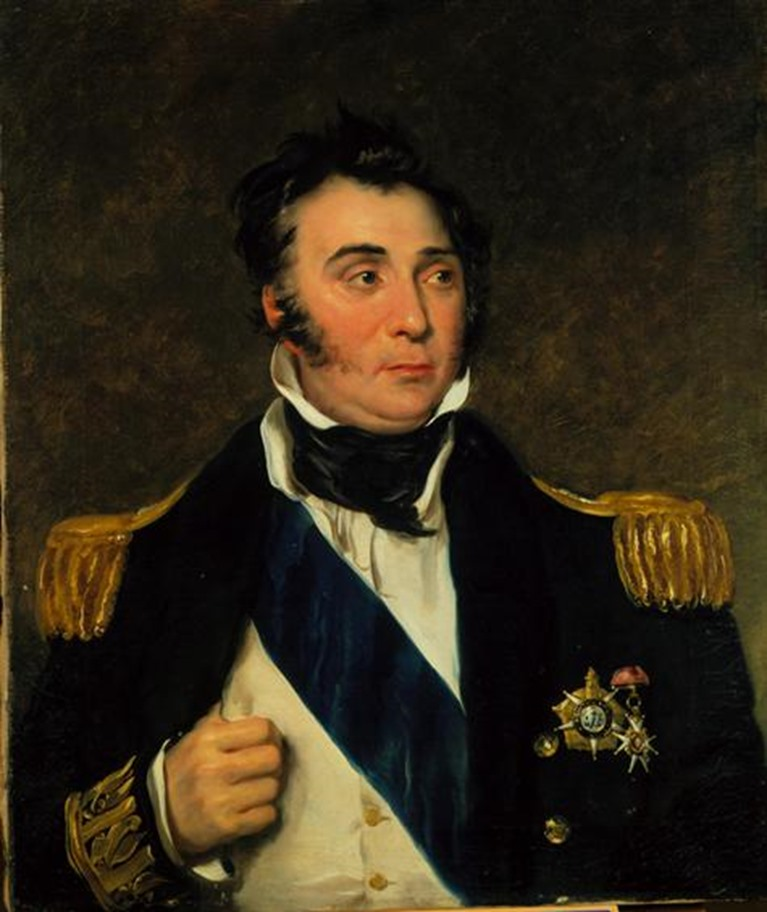
Sir Charles Napier was a fellow supporter of the Volunteer Force

In retirement MacDougall became one of the main supporters behind the Volunteer Force, a popular movement to create volunteer units for the army in response to a feared invasion from France. He had been in favour of such volunteers since his service with the militia in Canada in 1825. MacDougall convened the meeting that began the movement, alongside Admiral Sir Charles Napier and Alfred Bate Richards, at St Martin's Hall in London on 16 April 1859. In response to the pressure from the meeting and an outcry from the press, the War Office announced the official formation of the new corps on 12 May. MacDougall went on to publish several works in relation to the Volunteer Force, including Hints to Volunteers on Various Subjects in 1860 and The History of the Volunteer Movement in 1861, the latter of which described the claims of various individuals to be the creator of the Volunteer movement.

== Personal life and death ==
MacDougall married Anne Smelt, the daughter of Cornelius Smelt, in 1817. They had a son, Patrick Leonard MacDougall, who followed his father into the British Army, was knighted and became a general. MacDougall married for a second time in 1844, this time to a widow, Hannah Nicholson, of Springfield House, Liverpool.

MacDougall died at his home address, 112 Eaton Square, London, on 10 December 1862. He was buried in West Norwood Cemetery, where there is a family vault. A memorial by George Gammon Adams was erected to him in St Paul's Cathedral. It is located in the crypt vestibule of St Faith under St Paul's.
