= Royal Lancashire Militia Artillery =

Former English reserve unit

Royal Lancashire Artillery Militia 2nd Brigade, Northern Division, RA Lancashire RGA (M) Lancashire RFA (M)
- Active: 13 April 1853–1909
- Country: United Kingdom
- Branch: Militia
- Role: Garrison Artillery; Field Artillery
- Size: 6 Batteries (RGA); 3 Batteries (RFA)
- Part of: Lancashire Division, RA (1882–89); Southern Division, RA (1889–1902)
- Garrison/HQ: Liverpool (1854–89); Seaforth (1889–1909); Fulwood Barracks (RFA 1901–9)

The Royal Lancashire Militia Artillery was a part-time reserve unit of Britain's Royal Artillery based in Lancashire from 1853 to 1909.

== Background ==
The long-standing national Militia of the United Kingdom was revived by the Militia Act 1852, enacted during a period of international tension. As before, units were raised and administered on a county basis, and filled by voluntary enlistment (although conscription by means of the Militia Ballot might be used if the counties failed to meet their quotas). Training was for 56 days on enlistment, then for 21–28 days per year, during which the men received full army pay. Under the Act, Militia units could be embodied by Royal Proclamation for full-time service in three circumstances:

1. 'Whenever a state of war exists between Her Majesty and any foreign power'.
2. 'In all cases of invasion or upon imminent danger thereof'.
3. 'In all cases of rebellion or insurrection'.

The 1852 Act introduced Militia Artillery units in addition to the traditional infantry regiments. Their role was to man coastal defences and fortifications, relieving the Royal Artillery (RA) for active service.

== History ==
Under the 1852 reorganisation Lancashire was one of the counties selected to have a corps of militia artillery, and on 10 March 1853 the Lord Lieutenant (the Earl of Sefton) was requested to raise it from scratch, rather than by conversion of an existing infantry regiment. It came into existence on 13 April 1853 under the command of Lieutenant-Colonel Sir Duncan MacDougall, formerly of the 79th Highlanders and the British Auxiliary Legion, as the Royal Lancashire Militia Artillery. By the time of the unit's first training period in October 1853, 15 officers had been commissioned and 510 men enrolled in six batteries, with headquarters at Liverpool. Several of the officers had previous service with Regular artillery or infantry regiments, including the senior Major, Thomas Atchison, formerly of the RA.

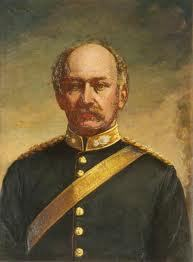
Lt-Col James Clifton Brown, MP.

In 1857, MacDougall became an advocate of the Rifle Volunteer Movement and offered the use of the Royal Lancashire Artillery Militia's barracks to members of the 'Liverpool Drill Club' and leading Liverpool politicians, who were trying to raise a Rifle Volunteer Corps in the city. One officer of the RLAM, James Clifton Brown, was from 1864 simultaneously Lt-Col of the 1st Lancashire Artillery Volunteers.

Following the Cardwell Reforms a mobilisation scheme began to appear in the Army List from December 1875. This assigned places in an order of battle of the 'Garrison Army' to Militia Artillery units: the Lancashire Artillery's war station was in the Plymouth defences.

The garrison artillery in the UK was reorganised into 11 divisions in 1882, and the unit became the only Militia unit in the new Lancashire Division, taking the title of 2nd Brigade, Lancashire Division, RA (the 1st Brigade comprised the Regular RA units of the division). When the Lancashire Division was abolished in 1889 its militia were transferred to the Southern Division, and the unit's title was altered to Lancashire Artillery (Southern Division) RA. The unit's HQ transferred from central Liverpool to Seaforth in August 1889.

From 1899 the Militia artillery formally became part of the Royal Garrison Artillery (RGA), and when the RGA abolished the divisional structure the unit at Seaforth took the title of Lancashire RGA (M) on 1 January 1902.

== Embodiments ==
The unit was embodied three times for home defence:

- Crimean War: 25 January 1855 to 30 May 1856. MacDougall offered the corps for embodiment within a year of its raising, but it was not called upon for another six months. During 1855 MacDougall and 100 men volunteered for active service, though the offer was declined. Nevertheless, well over 100 men volunteered to transfer to the Regular RA. During this first period of embodiment, members of the corps were instrumental in controlling a serious fire at Huskisson Dock in Liverpool and were handsomely rewarded by the Dock Committee.
- Indian Mutiny: 4 October 1857 to 15 June 1860. The unit was embodied at Liverpool and again, the commanding officer, Lt-Col Atchison, and 70 men volunteered for active service but the offer was declined. By May 1859 the unit was in garrison at Dover and then at Shorncliffe in July, before crossing to Kinsale in Ireland in September, moving to Cork in October, back to Kinsale in November, and finally to Charles Fort outside Kinsale in December. It remained there until June 1860, when it returned to Liverpool to be disembodied.
- Second Boer War: 3 May to 10 October 1900. Although several artillery militia units sent service companies of volunteers to South Africa, the Lancashire was not among them.

== Lancashire Royal Field Artillery ==
After the Boer War, the future of the Militia was called into question. There were moves to reform the Auxiliary Forces (Militia, Yeomanry and Volunteers) to take their place in the six Army Corps proposed by St John Brodrick as Secretary of State for War. Some batteries of Militia Artillery were to be converted to Royal Field Artillery (RFA).

As an experiment, a completely new three-battery militia field artillery brigade, the Lancashire Royal Field Artillery (Militia), was raised at Fulwood Barracks, Preston, on 6 May 1901 under the command of Lt-Col Algernon Sidney (later 4th Baron De L'Isle and Dudley). Sidney was a regular officer of the RFA and the unit had a larger cadre of regular instructors, gunners and drivers than normal for a militia unit, amounting to 25 per cent of its total strength. The unit trained for two months each year on Salisbury Plain, and that degree of commitment made it difficult to obtain part-time junior officers.

However, little of Brodrick's scheme was carried out, and the Lancashire RFA (M) remained the only Militia RFA unit.

== Disbandment ==
Under the sweeping Haldane Reforms of 1908, the Militia was replaced by the Special Reserve, a semi-professional force whose role was to provide reinforcement drafts for Regular units serving overseas in wartime. Although the majority of the officers and men of the Lancashire RFA (M) and Lancashire RGA (M) accepted transfer to the Special Reserve RFA, to become the 1st and 2nd Lancashire Royal Field Reserve Artillery, these and virtually all other Militia Artillery units were disbanded in March 1909. Instead, the men of the RFA Special Reserve would form Brigade Ammunition Columns for the Regular RFA brigades on the outbreak of war.

== Honorary Colonels ==
The following served as Honorary Colonel of the unit:

- Lt-Col Thomas Atchison, former Commandant, appointed 13 April 1862
- James Clifton Brown, former Lt-Col, appointed 14 July 1888
- William H. Walker, appointed 15 February 1899
