= Crosby Battery =

- Crosby, Merseyside; England

Site information
- Condition: Partially demolished

Location
- Coordinates: 53.5098°N 3.06187°W

Site history
- Built: 1906-7
- Materials: Concrete

Crosby Battery, also known as Crosby Point Battery and Fort Crosby, was an artillery battery situated between Crosby and Hightown in Lancashire, United Kingdom. The battery was used for port defence and anti-aircraft defence during WWII. Until 1928 Crosby Battery worked in conjunction with the nearby Seaforth Battery.

== History ==
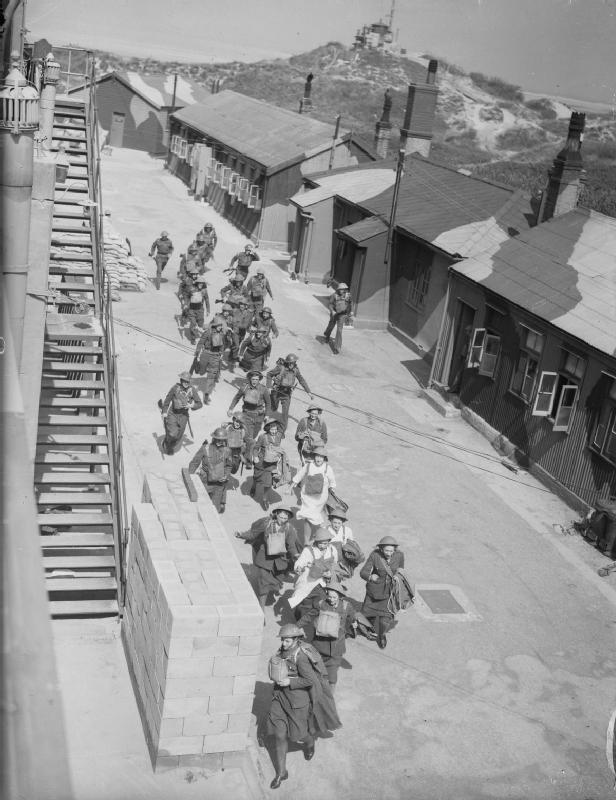
ATS girls and gun crews of 177 Heavy Battery Royal Artillery rush to 'take post' at Fort Crosby near Liverpool, England. This training operation formed part of British preparations to repel the threatened German invasion of 1940 (IWM H2696)

Crosby Battery was built on the sand dunes north of Crosby between March 1906 and October 1907. The structure came with three gun emplacements, which were 40 yards (37 m) apart, with ammunition kept underneath the positions. The original complement of guns were two 6 inches (150 mm) breech-loading Mark VII guns, which were the same as those installed at nearby Fort Perch Rock, on the opposite side of the mouth of the River Mersey. Behind the positions were two barracks and soldiers' quarters. Around the battery was an observation post, a signal station, an officers' hut, caretaker's accommodation, a bath house, a workshop. An engine room, with coastal spotlights, was built later. The battery was given the designation S0011771.

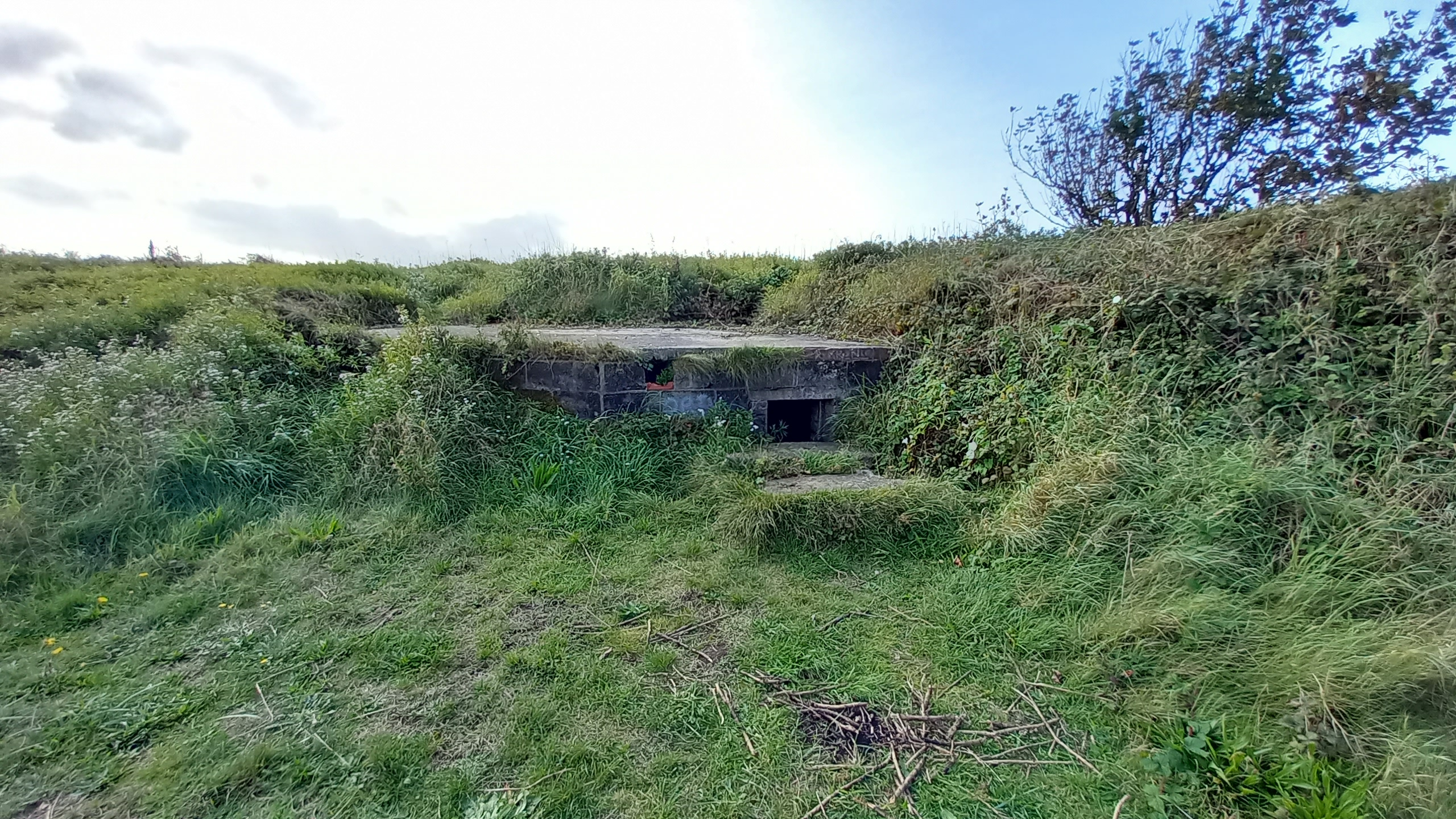
Crosby Battery Outside

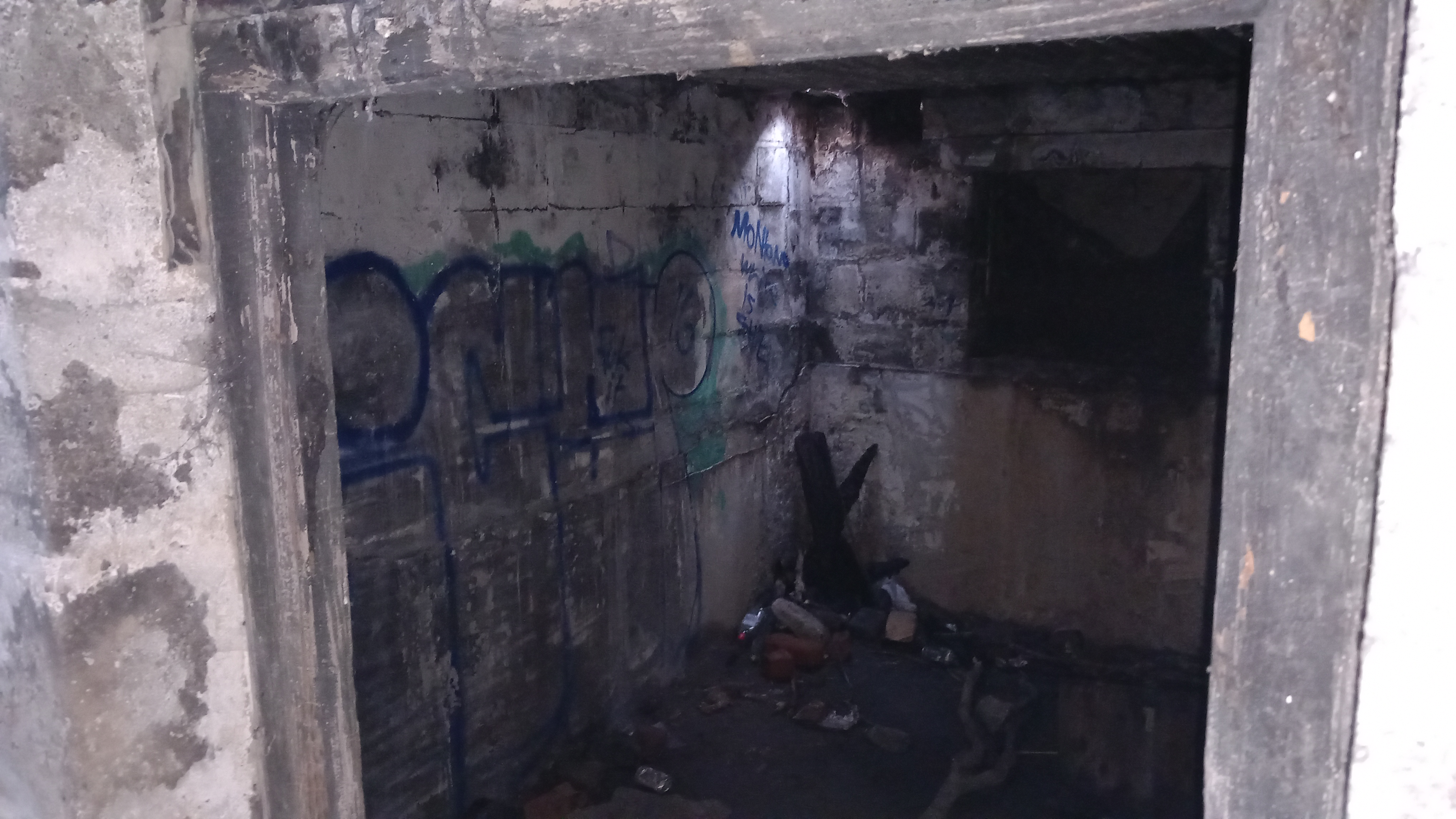
Crosby Battery Inside

The battery was the headquarters for the Lancashire and Cheshire Heavy Brigade, Royal Artillery (TF). On the outbreak of the First World War Fort Crosby, Seaforth Battery and Fort Perch Rock were responsible for the defence of the River Mersey. By the Second World War the defences of the Mersey comprised two 6-inch guns at Crosby Battery and two 6-inch guns at Fort Perch Rock. Fort Crosby received a naval 4-inch Breech loading (BL) gun, which was mounted on the right flank of the battery.

After the Second World War, the Territorial Army used the area, until 1954. The base was subsequently closed in 1957 on the dissolution of coast artillery in the United Kingdom announced in 1956.

After permission was given for a housing development at Hightown, the Ministry of Defence sold the battery, in 1963, including 417 acres (169 hectares) of foreshore. Many of the buildings were demolished, following this, in 1967. However, the site of the battery still exists, adjacent to the West Lancashire Golf Course. As of 2020, the site still consists of the stone gun emplacements, but the area where the barracks and operational buildings has now been cleared. This area is noticeable from the surrounding areas however, as a flat clearing amongst the dunes. As of 2020, no plaques, plinths or signage exist to commemorate the Fort.

== Bibliography ==
- McCarron, Ken (1991). Fort Perch Rock and the Defence of the Mersey. Countryvise Ltd. ISBN 978-0951612910. Merseyside Portfolios.
