= Fort Perch Rock =

1820s military fort in Merseyside, England

- New Brighton, Merseyside, England
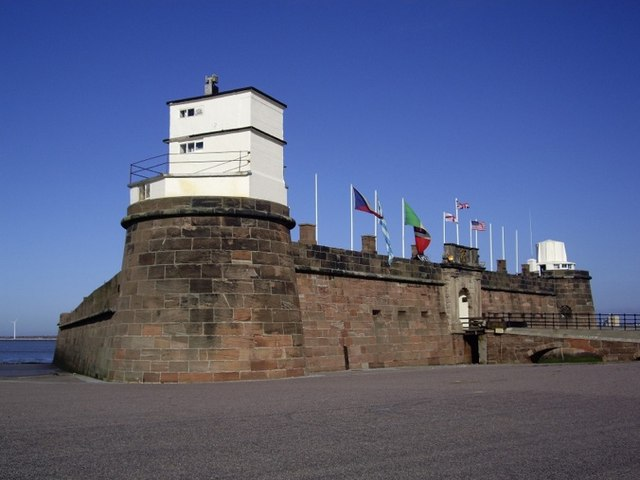

Site information
- Type: Coastal fort
- Owner: Museum
- Controlled by: United Kingdom
- Condition: Good

Location
- Location of Fort Perch Rock in Merseyside
- Coordinates: 53.4427°N 3.0412°W

Site history
- Built: 1825–29
- Materials: Sandstone

Listed Building – Grade II*
- Official name: Fort Perch Rock
- Designated: 4 January 1977
- Reference no.: 1258164

Fort Perch Rock is a former defence installation situated at the mouth of Liverpool Bay in New Brighton, Merseyside, England. Built in the 1820s to defend the Port of Liverpool, it is now a tourist attraction and museum. It has been used as a venue for musical concerts and is a Grade II* listed building. The fort's cafe "The Mess" is open daily from 9 a.m. A World War 2 escape room concept "Escape the Fort" runs within the fort.

== History ==
Fort Perch Rock is a coastal defence battery built between 1825 and 1829, with the foundation stone being laid in 1826. It was built to protect the Port of Liverpool and proposed as a fortified lighthouse to replace the old Perch Rock Light; however, a separate lighthouse was built. The fort was built on an area known as Black Rock, and was cut off at high tide. However, coastal reclamation has made it fully accessible.

The fort covers an area of about 4,000 square yards (3,300 m^{2}), with enough space for 100 men. It was built with red sandstone from the Runcorn quarries. The height of the walls ranges from 24 feet (7.3 m) to 32 feet (9.8 m), and the towers are 40 feet (12 m) tall. The fort originally had a drawbridge, and a Tuscan portal which bore the coat of arms and the words 'Fort Perch Rock'. At one point it was armed with 18 guns, of which 16 were 32-pounders, mounted on platforms. It was nicknamed the 'Little Gibraltar of the Mersey'.

The foundation stone reads:

This foundation stone of the Rock Perch Battery, projected by and under the direction of John Sikes Kitson, Esquire, Captain in the Royal Engineers, for the defence of the port was laid on 31st March 1826 by Peter Bourne, Esquire, Mayor of Liverpool in the 7th year of the reign of His Majesty George IV. His Grace, the Duke of Wellington, Master General of the Ordnance.

The projected cost of building was £27,065.0s.8d. Kitson ensured that this budget was not exceeded, finishing the fort for a total cost of £26,965.0s.8d.

== Modern use ==
In the late 1970s, the fort could be hired as a party venue. During this time Orchestral Manoeuvres in the Dark founder members Andy McCluskey and Paul Humphreys played there as members of the short lived Wirral group The Id. Since the 1990s, the fort has played host to various musical events including, in the summer of 2006, a number of rock concerts which were organised by a group of young Wallaseyans. The nights were called "Nautical" and were featured in The Guardian newspaper and named The NME club of the week for the 1 September 2006 show, which featured British Sea Power and the Tiny Dancers.

The fort features a museum (no longer open to casual visitors) with displays including military aviation, maritime history. Previously, the Fort Perch Rock Marine Radio Museum used to exhibit marine wireless communications devices. The "Escape The Fort" escape room opened in 2022 and is available for bookings daily. In spring 2022, The Mess cafe opened within the fort and is open daily from 9 a.m.

The World War Two drama The Black Rock was filmed at Fort Perch Rock in 2024. The film stars Kyle Brookes and Charles Riley, and is directed by Andrew Games.

== In literature and the arts ==
In the poetical illustration The Black-Rock Fort and Lighthouse, by Letitia Elizabeth Landon to an engraving of a painting by Samuel Austin, she imagines the beacon light as a welcoming sight to voyagers returning home to England.

== Gallery ==
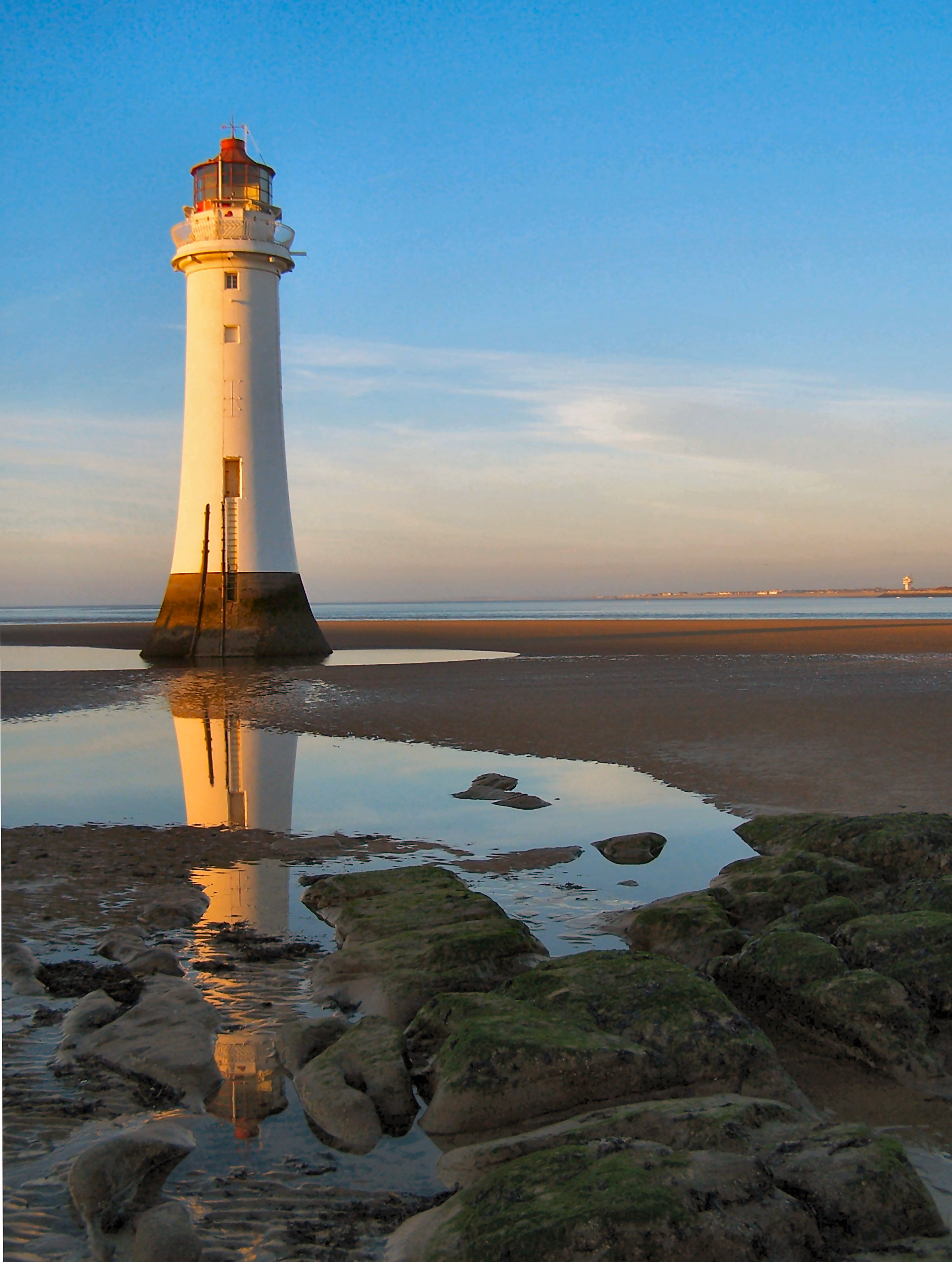
Perch Rock Lighthouse

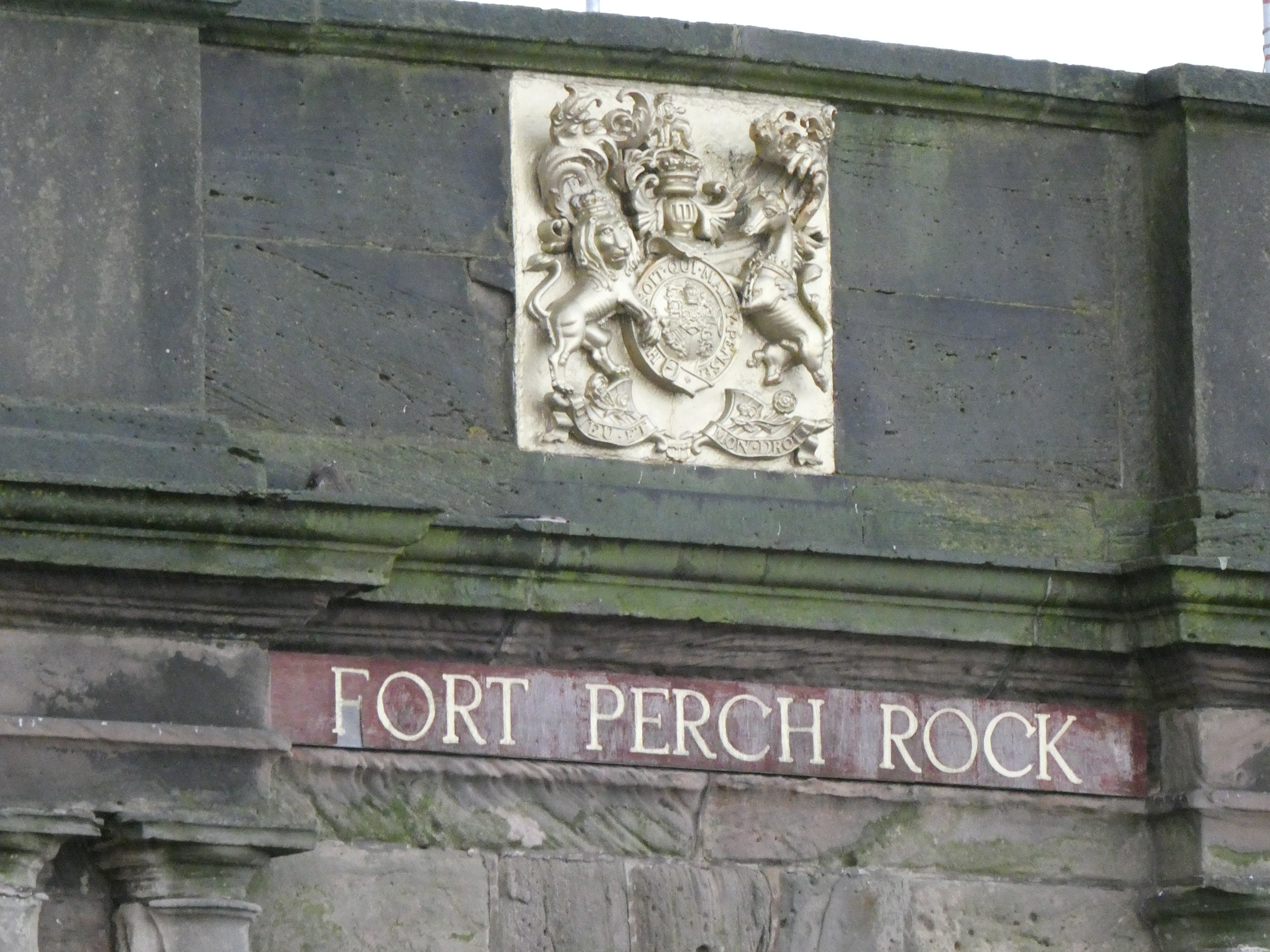
Crest above the entrance

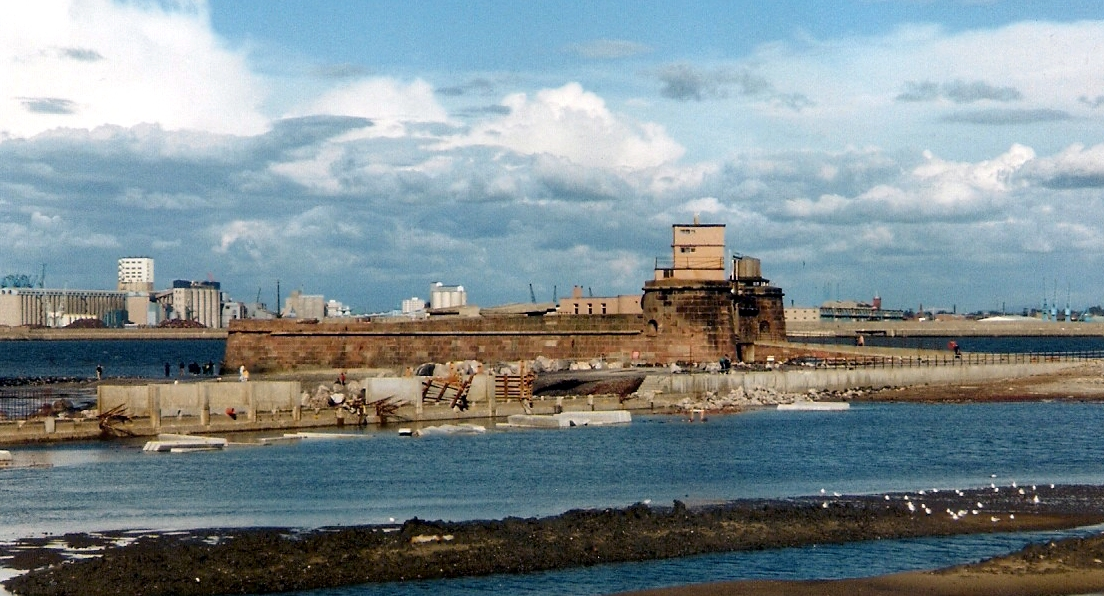
Fort Perch Rock with Liverpool in the distance

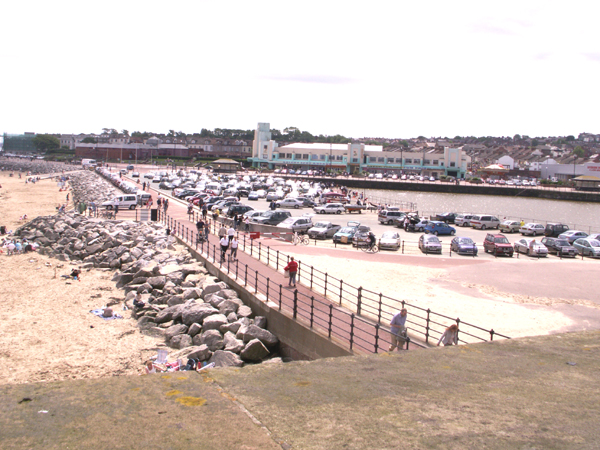
View from the top of Fort Perch Rock

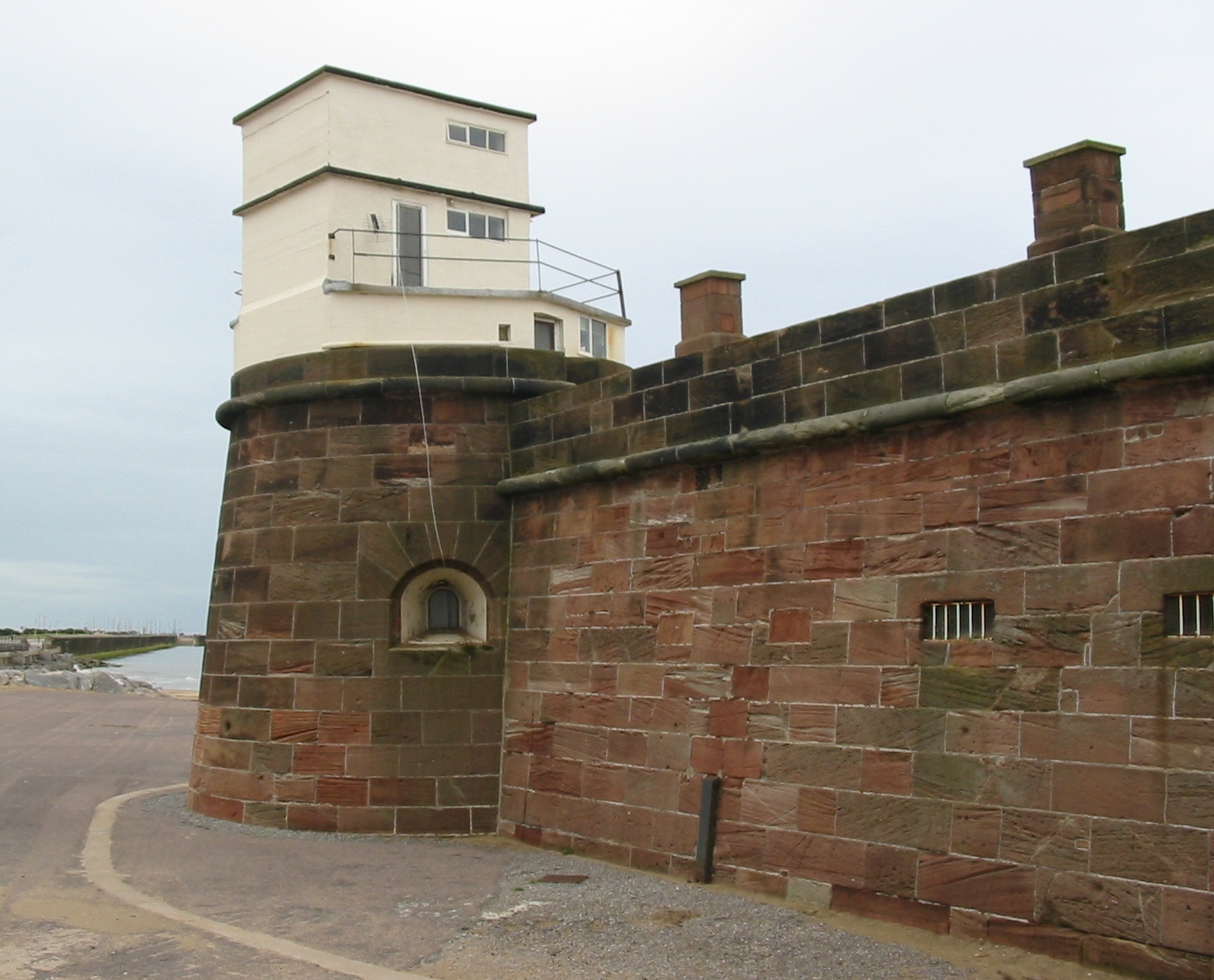
Fort Perch Rock

== See also ==
- Fort Crosby
- Grade II* listed buildings in Merseyside
- Listed buildings in New Brighton, Merseyside
- Seaforth Battery

== Bibliography ==
- McCarron, Ken (1991). Fort Perch Rock and the Defence of the Mersey. Countryvise Ltd. ISBN 978-0951612910. Merseyside Portfolios.
- Cocks, C. J. (1977). Notes on Fort Perch Rock, New Brighton, Merseyside, and of its garrison from 1826 to 1956. Wallasey: Self published. OCLC 7249440.
