= Seaforth Battery =

Artillery battery in Seaforth, Sefton, England

- Seaforth, Merseyside; England

Location
- Coordinates: 53.452°N 3.020°W

Site history
- Built: 1875–79
- Materials: Iron; Granite
- Demolished: 1929

Seaforth Battery, Seaforth, Merseyside, England was built to protect shipping on the River Mersey. Constructed as part of the defences of the Mersey Docks, the battery was designed to engage ships using the Rock Channel head on as well as the other shipping channels. The battery supported Fort Perch Rock, which was located opposite on the Wirral bank of the river. It was completed at the end of 1879 at a cost of £19,109.

The main armament comprised four 12.5-inch RML guns which were mounted in armoured granite casemates. These were installed soon after completion of the battery. These were soon augmented in 1894 with two 4.7-inch Quick Fire guns which were originally sent to arm Fort Perch Rock. These were suitable for engaging fast torpedo boats. In 1898 a fire control centre for the 4.7-inch guns was added at the east end of the battery.

In 1903, the four 12.5-inch RMLs were removed as they were obsolete. In 1907, two of the 12.5-inch RML gun casemates were opened out to mount searchlights.

In 1928, a review of the defences of the Mersey was undertaken and it was decided that Seaforth battery was no longer required. The battery was dismantled and the land returned to the harbour board in 1929.

== Bibliography ==
- McCarron, Ken (1991). Fort Perch Rock and the Defence of the Mersey. Countryvise Ltd. ISBN 978-0951612910. Merseyside Portfolios.

== External sources ==
- Victorian Forts data sheet on Seaforth Battery
- "Seaforth Barracks Recruiting Office 1917". litherland-digital.co.uk.
- "Townships – Bootle". British History Online.
