= Scottish Division, Royal Artillery =

Scottish Division, RA
- Cap Badge of the Royal Regiment of Artillery
- Active: 4 April 1882–1 July 1889
- Country: United Kingdom
- Branch: British Army
- Type: Administrative division
- Part of: Royal Artillery
- Garrison/HQ: Leith

The Scottish Division, Royal Artillery, was an administrative grouping of garrison units of the Royal Artillery, Artillery Militia and Artillery Volunteers within the British Army's Scottish District from 1882 to 1889.

== Organisation ==
Under General Order 72 of 4 April 1882 the Royal Artillery (RA) broke up its existing administrative brigades (Note: In RA terminology, a 'brigade' was a group of independent batteries grouped together for administrative rather than tactical purposes, the officer in command being usually a lieutenant-colonel rather than a brigadier-general or major-general, the ranks usually associated with command of an infantry or cavalry brigade.) of garrison artillery (7th–11th Brigades, RA) and assigned the individual batteries to 11 new territorial divisions. These divisions were purely administrative and recruiting organisations, not field formations. Most were formed within the existing military districts into which the United Kingdom was divided, and for the first time associated the part-time Artillery Militia with the regulars. Shortly afterwards the Artillery Volunteers were also added to the territorial divisions. The Regular Army batteries were grouped into one brigade, usually of nine sequentially-numbered batteries and a depot battery. For these units the divisions represented recruiting districts – batteries could be serving anywhere in the British Empire and their only connection to brigade headquarters (HQ) was for the supply of drafts and recruits. The artillery militia units (sometimes referred to as regiments) already comprised a number of batteries, and were redesignated as brigades, losing their county titles in the process. The artillery volunteers, which had previously consisted of numerous independent Artillery Volunteer Corps (AVC) of various sizes, sometimes grouped into administrative brigades, had been consolidated into larger AVCs in 1881, which were now affiliated to the appropriate territorial division.

== Composition ==
Scottish Division, RA, listed as eighth in order of precedence, was organised within Scottish District with the following composition:

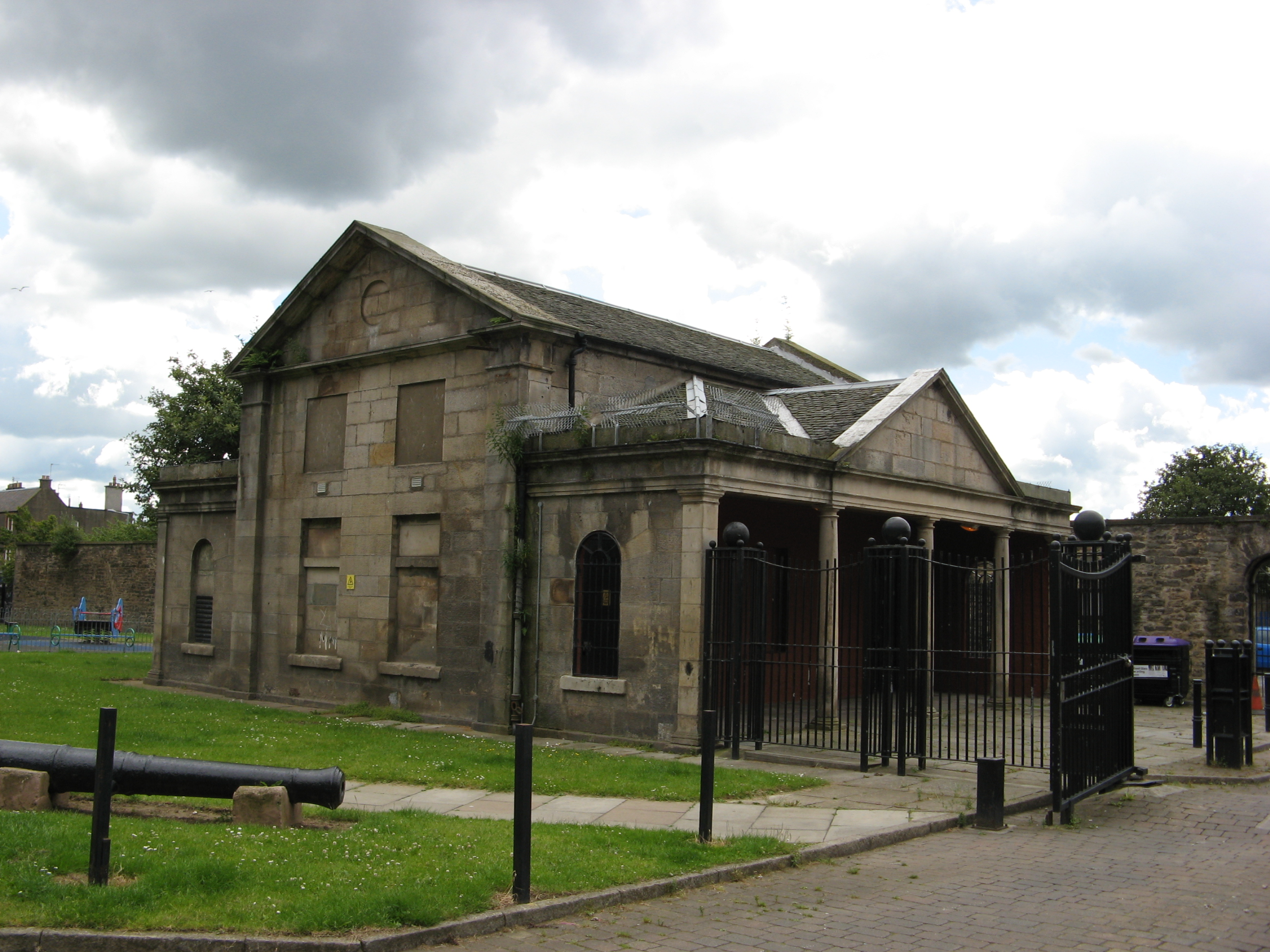
South Gatehouse of Leith Fort, headquarters of Scottish Division, RA.

- Headquarters (HQ) at Leith
- 1st Brigade
  - HQ at Leith
  - 1st Bty at Malta – formerly 8th Bty, 9th Bde
  - 2nd (Mountain) Bty at Murree Hills – formerly 6th Bty, 7th Bde
  - 3rd Bty in India – formerly 7th Bty, 7th Bde
  - 4th Bty at Sheerness – formerly 1st Bty, 9th Bde
  - 5th Bty in Egypt – formerly 1st Bty, 10th Bde
  - 6th Bty in Egypt – formerly 1st Bty, 11th Bde
  - 7th Bty at Dover – formerly 10th Bty, 9th Bde
  - 8th Bty at Sheerness – formerly 14th Bty, 9th Bde
  - 9th Bty at Bombay – formerly 15th Bty, 9th Bde
  - 10th Bty – new Bty formed 1887
  - Depot Bty at Leith – formerly Depot Bty, 4th Bde
- 2nd Brigade at Dunbar – formerly Haddington, Berwickshire, Linlithgow and Peebles Artillery Militia (6 btys)
- 3rd Brigade at Edinburgh – formerly Duke of Edinburgh's Own Edinburgh Artillery (6 btys)
- 4th Brigade at Cupar – formerly Fifeshire Artillery Militia (6 btys)
- 5th Brigade at Montrose – formerly Forfar and Kincardine Artillery (8 btys)
- 6th Brigade at Campbeltown – formerly Argyll and Bute Artillery Militia (5 btys)
- 1st Edinburgh (City) Artillery Volunteers at Edinburgh
- 1st Midlothian Artillery Volunteers at Leith
- 1st Banffshire Artillery Volunteers at Banff
- 1st Forfarshire Artillery Volunteers at Dundee
- 1st Renfrew and Dumbarton Artillery Volunteers at Greenock
- 1st Fife Artillery Volunteers at St Andrews
- 1st Haddington Artillery Volunteers at Dunbar
- 1st Lanarkshire Artillery Volunteers at Glasgow
- 1st Ayrshire and Galloway Artillery Volunteers at Ayr
- 1st Argyll and Bute Artillery Volunteers at Rothesay
- 1st Caithness Artillery Volunteers at Thurso
- 1st Aberdeenshire Artillery Volunteers at Aberdeen
- 1st Berwickshire Artillery Volunteers at Eyemouth
- 1st Inverness Artillery Volunteers at Inverness
- 1st Orkney Artillery Volunteers at Kirkwall

== Disbandment ==
On 1 July 1889 the garrison artillery was reorganised again into three large territorial divisions of garrison artillery (Eastern, Southern and Western) and one of mountain artillery. The assignment of units to them seemed geographically arbitrary, with the Scottish units being grouped in the Southern Division, for example, but this related to where the need for coastal artillery was greatest, rather than where the units recruited. The regular batteries were distributed across most of the divisions and completely renumbered.

== See also ==
- Royal Garrison Artillery
- List of Royal Artillery Divisions 1882–1902
- Eastern Division, Royal Artillery
- Southern Division, Royal Artillery
- Western Division, Royal Artillery
- Mountain Division, Royal Artillery
