= 1st Banffshire Artillery Volunteers =

1st Banffshire Artillery Volunteers 1st Banffshire Royal Garrison Artillery
- Active: 1859–1908
- Country: United Kingdom
- Branch: Volunteer Force
- Type: Artillery Volunteer Corps
- Role: Garrison Artillery
- Garrison/HQ: Banff

Commanders
- Colonel of the Regiment: Alexander Duff, 1st Duke of Fife

The 1st Banffshire Artillery Volunteers was a part-time unit of the British Army's Royal Artillery founded in Banffshire in Scotland in 1859. Through various reorganisations it served as auxiliary garrison artillery until 1908.

== Volunteer Force ==
The enthusiasm for the Volunteer movement following an invasion scare in 1859 saw the creation of many Rifle and Artillery Volunteer Corps composed of part-time soldiers eager to supplement the Regular British Army in time of need. By 1861 five Artillery Volunteer Corps (AVCs) had been formed in Banffshire:

- 1st (Macduff) Banffshire AVC formed before October 1859, originally as a subdivision, became a full battery 27 March 1860
- 2nd (Banff) Banffshire AVC formed on 29 December 1859, originally numbered 1st
- 3rd (Banff) Banffshire AVC formed on 5 April 1860; absorbed into 2nd AVC in 1864
- 4th (Portsoy) Banffshire AVC formed on 8 October 1860
- 5th (Cullen) Banffshire AVC formed on 18 February 1861

On 22 October 1861, these units were brought together into the 1st Administrative Brigade, Banffshire Artillery Volunteers, with its headquarters (HQ) at Banff. In 1863, the brigade was joined by the 1st Elgin AVC, which had been formed at Lossiemouth in Elginshire on 26 March 1860. A 2nd Elgin AVC was formed at Burghead on 16 October 1872 and was also included in the 1st Banff Admin Brigade. On 13 November 1875, a new 3rd Banffshire AVC was formed at Gardenstown to replace the unit disbanded in 1864.

=== Reorganisation ===
In December 1876, the artillery volunteers in North East Scotland were reorganised. The five Banff units joined the 1st Aberdeenshire Administrative Brigade and the two Elgin units joined the 1st Inverness-shire Administrative Brigade.

When the administrative brigades were consolidated in May 1880, the Banffshire AVCs were included in the new 1st Aberdeenshire AVC as Nos 9–13 Batteries. However, in May 1882, they were withdrawn, together with two Aberdeenshire batteries and the Lossiemouth battery from Elgin, to form the 1st Banffshire AVC with the subtitle 'Aberdeen, Banff and Elgin', and the following organisation:

- HQ at 6 Castle Street, Banff
- No 1 Battery at Macduff – former 1st Banff
- No 2 Battery at Banff – former 2nd Banff
- No 3 Battery at Gardenstown – former 3rd Banff; disbanded 1904
- No 4 Battery at Portsoy – former 4th Banff
- No 5 Battery at Cullen – former 5th Banff
- No 6 Battery at Peterhead – former 1st Aberdeenshire
- No 7 Battery at Fraserburgh – former 5th Aberdeenshire
- No 8 Battery at Lossiemouth – former 1st Elgin

The unit carried out its annual practice camp at Barry Buddon, and had five carbine ranges near company HQs.

=== Royal Garrison Artillery ===
In 1882, all the AVCs were affiliated to one of the territorial garrison divisions of the Royal Artillery (RA) and the 1st Banffshire AVC became part of the Scottish Division. In 1889 the structure was altered, and the corps joined the Southern Division. In 1899, the RA was divided into separate field and garrison branches, and the artillery volunteers were all assigned to the Royal Garrison Artillery (RGA). When the divisional structure was abolished the unit titles were changed on 1 January 1902, the Banff unit becoming the 1st Banffshire Royal Garrison Artillery (Volunteers).

== Territorial Force ==
When the Volunteers were subsumed into the new Territorial Force (TF) under the Haldane Reforms of 1908, the personnel of the 1st Banffshire and most of the 1st Aberdeenshire RGA (V) were combined to form a new I (or 1st) Highland Brigade, Royal Field Artillery. The new unit included a Banffshire Battery and the Banffshire Small Arms Ammunition Section of the Brigade Ammunition Column. However, the Banffshire Battery was disbanded in 1911 and replaced by another Aberdeen Battery.

== Uniforms and insignia ==
The original five Banff AVCs wore a uniform that closely followed that of the Royal Artillery, except that white/silver lace was worn in place of yellow/gold. After 1882 the 1st Banff AVC was one of the few Scottish artillery corps to have a Pipe band, which wore the Duff tartan of its Honorary Colonel.

== Commanding officers ==
The Commanding Officers (COs) of the unit were:

- J. Cruikshank, Major 22 October 1861, Lieutenant-Colonel 14 August 1863
- Lt-Col James Moir, 29 December 1865
- Lt-Col Francis W. Garden-Campbell, former Lieutenant in the Scots Fusilier Guards, 8 November 1873; on amalgamation with the 1st Aberdeen Admin Brigade he was appointed second Lt-Col of that unit, resuming command of the 1st Banff AVC when it became independent again
- Lt-Col Patrick Jamieson, VD, 7 October 1893
- Vacancy from 1896
- Lt-Col Charles G. Masson, 18 April 1900
- Lt-Col John James George, VD, 18 April 1907

== Honorary Colonel ==
Alexander Duff, Earl of Fife (later the 1st Duke of Fife, KT, GCVO, VD), was appointed Honorary Colonel of the unit on 15 March 1884.
