= 1st Caithness Artillery Volunteers =

1st Caithness Artillery Volunteers 1st Caithness (Caithness and Sutherland) Royal Garrison Artillery (Volunteers)
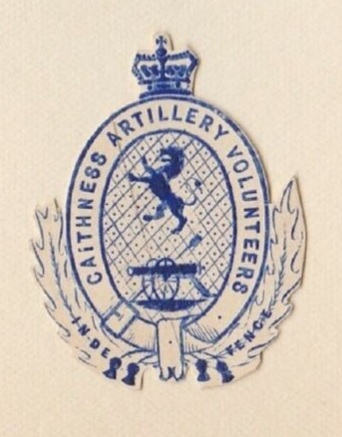
- Letterhead, Caithness artillery Volunteers, c1870
- Active: 6 March 1860–31 March 1908
- Country: United Kingdom
- Branch: Volunteer Force
- Type: Artillery Regiment
- Role: Coastal Artillery
- Garrison/HQ: Wick; Thurso (from 1882)

The 1st Caithness Artillery Volunteers were formed in 1860 as a response to a French invasion threat. They served as a Coast Artillery unit and continued in existence as part of the Royal Garrison Artillery until being disbanded on the formation of the Territorial Force in 1908.

== Volunteer Force ==
Enthusiasm for the Volunteer movement following an invasion scare in 1859 saw the creation of many Rifle, Artillery and Engineer Volunteer Corps composed of part-time soldiers eager to supplement the Regular British Army in time of need. The 1st Caithness Artillery Volunteer Corps (AVC) was formed on 6 March 1860 at Wick, a 1st Sub-Division was formed at Thurso on 24 April, was increased to a battery and became the 2nd AVC on 28 December, and the 3rd AVC was formed at Lybster on 30 September 1861. In 1863 these units, together with the AVCs from Orkney and Ross-shire, were formed into the 1st Administrative Brigade, Caithness Artillery Volunteers, with its headquarters (HQ) at Wick, to which other Caithness units were added as they were formed:

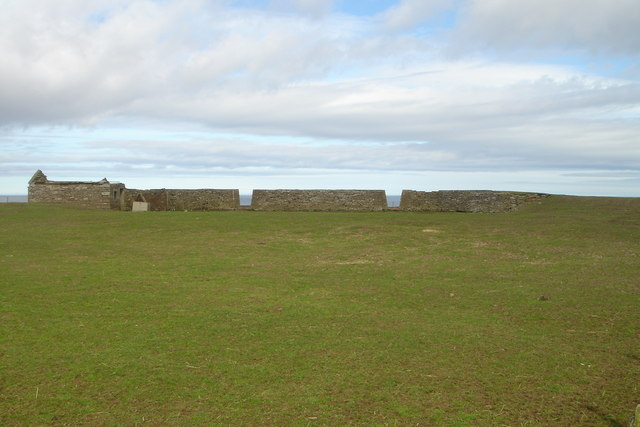
Gun battery at Castletown, used by the 5th Caithness AVC.

- 1st (Wick) Caithness AVC
- 2nd (Thurso) Caithness AVC
- 3rd (Lybster) Caithness AVC
- 4th (Mey) Caithness AVC formed at Barrogill, Mey, on 1 December 1866, as one battery
- 5th (Castletown) Caithness AVC formed at Castletown on 1 December 1866, as one battery
- 1st (Kirkwall) Orkney AVC joined 1863
- 2nd (Sanday) Orkney AVC joined 1863
- 3rd (Shapinsay) Orkney AVC joined 1863
- 4th (Stromness) Orkney AVC joined 1863
- 1st (Stornoway) Ross-shire AVC joined 1863

Once a 5th Orkney AVC had been raised in 1865 there were moves for Orkney to have its own brigade, and this was organised on 15 March 1867; at the same time the 1st Ross-shire joined the 2nd Ross-shire in the 1st Inverness-shire Admin Brigade. In their place, the 1st Caithness Admin Brigade took over the AVCs in Sutherland from the Inverness-shire brigade, giving it the following organisation:

- 1st (Wick) Caithness AVC, increased to one and a half batteries in 1867, and to two batteries in 1870
- 2nd (Thurso) Caithness AVC, increased to two batteries in 1870
- 3rd (Lybster) Caithness AVC, disbanded 1873
- 4th (Mey) Caithness AVC
- 5th (Castletown) Caithness AVC
- 6th (Thrumster) Caithness AVC formed at Thrumster on 4 May 1867, as one battery, disbanded 1878
- 1st (Helmsdale) Sutherland AVC formed at Helmsdale 26 April 1860, joined 15 March 1867
- 2nd (Golspie) Sutherland AVC formed at Golspie 18 February 1867, joined 15 March 1867

Volunteer corps were consolidated into larger units on 1 May 1880, when the 1st Admin Brigade became the 1st Caithness (Caithness and Sutherland) Artillery Volunteers, with the individual corps as numbered companies:

- Nos 1 and 2 at Wick (late 1st Caithness)
- Nos 3 and 4, at Thurso (late 2nd Caithness)
- No 5 at Mey (late 4th Caithness)
- No 6 at Castletown (late 5th Caithness)
- No 7 at Helmsdale (late 1st Sutherland)
- No 8 at Golspie (late 2nd Sutherland)

From 1 April 1882 all AVCs were affiliated to a division of the Royal Artillery (RA), the Scottish Division in the case of the 1st Orkney, moving to the Southern Division when the numbers were reduced on 1 July 1889. In October 1882, the unit's HQ transferred from Wick to Thurso. In 1894, Nos 1 and 2 Companies at Wick ceased to exist, but in 1897 Mo 1 was resuscitated, the corps then consisting of seven garrison companies, No 2 being vacant. It had a drill battery at each station, and possessed six firing ranges for carbine practice.

== Royal Garrison Artillery ==
From 1 June 1899 all artillery volunteers became part of the Royal Garrison Artillery (RGA), and when the RA abolished its divisional structure on 1 January 1902 the unit was redesignated the 1st Caithness (Caithness and Sutherland) Royal Garrison Artillery (Volunteers).

The unit's commanding officer, Lieutenant-Colonel Sir John Sinclair, 7th Baronet of Dunbeath, commanded the 62nd (Middlesex) Company, Imperial Yeomanry, in the Second Boer War and was awarded a Distinguished Service Order.

When the Volunteers were subsumed into the new Territorial Force (TF) under the Haldane Reforms of 1908, the unit was disbanded on 31 March.

== Uniforms and insignia ==
The first uniform of the Caithness corps was similar to that of the Royal Artillery, but with scarlet cuffs and white cord and piping. Busbies and white belts were worn. The officers had silver lace, and their tunics were piped all round with silver cord, and had silver lace on the skirts. The early pattern brass shoulder title read 'C.A.V.', later '1/RA/Caithness' in three tiers.

== Commanding officers ==
The following served as commanding officer of the 1st Caithness Artillery Volunteers and Caithness RGA

- Lt-Col Sir Robert Sinclair, 9th Baronet, of Murkle, former captain in the 38th Foot, appointed 10 October 1864
- Lt-Col George Sinclair, 15th Earl of Caithness, appointed 17 June 1882, died 25 May 1889
- Col George R. Lawson, appointed 25 May 1889
- Lt-Col Sir John Sinclair, 7th Baronet of Dunbeath, DSO, VD, appointed 2 July 1892
- Col Alexander McDonald, VD, appointed 9 May 1900
- Col David Keith Murray, VD, appointed 5 April 1905

== Honorary Colonel ==
The following served as Honorary Colonel of the unit:

- James Sinclair, 14th Earl of Caithness, appointed 21 August 1867, died 28 March 1881
- Sir Robert Sinclair of Murkle, VD, former CO, appointed 27 July 1881
- Sir John Sinclair of Dunbeath, DSO, VD, former CO, appointed 7 November 1900

== See also ==
- 1st Berwickshire Artillery Volunteers
- 1st Midlothian Artillery Volunteers

== External sources ==
- Caithness Field Club
- Artillery Volunteers Drill Hall at Mey
