= Durham Artillery Militia =

Auxiliary unit of the British Army

Durham Artillery Militia 2nd Brigade, Northern Division, RA Durham Artillery (Western Division) RA Durham Royal Garrison Artillery (M)
- Active: 20 July 1853–31 October 1909
- Country: United Kingdom
- Branch: Militia
- Role: Garrison Artillery
- Part of: Northern Division, RA (1882–89); Western Division, RA (1889–1902)
- Garrison/HQ: Bishop Auckland (1853–61); Hartlepool (1861–95); Sunderland Barracks (1895–1909)
- Engagements: Second Boer War

The Durham Artillery Militia was a part-time reserve unit of Britain's Royal Artillery based in County Durham from 1853 to 1909. Volunteers from the unit served in the Second Boer War where they distinguished themselves fighting as infantry in the defence of Fort Prospect.

== Background ==
The long-standing national Militia of the United Kingdom was revived by the Militia Act 1852, enacted during a period of international tension. As before, units were raised and administered on a county basis, and filled by voluntary enlistment (although conscription by means of the Militia Ballot might be used if the counties failed to meet their quotas). Training was for 56 days on enlistment, then for 21–28 days per year, during which the men received full army pay. Under the Act, Militia units could be embodied by Royal Proclamation for full-time service in three circumstances:

1. 'Whenever a state of war exists between Her Majesty and any foreign power'.
2. 'In all cases of invasion or upon imminent danger thereof'.
3. 'In all cases of rebellion or insurrection'.

The 1852 Act introduced Militia Artillery units in addition to the traditional infantry regiments. Their role was to man coastal defences and fortifications, relieving the Royal Artillery (RA) for active service.

== History ==
Under the 1852 reorganisation, County Durham's quota was assessed as 2000 men, to consist of two infantry regiments and an artillery corps. The new artillery unit was raised on 20 July 1853 as the Durham Artillery Militia, with four batteries. Its headquarters was at Bishop Auckland until 1861 when it moved to Hartlepool. A fifth battery was raised in 1874.

The Marquess of Londonderry, as Lord Lieutenant of the County Palatine of Durham, appointed Henry Stobart, a Half-pay Lieutenant in the RA, to be Captain Commandant (with the rank of major) of the Durham Artillery Militia on 20 July 1853, and he was promoted to lieutenant-colonel on 4 October 1854. Colonel Henry Stobart (died 26 August 1866) was the proprietor of Etherley Colliery, a director of the Stockton and Darlington Railway, and later of the North Eastern Railway. He remained in command until 6 September 1859 when he became honorary colonel and was succeeded as lieutenant-colonel commandant by Major George Hall of the Royal Lancashire Militia Artillery and formerly of the Madras Artillery.

Following the Cardwell Reforms a mobilisation scheme began to appear in the Army List from December 1875. This assigned places in an order of battle of the 'Garrison Army' to militia artillery units: the Durham Artillery's war station was in the Sheerness Division of the Thames and Medway Defences.

The Artillery Militia was reorganised into 11 divisions of garrison artillery in 1882, and the Durham unit, with a sixth battery, became the senior militia unit in the new Northern Division, taking the title of 2nd Brigade, Northern Division, RA (the 1st Brigade comprised the Regular RA units of the division). When the Northern Division was abolished in 1889 its militia were transferred to the Western Division and the unit's title was altered to The Durham Artillery (Western Division) RA. The unit's HQ transferred from Hartlepool to Sunderland Barracks in 1895.

From 1899 the militia artillery formally became part of the Royal Garrison Artillery (RGA), and when the RGA abolished the divisional structure the unit at Sunderland took the title of The Durham RGA (M) on 1 January 1902.

== Embodiments ==
The Durham Artillery Militia was twice embodied for full-time service to release Regular RA units for overseas service:

- 5 April 1859 to 25 March 1861 during the Indian Mutiny, when it was embodied at Bishop Auckland and stationed first at Gosport, then at Portsmouth. before returning to Gosport. In 1860 it moved to Parkhurst, Isle of Wight and then to Plymouth
- 1 May to 11 October during the Second Boer War.

== South Africa ==
Under the Militia Acts, units could also volunteer for overseas service. The Durham Artillery did so in 1900, and was one of the six Militia Artillery units permitted to form a Service Company of volunteers to serve in South Africa alongside the Regulars.

The service company of the Durham Artillery, consisting of five officers and 170 other ranks, sailed on 24 March 1900 and landed at Durban. On arrival they were combined with the service company of the Duke of Edinburgh's Own Edinburgh Artillery, the composite unit being designated the Durham & Edinburgh Division RGA, under the command of Lt-Col H.P. Ditmas of the Durham Artillery. Harold Ditmas was a solicitor and longtime auxiliary officer, first as a lieutenant with the 3rd (York) Yorkshire (West Riding) Artillery Volunteers, later with the Durham Artillery, which he had commanded since 1895.

In July 1900 the composite company moved to Eshowe in Zululand, where having swapped their artillery Carbines for infantry rifles they were engaged in preventing Boer border raids. In September a 3000-strong Boer Commando under Louis Botha threatened Zululand, and a 51-strong detachment of the company without guns was sent to Fort Prospect, near Melmoth, to prepare defences. Assisted by 35 men of B (Dorsetshire Regiment), Company, 5th Division Mounted Infantry, and all under the command of Capt A.C. Rowley of 2nd Battalion Dorsets, they dug trenches and constructed stone sangars.

At 04.15 on 26 September, the detachment at Fort Prospect were warned by a native that hundreds of Boers were on their way. Fifteen minutes later the position was attacked under cover of mist by 400–500 men of the Ermelo Commando or the Carolina Commando, led by General Cecil 'Cherry' Cheere Emmett. The brunt of the attack fell on two sangars on the north and west of the position held by the Durham Company acting as infantry. Although the Boers broke through the Wire obstacle and got within 20 yards (18 m) of the sangars, they held out and Rowley was able to repulse the attack with the aid of a Maxim gun. The Boers drew off at 06.30 and contented themselves with rifle fire against the completely surrounded fort. A second attack at 10.00 got as far as the rear trench where they were driven off by Serjeant F. Doyle's party. About that time a party of 14 Nongqayi (Zululand Police) under Serjeant Gumbi fought their way through the Boer lines to join the defenders. The Boer fire slackened off towards evening, and they withdrew at about 18.30.

One Bombardier and five gunners of the Durham Artillery were wounded in this action. Lieutenant-General Neville Lyttelton recommended Lt R.G.M. Johnson for the Distinguished Service Order (DSO) and Sjt Doyle and two Bombardiers of the battery for the Distinguished Conduct Medal (DCM) for their actions, but these awards were not made. However, all four were later Mentioned in dispatches. Later in the war, Lt-Col Ditmas, Major James Gowans, Capt Hugh Streatfeild and Company Serjeant Major O'Neill of the Durham Artillery were also mentioned in dispatches, and Maj Gowans was awarded a DSO at the end of the war.

After the action at Eshowe, the Durhams were marched to Durban. The remainder of the Durham & Edinburgh Division was brought down from the Natal–Transvaal frontier and sailed to Bombay in India guarding Boer prisoners of war. Part of the unit remained in India guarding prisoners for some time, the rest embarked for home in November 1901, arriving a dew days after the company from Durban. Officers and men of the service company received the Queen's South Africa Medal and King's South Africa Medal with clasps for 'Cape Colony', 'Orange Free State' and 'South Africa 1901'.

== Disbandment ==
After the Boer War, the future of the Militia was called into question. There were moves to reform the Auxiliary Forces (Militia, Yeomanry and Volunteers) to take their place in the six Army Corps proposed by St John Brodrick as Secretary of State for War. Some batteries of Militia Artillery were to be converted to field artillery. However, little of Brodrick's scheme was carried out.

Under the sweeping Haldane Reforms of 1908, the Militia was replaced by the Special Reserve, a semi-professional force whose role was to provide reinforcement drafts for Regular units serving overseas in wartime. Although the majority of the officers and men of the Durham RGA (M) accepted transfer to the Special Reserve Royal Field Artillery, becoming the Durham Royal Field Reserve Artillery on 5 July 1908, all these units were later disbanded. The Durham unit disbanded on 31 October 1909. Instead the men of the RFA Special Reserve would form Brigade Ammunition Columns for the Regular RFA brigades on the outbreak of war.

In World War I, Ditmas was re-employed as a Temporary Lt-Col until 1917.

== Equipment ==
Although the 19th-century role of the militia artillery was usually to man guns in fixed fortifications, photographs of the Durham RGA (M) at its annual training camp at Southsea in 1906 show the men working with horsedrawn 4.7-inch heavy guns, as was being done with the Volunteer batteries in Brodrick's scheme.

== Honorary colonels ==
The following served as honorary colonel of the unit:

- Lt-Col Henry Stobart, former CO, appointed 6 September 1859
- Lt-Gen Sir Henry Havelock-Allan, 1st Baronet, VC, KCB, appointed 7 May 1887
