= Berwickshire Artillery Volunteers =

- Active: 1860–1908
- Country: United Kingdom
- Branch: Volunteer Force
- Type: Artillery Battery
- Role: Garrison Artillery; Coastal Artillery
- Garrison/HQ: Eyemouth

The Berwickshire Artillery Volunteers were formed in 1860 as part of the Volunteer Force, as a result of a French invasion threat. They served as a Coastal Artillery unit and continued in existence until being disbanded on the formation of the Territorial Force in 1908.

== History ==
The enthusiasm for the Volunteer movement following an invasion scare in 1859 saw the creation of many Artillery Volunteer Corps (AVCs) composed of part-time soldiers eager to supplement the Regular Royal Artillery in time of need. The 1st Berwickshire Artillery Volunteer Corps was formed at Eyemouth on 6 April 1860, as one battery. A 2nd Berwick Artillery Volunteer Corps, also of one battery, was formed at Coldingham in February 1861 but no officers were commissioned into it until 10 July 1863. From 1864 both batteries were attached for administration to the 1st Edinburgh (City) Artillery Volunteers.

The Berwickshire AVCs should not be confused with the 1st Berwick-on-Tweed AVC, which was attached to the 1st Newcastle-upon-Tyne Artillery Volunteers, the county of Berwickshire being in Scotland but the town of Berwick-upon-Tweed being in England.

The 1st Berwickshire AVC had a drill-battery and headquarters at Eyemouth and a rifle range at Linkum, two miles from Eyemouth. The drill hall of the battery at Coldingham is still in use today as the village hall. The 2nd Berwickshire AVC was disbanded in 1883.

On 1 April 1882 all artillery volunteer units were affiliated to one of the territorial divisions of the Royal Artillery (RA), with the 1st Berwickshire battery (still attached to the 1st Edinburgh) joining the Scottish Division. When the number of divisions was reduced from 1 July 1889, the unit joined the Southern Division.

In 1899 the artillery Volunteers were transferred to the Royal Garrison Artillery (RGA) and with the abolition of the RA's divisional organisation on 1 January 1902 the unit became the 1st Berwickshire Royal Garrison Artillery (Volunteers).

On the formation of the Territorial Force in 1908 the unit was no longer required and was disbanded.

== Officers commanding ==
The captains commanding the 1st Berwickshire AVC were:

- J. K. L'Amy, 6 April 1860
- J. Gibson, February 1861
- Vacant 1862 to 1867
- P Tod, 14 November 1867
- Vacant 1876 to 1880
- John Johnston 30 March 1881
- A Johnston 9 January 1889
- D Hume 1 February 1898
- G J Gibson 21 February 1903
- Chas. M. Alexander 16 March 1907.

== See also ==
- 1st Midlothian Artillery Volunteers
- 1st Caithness Artillery Volunteers
