= 1st Inverness Artillery Volunteers =

1st Inverness Artillery Volunteers Highland Artillery Volunteers Highland RGA (V)
- Active: 1860–1908
- Country: United Kingdom
- Branch: Volunteer Force
- Role: Coast Artillery; Field Artillery
- Garrison/HQ: Inverness

Commanders
- Notable commanders: Col Aeneas Mackintosh of Raigmore

The 1st Inverness-shire Artillery Volunteers, later the Highland Artillery Volunteers, was a Scottish auxiliary unit of the British Army from 1860 to 1908. With its headquarters in Inverness, it was recruited for home defence from a number of shires in the northern Scottish Highlands. It later provided the basis for a number of Territorial Force units in the Highlands.

== Volunteer Force ==
The enthusiasm for the Volunteer movement following an invasion scare in 1859 saw the creation of Rifle, Artillery and Engineer Volunteer Corps in towns up and down the United Kingdom, composed of part-time soldiers eager to supplement the Regular British Army in time of need. The city of Inverness had already raised the Inverness Rifles (later the 1st (Inverness Highland) Volunteer Battalion, Cameron Highlanders) when a meeting at the Trades Hall on 15 November 1859 led to the raising of the Inverness Artisan Rifles consisting entirely of carpenters and other tradesmen. Soon afterwards it was decided that this should become the Inverness Artisan Artillery Volunteers, and in January 1860 its services were accepted as the 1st Inverness-shire Artillery Volunteer Corps (AVC). The first officers' commissions were issued on 4 February 1860. A second AVC was formed at the same time, but they soon consolidated as a single corps of two batteries; 3rd and 4th Batteries were formed on 4 May, a 5th in December 1864 and the 6th in January 1865. By 1863, the small AVCs of the neighbouring shires began to be attached to the 1st Inverness for drill and administrative purposes:

- 1st Inverness-shire AVC – six batteries by 1865
- 2nd Inverness-shire AVC – to 1st Inverness 1860
- 1st (Helmsdale) Sutherland AVC – formed 26 April 1860; transferred to 1st Caithness Artillery Volunteers 1867
- 2nd (Golspie) Sutherland AVC – formed 1862; transferred to 1st Caithness 1867
- 1st Cromarty AVC – formed 8 June 1860
- 1st Nairn AVC – formed 10 April 1860, 2nd Battery 6 October 1860
- 1st (Stornoway) Ross-shire AVC – formed 16 February 1860; joined from 1st Caithness 1867
- 2nd (Lochcarron) Ross–shire AVC – formed 21 August 1866
- 3rd (Balmacara) Ross-shire AVC – formed by August 1868 but disappeared within a few months

Precedence among AVCs was by shire:

- 34 – Inverness-shire
- 35 – Elgin
- 42 – Cromarty
- 43 – Ross-shire
- 45 – Nairn
- 46 – Sutherland

=== Consolidation ===
In December 1876, the artillery volunteers in North East Scotland were reorganised: the 1st Inverness AVC became the 1st Administrative Brigade, Inverness-shire Artillery Volunteers and two Elginshire units joined from the 1st Banffshire Artillery Volunteers:

- 1st (Lossiemouth) Elgin AVC – formed 16 March 1860
- 2nd (Burghead) Elgin AVC – formed 16 October 1872

The Volunteers were consolidated into larger units in May 1880, when the Admin Brigade became the 1st Inverness-shire (Inverness, Cromarty, Nairn, Ross and Elgin) Artillery Volunteers with the following organisation:

- Headquarters at Inverness
- Nos 1–6 Companies at Inverness
- No 7 Company at Lossiemouth – returned to 1st Banffshire 1882 (8–13 then renumbered)
- No 8 Company at Burghead
- No 9 Company at Cromarty
- No 10 Company at Stornoway
- No 11 Company at Lochcarron
- Nos 12–13 Companies at Nairn

On 1 April 1882, all artillery volunteer units were affiliated to one of the territorial divisions of the Royal Artillery (RA), with the 1st Inverness joining the Scottish Division. When the number of divisions was reduced from 1 July 1889, the unit joined the Southern Division. On 1 February 1890, the unit was redesignated the Highland Artillery Volunteers with the '(Inverness, Cromarty, Nairn, Ross and Elgin)' subtitle restored the following year.

=== Position artillery ===
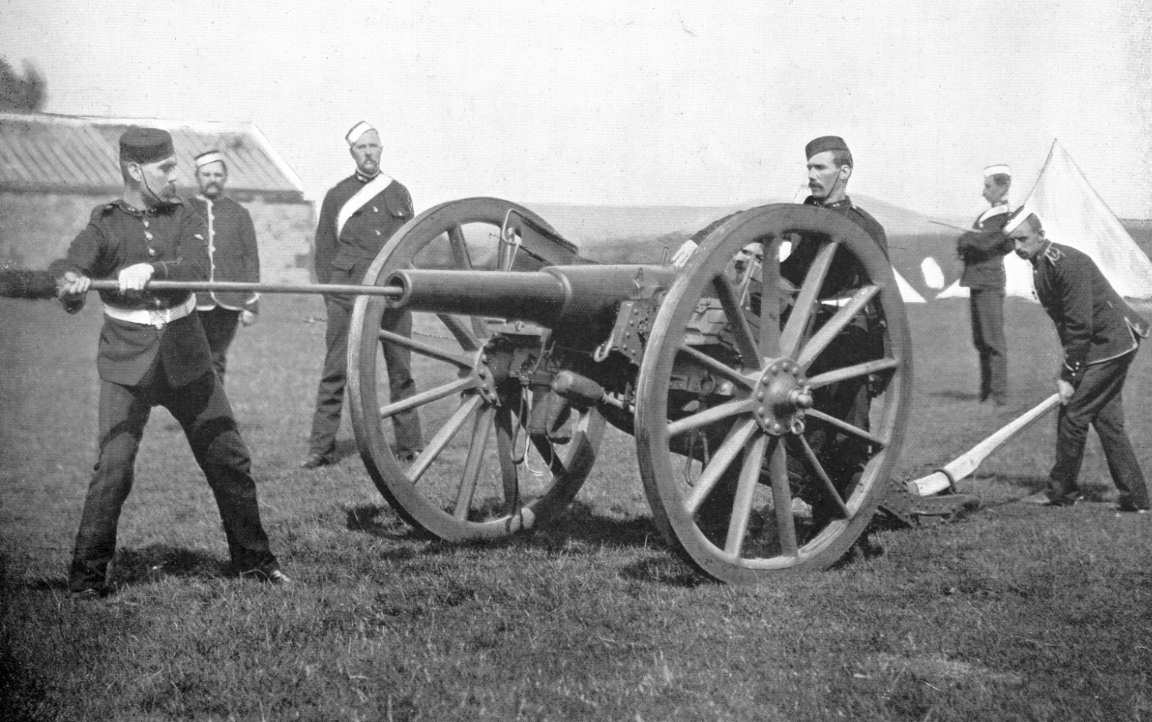
16-pounder RML gun manned by Artillery Volunteers in 1897.

Although primarily manning fixed coast defence artillery, some of the early Artillery Volunteers organised semi-mobile 'position batteries' of smooth-bore field guns. The 1st Inverness had two 6-pounder brass smoothbore field guns from 1867, replaced by two 40-pounder Armstrong rifled breechloading guns in 1873. But the War Office refused to pay for the upkeep of horses, and the corps had to provide agricultural horses when required. In 1888, the 'position artillery' concept was revived and some Volunteer companies were reorganised as position batteries to work alongside the Volunteer infantry brigades. The 1st Inverness was supplied with a battery of 16-pounder rifled muzzle-loading guns in 1889 and, on 14 July 1892, Nos 1 and 2 Companies were reorganised as No 1 Position Battery, when the remaining companies were renumbered 2–11.

=== Training ===
The corps had a drill hall with stores, gun-sheds etc at Inverness. It carried out its training and gun-practice at camp, and used the rifle range of the 1st Volunteer Battalion of the Cameron Highlanders at Longman, Inverness. Each of the five outlying companies had a carbine range. In 1894, No 1 Position Battery won the Queen's Cup at the Scottish National Artillery Association's camp at Barry Buddon.

On 1 June 1899, all the volunteer artillery units became part of the Royal Garrison Artillery (RGA) and with the abolition of the RA's divisional organisation on 1 January 1902, the unit became the Highland RGA (Volunteers).

During the Second Boer War, some 500 men from the unit volunteered for active service, but only 28 were accepted.

== Territorial Force ==
When the Volunteers were subsumed into the new Territorial Force (TF) under the Haldane Reforms of 1908, the Highland RGA was broken up, but its various shire contingents contributed experienced men to a number of newly formed TF units:

- Ross & Cromarty Territorial Association:
  - Ross & Cromarty Mountain Battery, RGA
  - 4th Highland (Mountain) Ammunition Column, RGA
  - North Scottish RGA
- Inverness Territorial Association:
  - Inverness-shire Royal Horse Artillery (RHA)
  - Highland Mounted Brigade Transport and Supply Column, Army Service Corps
- Nairn Territorial Association:
  - 6th Battalion, Seaforth Highlanders (proposed, not carried out)
  - Highland Mounted Brigade Ammunition Column, RHA

== Uniforms ==
The original uniform of the 1st Inverness AVC was a blue tunic with long skirts, scarlet collar and cuffs, black braiding round the edges, five rows of black lace across the chest and a black Austrian knot on the sleeve. The trousers were blue with a scarlet stripe, the peaked cap (or French style Kepi) had a black band and scarlet piping; black waistbelts were worn. In 1861, the Busby was adopted as the head-dress, and in 1863 the uniform was assimilated with that of the RA with white cords and white waist- and pouch-belts. The busby was replaced by a round Forage cap, and then by the blue Home Service helmet. The buttons had a field gun within a circle inscribed 'INVERNESS ARTILLERY VOLUNTEERS'. The 1st Nairn AVC wore a uniform similar to the RA, but with scarlet cuffs and white cord; the peaked Shako was similar to the cap of the 1st Inverness, but carried an upright white horsehair plume. The shako plate had the intertwined letters 'NAV' over the county precedence number 45 above a gun, all within a wreath on an eight-pointed star surmounted by a crown.

== Commanders ==
=== Commanding Officers ===
The following officers commanded the unit during its existence:

- Major William Fraser Tytler of Aldourie and Balnain, appointed 23 June 1860, promoted to Lieutenant-Colonel 24 January 1865
- Lt-Col Aeneas Mackintosh of Raigmore, appointed 13 November 1869; Lt-Col Commandant of Admin Brigade 1 December 1876
- Lt-Col Comdt Donald Davidson, appointed 14 January 1880
- Lt-Col Comdt W. Fraser, VD, appointed 14 November 1885
- Lt-Col Comdt James E.B. Baillie of Douchfour, MVO, VD, former captain, 3rd (Militia) Battalion, Northumberland Fusiliers appointed 25 July 1894

=== Honorary colonel ===
The following served as honorary colonel of the unit:

- Col W. Fraser Tytler, former CO, appointed 13 November 1869
- Col A.W. Mackintosh, VD, former CO, appointed 19 May 1880
- Col W. Fraser, VD, former CO, appointed 2 January 1901
