= 1st Orkney Artillery Volunteers =

Coast defence artillery volunteers

1st Orkney Artillery Volunteers Orkney Royal Garrison Artillery
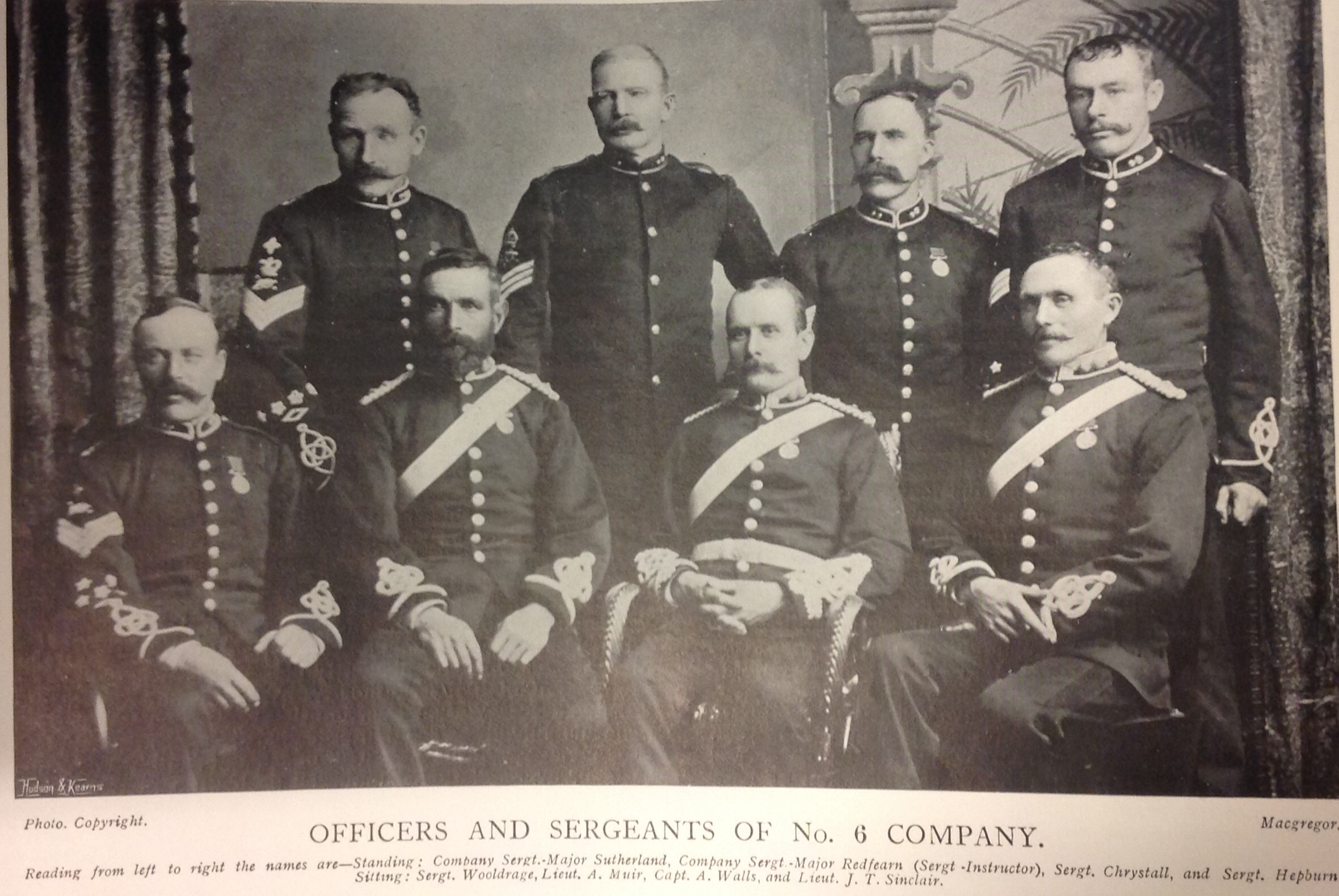
- Number 6 Company, 1st Orkney RGA (Volunteers) in 1902
- Active: 1860–1915; 1920–1922
- Country: United Kingdom
- Branch: Volunteer Force/Territorial Force
- Role: Coastal Artillery
- Size: 10 Companies
- Garrison/HQ: Kirkwall

The 1st Orkney Artillery Volunteers (OAV) was a part-time unit of Britain's Royal Artillery formed in the Orkney Islands in 1860 as a response to a French invasion threat. The unit served as coast artillery until it was disbanded after World War I.

== Precursor unit ==
Numerous Volunteer units had been organised across Britain at the time for home defenceof the French Revolutionary Wars, and some of these had taken on the role of manning coast artillery guns. One such unit, the Kirkwall Gunners, was in existence at Kirkwall on Mainland, Orkney, as early as 1801, but little is known of its history. It was probably absorbed into the Orkney Volunteer Infantry and disbanded by the end of the Napoleonic Wars.

== Volunteer Force ==
Renewed enthusiasm for the Volunteer movement following an invasion scare in 1859 saw the creation of many Rifle, Artillery and Engineer Volunteer Corps composed of part-time soldiers eager to supplement the Regular British Army in time of need. A public meeting on 29 December 1859 resolved to raise a volunteer company in Orkney, and a further meeting in early January 1860 decided that it should be an artillery volunteer corps (AVC). The 1st Orkney Artillery Volunteer Corps (OAV) was accepted for service by the War Office on 12 March 1860, and over 50 volunteers gathered at Kirkwall that month, when John Heddle of Melsetter was chosen as Captain. A battery with two 32-pounder guns was erected at Cromwell's Fort in the charge of the Sergeant-instructor. Over the following years the gunners practised gun drill and target firing with the heavy guns from the fort and musketry with carbines at a range on Mount Road. The first headquarters (HQ) was an office in Broad Street, then a wooden building on the Kirk Green until that was replaced by a purpose-built drill hall on reclaimed land on the shore of the Peerie Sea.

Other AVCs followed across the islands, and from 1863 they were all administered by the 1st Administrative Brigade, Caithness Artillery Volunteers:

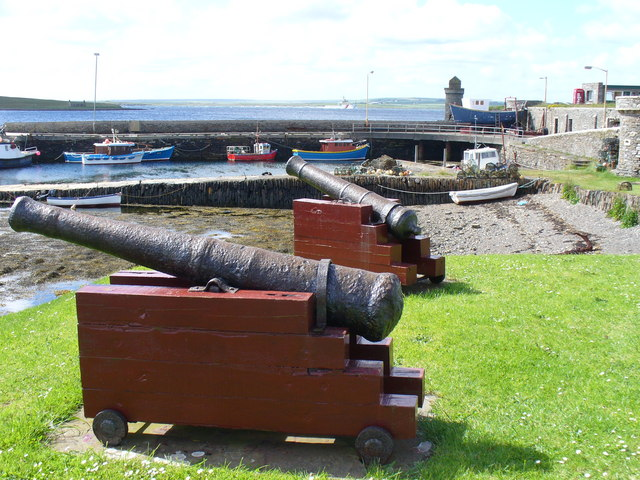
Decorative cannon at Balfour Harbour on Shapinsay.

- 1st (Kirkwall) OAV
- 2nd (Sanday) OAV – formed at Scar House on the Isle of Sanday, 23 June 1863 under Capt James Scarth
- 3rd (Shapinsay) OAV – formed at Balfour on Shapinsay Island 10 July 1863 under Capt David Balfour, with a battery at Fort Eleanor
- 4th (Stromness) OAV – formed at Stromness, Mainland, 23 June 1863 under Capt John Stanger of Ness
- 5th (Stronsay) OAV – formed at Stronsay Island 17 August 1865 under Capt Peter A. Calder
- 6th (Holm) OAV – formed at Holm, Mainland, 28 November 1866 under Capt Alex. Sutherland Graeme
- 7th (Firth) OAV – formed at Firth, Mainland, 31 October 1868; disbanded 1877
- 8th (Evie) OAV – formed at Evie, Mainland, 25 June 1870 under Capt Joseph R. Holmes; renumbered 7th in 1877
- 9th (Rousay) OAV – formed at the Isle of Rousay 30 December 1874 under Capt John Macrae; renumbered 8th in 1877, moved to Kirkwall 1886
- 10th (Birsay) OAV – formed at Birsay, Mainland, 2 March 1877 under Capt William J. Isbister; renumbered 9th in 1877

Some 70 volunteers were raised for a corps at South Ronaldsay and drills commenced, but no officer candidates came forward and the unit was abandoned. Once a fifth OAV had been raised there were moves for Orkney to have its own brigade, and Capt David Balfour of the 3rd (Shapinsay) OAV was appointed Lieutenant-Colonel of a new 1st Administrative Brigade, Orkney Artillery Volunteers on 15 March 1867 with Capt Alex Bain of the 1st (Kirkwall) OAV as Major.

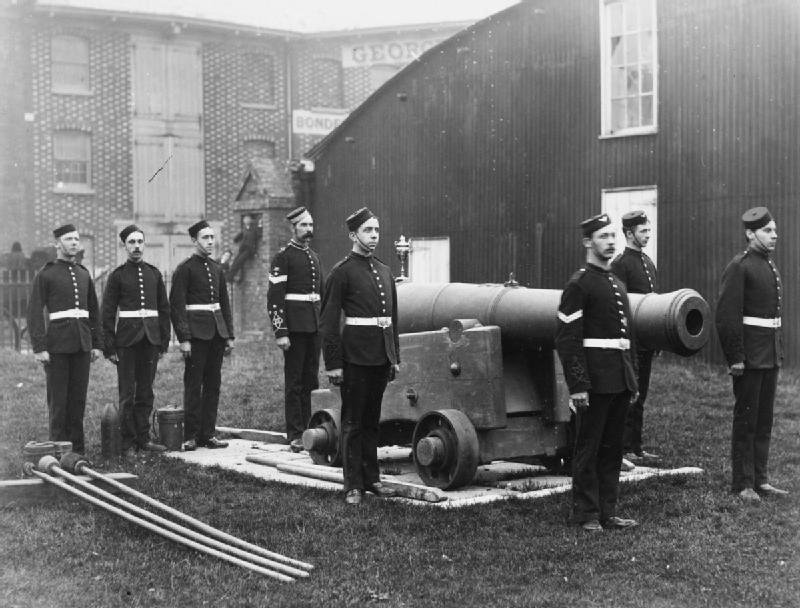
Artillery Volunteers at drill with 64-pounder gun at drill, ca1895.

Volunteer corps were consolidated into larger units in 1880, when the 1st Admin Brigade became simply the 1st Orkney Artillery Volunteers, with the individual corps as numbered companies. On 1 April 1882 all AVCs were affiliated to a territorial garrison division of the Royal Artillery (RA), the Scottish Division in the case of the 1st Orkney, moving to the Southern Division when the numbers were reduced on 1 July 1889. By 1894 No 6 Company was at Holm and Fort Alexander, No 9 at Birsay and Douby.

The unit had its headquarters and drill hall at Kirkwall, and each battery had its own drill hall, armoury, sergeant-instructor's cottage, practice battery of two guns (four at Kirkwall) and a carbine range. The practice batteries were re-armed with old 64-pounder RML guns, so serious training on modern guns was carried out at the annual camp.

From 1 June 1899 all artillery volunteers became part of the Royal Garrison Artillery (RGA), and when the RA abolished its divisional structure on 1 January 1902 the unit was redesignated the 1st Orkney Royal Garrison Artillery (Volunteers).

== Territorial Force ==
When the Volunteers were subsumed into the new Territorial Force (TF) under the Haldane Reforms of 1908, the Orkney RGA transferred as a 'defended ports unit' with minor changes to organisation and uniforms. Headquarters remained at Kirkwall with the companies located as follows:

- No 1 Company at Kirkwall
- No 2 Company at Isle of Sanday
- No 3 Company at Balfour, Shapinsay
- No 4 Company at Stromness
- No 5 Company at Evie
- No 6 Company at Holm
- No 7 Company at Kirkwall

== World War I ==
On the outbreak of war TF units mobilised and went to their war stations: the coast defences around Orkney and Fair Isle in the case of the Orkney RGA. Shortly afterwards, members of the TF were invited to volunteer for Overseas Service, and the majority did so. Soon the TF RGA companies that had volunteered for overseas service were supplying trained gunners to RGA units serving overseas. Although most defended ports units provided cadres to form complete siege artillery batteries for front line service from New Army ('Kitchener's Army') volunteers, the Orkney RGA does not appear to have been used in this way.

In 1915 it was announced that the Royal Navy, which was already responsible for the defence of the Grand Fleet's anchorage at Scapa Flow, would take over the defences of the whole of Orkney. The Orkney RGA was replaced by the Royal Marine Artillery, and because the unit no longer had a mobilisation role it was disbanded, despite the protests of the Orkney TF Association. The individual Orkney gunners were posted to other RGA units in the UK and overseas.

== Postwar ==
When the TF was reconstituted on 1 January 1920, there were attempts to revive the Orkney RGA. Major J.D. Shearer raised two companies, which were designated the Orkney Coast Brigade, RGA when the TF was reorganised as the Territorial Army (TA) in 1921. However, recruitment was poor and the brigade was officially disbanded in May 1922. The historian of the Orkney and Shetland Volunteers places the blame for this failure on the disheartening effect of the 1915 decision to disband the former Orkney RGA.

== Successor units ==
In 1926 it was decided that the coastal defences of Great Britain should be solely manned by part-time soldiers of the TA. However, there were by now no TA units existing in Orkney or Shetland, and new ones had to be hastily raised after the Munich Crisis in 1938. On the outbreak of World War II, the fixed coast defences on Orkney, including those protecting Scapa Flow, were manned by a new Orkney Heavy Regiment (TA) formed on 1 November 1938 (Note: One source suggests that the Orkney Coast Brigade reformed in 1920 was placed in suspended animation in 1922 and was revived in 1938; however other sources state that it was disbanded and that the Orkney Hvy Rgt was a new unit.)

== Uniforms and insignia ==
The original uniform of the 1st Orkney AVC was a blue Frock coat with blue cuffs and collar, with five rows of black lace across the chest. Other ranks had scarlet piping round the collar and Austrian knots above the cuffs, officers had them in silver. The headgear was a blue peaked cap with a black band and scarlet piping, with the Royal Arms badge. White waist belts were worn, later replaced by cheaper black leather . However, in 1863 the 1st Orkney AVC adopted the standard uniform of the Royal Artillery. The Home Service helmet was worn from 1880.

== Commanding officers ==
The following served as commanding officer of the 1st Orkney Artillery Volunteers and Orkney RGA:

- Lt-Col David Balfour, appointed 15 March 1867
- Brevet Colonel Fred W. Burroughs, formerly of the 93rd Highlanders, appointed 1 November 1873
- Lt-Col J.W. Balfour, VD, formerly Captain, 7th Dragoon Guards, appointed 9 October 1880
- Lt-Col Richard Bailey, formerly Captain, RA, and adjutant of the 1st OAV, appointed 19 January 1898
- Lt-Col Thomas S. Peace, VD, appointed 28 March 1906
- Lt-Col J. Slater, VD, appointed 29 July 1911
