= Duke of Edinburgh's Own Edinburgh Artillery =

Auxiliary unit of the British Army

Duke of Edinburgh's Own Edinburgh Artillery 3rd Brigade, Scottish Division, RA Duke of Edinburgh's Own Edinburgh Artillery (Southern Division) RA Duke of Edinburgh's Own Edinburgh Artillery RGA (M)
- Active: November 1854–30 October 1909
- Country: United Kingdom
- Branch: Militia
- Role: Garrison Artillery
- Part of: Scottish Division, RA (1882–89); Southern Division, RA (1889–1902)
- Garrison/HQ: Edinburgh
- Engagements: Second Boer War

Commanders
- Colonel of the Regiment: Alfred, Duke of Edinburgh

The Duke of Edinburgh's Own Edinburgh Artillery was a part-time reserve unit of Britain's Royal Artillery based in Edinburgh from 1853 to 1909. Volunteers from the unit served in the Second Boer War.

== Background ==
The long-standing national Militia of the United Kingdom was revived by the Militia Act 1852, enacted during a period of international tension. As before, units were raised and administered on a county basis, and filled by voluntary enlistment (although conscription by means of the Militia Ballot might be used if the counties failed to meet their quotas). Training was for 56 days on enlistment, then for 21–28 days per year, during which the men received full army pay. Under the Act, Militia units could be embodied by Royal Proclamation for full-time service in three circumstances:

1. 'Whenever a state of war exists between Her Majesty and any foreign power'.
2. 'In all cases of invasion or upon imminent danger thereof'.
3. 'In all cases of rebellion or insurrection'.

The 1852 Act introduced Militia Artillery units in addition to the traditional infantry regiments. Their role was to man coastal defences and fortifications, relieving the Royal Artillery (RA) for active service.

== History ==
The unit was raised in Edinburgh in November 1854 under the title of Edinburgh Artillery Militia. The first commandant was Lieutenant-Colonel William Geddes, CB, (1794–1879) a retired officer of the East India Company's Bengal Horse Artillery, who was given the honorary rank of colonel. Geddes had seen a great deal of service in India, including the Nepal War, Third Mahratta War, Gwalior campaign and First Anglo-Sikh War. Octavius Pelly, a Half-pay Captain in the Madras Light Cavalry was appointed Major-Commandant on 28 October 1865 and promoted to Lt-Col on 26 March 1872.

In June 1874, Queen Victoria's second son, Alfred, Duke of Edinburgh, was appointed Honorary Colonel of the unit, and on 7 December 1875 the Queen approved the change of title to Duke of Edinburgh's Own Edinburgh Artillery Militia. The duke's insignia were included in the unit's badge.

The Artillery Militia was reorganised into 11 divisions of garrison artillery in 1882, and the Edinburgh unit joined the Scottish Division, taking the title of 3rd Brigade, Scottish Division, RA. When the Scottish Division was abolished in 1889 its militia were transferred to the Southern Division and the unit's title was altered to Duke of Edinburgh's Own Edinburgh Artillery (Southern Division) RA. Lieutenant-Colonel Alan Colquhoun, a former officer in the Black Watch and the 16th Lancers, was appointed commandant on 20 August 1887.

From 1899 the Militia artillery formally became part of the Royal Garrison Artillery (RGA), and when the RGA abolished the divisional structure the Edinburgh unit took the title of Duke of Edinburgh's Own Edinburgh RGA (M) on 1 January 1902.

== Embodiments ==
The unit was embodied for home defence three times:

- Crimean War: 2 February 1855 to 26 May 1856
- Indian Mutiny: 4 April 1859 to August 1860. The unit was embodied at Edinburgh and later moved to Dunbar
- Second Boer War: 7 May to 6 October 1900

== South Africa ==
Under the Militia Acts, units could also volunteer for overseas service. The Duke of Edinburgh's Artillery did so in 1900, and was one of the six Militia Artillery units permitted to form a Service Company of volunteers to serve in South Africa alongside the Regulars.

The company, under the command of Major J.E. Lee and consisting of five officers and 154 other ranks, embarked for South Africa on 23 March 1900 and landed at Durban on 1 May. On arrival they were combined with the service company of the Durham Artillery Militia, the composite unit being designated the Durham & Edinburgh Division RGA, under the command of Lt-Col H.P. Ditmas of the Durham Artillery.

While camped at Durban the Duke of Edinburgh's provided a guard of two officers and 100 men for the prison ship SS Catalonia, as well as men for the town guard and escort duties. On 2 December the company moved to the 'Tin Town' camp at Ladysmith where they guarded a Prisoner-of-war camp, manned the outposts of the Ladysmith defences, and sent detachments to Van Reenan's, Blan Blank, Acton Homes and Harrismith as required. The company manned and two Maxim guns and two Howitzers, one at Rifleman's Post under the command of Major Lee, and one at King's Post under Captain W.H. Thornhill. Thornhill commanded a composite company of Mounted infantry, which for two months provided the guards for all bridges and blockhouses from Colenso to Sandy's River on the Natal railway. On 9 September 1901 the brigade moved to Kakkerstroom to collect a thousand Boer prisoners of war and escort them to Durban and thence by sea to Bombay, where the company remained to guard them until sailing for home in November 1901.

The Duke of Edinburgh's lost three gunners who died of disease during the campaign. Major Lee, Captain (later Major) Thornhill (twice), and Corporal J. Dempsey were Mentioned in dispatches.

== Disbandment ==
After the Boer War, the future of the Militia was called into question. There were moves to reform the Auxiliary Forces (Militia, Yeomanry and Volunteers) to take their place in the six Army Corps proposed by St John Brodrick as Secretary of State for War. Some batteries of Militia Artillery were to be converted to field artillery. However, little of Brodrick's scheme was carried out.

Under the sweeping Haldane Reforms of 1908, the Militia was replaced by the Special Reserve, a semi-professional force whose role was to provide reinforcement drafts for Regular units serving overseas in wartime. The majority of the officers and men of the Duke of Edinburgh's RGA (M) accepted transfer to the Special Reserve Royal Field Artillery, and the unit was to become the Duke of Edinburgh's Own Edinburgh Royal Field Reserve Artillery. However all these units were scrapped in 1909, the Edinburgh unit disbanding on 30 October 1909. Instead the men of the RFA Special Reserve would form Brigade Ammunition Columns for the Regular RFA brigades on the outbreak of war.

== Honorary Colonels ==
The following served as Honorary Colonel of the unit:

- Admiral Alfred, Duke of Edinburgh, later Duke of Saxe-Coburg and Gotha, (1844–1900) appointed 24 June 1874
- Lt-Col Sir Alan Colquhoun of Luss, 6th Baronet, KCB, (1838–1910) former commandant, appointed 31 October 1903

== Notes ==
- Burke's Peerage, Baronetage and Knightage, 100th Edn, London, 1953.
- Col John K. Dunlop, The Development of the British Army 1899–1914, London: Methuen, 1938.
- Brig-Gen Sir James E. Edmonds, History of the Great War: Military Operations, France and Belgium, 1914, Vol I, 3rd Edn, London: Macmillan,1933/Woking: Shearer, 1986, ISBN 0-946998-01-9.
- J.B.M. Frederick, Lineage Book of British Land Forces 1660–1978, Vol II, Wakefield: Microform Academic, 1984, ISBN 1-85117-009-X.
- Lt-Col James Moncrieff Grierson (Col Peter S. Walton, ed.), Scarlet into Khaki: The British Army on the Eve of the Boer War, London: Sampson Low, 1899/London: Greenhill, 1988, ISBN 0-947898-81-6.
- Col George Jackson Hay An Epitomized History of the Militia (The Constitutional Force), London: United Service Gazette, 1905.

Republished by Ray Westlake Military Books, 1987, ISBN 978-0-9508530-7-9
Republished by Uckfield: Naval & Military Press, 2015, ISBN 978-1-78331-171-2

- Maj V.C.P, Hodson, Officers of the Bengal Army 1758–1834, 6 Vols, 1927/Uckfield: Naval & Military Press, 2001, ISBN 978-1-84342-186-3.
- Norman E.H. Litchfield, The Militia Artillery 1852–1909 (Their Lineage, Uniforms and Badges), Nottingham: Sherwood Press, 1987, ISBN 0-9508205-1-2.
- Edward M. Spiers, The Army and Society 1815–1914, London: Longmans, 1980, ISBN 0-582-48565-7.
- Edward M. Spiers, The Late Victorian Army 1868–1902, Manchester: Manchester University Press, 1992/Sandpiper Books, 1999, ISBN 0-7190-2659-8.
