= Southern Division, Royal Artillery =

Southern Division, RA
- Cap Badge of the Royal Regiment of Artillery
- Active: 4 April 1882–31 December 1901
- Country: United Kingdom
- Branch: British Army
- Type: Administrative division
- Part of: Royal Artillery
- Garrison/HQ: Portsmouth

The Southern Division, Royal Artillery, was an administrative grouping of garrison units of the Royal Artillery, Artillery Militia and Artillery Volunteers within the British Army's Southern District from 1882 to 1902.

== Organisation ==
Under General Order 72 of 4 April 1882 the Royal Artillery (RA) broke up its existing administrative brigades (Note: In RA terminology, a 'brigade' was a group of independent batteries grouped together for administrative rather than tactical purposes, the officer in command being usually a lieutenant-colonel rather than a brigadier-general or major-general, the ranks usually associated with command of an infantry or cavalry brigade.) of garrison artillery (7th–11th Brigades, RA) and assigned the individual batteries to 11 new territorial divisions. These divisions were purely administrative and recruiting organisations, not field formations. Most were formed within the existing military districts into which the United Kingdom was divided, and for the first time associated the part-time Artillery Militia with the regulars. Shortly afterwards the Artillery Volunteers were also added to the territorial divisions. The Regular Army batteries were grouped into one brigade, usually of nine sequentially-numbered batteries and a depot battery. For these units the divisions represented recruiting districts – batteries could be serving anywhere in the British Empire and their only connection to brigade headquarters (HQ) was for the supply of drafts and recruits. The artillery militia units (sometimes referred to as regiments) already comprised a number of batteries, and were redesignated as brigades, losing their county titles in the process. The artillery volunteers, which had previously consisted of numerous independent Artillery Volunteer Corps (AVC) of various sizes, sometimes grouped into administrative brigades, had been consolidated into larger AVCs in 1881, which were now affiliated to the appropriate territorial division.

== Composition 1882–89 ==
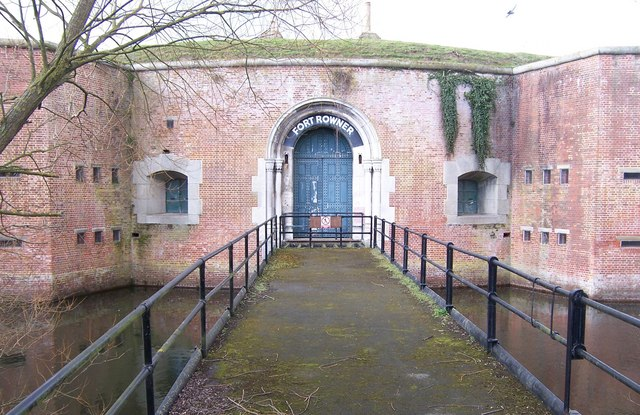
Entrance to Fort Rowner, HQ of 1st Brigade.

Southern Division, RA, listed sixth in order of precedence, was organised within Southern District with the following composition:

- Headquarters (HQ) at Portsmouth
- 1st Brigade
  - HQ at Fort Rowner, Gosport
  - 1st Bty at Malta – formerly 10th Bty, 10th Bde
  - 2nd Bty at Portsmouth – formerly 14th Bty, 15th Bde
  - 3rd Bty at Portsmouth – formerly 20th Bty, 10th Bde
  - 4th Bty at Golden Hill Fort, Isle of Wight – formerly 12th Bty, 8th Bde
  - 5th Bty at Agra– formerly 8th Bty, 11th Bde
  - 6th Bty at Allahabad – formerly 6th Bty, 11th Bde
  - 7th Bty at Campbellpore – formerly 10th Bty, 11th Bde
  - 8th Bty at Hong Kong – formerly 14th Bty, 7th Bde
  - 9th Bty at Singapore – formerly 9th Bty, 7th Bde
  - 10th Bty – new Bty formed 1887
  - Depot Bty – formerly Depot Bty, 7th Bde
- 2nd Brigade at Gosport – formerly Hampshire Militia Artillery (6 btys)
- 3rd Brigade at Newport, Isle of Wight– formerly Isle of Wight Artillery Militia (4 btys)
- 1st Hampshire Artillery Volunteers at Portsmouth

== Reorganisation 1889–1902 ==
In 1889 the garrison artillery was reorganised again into three large territorial divisions of garrison artillery and one of mountain artillery. The names of the divisions seemed arbitrary, with the Scottish units being grouped in the Southern Division, for example, but this related to where the need for coastal artillery was greatest, rather than where the units recruited. The artillery militia units regained their county designations. From 1 August 1891 garrison artillery batteries were termed companies, and some were grouped into double companies at this time before reverting to their previous numbers in March 1894.

- HQ at Portsmouth

=== Regulars ===
- 1st Co at Portsmouth – formerly 5th North Irish Bty; became 86th Co, RGA
- 2nd Co at Weymouth – formerly 8th North Irish Bty; became 62nd Co, RGA
- 3rd Co at Bombay – formerly 4th North Irish Bty; became 7th Co, RGA
- 4th Co at Mauritius – formerly 8th Western Bty; became 95th Co, RGA
- 5th Co at Aden – formerly 4th South Irish Bty; became 41st Co, RGA
- 6th Co at Malta – formerly 3rd North Irish Bty; became 51st Co, RGA
- 7th Co at Allahabad – formerly 1st Scottish Bty; became 14th Co, RGA
- 8th Co at Cape Town – formerly 2nd Southern Bty; transferred as 24th Western Co 1894
- 8th Co – reformed 1894, formerly 38th Southern Co; became 58th Co, RGA
- 9th Co at Delhi – formerly 8th Scottish Bty; became 42nd Co, RGA
- 10th Co at Hong Kong – formerly 7th Western Bty; became 93rd Co, RGA
- 11th Co at Bombay – formerly 2nd Northern Bty; became 35th Co, RGA
- 12th Co at Malta – formerly 4th Southern Bty; became 48th Co, RGA
- 13th Co at Singapore – formerly 9th Western Bty; became 94th Co, RGA
- 14th Co at Hong Kong – formerly 5th Eastern Bty; became 97th Co, RGA
- 15th Co at Portsmouth – formerly 5th Southern Bty; 15th (Siege Train) Co 1892; became 91st Co, RGA
- 16th Co at Portsmouth – formerly 6th Scottish Bty; 16A Co 1891–94; became 57th Co, RGA
- 17th Co at Spike Island, County Cork – formerly 9th South Irish Bty; became 78th Co, RGA
- 18th Co at Karachi – formerly 1st South Irish Bty; became 29th Co, RGA
- 19th Co at Portsmouth – formerly 7th North Irish Bty; 10A Co 1891–94; became79th Co, RGA
- 20th Co at Rangoon – formerly 4th Lancashire Bty; 20th (Siege Train) Co 1898; became 1st Co, RGA
- 21st Co at Barrackpore – formerly 6th Cinque Ports Bty; became 21st Co, RGA
- 22nd Co at Spike Island – formerly 7th Lancashire Bty; 2A Co 1891-94; became 63rd Co, RGA
- 23rd Co at Golden Hill Fort, Isle of Wight – formerly 7th North Irish Bty; transferred as 25th Western Co 1891
- 23rd Co – reformed 1894, formerly 40th Southern Co; became 69th Co, RGA
- 24th Co at Campbellpore – formerly 7th Scottish Bty; 22nd Co 1891–94; 24th (Heavy) Co 1896; became 43rd Co, RGA
- 25th Co at Malta – formerly 4th Scottish Bty; 6A Co 1891–94; became 49th Co, RGA
- 26th Co at Singapore – formerly 4th Western Bty; became 33rd Co, RGA
- 27th Co at Golden Hill Fort – formerly 5th Lancashire Bty; 1A Co 1891–94; became 88th Co, RGA
- 28th Co at Roorkee – formerly 3rd Scottish Bty; 24th Co 1891–94; became 22nd Co, RGA
- 29th Co at Cape Town – formerly 1st Lancashire Bty; amalgamated with 8th Co 1891; became 86th Co, RGA
- 29th Co reformed 1894; became 61st Co, RGA
- 30th Co at Hong Kong – formerly 1st Southern Bty; 25th Co 1891–94; became 15th Co, RGA
- 31st Co at Portsmouth – formerly 6th Southern Bty; 13A Co 1891–94; became 87th Co, RGA
- 32nd Co at Singapore – formerly 6th Eastern Bty; 15A Co 1891–94; became 96th Co, RGA
- 33rd Co at Ceylon – formerly 8th Southern Bty; 4A Co 1891; disbanded 1894
- 33rd Co reformed 1894 – formerly 11th Eastern Co; became 75th Co, RGA
- 34th Co at Portsmouth – formerly 7th Southern Bty; 17A Co 1891–94; became 89th Co, RGA
- 35th Co at Malta – formerly 9th Lancashire Bty; 12A Co 1891–94; became 55th Co, RGA
- 36th Co at Malta – formerly 9th London Bty; 27th Co 1891–94; became 56th Co, RGA
- 37th Co at Malta – formerly 9th Welsh Bty; 27A Co 1891; disbanded 1894
- 38th Co at Spike Island – formerly 10th Norther Bty; 25A Co 1891; 8th Co 1894
- 39th Co at Weymouth – formerly 10th Lancashire Bty; 114 A Co 1891; disbanded 1894
- 39th Co reformed 1895 – formerly 2 Sub-Depot; became 4th Co, RGA
- 40th Co at Sandown, Isle of Wight – formerly 10th Eastern Bty; 18th Co 1891; 23rd Co 1894
- 41st Co at Fort Grange, Gosport – formerly 10th Cinque Ports Bty; 26 A Co 1891; disbanded 1894
- 42nd Co at Portsmouth – formerly 10th Southern Bty; 28A Co 1891; disbanded 1894
- 42nd Co reformed 1901 – formerly Sierra Leone Detachment; became 105th Co, RGA
- Depot Co at Fort Rowner, Gosport – formerly Southern Depot Bty; 1st Depot Co 1895; became No 2 Depot Co, RGA
  - 1st Sub-Depot at Liverpool – formerly Lancashire Depot Bty; 2nd Depot Co 1895; became No 4 Depot Co, RGA
  - 2nd Sub-Depot at Leith – formerly Scottish Depot Bty; to 39th Co 1895
  - 3rd Sub-Depot at Spike Island

=== Militia ===
- Antrim Artillery (Southern Division) at Carrickfergus (8 Btys)
- Haddington Artillery (Southern Division) at Dunbar (6 Btys)
- Cork City Artillery (Southern Division) at Cork (4 Btys)
- West Cork Artillery (Southern Division) at Fort Westmorland, Spike Island (6 Btys) – absorbed into Cork City in 1890
- Donegal Artillery (Southern Division) at Letterkenny (8 Btys)
- Dublin City Artillery (Southern Division)] at Dublin (4 Btys)
- Duke of Edinburgh's Own Edinburgh Artillery (Southern Division) at Edinburgh (6 Btys)
- Fife Artillery (Southern Division) at Cupar (6 Btys)
- Forfar & Kincardine Artillery (Southern Division) at Montrose (8 Btys)
- Hampshire Artillery (Southern Division) (5 Btys)
- Duke of Connaught's Own Isle of Wight Artillery (Southern Division) at Sandown (4 Btys)
- Lancashire Artillery (Southern Division) at Seaforth (6 Btys)
- Limerick City Artillery (Southern Division) at Limerick (6 Btys)
- Mid-Ulster Artillery (Southern Division) at Dungannon (5 Btys)
- Tipperary Artillery (Southern Division) at Clonmel (6 Btys)
- Waterford Artillery (Southern Division) at Waterford (5 Btys)
- Argyll & Bute Artillery (Southern Division) at Campbeltown (6 Btys)
- Wicklow Artillery (Southern Division) at Wicklow (6 Btys)
- Duke of Connaught's Own Sligo Artillery (Southern Division) (4 Btys)
- Londonderry Artillery (Southern Division) at Derry (6 Btys)
- Clare Artillery (Southern Division) at Ennis (5 Btys)

=== Volunteers ===
- 1st Hampshire Artillery Volunteers at Portsmouth
- 2nd Hampshire Artillery Volunteers at Southsea
- 1st Edinburgh (City) Artillery Volunteers at Edinburgh
- 1st Midlothian Artillery Volunteers at Edinburgh
- 1st Banffshire (Aberdeen, Banff & Elgin) Artillery Volunteers at Banff
- 1st Forfarshire Artillery Volunteers at Dundee
- 1st Lancashire Artillery Volunteers at Liverpool
- 2nd Lancashire Artillery Volunteers at Liverpool
- 3rd Lancashire Artillery Volunteers at Blackburn
- 4th Lancashire Artillery Volunteers at Liverpool
- 5th Lancashire Artillery Volunteers at Preston
- 6th Lancashire Artillery Volunteers at Liverpool
- 7th Lancashire (The Manchester Artillery) Artillery Volunteers at Manchester
- 8th Lancashire Artillery Volunteers at Liverpool
- 9th Lancashire Artillery Volunteers at Bolton
- 1st Renfrew and Dumbarton Artillery Volunteers at Greenock
- 1st Dorsetshire Artillery Volunteers at Weymouth
- 2nd Dorsetshire Artillery Volunteers at Portland – independent 1891–94
- 1st Fifeshire (Fife & Stirling) Artillery Volunteers at St Andrews
- 1st Haddington Artillery Volunteers at Dunbar
- 1st Lanarkshire Artillery Volunteers at Glasgow
- 1st Ayrshire & Galloway (Ayr, Wigtown & Kirkcudbright) Artillery Volunteers at Kilmarnock
- 1st Argyll & Bute Artillery Volunteers at Rothesay
- 1st Cheshire & Carnarvonshire Artillery Volunteers at Chester
- 1st Caithness (Caithness & Sutherland) Artillery Volunteers at Thurso
- 1st Aberdeenshire (Aberdeen & Kincardineshire) Artillery Volunteers at Aberdeen
- 1st Berwickshire Artillery Volunteers at Eyemouth
- 1st Inverness-shire (inverness, Cromarty, Nairn, Ross & Elgin) Artillery Volunteers at Inverness
- 1st Cumberland Artillery Volunteers at Carlisle
- 1st Orkney Artillery Volunteers at Kirkwall
- 1st Shropshire & Staffordshire Artillery Volunteers at Stoke-on-Trent
- 1st Worcestershire (Worcester & Monmouth) Artillery Volunteers at Worcester

== Disbandment ==
In 1899 the Royal Artillery was divided into two distinct branches, field and garrison. The field branch included the Royal Horse Artillery (RHA) and the newly-named Royal Field Artillery (RFA). The garrison branch was named the Royal Garrison Artillery (RGA) and included coast defence, position, heavy, siege and mountain artillery. The division became Southern Division, RGA. The RGA retained the divisions until they were scrapped on 1 January 1902, at which point the Regular RGA companies were numbered in a single sequence and the militia and volunteer units were designated '--- shire RGA (M)' or '(V)' as appropriate.

== See also ==
- Royal Garrison Artillery
- List of Royal Artillery Divisions 1882–1902
- Eastern Division, Royal Artillery
- Western Division, Royal Artillery
