= Ardhallow Battery =

Palmerston fort in Argyll and Bute, Scotland

- Dunoon, Argyll and Bute in Scotland, United Kingdom

Site information
- Type: Palmerston Fort

Location
- Coordinates: 55.9258°N 4.9422°W, National grid reference NS 16260 74140

Site history
- Built by: The Aitkenhead Builders

Garrison information
- Designations: Scheduled Monument: SM13683

Ardhallow Battery is a Palmerston Fort on the slopes of Corlarach Hill around 2 miles (3.2 km) south of Dunoon in the west of Scotland. Part of the local Clyde Defenses and the Scottish Coastal Defences. The construction contract was awarded to "The Aitkenhead Builders" in 1901 for a price of £16,000. The Battery is a scheduled monument. The site was used in both World Wars and decommissioned in 1956.

There was also the Dunoon Battery located atop Castle Hill in Dunoon. There was a battery on the east shore, the Cloch Point Battery, which was located on the slope above the Cloch Lighthouse. Enhanced and expanded for defence during the Second World War. It is also a scheduled monument. The site is now occupied by the Cloch Caravan Park.

During both World Wars, a defensive boom, known as the Cloch Point to Dunoon Anti-Submarine Boom, was in place. Remains of the boom anchor points are also scheduled.

These installations were built to protect the upper Firth of Clyde shipping and the numerous shipyards located on the lower reaches of the River Clyde.

== See also ==
- Coastal fortifications in Scotland
