= Downing Point Battery =

WWI gun battery in Fife, Scotland

- Part of British coastal defence WW1
- Firth of Forth; Near Dalgety Bay in Scotland, United Kingdom
- Original plan of the Downing Point Battery and outer defences (1916)

Site information
- Controlled by: Forth Royal Garrison Artillery, Royal Engineers
- Condition: Derelict

Location
- Coordinates: 56.02763°N 3.35317°W

Site history
- Built: 1914
- In use: 1914-1918
- Materials: Steel-reinforced concrete
- Fate: Decommissioned

Scheduled monument
- Official name: Downing Point, battery and camp
- Type: 20th Century Military and Related: Battery; Camp
- Designated: 20 March 2018
- Reference no.: SM13685

The Downing Point Battery was a World War I coastal gun battery defending the Firth of Forth. The battery was constructed in 1914 at Downing Point, then part of the Earl of Moray's Donibristle Estate. The site is now within the new town of Dalgety Bay in Fife.

== Forth defence lines ==
In the First World War three lines of defence were established on the Firth of Forth to protect Rosyth Naval Dockyard, then home to the Battle Cruiser Fleet. These lines of defence were known as the Outer, Middle and Inner Defence Lines.

War Office chart showing the three Forth Defence Lines in WW1

The Outer Line ran from a gun battery at Kinghorn to a battery at Leith Docks, with fortified gun emplacements on the island of Inchkeith.

The Middle Line ran from Braefoot Battery in the North to a battery on Cramond Island in the South, with fortified gun emplacements on the islands of Inchcolm and Inchmickery.

The Inner Line was situated close to the Forth Bridge, with batteries at Downing Point on the North coast and Hound Point on the South coast of the firth. Additional batteries were located at Carlingnose Point, Dalmeny, and on the island of Inchgarvie. Each line of defence also had an associated anti-submarine boom.

== Battery specification ==
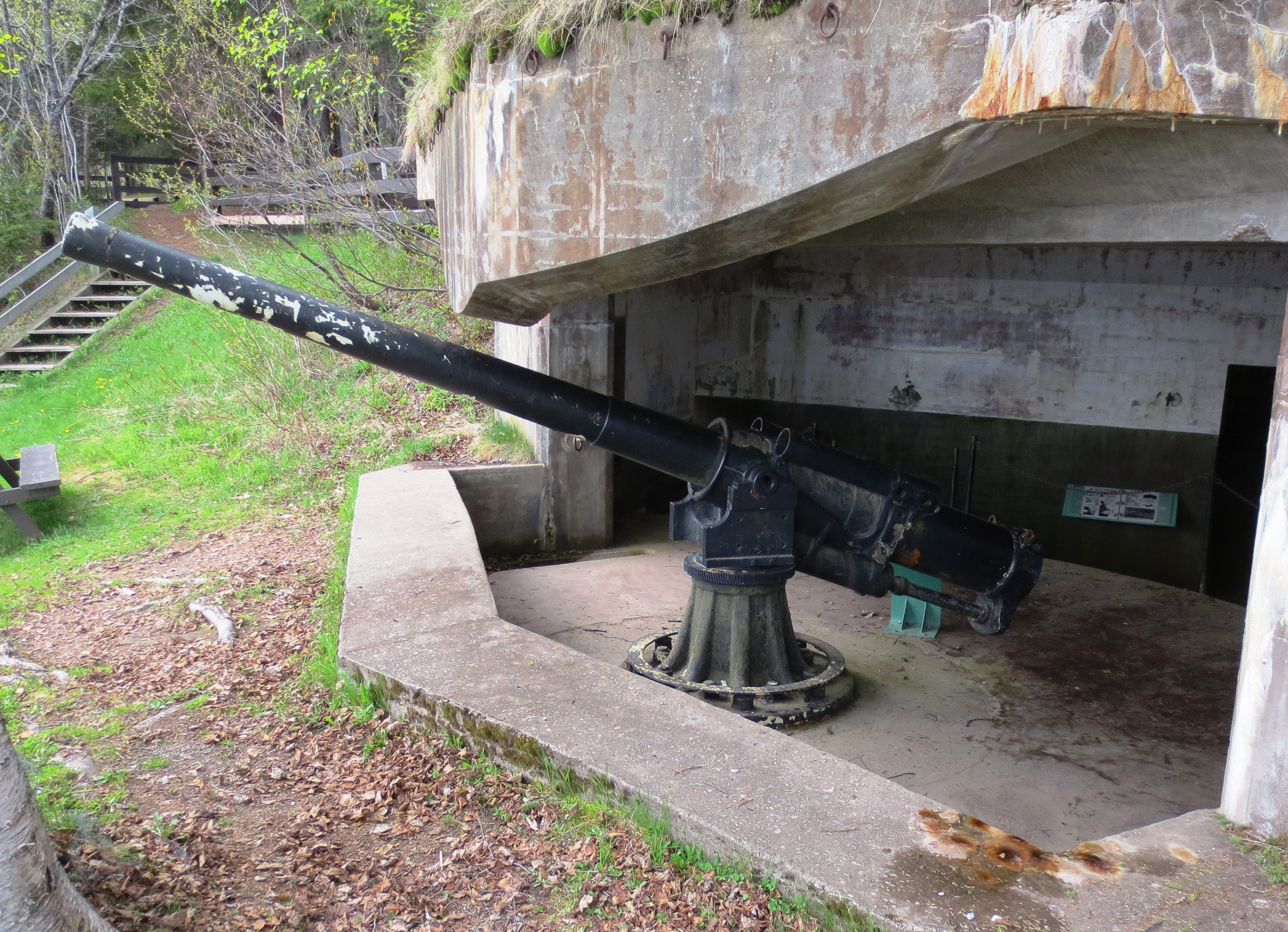
A QF 4.7-inch gun at Fort Peninsula, Quebec, the type of gun initially mounted at Downing Point

The Downing Point Battery incorporated two gun emplacements, each was initially equipped with a QF 4.7-inch Mk I – IV naval gun, designed to engage enemy surface vessels threatening ships at anchor in the Firth of Forth and the naval facilities at Rosyth Dockyard. Each 4.7 inch gun could fire a shell weighing 20 kg out to range of 11 km.

In June 1917 the two 4.7 inch guns were transferred to the battery on Inchcolm island and replaced with two QF 12-pounder 18 cwt naval guns taken from the island. These 12-pounder guns could fire a 5 kg shell out to a range of 8.5 km.

A thin promontory of rock runs to the East from gun emplacements, this promontory housed two Defence Electric Lights – powerful searchlights designed to illuminate targets for the guns at night. One DEL was of the kind where the light could be moved to follow a target; the other produced a fixed beam, illuminating an area of water on which the guns were already pre-ranged.

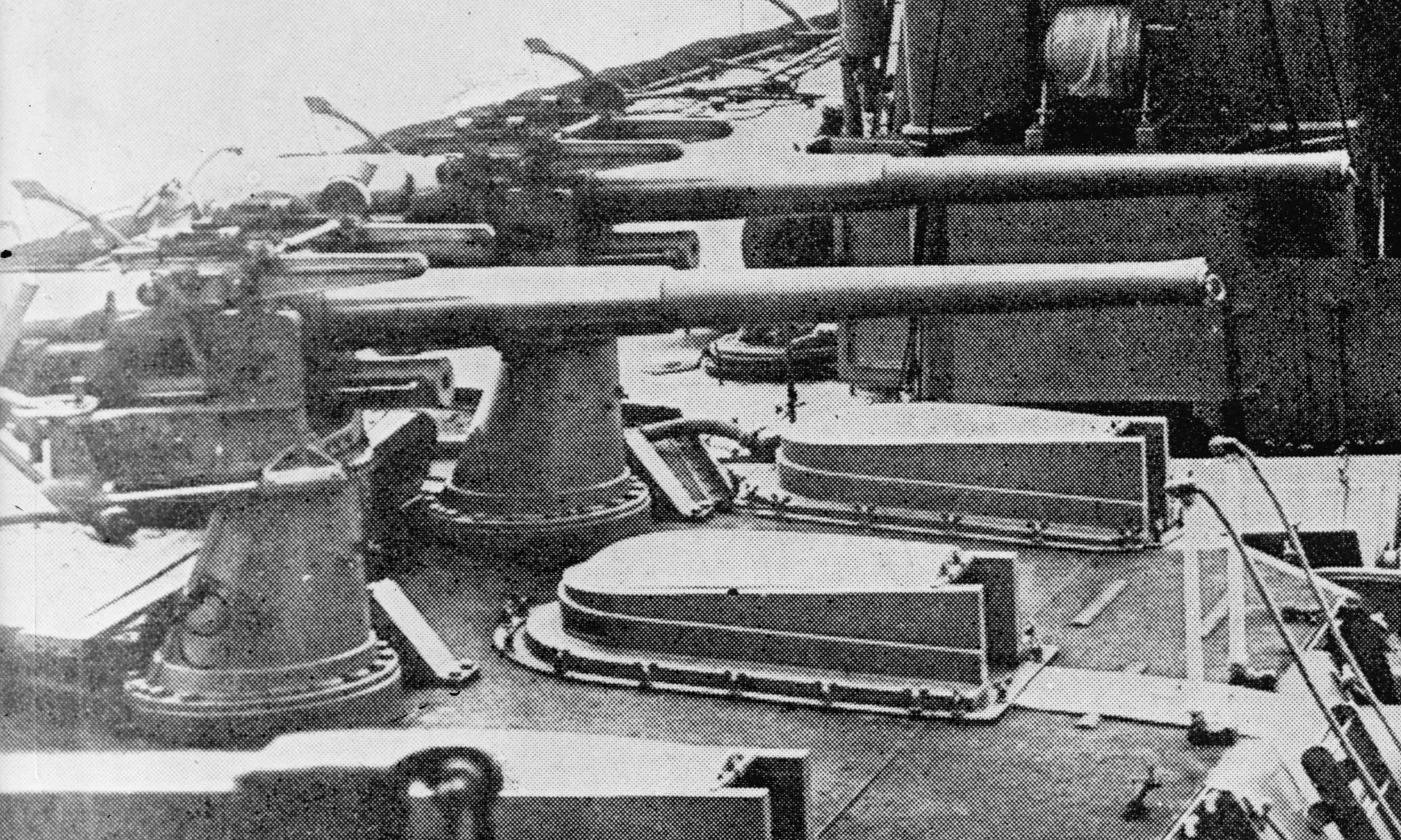
QF 12-pdr 18 cwt guns mounted on the Battleship HMS Dreadnought, the same type installed at Downing Point in 1917

War Office plan (1916) showing the design of Blockhouse No.5 as installed at Downing Point Battery

The battery was manned by men of the Forth Royal Garrison Artillery and Royal Engineers.

Downing Point Battery site plan dated 1916 showing the ring of defensive blockhouses, wire fence and barbed wire entanglements.

It was important to ensure that coast defence batteries were not put out of action by enemy troops landing and attacking them from the landward side. The Downing Point battery was surrounded by both a plain wire fence and a barbed wire entanglement that ran out onto the beach along the northern side. There were also four blockhouses within the perimeter.

The battery was further defended by an outer perimeter of six blockhouses positioned between 250 and 400m from the battery. The blockhouses were built of wood with pitched wood and felt roofs, internally there was a stove and bunks for 10 men. The blockhouses were made bulletproof with the addition of a sandbag wall placed approximately one metre away from the wooden structure.

== History ==
Authority to proceed with construction was given in September 1914 with a budget of £450. To equip the battery two 4.7 inch guns were transferred from the Kinghorn Battery and mounted at Downing Point in October 1914.

Later in the war the fleet anchorages moved East of the Forth Bridge and consequently the Outer and Middle Defence Lines were given priority and strengthened at the expense of the Inner Line. The 4.7 inch guns were transferred to the Inchcolm Battery in June 1917, with a pair of 12-pounder guns transferred from the island and installed at Downing Point.

== Current status ==
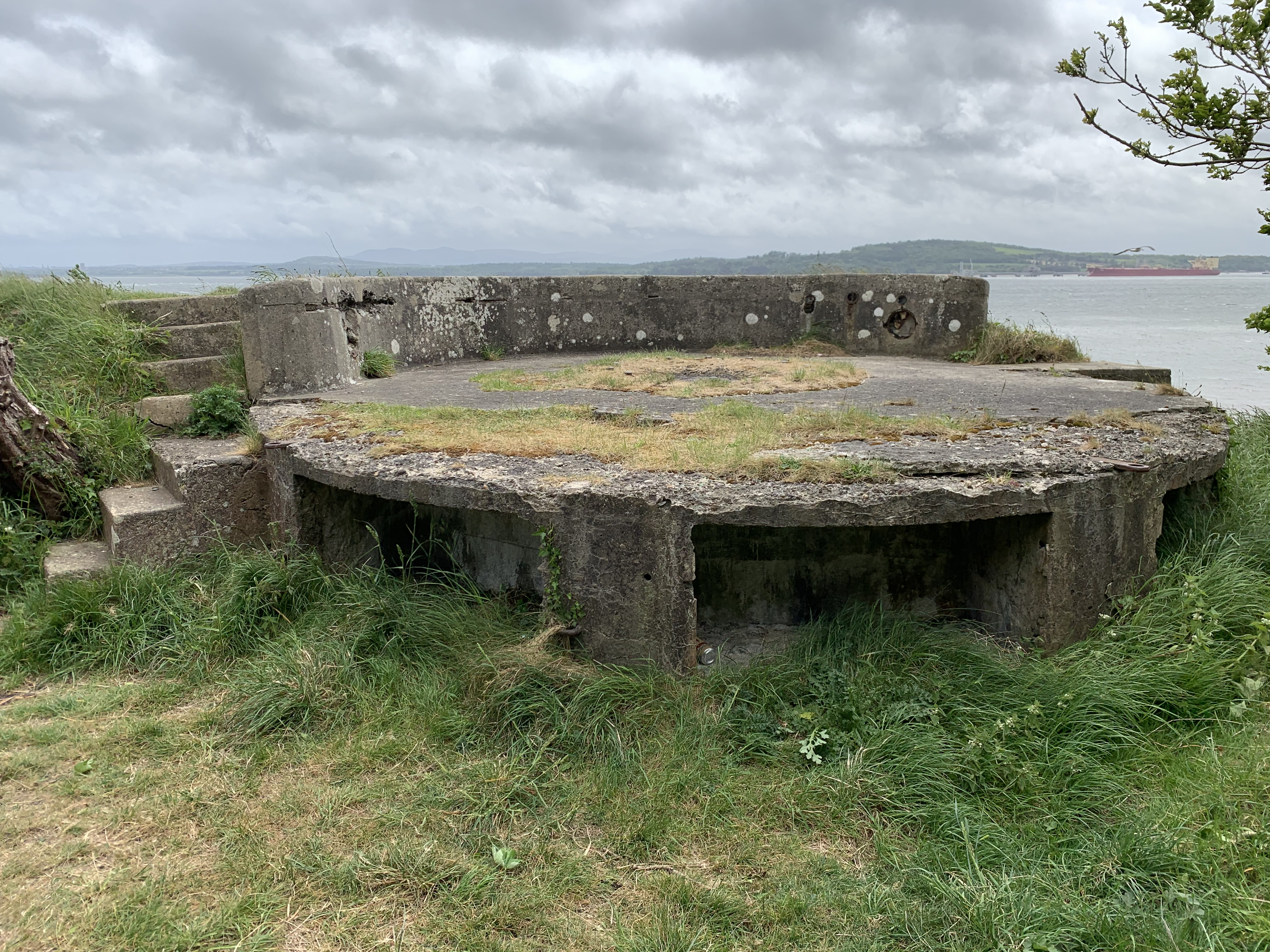
Remains of the Western gun emplacement at Downing Point overlooking the River Forth

Visitors today can still access the two concrete gun emplacements from the Downing Point Battery, which offer a commanding view over the River Forth. A range finder post is situated between the two gun emplacements but this is now partially collapsed.

Part of an information board erected by the Community Woodlands Group in Bathing House Wood which provides some history of the Downing Point Battery and a site layout map

The site can be accessed by the public via Bathing House Wood, on a trail that forms part of the Fife Coastal Path. The Dalgety Bay Community Woodlands Group maintain the surrounding woodland area and have erected an information board commemorating the battery site.

The majority of Battery buildings such as the barracks, magazine, engine room and defensive blockhouses are no longer present at the site. The surrounding area was developed in to residential housing during the 1960s. It is still possible to observe the exposed concrete bases of the magazine, generator house, and ablutions blocks to the north of the site.

== See also ==
- Coastal fortifications in Scotland
- Scheduled monuments in Fife
