= 1st Aberdeenshire Artillery Volunteers =

Military unit of Britain's Volunteer Force, later its Territorial Force

1st Aberdeenshire Artillery Volunteers 1st Highland Brigade, RFA 75th (Highland) Field Regiment, RA 275th (Highland) Regiment, RA
- Active: 1860–1967
- Country: United Kingdom
- Branch: Territorial Army
- Type: Artillery Regiment
- Role: Garrison Artillery; Field Artillery
- Part of: 51st (Highland) Division
- Garrison/HQ: Aberdeen
- Engagements: First World War: Western Front; Second World War: Battle of France; Operation Cycle; Alamein; Tunisia; Sicily; Operation Overlord; North West Europe; Rhine Crossing

The 1st Aberdeenshire Artillery Volunteers was a part-time unit of the British Army raised in Aberdeenshire and neighbouring counties in Scotland in 1860. Its successor units served with 51st (Highland) Division through many of the major battles on the Western Front during the First World War. In the Second World War, one of its regiments escaped the surrender of the 51st (Highland) Division in 1940 and went on to serve as heavy artillery in the Italian Campaign. The other regiment served with the reconstituted division at Alamein, in Sicily, Normandy and through North West Europe to the Rhine Crossing and beyond. It served on in the Territorial Army until 1967.

== Volunteer Force ==
The enthusiasm for the Volunteer movement following an invasion scare in 1859 saw the creation of many Rifle and Artillery Volunteer Corps composed of part-time soldiers eager to supplement the Regular British Army in time of need. Seven Artillery Volunteer Corps (AVCs) were formed in Aberdeenshire:

- 1st (Peterhead) Aberdeenshire AVC formed on 13 March 1860
- 2nd (Peterhead) Aberdeenshire AVC formed on 13 March 1860, shortly afterwards absorbed into 1st AVC as 2nd Battery and disbanded 1864
- 3rd (Aberdeen) Aberdeenshire AVC formed on 2 May 1860 as an artisans' battery raised from employees of the shipbuilders and ironfounders Thomson, Catto, Buchanan & Co, who contributed funds to the corps
- 4th (Town of Aberdeen) Aberdeenshire AVC formed on 14 April 1860 as a citizens' battery, the members clothing and equipping themselves
- 5th (Fraserburgh) Aberdeenshire AVC formed on 15 February 1860
- 6th (Aberdeen) Aberdeenshire AVC formed on 9 February 1860 as an artisans' battery raised from employees of the shipbuilders and ironfounders Blaikie Brothers
- 7th (Aberdeen) Aberdeenshire AVC formed on 23 September 1861, second battery raised 19 July 1865

On 24 October 1860, these units were brought together as the 1st Administrative Brigade, Aberdeenshire Artillery Volunteers based in the city of Aberdeen, to which Lieutenant-Colonel William Cosmo Gordon of Fyvie (former captain in the Madras Artillery) was appointed commanding officer (CO) on 21 May 1862.

In 1863, the AVCs raised in neighbouring Kincardineshire were also included in the 1st Aberdeenshire Administrative Brigade:

- 1st (Stonehaven) Kincardineshire AVC formed on 10 January 1860, absorbed 5th Kincardineshire AVC as 2nd Battery in 1861 and moved to Cowie
- 2nd (Johnshaven) Kincardineshire AVC formed on 14 August 1860
- 3rd (St Cyrus) Kincardineshire AVC formed on 30 July 1860
- 4th (Bervie) Kincardineshire AVC formed on 29 October 1860
- 5th (Cowie) Kincardineshire AVC formed mainly from fishermen on 29 January 1861, absorbed into 1st Kincardineshire AVC and disbanded 1875.

In 1874, the 3rd, 4th, 6th and 7th Aberdeen AVCs were combined into a new 3rd Aberdeenshire AVC of five companies (the 7th providing two companies), with a sixth added in September 1877 and a seventh in 1877–78. In 1876, the AVCs in North East Scotland were reorganised. The 2nd, 3rd and 4th Kincardineshire AVCs were transferred from the 1st Aberdeen to the 1st Forfarshire Administrative Brigade, and replaced by the units of the 1st Banffshire Administrative Brigade:

- 1st (Macduff) Banffshire AVC formed before October 1859
- 2nd (Banff) Banffshire AVC formed on 29 December 1859
- 3rd (Gardenstown) Banffshire AVC formed on 13 November 1875
- 4th (Portsoy) Banffshire AVC formed on 8 October 1860
- 5th (Cullen) Banffshire AVC formed on 18 February 1861

The 1st Kincardineshire AVC at Cowie remained with the 1st Aberdeen.

In 1880, the Volunteer Force was consolidated into larger units. The 1st Aberdeenshire Administrative Brigade became the 1st Aberdeenshire AVC on 10 May 1880, with the subtitle 'Aberdeen, Banff and Kincardine'. The former 1st Kincardineshire battery at Cowie was disbanded at the end of 1880 and replaced by a new No 14 Battery raised at Aberdeen out of the 7th Battery. The three other Kincardine batteries returned to the 1st Aberdeen in May 1882 and the Banffshire batteries (including No 1 (Peterhead) and No 5 (Fraserburgh) Batteries) became an independent unit once more. The 1st Aberdeenshire then dropped the 'Banff' part of its subtitle and had the following organisation:

- Nos 1–7 Batteries at Aberdeen (former Nos 2–7 and 14 Companies)
- No 8 Battery at Johnshaven (former 2nd Kincardine AVC)
- No 9 Battery at Ct Cyrus (former 3rd Kincardine AVC)
- No 10 Battery at Bervie (former 4th Kincardine AVC)

In 1885, a new No 8 Battery was formed at the University of Aberdeen and Nos 8–10 Batteries were renumbered 9–11; a new No 12 Battery was formed at Stonehaven in December 1886.

=== Position Artillery ===
The AVCs were intended to serve as garrison artillery manning fixed defences, but a number of the early units were semi-mobile 'position batteries' of smooth-bore field guns pulled by agricultural horses. The War Office (WO) refused to pay for these batteries and they died out. However the concept was revived in 1888 when some Volunteer batteries were reorganised as position artillery to work alongside the Volunteer infantry brigades. On 17 January 1889, the 1st Aberdeenshire AVC was issued with a position battery of 40-pounder Rifled Breech-Loading guns, which were staffed by Nos 5 and 8 Batteries. On 1 November 1892, these were amalgamated as the 1st Position Battery and the remaining garrison batteries were redesignated companies (Nos 2–7 at Aberdeen, 8 at Johnshaven, 9 at St Cyrus, 10 at Bervie and 11 at Stonehaven). In 1893, the Johnshaven and St Cyrus companies merged and Nos 10 and 11 were renumbered. A 2nd Position Battery was raised on 1 April 1901 and No 2 Company was renumbered 8, with Nos 8–10 renumbered again.

=== Royal Garrison Artillery ===
In 1882, all the AVCs were affiliated to one of the territorial garrison divisions of the Royal Artillery (RA) and the 1st Aberdeenshire AVC became part of the Scottish Division. In 1889, the structure was altered, and the corps joined the Southern Division. In 1899, the RA was divided into separate field and garrison branches, and the artillery volunteers were all assigned to the Royal Garrison Artillery (RGA). When the divisional structure was abolished their titles were changed, the unit becoming the 1st Aberdeenshire Royal Garrison Artillery (Volunteers) on 1 January 1902. The position batteries were re-armed with 4.7-inch guns and redesignated as heavy batteries, giving the following organisation:

- 1st Heavy Battery (from 2nd Bty 7th Aberdeen AVC and University Bty)
- 2nd Heavy Battery (raised 1901)
- No 3 Garrison Company (from 4th (Citizens) Aberdeen AVC)
- No 4 Garrison Company (from 6th (Artisans) Aberdeen AVC)
- No 5 Garrison Company (from 1st Bty 7th Aberdeen AVC)
- No 6 Garrison Company (raised 1877)
- No 7 Garrison Company (raised 1880)
- No 8 Garrison Company (from 3rd (Artisans) Aberdeen AVC)
- No 9 Garrison Company at Johnshaven (from 2nd and 3rd Kincardine AVCs)
- No 10 Garrison Company at Bevie (from 4th Kincardine AVC)
- No 11 Garrison Company at Stonehaven (raised 1886)

In 1899, the unit built a new HQ and drill hall in North Silver Street, Aberdeen, with 5-inch and 6-inch guns for training the garrison companies. These companies carried out their live firing at Torry Point Battery, which had been rearmed with modern guns. For musketry training the unit used the Seaton Links Rifle Range belonging to the 1st Volunteer Battalion, Gordon Highlanders. Annual camp and training for the heavy batteries, was carried out at Buddon. In 1904, the garrison companies won the King's Cup at the Scottish National Artillery Association's camp at Buddon. During the Second Boer War, 13 volunteers from the 1st Aberdeenshire served with various units in South Africa.

== Territorial Force ==
When the Volunteers were subsumed into the new Territorial Force (TF) under the Haldane Reforms of 1908, the personnel of the 1st Aberdeenshire and 1st Banffshire RGA (V) were distributed to two new units:

- North Scottish RGA, a defended ports unit at Broughty Ferry, with additional batteries from the 1st Fife RGA (V), 1st Forfarshire RGA (V) and Highland RGA (V)
- I (or 1st) Highland Brigade, Royal Field Artillery (RFA), with one battery from the 1st Banffshire RGA, giving the following organisation:
- HQ at North Silver Street, Aberdeen
- 1st City of Aberdeen Battery
- 2nd City of Aberdeen Battery
- Banffshire Battery
- 1st Highland Ammunition Column (including Banffshire Small Arms Ammunition Section)

In 1911, the Banffshire battery was disbanded and replaced by a 3rd City of Aberdeen Battery.

The I Highland Brigade was the senior field artillery unit in the TF's Highland Division. The batteries were each issued with four 15-pounder guns.

== First World War ==
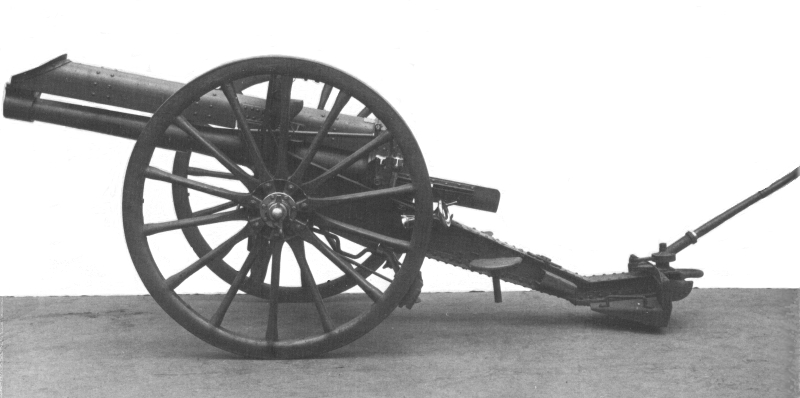
15-pounder gun issued to TF units.

=== Mobilisation ===
A warning order of the imminence of war was received at the Highland Division's HQ on 29 July 1914, and the order to mobilise was received at 17.35 on Tuesday, 4 August 1914. Mobilisation began the following day at unit drill halls. On 12 August, the division was ordered to concentrate at Bedford and entrainment began on 15 August. Concentration was completed by 17 August and the division formed part of First Army (Home Forces) in Central Force.

On the outbreak of war, units of the Territorial Force were invited to volunteer for Overseas Service: the majority of men in every unit of the Highland Division did so. On 15 August, the WO issued instructions to separate those men who had signed up for Home Service only, and form these into reserve units. Then, on 31 August, the formation of a reserve or 2nd Line unit was authorised for each 1st Line unit where 60 per cent or more of the men had volunteered for Overseas Service. The titles of these 2nd Line units would be the same as the original, but distinguished by a '2/' prefix. In this way, duplicate batteries, brigades and divisions were created, mirroring those TF formations being sent overseas.

=== 1/I Highland Brigade ===
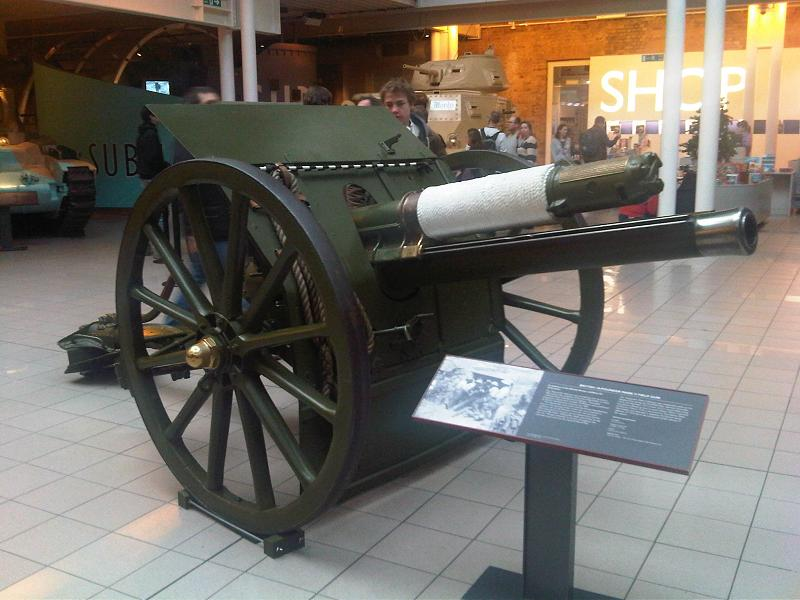
18-pounder field gun preserved at the Imperial War Museum.

During the winter of 1914–15, the 1st Line units underwent war training, and a number left to join the British Expeditionary Force (BEF) on the Western Front. The division was warned for overseas service on 13 April and on 3 May it crossed to France, the artillery embarking at Southampton for Le Havre. The Highland Division completed its concentration at Lillers, Busnes and Robecq by 6 May and on 12 May it was officially numbered as the 51st (Highland) Division.

==== Western Front ====
The raw division was soon in action at the Battle of Festubert (18–25 May). The 51st (Highland) and 1st Canadian Division together formed 'Alderson's Force', which relieved the attacking divisions at the end of the first day's fighting. It was also engaged at the Battle of Givenchy (15–16 June). Afterwards, the division was moved to a quiet front to gain more experience. 1/I Highland Bde's old 15-pounders were replaced with modern 18-pounder guns on 24 August.

On 14 April 1916, 1/I Highland Bde formed an additional battery (D Bty). Then on 15 May the TF brigades of the RFA received numbers, the 1/I Highland becoming CCLV (255) Brigade, and the old batteries were redesignated A, B and C. D Battery was then exchanged for 1/1st Renfrewshire (Howitzer) Bty from the CCLVIII (III Highland) Howitzer Bde, which became D (H) Bty, equipped with 4.5-inch howitzers. The brigade ammunition columns were abolished at the same time, and absorbed within the divisional ammunition column.

==== Somme ====
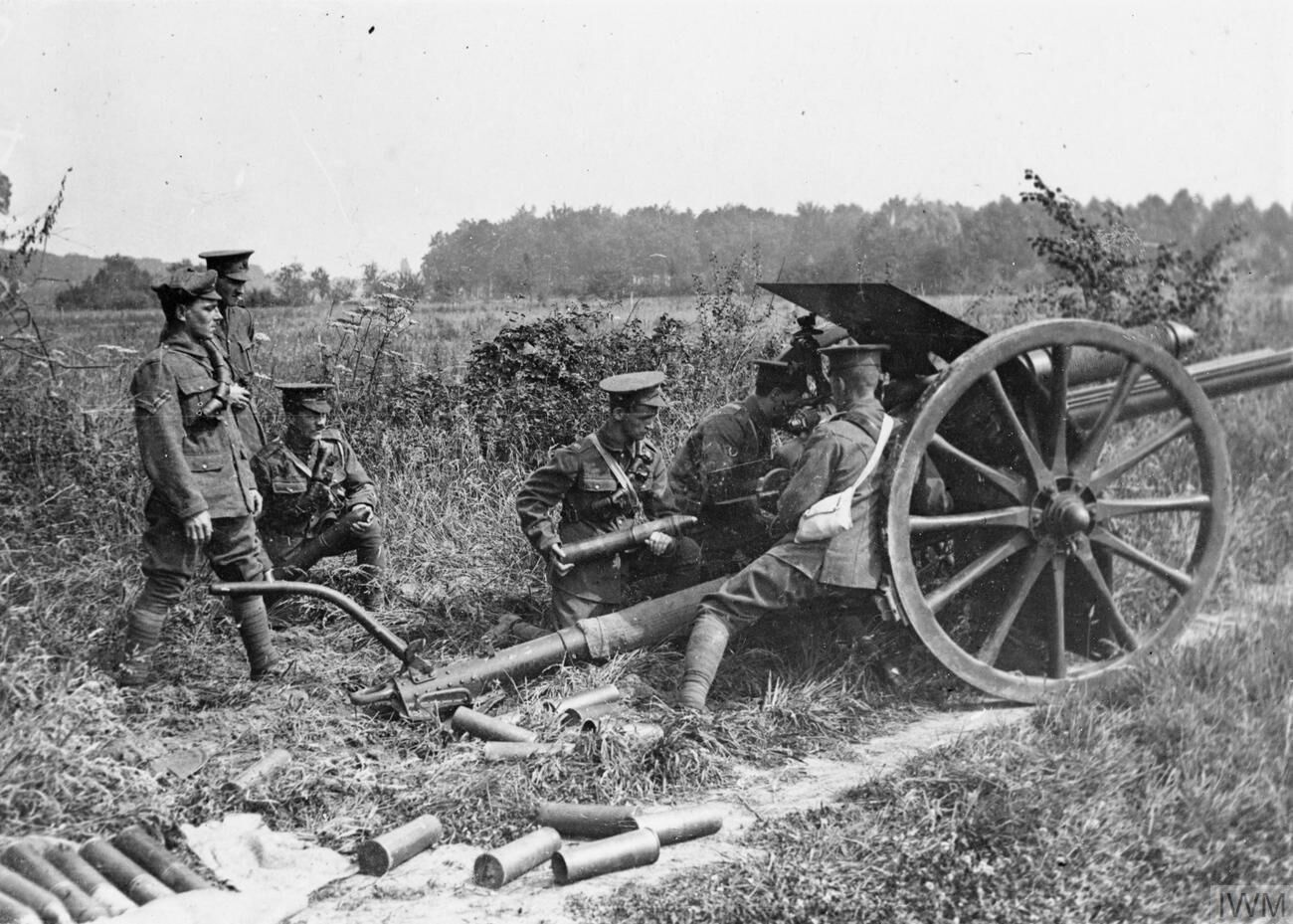
18-pounder in action on the Somme

In July, 51st (Highland) Division joined in the Somme Offensive. An attack on 14 July had failed to capture the dominating ground of High Wood, and 51st (H) Division was tasked with renewing the attack on High Wood a week later. A night attack was to be tried: the bombardment began at 19.00 on 22 July, under the direction of low-flying artillery observation aircraft. German sources reported that the shelling was of 'painful accuracy' and prevented the troops in High Wood from being relieved, despite the number of casualties. At 01.30 the following morning, the division attacked, but by 03.00 they were back on their start line having suffered heavy casualties. British gunners had difficulty supporting attacks on High Wood, because they had to fire over Bazentin Ridge. The low elevation of the guns meant that shells skimmed the British trenches, the margin for error was small and numerous complaints were made that British infantry casualties were caused by friendly fire. Worn guns, defective ammunition and inaccurate information about the location of British infantry positions were blamed for short-shooting. The setback seemed to confirm the division's nickname of 'Harper's Duds' (from their commander, Major-General George Harper, and their 'HD' formation badge). The division was withdrawn from the front on 7 August for rest and reorganisation. On 23 August, CCLV Bde was reorganised again: the former D Bty rejoined from CCLVIII Bde together with the Right Section of C/CCLVIII Bty, to bring A, B and C Btys up to six guns each.

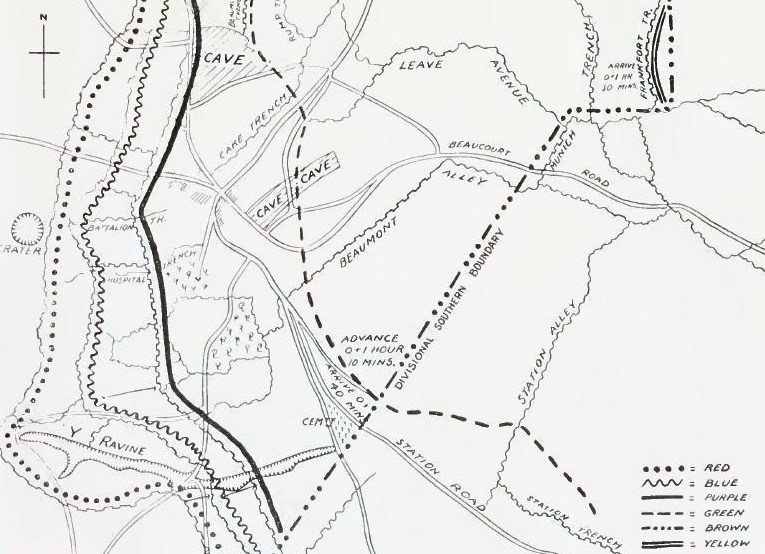
51st (Highland) Division's objectives at Beaumont-Hamel on 13 November 1916.

The division returned to the front in October for the Battle of the Ancre Heights, the final series of actions of the Somme Offensive. A mass of guns was assembled, with the artillery of no less than eight divisions and eight heavy artillery groups supporting 51st (H) Division's attack on Beaumont-Hamel, which had been an uncaptured objective on the first day of the offensive on 1 July. The operation was planned for 24 October, and the batteries began firing to cut the barbed wire on 20 October, but it was postponed several times because of bad weather. Eventually 13 November was chosen. H hour was 05.45, when the 18-pounders started a Creeping barrage (a recent innovation) moving in front of the infantry at 100 yards (91 m) every five minutes. A quarter of the 18-pounders deliberately fired 100 yards (91 m) short of the barrage line – this would have suppressed German outposts sheltering in shell craters in No man's land. The attack was helped by a dense fog, which screened the infantry from retaliatory shellfire as they struggled through the mud towards their objectives. The barrage halted for an hour on the first objective before moving on. Some of the infantry were held up by machine guns in the notorious 'Y Ravine', which had caused so much trouble on 1 July, but reserves were employed and both attacking brigades had reached the third German trench line (the Purple Line) by 07.50. The Green Line was next taken, but the fourth wave of attackers lost the barrage on their way to the final (Yellow) objectives and had to pull back to the Green Line to consolidate a position in captured trenches. Beaumont Hamel had finally fallen, and 51st (Highland) Division had gone some way to shaking off the 'Harper's Duds' slur.

On 25 January 1917, the Right Section of C (H) Bty of CCLX (1/I Lowland) Bde joined to bring D Bty up to six howitzers C (H)/CCLX had originally been 535 (H) Bty, formed in the UK in 1916). CCLV Brigade then had the following organisation until the end of the war:

- A (1/1st Aberdeen + half D Bty) – 6 x 18-pdrs
- B (1/2nd Aberdeen + half D Bty) – 6 x 18-pdrs
- C (1/3rd Aberdeen + half C/CCLVIII Bty) – 6 x 18-pdrs
- D (1/1st Renfrewshire (H) + half 535 (H) Bty) – 6 x 4.5-inch howitzers

==== Arras ====
For the Battle of Arras opening on 9 April, the biggest concentration of guns yet seen was assembled, all working to a single plan. 51st (H) Division was in XVII Corps, where the field batteries were placed from 1,400 yards (1,300 m) to 2,000 yards (1,800 m) yards behind the line. The 18-pdrs began firing a creeping barrage at Zero hour to protect the infantry advance while 4.5s laid down a standing barrage on each objective in turn. The barrage lasted for over 10 hours, advancing at a prescribed rate onto the final objective, over 7,000 yards (6,400 m) from the guns, some of which were moved forward during the day. Overall, XVII Corps' attack was a great success, even though some of 51st Highland's men were held up by unsubdued machine guns and drifted away from their barrage. After the first day, the successes were harder won: the British guns had to move up through appalling conditions, and the follow-up attacks were less well planned and executed.

51st (H) Division attacked again at Gavrelle on 23 April under a full barrage (the 2nd Battle of the Scarpe), with the chemical works and village of Roeux as its objectives, but could not hold Roeux itself. The divisional artillery supported an attack by 34th Division on 28 April (the Battle of Arleux). The fire was not as effective as had been hoped, failing to cut the barbed wire or subdue all the enemy machine guns, although a German counter-attack was 'mown down by the 18-pounders firing shrapnel'. 51st (H) Division distinguished itself in the eventual capture and defence of Roeux.

==== Ypres ====
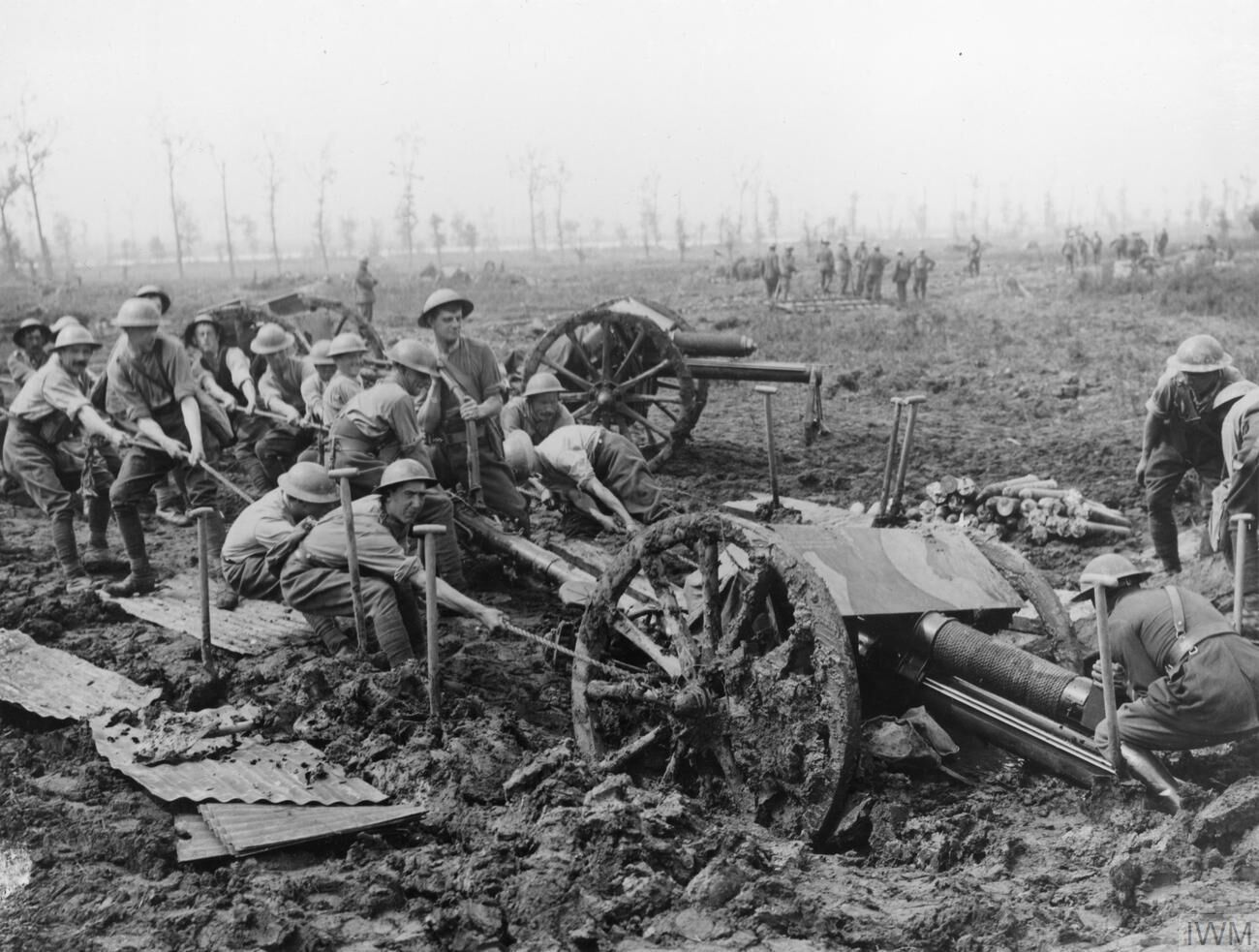
18-pounder being hauled out of mud at Ypres, 1917

An even greater concentration of guns was massed for the Third Ypres Offensive, but the circumstances were less favourable. Gun batteries were packed into the Ypres Salient, where they were under observation and counter-battery (CB) fire from the Germans on the higher ground. Casualties among guns and gunners were high even before Zero hour on 31 July (the Battle of Pilckem Ridge). Two thirds of the field guns fired a creeping barrage, the other third and the 4.5-inch howitzers provided the standing barrage. 51st (H) Division reached the German second line and was consolidating when it was hit by a German counter-bombardment followed by a counter-attack. The British guns fired their pre-arranged protective barrages and destroyed the counterattack. Gains had been made, but now the rain came, and the guns had to move up through shell-churned mud to fresh positions before the attack could be renewed, and continued to suffer badly from German CB fire. 51st (H) Division was relieved on 8 August.

The division was back in the line for the Battle of the Menin Road Ridge starting at 05.40 on 20 September. This was a limited attack made with massive artillery support. 51st (H) Division attacked towards the Poelcappelle Spur with one brigade (154th (3rd Highland) Brigade), supported by 22 batteries of 18-pdrs and six of 4.5s. At first the going was heavy and there was strong German resistance at 'Pheasant Trench', but thereafter there were no problems and the brigade had occupied its final objective across the spur by 08.25. A heavy German bombardment in the afternoon was followed by a counter-attack, but this was completely destroyed by the British artillery.

==== Cambrai ====
51st (Highland) Division was then moved south to take part in Third Army's surprise attack with tanks against the Hindenburg Line at Cambrai on 20 November. There was no preliminary bombardment, but for the attack the divisional artillery was reinforced, firing a lifting barrage of smoke, high explosive (HE) and shrapnel shells. The initial attack was a brilliant success, but on 51st (H) Division's front the advance stalled once the tanks crossed the Flesquières ridge, where many were knocked out by unsuppressed enemy guns. Artillery support could not be requested because of broken communications. The fight at Flesquières went on all afternoon, but the Highlanders made little ground. However, the defenders in the village were almost cut off, and withdrew during the night. By now, the division's guns were moving up into the former No man's land. They began a bombardment at 07.05 the following morning and at 07.30 the Highlanders moved on across the Graincourt road, but could not take the village of Cantaing until tanks came up. Although 51st (H) Division took Fontaine by 23 November, German opposition was stiffening, and the troops had to consolidate a line.

The infantry of 51st (H) Division had been relieved by the time the German counter-attack came on 30 November, but the divisional artillery remained in the line, supporting 59th (2nd North Midland) Division. The attack against the 59th was easily broken by the guns of 51st (H) and Guards Division. But breakthroughs elsewhere meant a scrambled retirement to a line further back.

==== Spring Offensive ====
In March 1918, it was clear that the Germans were planning a major offensive on the Western Front. Air photos revealed signs of these preparations on 51st (H) Division's front, including numerous rectangular mounds in the valley of the River Agache that the staff dubbed 'lice'. The divisional artillery probed these curious mounds by firing a 4.5-inch howitzer at one: it exploded, revealing the lice to be ammunition dumps. A divisional shoot was therefore carried out, exploding over a hundred of these dumps to explode. Probing fire revealed similar dumps in all the known German gun positions, whether or not they were occupied. To meet the anticipated attack, 51st (H) Division deployed its guns in depth. Each RFA brigade (CCLV was supporting 152nd (1st Highland) Bde in the division's centre) deployed nine 18-pdrs and four 4.5s forward, with the remainder of the guns in the main battery positions 3,500 yards (3,200 m) back. In addition, 51st Divisional Artillery deployed seven single 18-pdrs and two old 15-pdrs as anti-tank guns in the support and reserve line where they could cover the main approaches over open sights. On the afternoon of 20 March, a patrol observed large numbers of German troops in fighting order entering their trenches, obviously preparing for an attack. All the available divisional and corps guns opened fire on these assembly trenches and the Agache Valley.

The German spring offensive was launched on the misty morning of 21 March 1918 with a massive bombardment from 05.00. This was particularly severe on the left of 51st (H) Division and the neighbouring 6th Division. All the battery positions, whether they had been active or silent, and the HQs were shelled with HE and Mustard gas. Within 15 minutes, almost all communications had been knocked out, and the mist prevented observation. Most of the forward and anti-tank guns were destroyed by shellfire. One gun of A/CCLV Bty fired over 100 rounds into the advancing enemy over open sights before the survivors of the detachment destroyed their gun and withdrew to Doignies, which came under heavy attack. The German bombardment slackened off on 51st (H) Division's front after 07.00, but remained intense on 6th Division. The mist had cleared about midday and despite their heavy casualties the batteries could now fire at observed targets. On 51st (H) Division's front the attacking Germans described the British artillery fire as 'unbearable'. However, the division's flank had already been turned, Doignies was captured and the division had to swing back to a 'switch' line. All of B/CCLV Bty's guns had been destroyed, and attempts to withdraw A and C Btys were defeated by heavy machine gun fire. Only D Bty of the brigade got away, after a daring piece of work by Capt Manuel. By nightfall, 51st (H) Division was still manning a continuous line in the rear of the main battle zone.

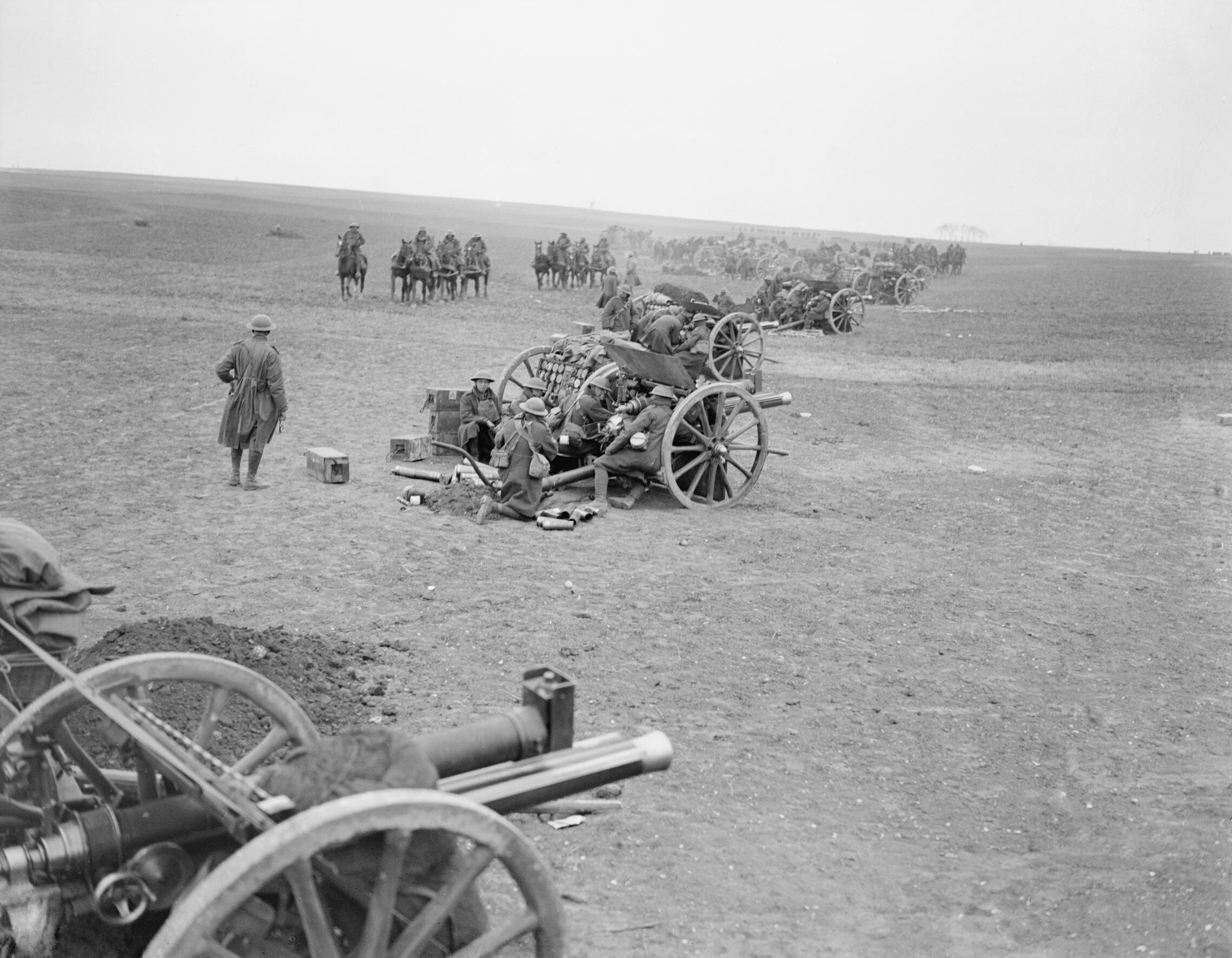
An 18-pounder battery in action in the open during the German Spring Offensive.

During the night reinforcements came up from 25th Division, and CCLV Bde was allocated two batteries of CXII Bde to make up its losses.

The Germans maintained the pressure on the following day, attempting to widen the hole in the division's flank. large numbers of Germans were seen at 2,000 yards (1,800 m) range and the British guns did great execution among them. At dusk CCLV Bde slipped away to the new line being taken up by 51st (H) Division. That night 51st (H) Divisional Artillery received 17 new guns to replace those it had lost. Over the next two days, the division retired slowly, its units becoming increasingly tired and reduced in numbers. On 23 March the very weak 152nd Bde threw back three attacks with rifle and artillery fire. Next day, the division pulled back into the Red (fourth) Line behind other formations that took over holding the Green (third) Line, covered by 51st (D) Division's guns. On 24 March, all the artillery of the divisions in IV Corps was pooled, CCLV Bde forming part of 'Right Group'. About 14.00 the infantry in front began to give way, and the artillery group had to withdraw, CCLV Bde going between Irles and Puisieux. 51st (H) continued to hold the Red Line all day, forming a defensive flank, before falling back during the night. On 25 March 51st (H) Division was presented with some remarkable targets of German masses at long range, which were prevented from closing, but the enemy continued to move round the flank. However, reserves came up, and the exhausted 51st (H) Division was finally withdrawn that evening for rest.

51st (H) Division was sent north to First Army, absorbing drafts of reinforcements en route. The divisional artillery arrived on the evening of 9 April, just after the second phase of the German offensive (Operation Georgette) had struck First Army (the Battle of the Lys). The division's infantry had already been thrown into the gap left by the defeat of the 2nd Portuguese Division. The infantry and artillery together held the line through the next critical days. That evening, Germans were observed collecting for a new attack, and the artillery laid down harassing fire on their approach roads through the night. Soon after dawn, the battery positions became untenable, so they opened rapid fire on the advancing enemy as each battery in turn withdrew to its new position and resumed covering fire for the others, CCLV Bde ending up near the eastern edge of Pacaut Wood. During 13 April, 51st (H) Division was able to patch up a defence line, which it held for the next 10 days.

51st (H) Division was sent back south in July to assist the French in the Second Battle of the Marne. The divisional artillery covered 80 miles (130 km) in three days, crossing the Marne near Épernay at 02.00 on 20 July. After a short halt, they pushed on, reaching their assembly position near Nanteuil-la-Fosse, and CCLV Bde was in action 500 yards (460 m) by 10.00, although they were only engaged in harassing fire during the Battle of Tardenois, while the division's infantry had attacked behind a barrage fired by French and Italian field guns. An enemy counter-attack was expected, so the batteries were withdrawn at dusk, leaving a few guns in close support of the infantry during the night. In fact, the Germans withdrew across the Marne and, when the division attacked again the following morning, the information on enemy positions was so poor that the barrage was fired too far ahead to be of use. On 23 and 27 July, the division put in better-organised attacks behind barrages fired by its own artillery supported by French guns, against the now-retreating Germans. On 28 July, in the closing stages of the battle, CCLV Bde moved up through the village of Chaumuzy under shellfire, having been misinformed that it was already in friendly hands.

==== Hundred Days Offensive ====
In August, all the Allied armies began attacking in the Hundred Days Offensive. 51st (H) Division returned from the French sector and joined the Canadian Corps in First Army in late August for the Battle of the Scarpe on 26 August. 51st (H) divisional artillery supplemented by that of 16th (Irish) Division to provide a barrage for its own division's attack on the second objective against little opposition. The division attacked Greenland Hill the following day and failed to capture it, but succeeded two days later behind another barrage from 51st (H) and 16th (I) divisional artillery.

After the Battle of the Selle, the Allied armies began a pursuit. By 26 October, First Army was lagging behind the advance, and 51st (H) Division was among those given the task of pushing on. The divisional artillery was supplemented by that of 39th Division together with army brigades and heavies. The attack went well, even though in some places the infantry lost the barrage. The Germans were now badly shaken and exhausted, and the campaign developed into a pursuit, although one serious counter-attack was broken up by the guns on 1 November. From 29 October, the infantry of 51st (H) Division began to be withdrawn from the line, but the divisional artillery remained in action. On 1 November it supported 49th (West Riding) Division's assault crossing of the Rhonelle (the Battle of Valenciennes), and it remained in action until the Armistice with Germany came into force on 11 November.

After the Armistice, the division went into billets and demobilisation began. This was completed by mid-March 1919, and CCLV Bde passed into suspended animation.

=== 2/I Highland Brigade ===
Recruiting for the 2nd Line unit was good, and 2/I Highland was raised at North Silver Street by the end of 1914. 2nd Highland Division formed in January 1915 (numbered as 64th (2nd Highland) Division in August) but the lack of equipment and need to supply drafts to 1st Line units delayed training. The division was not fully assembled around Perth until August 1915, with 2/I Highland Bde at Edzell, moving into Perth for winter quarters in November. In January 1916, the division was assigned to the 'Eighth New Army', and in March it division moved south to Norfolk and joined Northern Army (Home Forces). By May, the artillery brigades had received 18-pounders and that month they were numbered: 2/I Highland became CCCXX (320) Brigade and the batteries became A, B and C. Later, CCCXXIII (2/III Highland) (H) Bde was broken up, with one battery joining CCCXX as D (H) Bty.

In Autumn 1916, A/CCXCIII (2/III County of London) Bty from 58th (2/1st London) Division was temporarily attached to the brigade. In November, a new CCCXXII Bde of 18-pdr batteries was raised by V Reserve Bde, RFA, and joined the division; however, on 29 January 1917, this was broken up to bring the existing batteries up to six guns each.

By the winter of 1917, the division had become solely a training organisation, with no Highland associations. The artillery were quartered around Norwich, Aylsham and Haveringland, then in the summer of 1918 Westwick Park replaced Haveringland. In the winter of 1918, quarters at Reepham replaced Westwick Park. The division remained in Norfolk until after the Armistice, and was demobilised by April 1919.

== Interwar ==
The 1st Highland Brigade re-formed in 51st (Highland) Division on 7 February 1920 with three Aberdeen batteries and one formed by the former Inverness-shire Royal Horse Artillery based in Inverness. When the TF was reorganised as the Territorial Army (TA) in 1921, the brigade was redesignated 75th (Highland) Brigade, RFA, (becoming a Field Brigade, RA, in 1924 when the RFA was subsumed into the Royal Artillery) with the following organisation:

- HQ at Ruby Lane, North Silver Street, Aberdeen
- 297 (Inverness) Field Bty at Margaret Street, Inverness
- 298 (City of Aberdeen) Field Bty at Ruby Lane
- 299 (City of Aberdeen) Field Bty (Howitzers) at Ruby Lane
- 300 (City of Aberdeen) Field Bty at Ruby Lane

The establishment of a TA divisional artillery brigade was four 6-gun batteries, three equipped with 18-pounders and one with 4.5-inch howitzers, all of First World War patterns. However, the batteries only held four guns in peacetime. The guns and their first-line ammunition wagons were still horsedrawn and the battery staffs were mounted. Partial mechanisation was carried out from 1927, but the guns retained iron-tyred wheels until pneumatic tyres began to be introduced just before the Second World War.

In 1938, the RA modernised its nomenclature and a lieutenant-colonel's command was designated a 'regiment' rather than a 'brigade'; this applied to TA field brigades from 1 November 1938. The TA was doubled in size after the Munich Crisis, and most regiments split to form duplicates. Part of the reorganisation was that field regiments changed from four six-gun batteries to an establishment of two batteries, each of three four-gun troops. For the Highland regiment, this resulted in the following organisation from 24 June 1939:

== Second World War ==
=== Mobilisation ===
The TA was doubled in size following the Munich Crisis of 1938, with existing units splitting to form duplicates before the outbreak of the Second World War. 75th Field Regiment reorganised as follows:

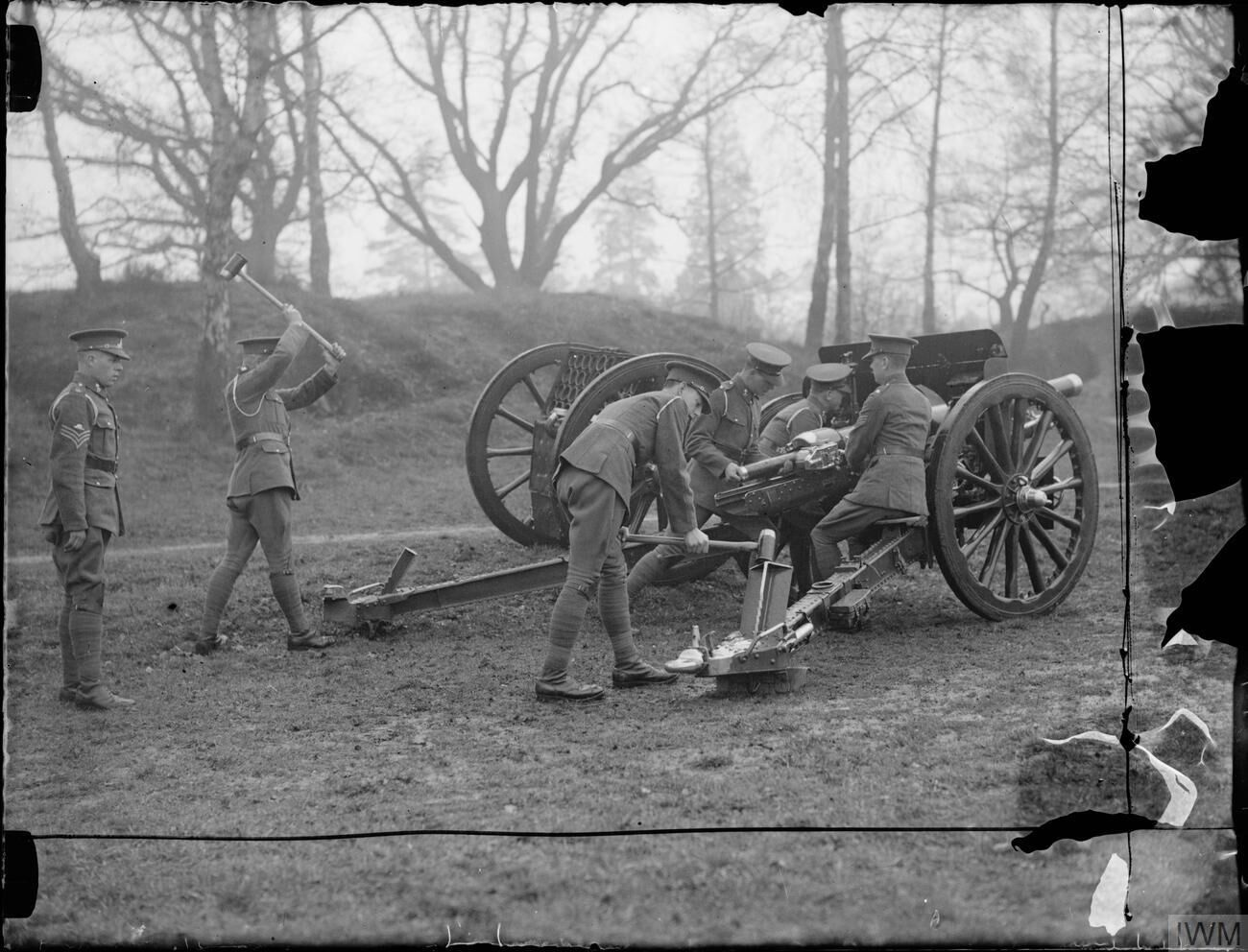
Emplacing an 18-pounder with wooden wheels at the start of the Second World War

75th (Highland) Field Regiment

- RHQ at Aberdeen
- 299 (City of Aberdeen) Field Bty
- 300 (City of Aberdeen) Field Bty

126th Field Regiment

- RHQ at Aberdeen
- 297 (City of Aberdeen) Field Bty – newly raised
- 298 (City of Aberdeen) Field Bty

The former 297 Field Battery was converted into 297 (Inverness) Heavy Anti-Aircraft Battery, an independent unit that later joined 101st Heavy Anti-Aircraft Regiment, serving in the defence of Scapa Flow and later in the Burma Campaign. The establishment of a field battery was increased to 12 guns organised into three Troops.

=== 75th (Highland) Field Regiment ===
51st (Highland) Division mobilised in Scottish Command at the outbreak of war, moved to Aldershot Command in October 1939, and joined the British Expeditionary Force (BEF) in France on 24 January 1940. On 22 April, it was sent for a tour of duty with 3rd French Army on the Saar Front, and took over a section of the line in front of the Maginot Line forts by 6 May. Here the gun positions came under occasional shellfire as the German guns registered their targets.

==== Battle of France ====
The Battle of France began on 10 May with the German invasion of the Low Countries. While the rest of the BEF responded by executing the pre-arranged Plan D by advancing into Belgium, 51st (H) Division stayed on the Saar Front, which remained quiet until 13 May. At 04.00 that morning, the Germans began a heavy bombardment, which was answered by 51st (H) Division's guns firing their defensive fire (DF) tasks. Three strong probing attacks were driven off by the infantry and guns. Attacks on the following days were half-hearted. On the night of 22/23 May, the division was relieved in the line and concentrated 25 miles of Metz. By now, German troops had reached Boulogne and cut off the BEF, and 51st (H) Division was ordered to move west to link up with the British 1st Armoured Division operating south of the Somme.

At the beginning of June, as the last of the BEF was evacuated from Dunkirk, 51st (H) Division went into action facing the German bridgehead over the Somme at Abbeville. With French troops under command it was ordered to attack Mareuil-Caubert and the high ground south of Gouy on the morning of 4 June. Although 1st Battalion Gordon Highlanders made some progress, having worked out a system of Very lights to call down fire from the divisional artillery against German machine gun positions, the other attacks failed, and it proved impossible to hold the Gordons' small gains. The following day, the Germans went over to the offensive, attacking all along the division's front. The Highlanders were slowly driven back from the widely spaced villages they held. Some batteries held on in forward positions until they were almost engulfed.

By 7 June, 51st (H) Division had been forced back to the line of the Bresle, but this line was outflanked by German Panzers racing for Rouen, and the division received orders to withdraw during the night of 8/9 June. During 9 June, the division was cut off, and that night an ad hoc brigade group formed at Arques-la-Bataille and known as Arkforce was sent back to protect the approaches to Le Havre, where Operation Cycle was under way to evacuate base troops. Arkforce was formed around 154 Bde and accompanied by 75th (Highland) Fd Rgt. It set off during the night of 9/10 June, but shortly after it arrived the rest of 51st (H) Division was cut off from Le Havre. While the division was forced back to Saint-Valery-en-Caux and forced to surrender on 12 June, Arkforce was successfully evacuated from Le Havre the following day, first to Cherbourg Naval Base where a new BEF was being formed, then to the UK on 15 June (Operation Aerial) after that attempt was abandoned.

==== Home Defence ====
Back in the UK, the regiment was assigned to a newly formed 31st Independent Brigade Group from 2 July 1940. This brigade was composed of Regular infantry battalions brought back from garrison duty in India. It joined IV Corps, part of the mobile forces defending the UK against the expected invasion (Operation Sea Lion). Later, it was stationed in South Wales as part of Western Command. However, the invasion never came and the regiment left on 4 December 1941 when 31st Bde was converted into 1st Airlanding Brigade.

One of the lessons learned from the Battle of France was that the two-battery organisation did not work: field regiments were intended to support an infantry brigade of three battalions. As a result, they were reorganised into three 8-gun batteries, but it was not until late 1940 that the RA had enough trained battery staffs to carry out the reorganisation. 75th (H) Field Rgt accordingly formed 'X' Fd Bty on 15 February 1941, when the regiment was stationed at Monmouth; it was later numbered as 453 Fd Bty.

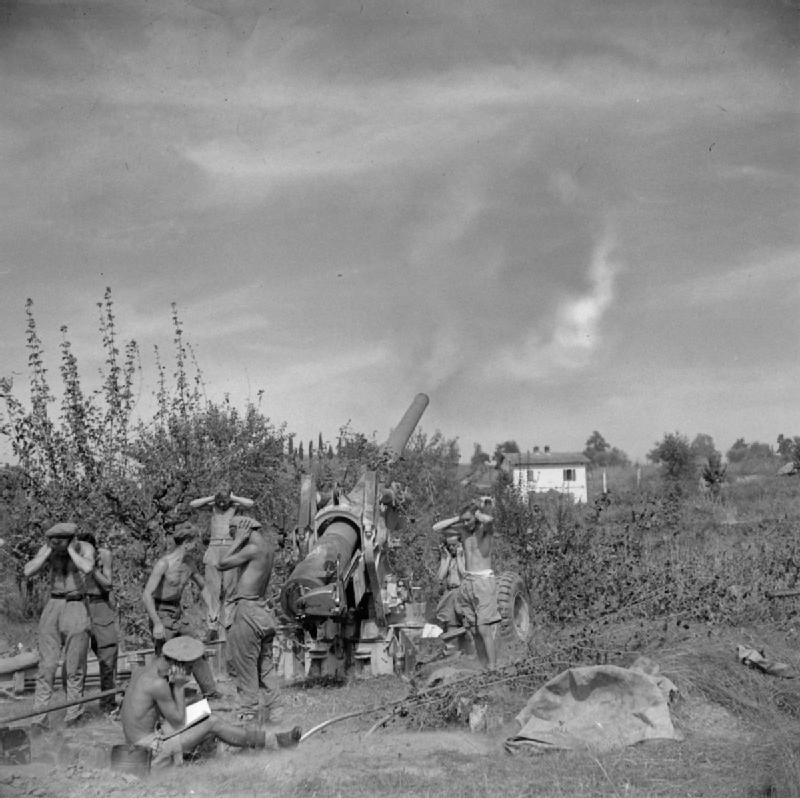
A 155 mm gun of 75th Heavy Rgt in action against German positions on the Gothic Line, 13 September 1944.

By August 1942, 75th (H) Fd Rgt was serving as the Depot Regiment at the School of Artillery at Larkhill in Southern Command, with its own Light Aid Detachment (LAD) of the Royal Electrical and Mechanical Engineers (REME) and its own Signal Section of the Royal Corps of Signals. It left this role in January 1943; from 1 February to 10 April, it was part of 47th (London) Infantry Division, a home defence formation serving in Hampshire and Dorset District.

=== 75th (Highland) Heavy Regiment ===
The regiment was next shipped to Tunisia, where it joined 1st Army Group Royal Artillery (AGRA) in First Army at the end of the Tunisian Campaign. Here, it was converted into 75th (Highland) Heavy Regiment on 23 September 1943, with 299, 300 and 453 Hvy Btys converted from the field Btys of the same number, and with 504 Hvy Bty converted from 504 Fd Bty of 140th Fd Rgt.

75th Heavy Rgt moved to Sicily and then served in the Italian Campaign from September 1943 until the end of the war. For part of this time it was serving as the heavy regiment with 6th AGRA. It passed into suspended animation on 15 February 1946.

=== 126th (Highland) Field Regiment ===
126th Field Rgt mobilised in 9th (Highland) Infantry Division, the 2nd Line duplicate of 51st (H) Division. It remained training in Scottish Command until 7 August 1940 when 9th (H) Division was redesignated as 51st (H) Division to replace the original formation, most of which had been captured at Saint-Valery-en-Caux (see above). The regiment formed its third battery, 490 Fd Bty, when it was stationed at Nairn. It formed a further battery, 516 Fd Bty, at Elgin, Moray, on 14 July 1941; this was transferred to a newly formed 178th Fd Rgt on 19 January 1942. 126th Field Rgt was authorised to use its parent's 'Highland' subtitle on 17 February 1942.

After two years' training in Scotland, the division sailed for Egypt on 16 June 1942, landing on 12 August, with the field regiments each equipped with 24 25-pounder guns.

==== North Africa ====
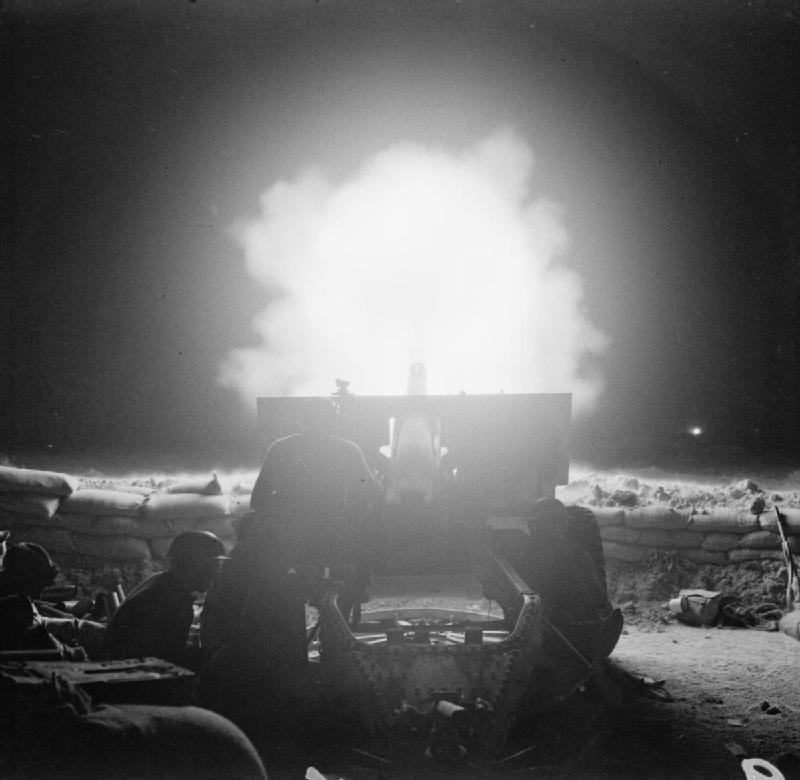
A 25-pounder firing in the British night barrage that launched the Second Battle of El Alamein

For a week (1–8 September) 126th (H) Fd Rgt was attached to 9th Armoured Bde, an independent brigade operating under the command of 'Calforce'. Calforce, commanded by Brigadier Percy Calvert-Jones of 12th Anti-Aircraft Brigade, had fought a long series of rearguard actions at landing grounds during Eighth Army's retreat to the El Alamein position. Calforce had remained in position during the First Battle of El Alamein and was not withdrawn from the front line until September.

51st (Highland) Division's first action was the Second Battle of El Alamein. It moved up during the preceding nights, occupying gun positions and dumping ammunition, and remaining concealed during daylight. For the first time in the Western Desert Campaign, the Eighth Army had enough 25-pounders to allow them to be concentrated and switched from one set-piece target to another. Almost every gun was used to neutralise enemy batteries. The bombardment began at 21.40 on 23 October and lasted for 15 minutes; then, after 5 minutes silence, they opened again on the enemy's forward positions and the infantry began to advance. After a further 7 minutes, the guns began firing concentrations at a succession of specific locations. The whole artillery programme lasted for 5 hours 30 minutes. 51st (H) Division ran into several centres of resistance and only on the extreme left did it reach its final objective; however, the 'break-in' phase of the battle had started well.

On the second night of the battle, 51st (H) Division's guns fired a similar succession of CB tasks, concentrations and then a barrage to support 1st Armoured Division's attack. On the night of 25/26 October, 51st (H) Division made progress towards its own objective as the 'dog-fight' phase continued. The 'break-out' phase began on the night of 1/2 November with Operation Supercharge, preceded by another powerful barrage. In the early hours of 4 November 51st (H) Division broke through to the Rahman Track, and the Axis forces began to retreat.

51st (H) Division then took part in the pursuit to El Agheila and Tripoli in January 1943. By 25 February, it was past Medenine in Tunisia and facing the Mareth Line. The Axis force made a spoiling attack on 6 March (the Battle of Medenine) but there was plenty of warning and the advance was easily repulsed. 51st (H) Division had already moved most of its artillery south in waiting for the attack, leaving three Troops to move and fire between various positions to simulate the whole divisional artillery remaining in its old positions.

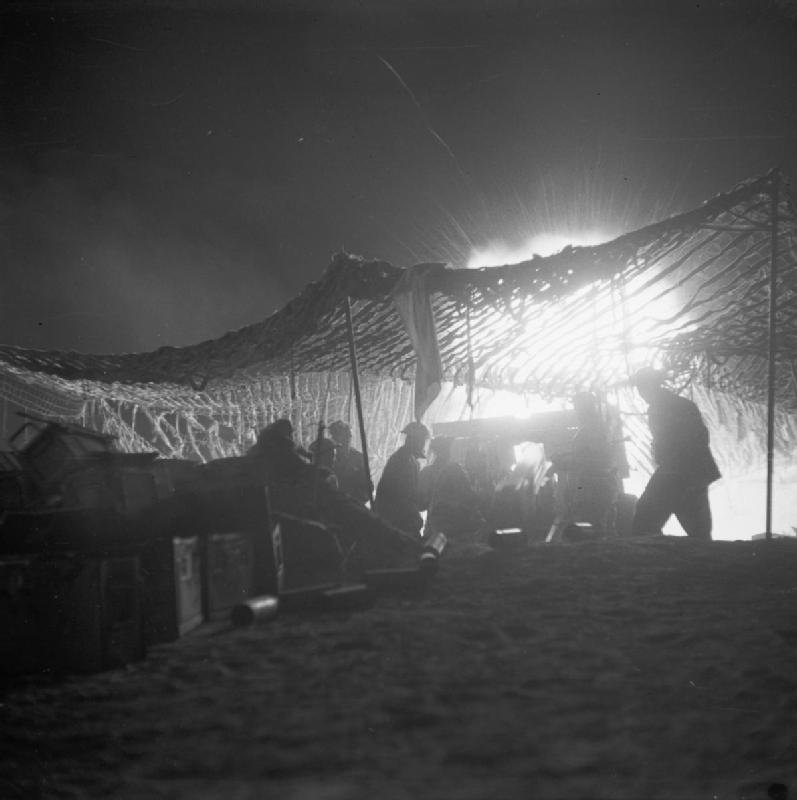
25-pounder gun in action at night during the assault on the Mareth Line.

The Battle of the Mareth Line began on the night of 16/17 March when 51st (H) Division took the outpost line against negligible opposition. The main attack followed on 20/21 March, with another massive night barrage. But little progress was made over the Wadi Zigzaou for the first two days and the line held until it was outflanked by other forces in the south. The Axis defence collapsed on 28 March and the following day 51st (H) Division was on its way to Gabès.

The next Axis defence line was along Wadi Akarit. The barrage for 51st (H) Division's assault began at 04.15 on 6 April, followed by four other barrages over five hours, one involving a difficult change of direction, and the division's attack, in the words of the Official History, 'went like clockwork'. Axis troops then began counter-attacks and the Highlanders had to fight hard to hold their gains. The pursuit was resumed the following day, through Sfax, after which the divisional artillery was in action in the hill country near Enfidaville. This lasted until the fall of Tunis and the end of the campaign on 15 May.

==== Sicily ====
126th Field Rgt then rested and trained for the Allied landings in Sicily (Operation Husky). The regiment landed shortly after the assault infantry on 10 July. The division was moving forward by nightfall, with the objectives of Palazzolo Acreide and Vizzini, which it reached by the night of 14/15 July. Despite some fierce fighting, the division continued with scarcely a pause towards the Dittaino river.

On 17 July, the division deployed to cross the Dittaino and attempt to capture Paternò. It achieved a bridgehead but further advance was checked; so, on the night of 20/21 July, the division sent a composite force of infantry and armour against the main enemy defences at Gerbini Airfield. Although the attack succeeded, fierce counter-attacks by the Hermann Goring Division drove the Highlanders out the following morning, after which 51st (H) Division was put onto the defensive.

51st (H) Division's artillery joined in XXX Corps' artillery preparation for operations against Adrano (the battles round Etna). This began on 31 July while 51st (H) took bridgeheads over the Dittaino. Paternò fell on 4 August, Biancavilla on 6 August. The division began a 50 miles (80 km) 'sidestep' on 12 August and the guns came into action north of Zafferana the following night. By now, the Axis forces were evacuating Sicily, which was completed on 17 August.

51st (H) Division did not take part in the subsequent Italian Campaign, having been earmarked for the Allied invasion of Normandy Operation Overlord. However, its guns did assist in the massive bombardment covering the assault crossing of the Strait of Messina on 3 September (Operation Baytown). The division embarked for the UK on 7 November and disembarked at Liverpool on 26 November. It then went into training for Overlord.

==== Normandy ====
51st (Highland) Division was in the first follow-up wave of formations in Overlord. On 2 June 1944 it embarked on Liberty ships at East India Docks, London, bound for Normandy and began landing on 7 June (D + 1). The guns went into action supporting the Orne bridgehead. On 23 June, the division expanded the bridgehead by a night attack at Ste Honorine la Chardonnerette. The guns had remained silent before the attack to ensure surprise, after which the enemy's successive attempts to recover the village were stopped by artillery fire. The division supported 3rd Division's attack on the flank of Operation Goodwood. On 8 August, 51st (H) Division spearheaded II Canadian Corps' attack towards Falaise (Operation Totalize), preceded by a massive barrage. The attack began before dawn and by first light the break-in was going well, with a number of villages taken. After a second artillery preparation, the 4th Canadian and 1st Polish Armoured Divisions passed through to continue the advance. The Canadians renewed the advance to Falaise on 14 August in Operation Tractable, with 51st (H) Division attacking towards the Liaison Valley on the left flank. By 21 August, the Falaise Pocket had been closed and the division was advancing eastwards towards Lisieux.

51st (H) Division then moved up to and across the Seine for the assault on Le Havre (Operation Astonia). This was a major operation with a massive field artillery preparation alongside support from medium guns and RAF bombers, which cowed the opposition. It was followed by a similar assault to take Boulogne (Operation Wellhit). The division next made a long move to the Antwerp area at the end of September, then spent three weeks in the line at Sint-Oedenrode.

==== Low Countries ====
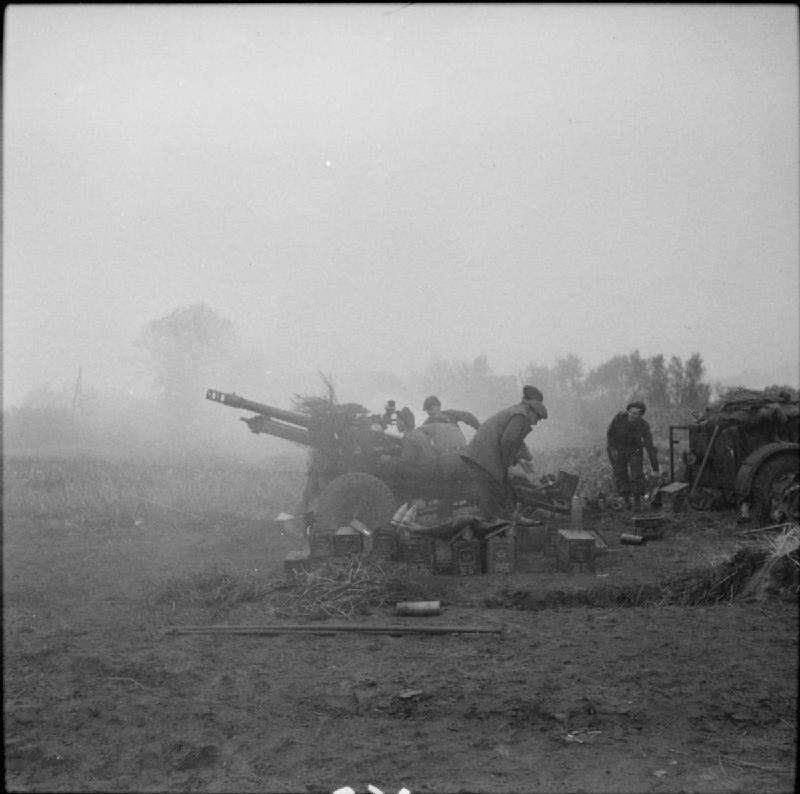
25-pounder firing during the advance on 's-Hertogenbosch on 23 October 1944.

The division's next offensive action was west of 's-Hertogenbosch on the night of 23 October, with massive artillery support the infantry took all their objectives, with follow-up advances over succeeding days through Loon op Zand and across the Afwaterings Canal towards the Meuse (Dutch: Maas) by early November. On 14 November, the division carried out an assault crossing of the Willems Canal near Weert accompanied by another heavy artillery barrage, then moved on to the Zig Canal and crossed that on 17 November with much less preparation.

51st (H) Division was then moved to hold 'The Island', the wet low-lying country between Nijmegen and Arnhem that had been captured during Operation Market Garden (see above). In mid-December, the division was pulled out of the line for rest. In December, the division was suddenly moved south as part of the response to the German breakthrough in the Ardennes (the Battle of the Bulge), and 51st (H) Division fought its way into the flank of the 'Bulge' in winter conditions.

==== Rhineland ====
Like 3rd Division, 51st (H) Division was engaged in the fighting in the Reichswald (Operation Veritable). It began at 05.00 on 8 February with a huge artillery preparation, after which the Highlanders attacked and were on their objectives by 23.00 that night. Over the next two days, the regiment fired smoke and HE to help the brigade continue the advance through the forest. The slow advance continued through Gennep on 11 February, then German counter-attacks were driven off by DF fire. The final phase of the operation for 51st (H) Division began on 18 February against Goch, which was successfully taken after stiff fighting.

The division took a leading part in the Rhine crossing (Operation Plunder). OP parties from the regiment were among the first troops across the river on the night of 23/24 March, while the guns fired throughout the night just 600 yards from the river and under frequent return fire. The division fought its way into Rees, and the guns were brought over two days later. The division then continued through Isselburg and Anholt.

The division reached the Dortmund–Ems Canal on 8 April. After a pause at the canal, it advanced rapidly towards Bremen against delaying actions. It reached Delmenhorst on 20 April and closed in on the centre of Bremen. The German surrender at Lüneburg Heath ended the fighting on 5 May.

126th (Highland) Field Regiment passed into suspended animation in British Army of the Rhine on 1 April 1946.

== Postwar ==
When the TA was reconstituted on 1 January 1947, 126th (Highland) Fd Rgt was formally disbanded, while 75th (Highland) Hvy Rgt reformed at Aberdeen as 275th (Highland) Field Regiment, including R Battery at Grangemouth. It was once more in 51st (Highland) Division. When Anti-Aircraft Command was disbanded in 1955, the regiment absorbed 501st Heavy Anti-Aircraft Rgt at Aberdeen (which included the former 297 (Inverness) Bty, see above).

On the reduction of the TA in 1961, the regiment was amalgamated with 276th (Highland) Field Rgt, HQ 51st Infantry Division Counter-Battery Staff Trp and 862 Locating Bty (successor to the North Scottish RGA, see above), to form 400th (Highland) (Aberdeen/Angus) Field Regiment with the following organisation:

- RHQ at Dundee – from 276 (H) Fd Rgt
- P (City of Aberdeen) Bty – from 275 (H) Fd Rgt
- Q (Arbroath/Montrose) Bty – from 862 Bty
- R (City of Dundee) Bty – from 276 (H) Fd Rgt

R Battery of 275th Fd Rgt at Grangemouth was not included in the merger, and was reorganised as 517 (General Transport) Company, Royal Army Service Corps (RASC), which joined other converted RA batteries in forming 433 (Forth) Transport Column, RASC. This unit now forms part of the 154 (Scottish) Regiment, Royal Logistic Corps.

In 1967, the TA was reduced further into the Territorial and Army Volunteer Reserve and 400th Rgt was amalgamated into The Highland Regiment, RA. In 1969, the Highland Regiment was itself reduced to a cadre and then disbanded in 1975. In 1986, 105 (Scottish) Air Defence Regiment was designated as its successor unit.

== Uniforms and insignia ==
Upon formation in 1860, the 1st (Peterhead) AVC wore the RA uniform with white/silver lace instead of yellow/gold. The 3rd (Artisans) AVC wore the RA uniform with four rows of black braid on the tunic, scarlet Austrian knots on the sleeves, scarlet cap bands and brown belts. The 4th (Citizens) AVC wore a blue Frock coat with black braiding, scarlet collars and Austrian knots, blue trousers with black stripes edged scarlet, blue caps with peaks and a black band edged scarlet, and black belts. The 6th (Artisans) AVC wore the same uniform as the 3rd but with black belts. The 7th AVC wore the RA uniform with white/silver cords, a Busby, and white belts. The 1st (Stonehaven) Kincardine AVC wore the RA uniform with white cord, its 2nd Battery (originally the 5th (Cowie) AVC) being composed mainly of fishermen wore a semi-naval dress. The whole administrative brigade adopted the uniform of the 7th AVC in 1864. The plume holder on the busby consisted of a grenade badge with Royal Arms of Scotland on the ball surrounded by a strap bearing the motto 'IN DEFENCE'. A forage cap with white band was used when the busby was not worn. Pouch belts were abandoned in 1875. Standard pattern RA helmets were worn from 1878 onwards.

From 1908, the standard RFA service dress was worn, initially with an unusual pattern of brass shoulder title bearing the words 'ABERDEEN CITY' over 'RFA'. This was later changed to the standard TF pattern with 'T' over 'RFA' over 'ABERDEEN'; the brigade ammunition column wore 'HIGHLAND' in place of 'ABERDEEN'.

== Commanding officers ==
Commanding officers (COs) of the unit include the following:

- Lt-Col William Cosmo Gordon (former captain, Madras Artillery), 21 May 1862
- Lt-Col Francis W. Garden-Campbell (from 1st Banff 1876), Lt-Col Commandant 23 December 1879; returned to 1st Banff 1882
- Lt-Col A.W.A. Youngson, 3 March 1880, Lt-Col Commandant 5 October 1882
- Lt-Col James Ogston, VD, 26 October 1887, Lt-Col Commandant 24 June 1893
- Lt-Col George Milne, VD, 15 May 1901, Lt-Col Commandant 8 October 1904
- Lt-Col M.M. Duncan, VD, 23 August 1913
- Lt-Col F. Fleming, DSO (1/I Highland Bde) March 1918
- Lt-Col T. Davidson, DSO, TD, 27 September 1921
- Lt-Col J. Barclay-Milne, MC, TD, 27 September 1927
- Lt-Col J.R. Cooper, TD, 27 September 1933

== Honorary Colonels ==
The following served as Honorary Colonel of the unit:

- John Hamilton-Gordon, 7th Earl of Aberdeen, later 1st Marquess of Aberdeen and Temair, appointed 14 January 1888
- Col James Ogston, VD, (former CO) appointed 24 March 1922
- Col George Milne, CB, VD, (former CO) appointed 24 March 1928
- Col M.M. Duncan, CMG, VD, (former CO) appointed 24 March 1933
- Col F. Fleming, DSO, TD, appointed 24 March 1938
