= Torry Battery =

- Torry, Aberdeen, Scotland
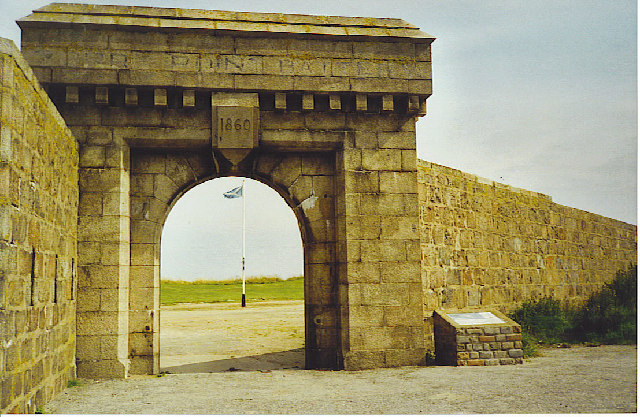
- Torry Point Battery entrance

Site information
- Type: Military Battery
- Open to the public: Yes

Location
- Coordinates: 57°8′31″N 2°3′21″W

Site history
- Built: 1859-61
- Materials: Stone

Scheduled monument
- Official name: Torry Battery
- Type: 20th Century Military and Related: Battery, Secular: battery
- Designated: 7 November 2000
- Reference no.: SM9215

The Torry Battery (formerly referred to as Torry Point Battery) is an artillery battery near Torry in Aberdeen, Scotland, which has overlooked the city's harbour since 1860. It was originally constructed for nine guns with a defensible barracks at the rear. In 1881 the battery mounted three 10-inch Smooth bore guns and five 68-Pounder Smooth bore guns.

The battery was adapted for two 6-inch Breech Loading (BL) guns which were mounted by 1906. These were used for practise by the local artillery volunteer unit, the 1st Aberdeenshire Royal Garrison Artillery (Volunteers).

Both guns were operational during the First World War.

During the First and Second World Wars it was used to defend the city and was finally decommissioned in 1956. It is now a scheduled monument.

== Construction ==
Construction began on Torry Point Battery in 1857 and concluded in 1861. Some sources claim that the battery was constructed to defend against France under Napoleon III, however, city council records and Napoleon III's history of alliance and cooperation with Britain contradict this.

Torry Battery was built as a long overdue replacement of the 1780 battery on the north side of the River Dee. Records show that the Board of Ordinances made its first request for repairs on the existing battery in 1806 and continued to do so until the eventual construction of Torry Battery.

== Modifications ==
In the 1890's the battery was partially dismantled and decommissioned, but was reconstructed from 1904-06 and manned during World War I. The original gun platforms were partly demolished to accommodate for new weapons technology in the First World War and were updated again in the Second World War.

== See also ==
- Coastal fortifications in Scotland

== Bibliography ==
Sinclair, Donald, 1907. The History of the Aberdeen Volunteers, Aberdeen Daily Journal Office, Aberdeen
