= Braefoot Battery =

WWI gun battery in Fife, Scotland

- Part of British coastal defence WW1
- Firth of Forth; Near Dalgety Bay in Scotland, United Kingdom
- Original plan for the Braefoot Battery (1912)

Site information
- Controlled by: Royal Garrison Artillery
- Condition: Derelict

Location
- Coordinates: 56.03651°N 3.32022°W

Site history
- Built: 1915
- In use: 1915-1917
- Materials: Steel-reinforced concrete
- Fate: Decommissioned

Scheduled monument
- Official name: Braefoot Point, battery
- Type: 20th Century Military and Related: Artillery mount; Barracks; Battery; Magazines; Pillbox
- Designated: 4 February 2000
- Reference no.: SM7775

The Braefoot Battery was a World War I coastal defence gun battery defending the Firth of Forth. The battery was constructed in 1915 at Braefoot Point, then part of the Earl of Moray's Donibristle Estate. The site is situated between the new town of Dalgety Bay and Aberdour in Fife.

== Forth defence lines ==
In the First World War three lines of defence were established on the Firth of Forth to protect Rosyth Naval Dockyard, then home to the Battle Cruiser Fleet. These lines of defence were known as the Outer, Middle and Inner Defence Lines.

War Office chart showing the three Forth Defence Lines in WW1

The Outer Line ran from a gun battery at Kinghorn to a battery at Leith Docks, with fortified gun emplacements on the island of Inchkeith.

The Middle Line of defence ran from Braefoot Battery in the North to a battery on Cramond Island in the South, with fortified gun emplacements on the islands of Inchcolm and Inchmickery.

The Inner Line of defence was situated close to the Forth Bridge, with batteries at Downing Point on the North coast and Hound Point on the South coast of the river. Additional batteries were located at Carlingnose Point, Dalmeny, and on the island of Inchgarvie. Each line of defence also had an associated anti-submarine boom.

== Battery specification ==
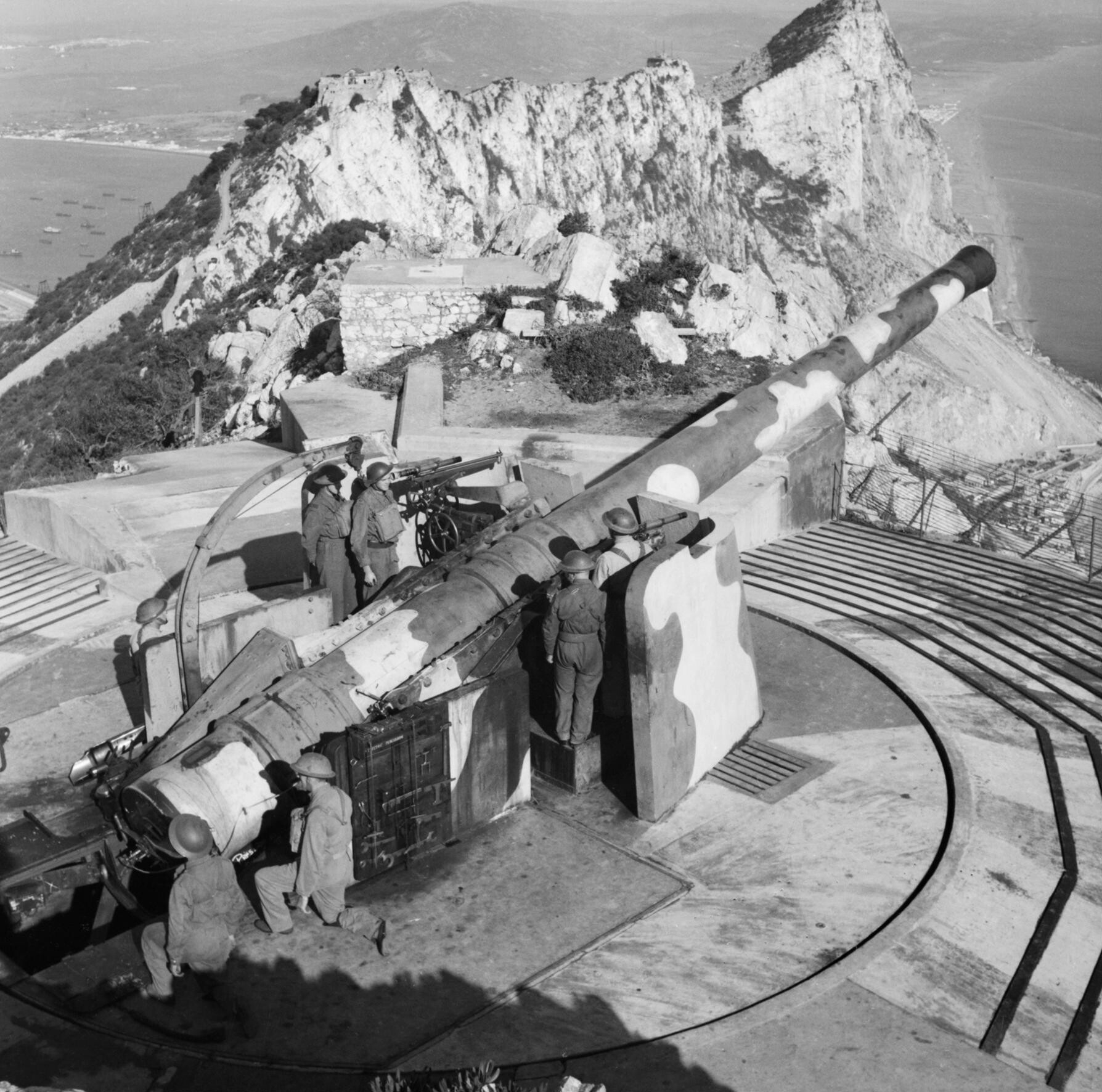
A 9.2 inch gun emplacement on Gibraltar during WW2, the same type of gun was employed at the Braefoot Battery

The Braefoot Battery was equipped with two large calibre naval gun emplacements, designed to engage any large enemy surface vessels threatening ships at anchor in the Firth of Forth and the naval facilities at Rosyth Dockyard. Each gun emplacement housed a BL 9.2-inch Mk IX – X naval gun which could fire a shell weighing 55 kg out to range of 26 km.

The battery was manned by local men of the Territorial Royal Garrison Artillery

The coast guns were such an important part of the defence of the country that considerable efforts were made to protect them from landings of enemy troops that might put them out of action. The battery had a defended perimeter comprising, from inside out, a firing trench, a 10 foot high 'palisade' fence, and a barbed wire entanglement. The barrack building was heavily fortified and the outward facing side contained firing loop holes. The site was also surrounded by a ring of six blockhouses inland and along the shore.

== History ==
According to official records, approval had been given before the war for the construction of a battery of 9.2-inch guns at Braefoot and formal plans were drawn up by the War Office in 1912.

Authority to proceed with construction was given in July 1914 and orders were placed for the guns, carriages and other equipment. Mounting pedestals for the guns arrived at Aberdour Station in January 1915 however they did not reach the battery until May. The two guns were mounted on 28 May and 6 July 1915.

Later in the war the fleet anchorages moved East of the Forth Bridge and consequently the defensive lines were also moved Eastwards. It was suggested that the guns be removed to the battery at Kinghorn, but permission for this was not given. However, in October 1917 the guns were ordered to be dismounted and stored ready for reallocation – with one gun sent to Portsmouth in December.

== Current status ==
Remains of Emplacement B, one of the 9.2 inch gun emplacements at Braefoot Battery, site now overgrown

Today much of the Braefoot Battery remains and can be accessed by the public. The battery site, and the clear view over the River Forth from the gun emplacements, is now obstructed by a post war woodland plantation. Braefoot Plantation is owned by ExxonMobil who operate the adjacent LPG Tanker Terminal but public access is permitted through the Scottish Outdoor Access Code. The location is popular with walkers and a substantial (but unofficial) mountain bike trail has been constructed in the surrounding woodland.

Although the actual guns are now long gone, the gun emplacements and all of the battery buildings are still present (although now bricked up for public safety).

Grid references for surviving battery structures.
Structure	Grid Reference(s)
Gun Emplacements	NT 17877 83404, NT 17905 83439
Magazine and Tramway	NT 17878 83493
Observation Post	NT 17929 83523
Building	NT 17935 83543
Barracks; Workshops	NT 17799 83466
Observation Post	NT 17914 83482
Pier	NT 17710 83128

== See also ==
- Firth of Forth
- Downing Point Battery
- Coastal fortifications in Scotland
- Scheduled monuments in Fife
