= Coastal fortifications in Scotland =

Coastal fortifications in Scotland played a vital role during the World Wars, protecting shipping as they mustered to convoy. New fortifications were built and old defences were also rebuilt or strengthened around the Scottish coast in case of invasion. New technologies like Radar were also deployed.

== First World War (1914-1918) ==
There were over forty seven coastal defence locations in Scotland during the First World War.

=== Ayrshire ===
- Ardeer Battery, Ardeer, North Ayrshire

=== Clyde Defences ===
- Cloch Point To Dunoon Anti-submarine Boom, Firth of Clyde
- Ardhallow Battery, Dunoon, Cowal peninsula, Argyll and Bute
- Dunoon Battery, Castle gardens
- Portkil Battery, Kilcreggan, Roseneath peninsula
- Cloch Point Battery, Gourock, Inverclyde
- Fort Matilda Battery, Greenock, Inverclyde

=== Dee Defences ===
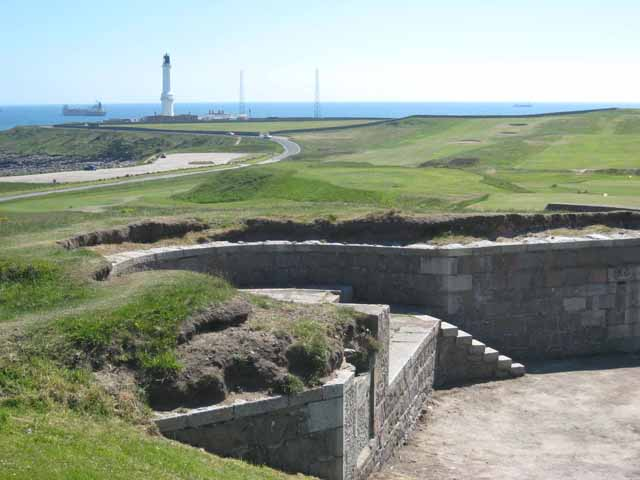
Torry Battery - geograph.org.uk - 840042

- Torry Battery, Aberdeen

=== Forth Defences ===
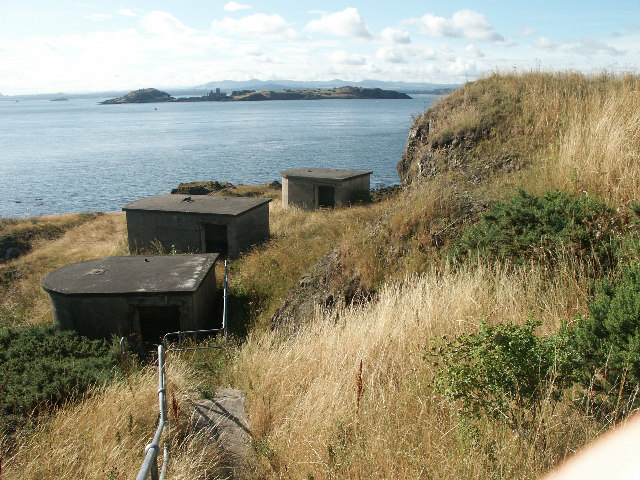
Charles Hill Battery - geograph.org.uk - 42789

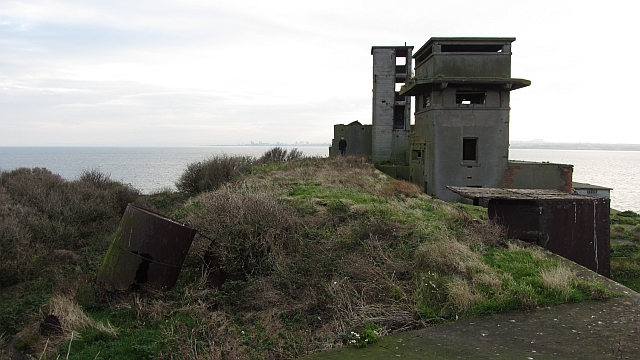
The spine of Inchmickery - geograph.org.uk - 2713491

- Firth of Forth Anti-submarine Booms, Firth of Forth
- Charles Hill Battery, Dalgety Bay, Fife
- Hound Point Battery, South Queensferry, West Lothian
- Leith Docks Battery, Leith, City of Edinburgh
- Braefoot Battery, Dalgety Bay, Fife
- Cramond Island Battery, Cramond Island, Firth of Forth
- Downing Point Battery, Dalgety Bay, Fife
- Inchcolm Battery, Inchcolm Island, Firth of Forth
- Inchmickery Battery, Inchmickery Island, Firth of Forth
- Kinghorn Battery, Kinghorn, Fife
- Pettycur Battery, Kinghorn, Fife

=== Highland ===
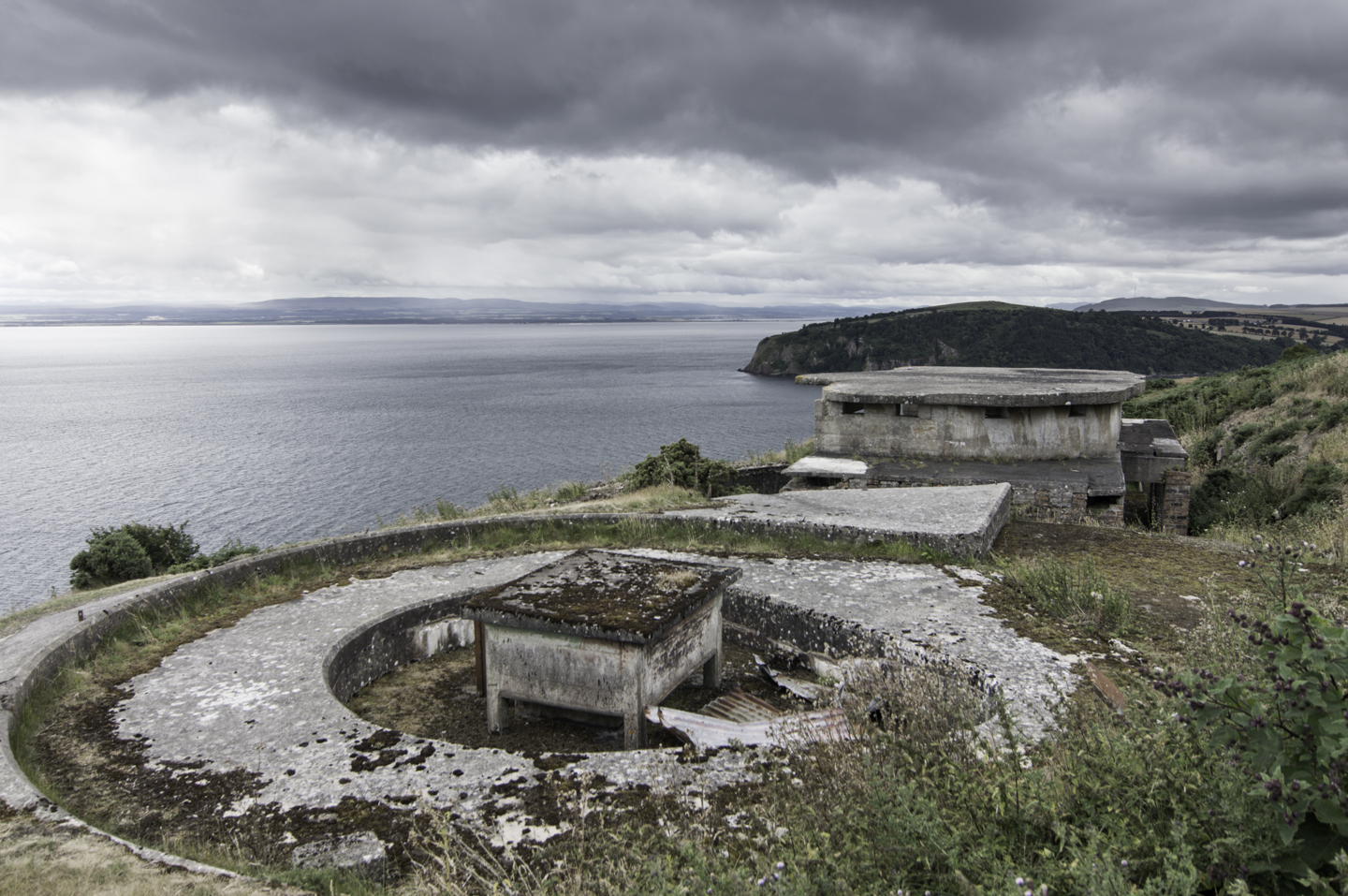
North Sutor Battery - geograph.org.uk - 4094816

==== Easter Ross ====
- Cromarty Firth Anti-submarine Boom, Cromarty Firth
- North Sutor Battery, Cromarty Firth
- South Sutor Battery, Cromarty Firth

=== Orkney ===
- Scapa Flow Anti-submarine Booms, Scapa Flow
- Ness Battery, Stromness, Scapa Flow
- Innan Neb Battery, Flotta Island

=== Shetland ===
- Score Hill Battery, Bressay Island
- The Knab Battery, Lerwick

=== Tay Defences ===
- Broughty Castle Battery, Broughty Ferry

== Second World War (1939-1945) ==
Many of the First World War coastal fortifications were reused in the Second World War. These defences listed below, were newly built for the Second World War.

=== Clyde Defences ===
- Toward Battery, Toward, Cowal peninsula, Argyll and Bute

=== Fife ===
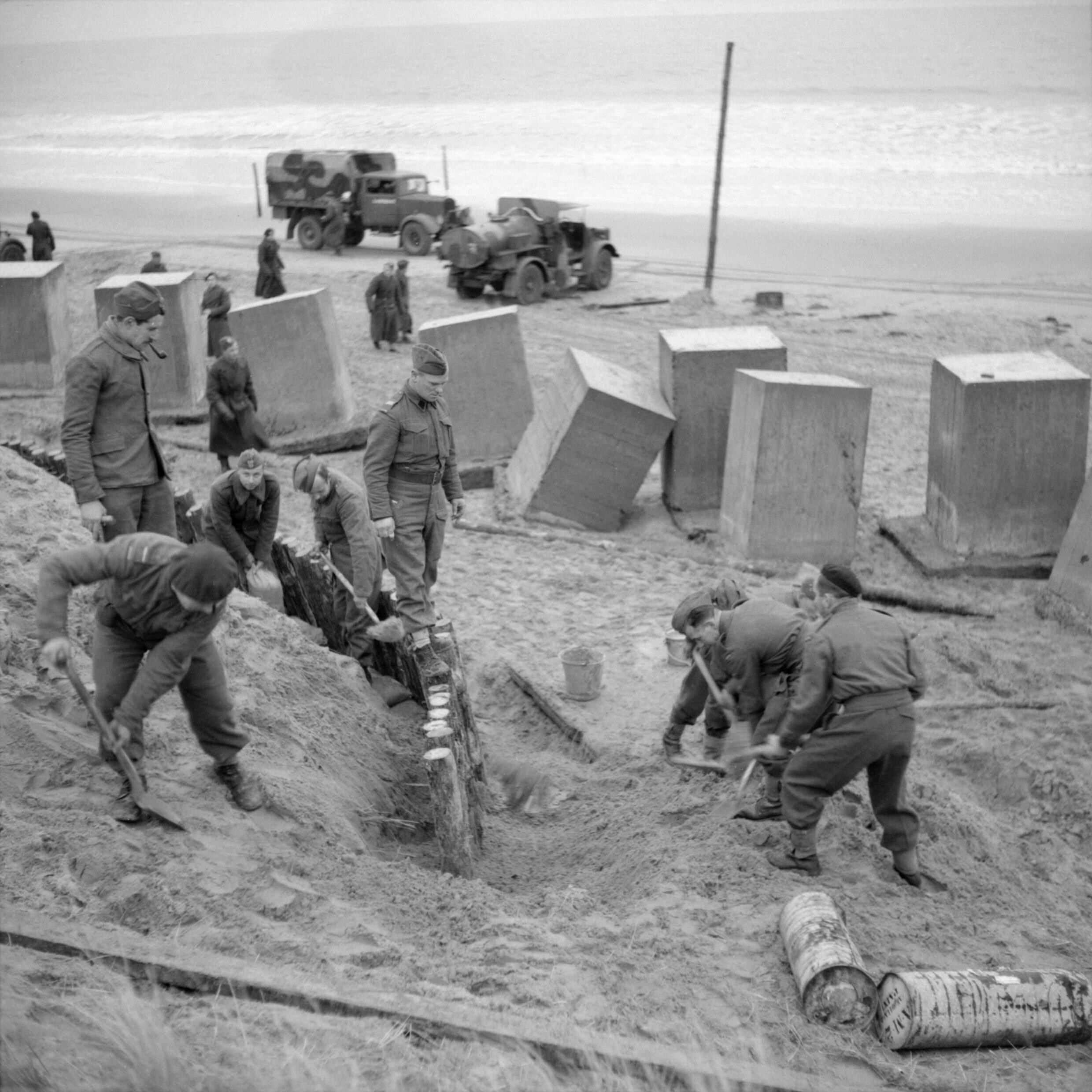
Constructing beach defences at Tentsmuir H5493

- Tentsmuir coastal defences, Tayport
- Roseisle WWII defences, Roseisle Beach, Kinghorn

=== Highland ===
==== Wester Ross ====
- Cove Battery, Loch Ewe

=== Orkney ===
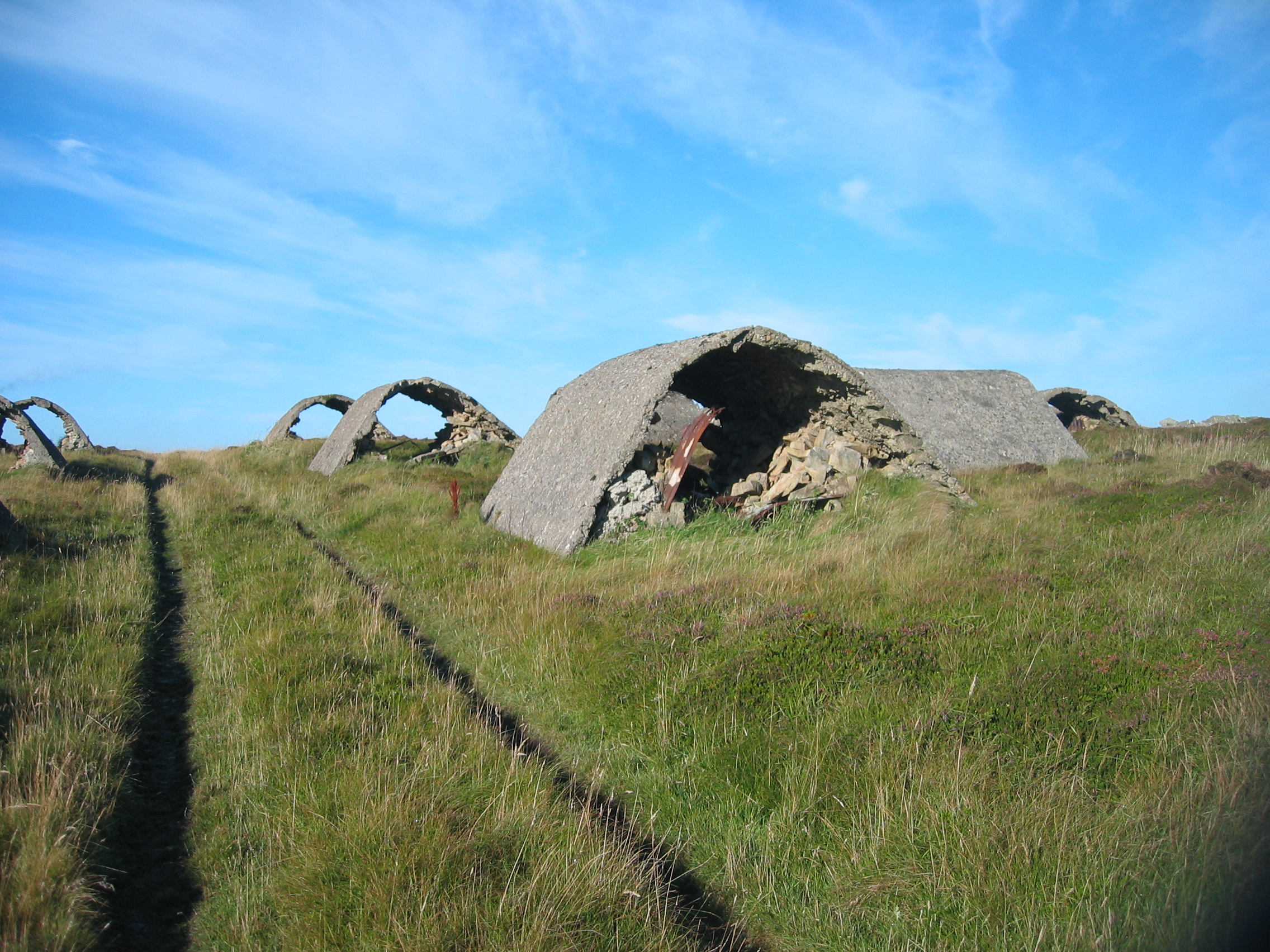
Rocket Silos (geograph 2297457)

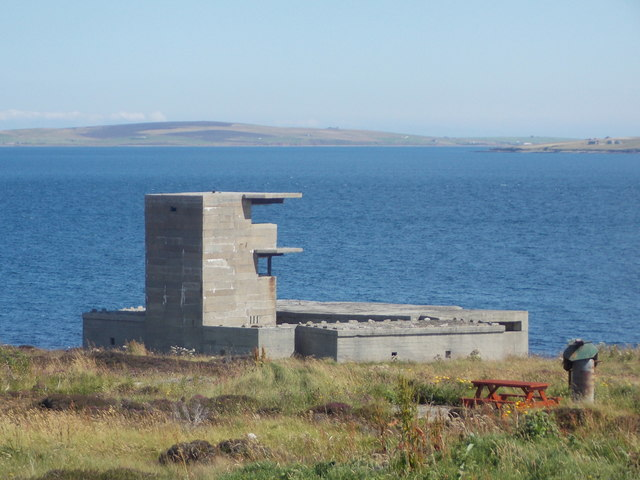
Flotta, Buchanan Battery - geograph.org.uk - 4714877

- Churchhill Barriers
- The Buchanan Battery, Flotta Island
- Gate battery, Flotta Island
- Neb Battery, Flotta Island
- Golta Z Battery, Roan Head, Flotta Island
- Balfour Battery, South Ronaldsay

=== Shetland ===
- Hill of Setter Battery, Bressay Island
- Ness of Sound Battery, Yell Island

=== Tay Defences ===
- Stannergate Battery, Dundee

== Chain Home Low ==
Chain Home Low (CHL), a new aircraft detection and tracking system, Radar, operated by the Royal Air Force during the Second World War. There were about thirty coastal stations around the coast of Scotland.

=== Aberdeenshire ===
- St Cyrus Station (CHL), St Cyrus, Aberdeenshire
- Rosehearty Station (CHL), Rosehearty

=== Highlands ===
- Leirinbeg Station (CHL), Leirinmore, Highland
- Wick Station (CHL), Wick

==== Wester Ross ====
- Point Of Stoer Station (CHL), Assynt, Wester Ross

==== Easter Ross ====
- Cromarty Station (CHL), South Sutor, Cromarty, Easter Ross

=== Fife ===
- Anstruther Station (CHL), Anstruther, Fife

=== Orkney Islands ===
- Crustan Station (CHL), Orkney Islands
- Deerness Station (CHL), Deerness
- South Ronaldsay Station (CHL), South Ronaldsay
- Sanday Station (CHL), Sanday

=== Scottish Borders ===
- Lamberton Station (CHL), Lamberton, Scottish Borders
- Coldingham Station (CHL), Coldingham
- Cockburnspath Station (CHL), Cockburnspath

=== Shetland Islands ===
- Skaw Station (CHL), Unst, Shetland Islands
- Noss Hill Station (CHL), Shetland Islands
- Wats Ness Station (CHL), Shetland Islands
- Compass Head, Grutness Station (CHL), Sumburgh, Shetland Islands
- Ward Hill Station (CHL), Fair Isle

=== West Coast Islands ===
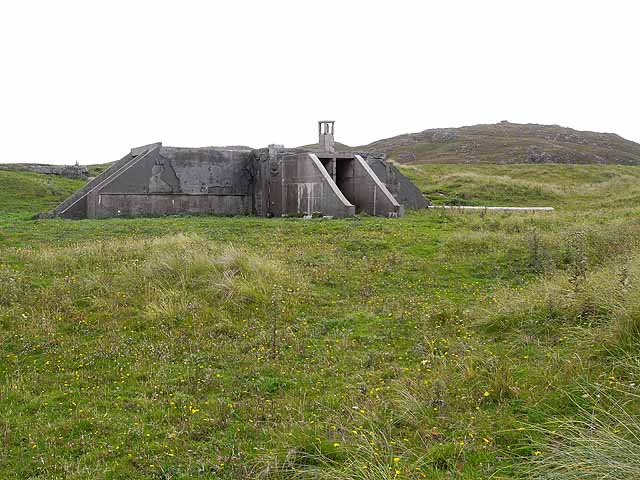
World War II The old radar station, Tiree - geograph.org.uk - 1458870

- Tiree Station (CHL), Tiree
- Islay Station (CHL), Islay
- Harris Station (CHL), Harris
- Barra Station (CHL), Barra
- Eorodale, Lewis (CHL), Lewis
- Islibhig, Lewis (CHL), Lewis
- Skye Station (CHL), Skye

== Coastal Defence U-Boat ==
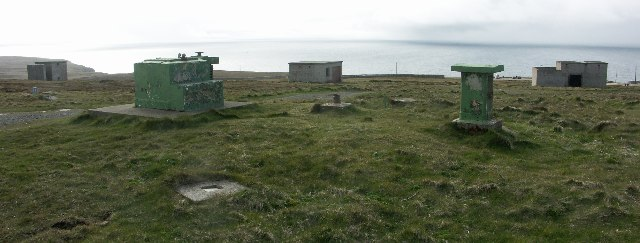
Dunnet Head - geograph.org.uk - 14728

Coastal Defence U-Boat (CDU). A new experimental system, Radar, for submarine detection and tracking. First introduced in the Second World War. There were six experimental stations, two located on Fair Isle.

- Ward Hill, Radar Station (CDU), Fair Isle, Fair Isle
- Dunnet Head, Radar Station (CDU), Dunnet Head, Wick, Highland
- Ward Hill, Radar Station (CDU), South Ronaldsay, South Ronaldsay, Orkney Islands
- Saxa Vord Radar Station (CDU), Unst, Shetland Islands
- Sumburgh, Radar Station (CDU), Sumburgh, Shetland Islands

== See also ==
- British anti-invasion preparations of the Second World War
- Palmerston Forts
- Anti-submarine net
- Naval warfare of World War I
- Naval history of World War II
- RAF Coastal Command during World War II
- Z Battery
- Anti-aircraft warfare
- Chain Home Low
- U-boat
- Radar
