= Ness Battery =

- Stromness, Orkney
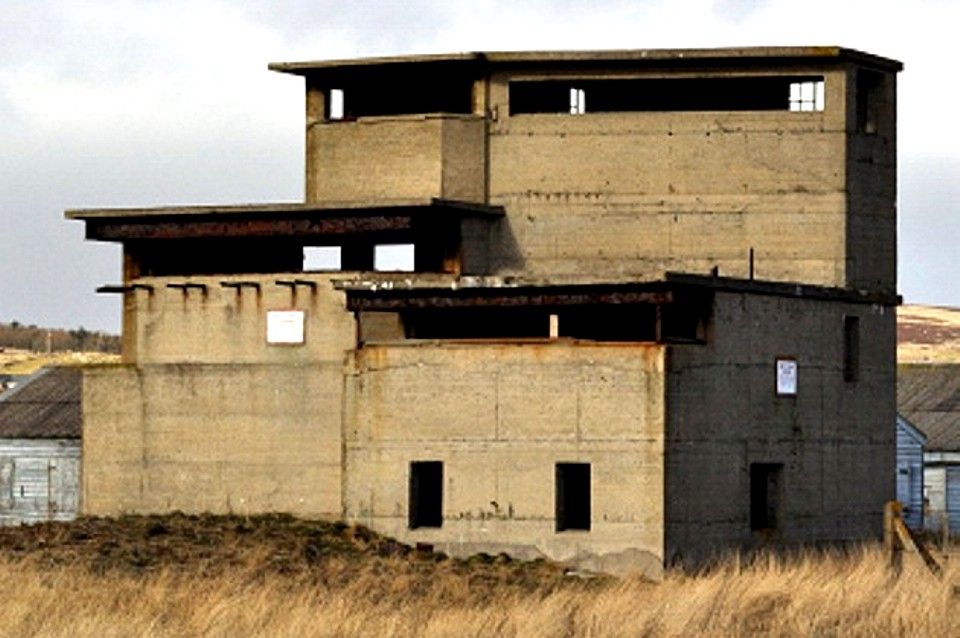
- Ness Battery B.O.P. (Battery Observation Post) in January 2012.

Site information
- Type: Coastal Artillery Battery
- Owner: Ministry of Defence (1914–2001); Orkney Islands Council (2001–present)
- Operator: British Army

Site history
- Built: 1914
- Built for: War Office
- In use: 1914–2001 (artillery battery); 2012–present (museum)

Ness Battery is a coastal defence battery in Stromness, Orkney. It was a crucial element of the defences of the western entrance to Scapa Flow, in the Orkney Islands, Scotland, the main fleet base for the Royal Navy in both World Wars. Several of the original wooden huts which formed the accommodation camp are still intact, and in one of these is a painted mural covering three walls, depicting rural English scenes. An extensive programme of stabilisation and renovation took place from 2009, and was completed in 2012, and the site is now open for guided tours.

Scapa Flow

== First World War ==
In the First World War, Ness Battery was one of three batteries covering the Hoy Mouth from the north side. In 1915 the three batteries were equipped with guns manufactured in the United States and manned by a mixture of Royal Marines and local men of the Orkney Royal Garrison Artillery. After the war, the batteries were dismantled and the guns scrapped, but traces of the battery are still to be seen today.

== Second World War ==
In the Second World War, the site became a coast defence battery once more, and Ness Battery also became the headquarters of Orkney's Fixed Defences. It housed a Fire Command, controlling several other gun batteries around the harbour entrance. The battery's main purpose was to defend the Fleet anchorage from enemy attack, but it also had the role of Examination Battery, supporting the Royal Navy's Examination Service, which controlled the traffic in and out of Hoy Sound. The battery's main armament was a pair of breech loading Mk VII 6-inch guns on CP II mountings.

== Post-War ==
The guns remained at Ness Battery until 1955, and the site was used for many years by the Territorial Army. The site was sold by the Ministry of Defence to Orkney Islands Council in 2001.

== See also ==
- Coastal fortifications in Scotland
