= Altmayer =

Altmayer is a surname. Notable people with the surname include:

- Éric and Nicolas Altmayer, French film producers
- René Altmayer (1882–1976), French general
- Robert Altmayer (1875–1959), French army corps general
- Victor Joseph Altmayer (1844–1908), French general

== See also ==
- Altmeyer, people with this surname
- Altmaier (surname), people with this surname
- Peter Altmeier
