= General Altmayer =

General Altmayer may refer to:

- René Altmayer (1882–1976), French Army general
- Robert Altmayer (1875–1959), French Army general
- Victor Joseph Altmayer (1844–1908), French Army general
