= List of British divisions in World War II =

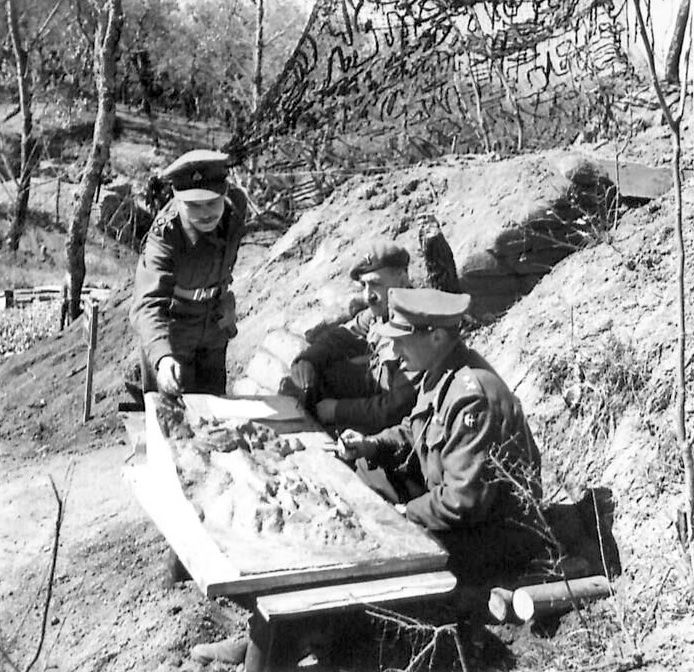
During the Second World War, British divisions were commanded by major-generals. Here Major-General Charles Keightley (on right), the commanding officer of the 78th Infantry Division, plans his division's next steps during the Battle of Monte Cassino, Italy, April 1944.

During the Second World War, the basic tactical formation used by the majority of combatants was the division. It was a self-contained formation that possessed all the required forces for combat, which was supplemented by its own artillery, engineers, communications and supply units. On 3 September 1939, at the start of the war, the United Kingdom had 2 armoured, 24 infantry and 7 anti-aircraft divisions. The anti-aircraft divisions were not comparable in role to formations that were intended for combat such as infantry divisions. In September, the British Army stated that 55 divisions (a mix of armoured, infantry and cavalry) would be raised to combat Germany. The UK would provide 32 of these formations and the remainder would be raised by the Dominions and India.

In 1941, this goal was adjusted to 57 divisions, with the UK to provide 36. By the end of 1941, the UK had met its quota. Over the course of the war, 85 divisional formations were raised although they did not all exist simultaneously and not all of them were combat formations. For example, the 12th Division (SDF) was raised to protect the lines of communication behind fighting formations. Several divisions were created when a division of one type was converted into another, for example the 42nd (East Lancashire) Infantry Division was converted into the 42nd Armoured Division. Others, such as the 79th Armoured Division, were not intended to act as a fighting formation. Instead, it acted in an administrative capacity for dispersed units that were engaged in combat. The 85 divisional formations included 2 airborne, 12 anti-aircraft, 11 armoured, 1 cavalry, 10 coastal defence (known as County Divisions) and 49 infantry divisions. At the end of the war, in 1945, the British Army had 24 divisions.

== Background ==
During the interwar period, the British Army was split into two branches: the regular army, which numbered 224,000 men with a reserve of 173,700 at the start of the war, and the part-time Territorial Army that numbered 438,100 with a reserve of around 20,750 men. The main goal of the regular army, largely built around battalion-sized formations, was to police and garrison the British Empire. The basic tactical formation among the major militaries was the division. These were self-contained formations that possessed all the required forces needed for combat. This included its own artillery, engineers, communications, and supply units. The provision of a multi-division expeditionary force, for a war on the continent against a European adversary, was not considered for much of the interwar period by the British government which deemed it unlikely for such a war to occur. (Note: In August 1919, the British government adopted the Ten Year Rule. This policy held that war would be unlikely over the following decade and there would be little need for an expeditionary force. The rule was abolished in 1932 and was adopted while the British military was being cut and the government sought to reduce expenditures.)

In 1939, the regular army consisted of seven infantry and two armoured divisions. Two of the infantry divisions had been formed for the repression of the 1936–1939 Arab revolt in Palestine. The Territorial Army was intended to be the primary method of expanding the number of divisions available to the army. During the interwar period, the British government reduced the funding and size of the Territorial Army. By 1936, they had concluded that it could not be modernised or equipped for a European war over the following three-year period and therefore delayed further funding. At the beginning of 1939, the Territorial Army had twelve infantry divisions. Following the German occupation of the remnants of the Czechoslovak state in March 1939, the Territorial Army was ordered to double in size to 24 divisions. By the outbreak of the Second World War, in September 1939, some of these divisions had formed while others were being created.

On 8 September 1939, the British Army announced that it would raise 55 divisions to be deployed to France, as part of the British Expeditionary Force (BEF), for service against Germany. Thirty-two of these formations were to come from the British Army, and rest from the armies of the British Dominions (for example, the Canadian Army) and the British Indian Army. The goal was to fully equip and deploy 20 divisions within the first year of the war and all 55 divisions within two years. The British contingent was to come from the expanded Territorial Army and the regular army divisions based in the UK. By May 1940, the BEF contained only 13 divisions. During the latter stages of the campaign, the Beauman Division was raised ad hoc from rear-area personnel. As a result of defeat in the Battle of France and the return of the BEF following the Dunkirk evacuation, the original deployment of divisions was not realised. The 51st (Highland) Infantry Division was lost during the Battle of France and it was later reformed by renaming the 9th (Highland) Infantry Division. After the BEF returned to the UK, four infantry divisions were disbanded to reinforce other formations. Colonial regiments in Britain's African colonies, including the Nigeria Regiment, Gold Coast Regiment and King's African Rifles were expanded in size via new recruitment efforts. This resulted in two new divisions being formed in Africa in mid-1940.

The goal of 55 divisions was increased to 58 in January 1941, then cut to 57 on 6 March; the UK was to provide 36 of these. During 1941, the 2nd Armoured Division in North Africa was overrun, and its headquarters captured. By the end of the year, the British Army had 37 active divisions (one airborne, nine armoured and 27 infantry). On 15 February 1942, the 18th Infantry Division was captured by Japanese forces following the Battle of Singapore. Lack of equipment hindered growth and an increasing number of divisions based in the UK were reduced in size to provide men for formations fighting abroad. By 1943, it became necessary for front line divisions to be cannibalised to provide reinforcements for other formations. During 1943, three new divisions were formed after the further expansion of the African regiments. By 1944, the UK still had 35 divisions, of which 18 were for training or to be used as a pool for reinforcements. By mid-1944, the army did not have enough men to replace the losses suffered by front line infantry units. Transfers of men from the Royal Artillery and the Royal Air Force to be retrained as infantry took place, and more formations were disbanded to provide the required reinforcements. By the end of 1944, the army had shrunk to 26 divisions: 5 armoured and 21 infantry (including airborne). In the final year of the war, the number decreased to 24 divisions.

== Airborne ==
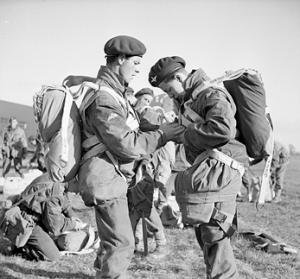
British parachutists during training in 1944

Impressed by the German airborne force during the 1940 Battle of France, the British Prime Minister, Winston Churchill, ordered the creation of a paratrooper force of 5,000 men. The qualified success of Operation Colossus, a small scale commando raid, prompted further expansion of this force, and resulted in an additional requirement for a glider force of 10,000 men to be created. The recruitment for the size of this force took until 1943, by which time two divisions had been formed. The airborne division was to comprise three brigades: two parachute brigades, each with three battalions from the Parachute Regiment, and an "airlanding" brigade of three infantry battalions carried into battle by gliders.The first parachute battalions were formed from volunteers from across the British military. As the airborne force grew, infantry battalions were selected to be converted into parachute battalions. The men were invited to volunteer for parachute service, or assigned to a new unit. The new battalions were then brought up to strength from volunteers from other units. The airlanding battalions came from existing infantry units that were converted to glider infantry, and the soldiers did not have the ability to opt-out.

The war establishment, the on-paper strength, was set at 12,148 men, with a large number of automatic weapons assigned to the division. The establishment called for 7,171 bolt-action Lee Enfield rifles, 6,504 Sten submachine guns, 966 Bren light machine guns, and 46 Vickers medium machine guns. Each division was also expected to have 392 PIAT anti-tank weapons, 525 mortars, 100 anti-tank guns, and twenty-seven 75 mm (3.0 in) M116 pack howitzers. Just over 6,000 vehicles—primarily jeeps, motorcycles, and bicycles, but also including 22 Tetrarch light tanks—were authorised for each division. Gliders delivered the heavier equipment.

Airborne divisions
Formation name	Date formed	Date formation ceased to exist	Divisional insignia	Locations served	Notable campaigns	Notes	Source(s)
1st Airborne Division	1 November 1941	1945 (Note: The British Army's website stated that the division was disbanded on 26 August 1945, prior to the Surrender of Japan and the end of the war. Other sources state that the division was disbanded on 15 November 1945, following the end of the war.)		UK, Tunisia, Italy, Netherlands, Norway	Tunisian, Italian, Operation Market Garden	The division did not reach full strength until April 1943. After heavy losses in the battle of Arnhem, the division was reduced from three to two brigades. Following the German surrender it was sent to Norway to maintain order. It returned to England in August 1945, prior to the end of the war.	
6th Airborne Division	3 May 1943	N/A		UK, France, Germany	Normandy, Operation Varsity, Western Allied invasion of Germany	The division ended the war in Germany.	

== Anti-aircraft ==
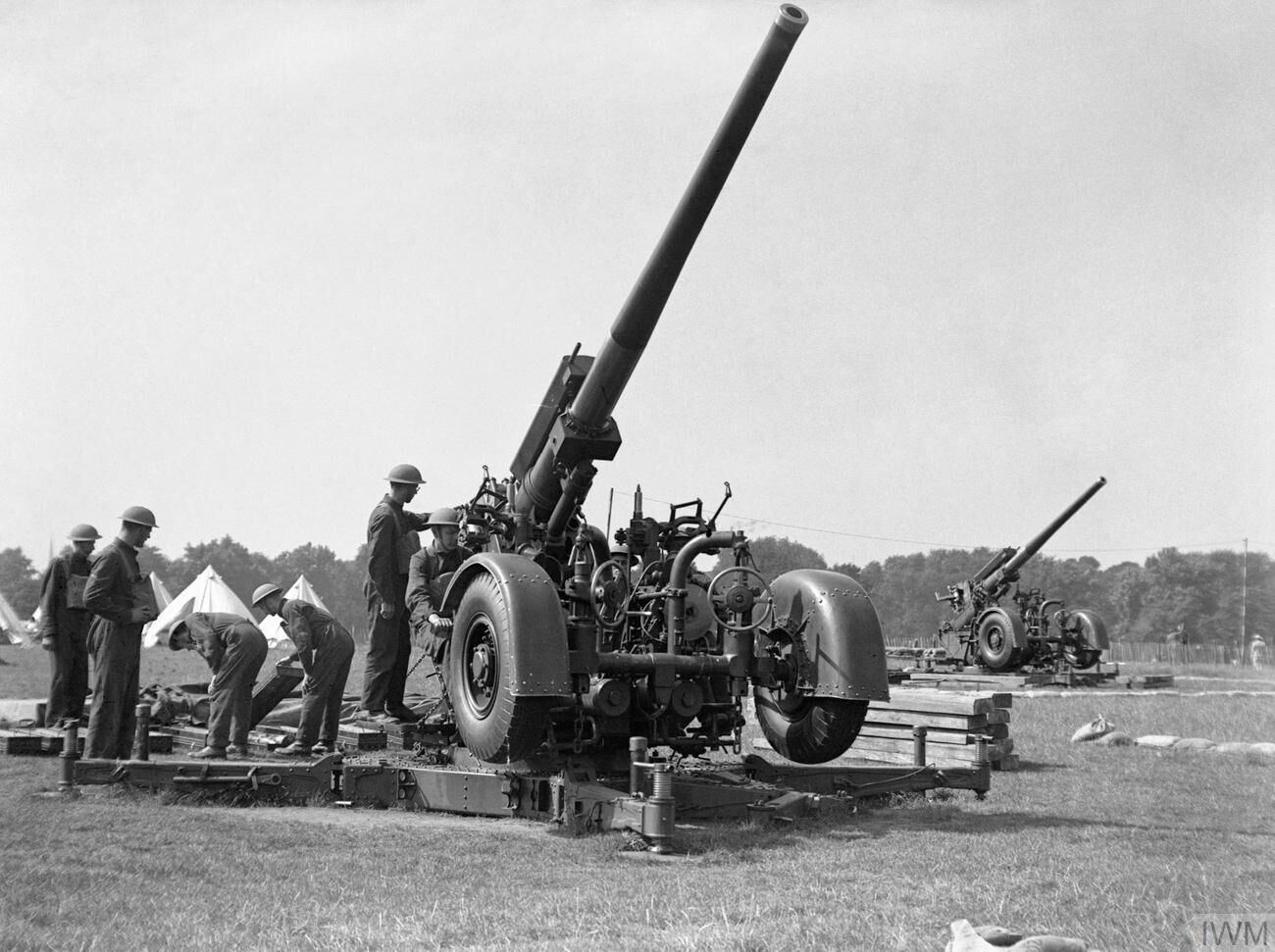
A 3.7-inch heavy anti-aircraft gun battery set up in central London

Between 1935 and the start of the war, the British Army formed anti-aircraft divisions. These formations were part of the Territorial Army, and were not intended to be comparable to other formations such as infantry divisions. The anti-aircraft divisions were assigned to a particular area, which could cover hundreds or thousands of square miles. They varied dramatically in manpower, the number of brigades controlled, and the number of weapons assigned. For example, the 1st Anti-Aircraft Division was assigned to defend London, while the 3rd Anti-Aircraft Division was assigned to defend both Scotland and Northern Ireland. In September 1939, Anti-Aircraft Command's seven divisions had a combined total of 695 heavy anti-aircraft guns compared to an intended 2,232, and 253 light anti-aircraft guns out of an establishment of 1,200. The divisions also had access to 2,700 searchlights, out of a recommended total of 4,700. By 1941, the divisions had 1,691 heavy guns, 940 light guns, and 4,532 searchlights. At the start of the war, the divisions and their command structure had a total of 106,690 men; manpower increased to 157,319 by July 1940, and was over 300,000 by mid-1941. All of the divisions were disbanded in October 1942 as part of a reorganisation of the anti-aircraft command structure. The divisions were replaced by seven groups, which were intended to reduce the overall number of formations, save manpower, and be more flexible.

Anti-aircraft divisions
Formation name	Existing formation or date created	Date formation ceased to exist	Divisional insignia	Locations served	Notable campaigns	Source(s)
1st Anti-Aircraft Division	Existing	October 1942		UK	Battle of Britain, The Blitz	
2nd Anti-Aircraft Division	Existing	October 1942		UK	Battle of Britain, The Blitz	
3rd Anti-Aircraft Division	Existing	October 1942		UK	Battle of Britain, The Blitz	
4th Anti-Aircraft Division	Existing	October 1942		UK	Battle of Britain, The Blitz	(Note: The division's initial insignia is displayed)
5th Anti-Aircraft Division	Existing	October 1942		UK	Battle of Britain, The Blitz	
6th Anti-Aircraft Division	Existing	October 1942		UK	Battle of Britain, The Blitz	
7th Anti-Aircraft Division	Existing	October 1942		UK	Battle of Britain, The Blitz	
8th Anti-Aircraft Division	October 1940	October 1942		UK	The Blitz	
9th Anti-Aircraft Division	October 1940	October 1942		UK	The Blitz	
10th Anti-Aircraft Division	November 1940	October 1942		UK	The Blitz	
11th Anti-Aircraft Division	November 1940	October 1942		UK	The Blitz	
12th Anti-Aircraft Division	November 1940	October 1942		UK	The Blitz	

== Armoured ==
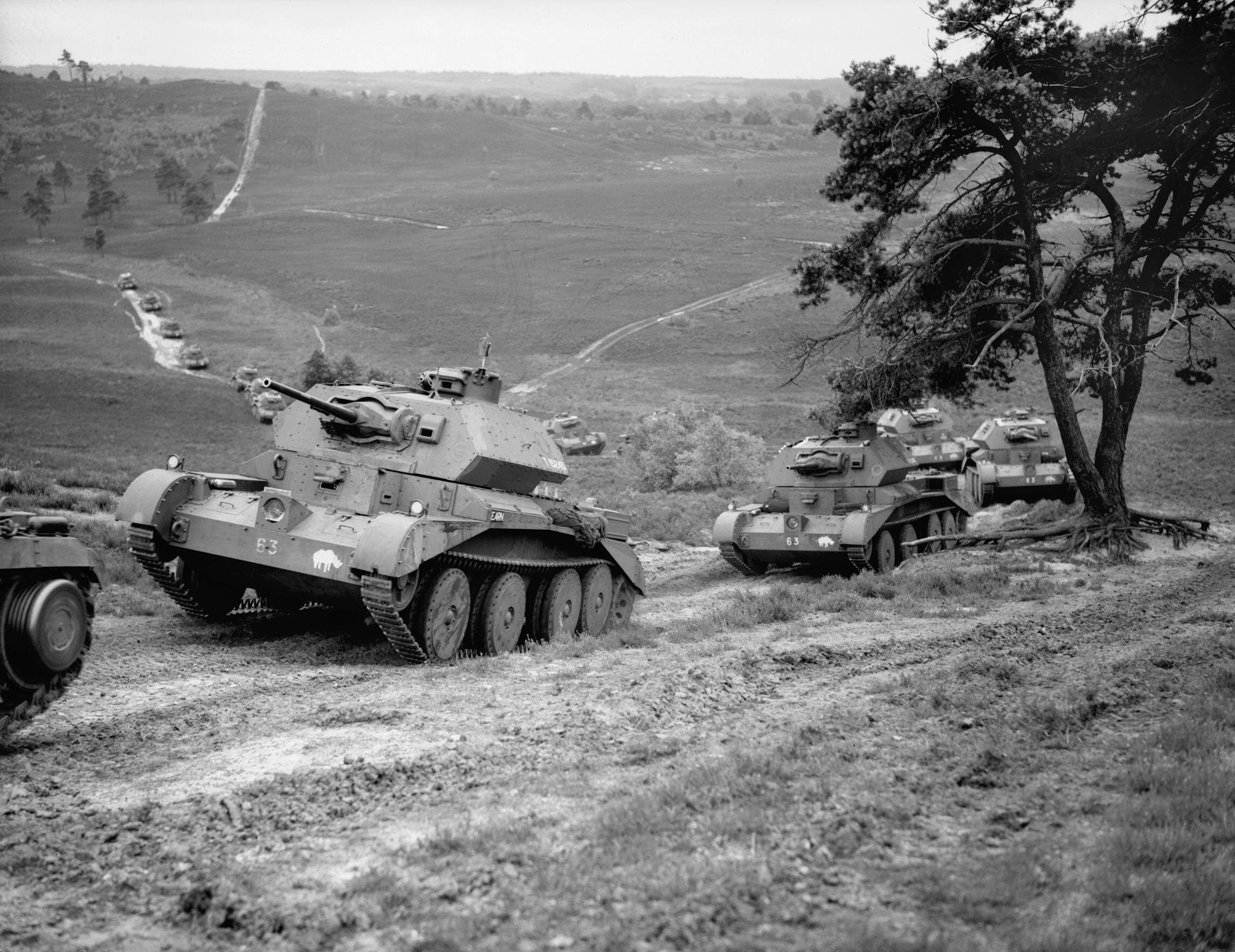
Cruiser Mk IV tank of the 1st Armoured Division on manoeuvres, 1940

Between May 1939 and the end of the Second World War, the armoured division went through nine organisational changes. In 1939, it was intended that an armoured division would have 110 light tanks, 217 cruiser tanks, and 24 cruiser tanks equipped with howitzers for close support, as well as 2,500 other vehicles, 9,442 men, and 16 field guns. (Note: Generally, two close support tanks were issued to each tank squadron. The early war cruiser tanks, which were equipped with a 3.7 in (9.4 cm) howitzer, were only capable of firing smoke rounds. The various close support tanks that were outfitted with the 3 in (7.6 cm) howitzer, were able to fire smoke and high explosive rounds.) In 1940, the establishment was changed to two light tanks, 304 cruisers, and 36 close support tanks, with 2,600 vehicles, and 10,750 men. The early armoured formations did not reach these proposed tank strengths. For example, the 1st Armoured Division landed in France, in 1940, with 114 light tanks and 143 cruisers. The 2nd Armoured Division, prior to being deployed to the Middle East in late 1940, peaked at a strength of 256 light tanks and 54 cruisers. By 1942, a division was to consist of 13,235 men with 230 tanks, of which 183 would be cruisers and the rest would be for support, along with around 3,000 other vehicles and 48 field guns. For the final two years of the war, the establishment was set at 14,964 men, 246 medium tanks, 63 light tanks, 27 tanks Crusader self-propelled anti-aircraft guns, 27 tanks that were outfitted as artillery observation posts, 24 field guns, 24 self-propelled field guns, 54 anti-tank guns, and 24 self-propelled anti-tank guns. In July 1944, for example, the Guards, the 7th, and the 11th Armoured Divisions all averaged 250 medium tanks. The Guards had 15,600 men, the 7th had 15,100, and the 11th had 14,400.

The early organisation of the armoured divisions included two armoured brigades (with a total of six armoured regiments) and one support group of two infantry battalions, combat engineers and artillery. The intent of the division was to exploit gaps in the opposing frontline created by the infantry divisions. The armoured divisions were considered 'tank-heavy', due to the lack of infantry support to guard the tanks. It took repeated setbacks during the Western Desert campaign before a major reorganisation took place. By 1942, the division had evolved to be based around one armoured brigade containing three armoured regiments and one motorised infantry battalion, the support group was replaced by a three-battalion infantry brigade, and additional support weapons were allocated as divisional assets. However, doctrine still dictated for the artillery, infantry, and tanks to fight separate battles. The artillery would engage opposing anti-tank guns; the infantry would secure captured ground or provide flank protection in confined terrain; and the tanks would move ahead to destroy enemy tanks and disrupt the opposing lines of communication. The division, rather than exploiting gaps, would find itself increasingly being used a battering ram to break through the enemy frontline. The armoured divisions diverged in how they were organised between those that were deployed to Northwest Europe in June 1944, and those operating in Italy. In Italy, the division's reconnaissance regiments were equipped with armoured cars, whereas the reconnaissance regiments of those assigned to fight in Northwest Europe were primarily equipped with Cromwell tanks. In Italy, starting in June 1944, the infantry component was increased with a second infantry brigade that was either integrated or attached on an as needed basis. The divisions assigned to Northwest Europe did not have this increased infantry, and it took further setbacks before military planners decided that the tanks and infantry needed to work more closely together. Starting in July 1944, an armoured regiment (including the reconnaissance regiment) was paired with one of the division's infantry battalions (three from the infantry brigade, and one motorised infantry battalion assigned to the armoured brigade) to implement this change, although on paper they maintained the existing separate brigade structure.

Armoured divisions
Formation name	Existing formation or date created	Date formation ceased to exist	Divisional insignia	Locations served	Notable campaigns	Notes	Source(s)
Guards Armoured Division	17 June 1941	12 June 1945		UK, France, Belgium, Netherlands, Germany	Normandy, Allied advance from Paris to the Rhine, Operation Market Garden, Western Allied invasion of Germany	The division was reorganised as the Guards Division on 12 June 1945.	
1st Armoured Division	Existing	11 January 1945		UK, France, Egypt, Italian-Libya, Tunisia, Italy	Battle of France, Western Desert, Tunisian, Italian	On 5 April 1943, the division was redesignated as the 1st British Armoured Division, to distinguish it from its American counterpart. On 26 October 1944, the division ceased to be an operational formation before it was disbanded on 11 January 1945.	
2nd Armoured Division	15 December 1939	10 May 1941		UK, Egypt, Italian-Libya	Western Desert	On 8 April 1941, the divisional headquarters was captured during an Axis offensive. The surviving units were reassigned, and the division was officially disbanded on 10 May 1941.	
6th Armoured Division	12 September 1940	N/A		UK, Tunisia, Italy, Austria	Tunisian, Italian	The division ended the war in Austria.	
7th Armoured Division	Existing	N/A		Egypt, Italian-Libya, Tunisia, Italy, UK, France, Belgium, Netherlands, Germany	Western Desert, Tunisian, Italian, Normandy, Allied advance from Paris to the Rhine, Western Allied invasion of Germany	On the outbreak of the Second World War, the division was redesignated from the Mobile Division to the Armoured Division (Egypt); on 16 February 1940, it became the 7th Armoured Division. It ended the war in Germany. The division's insignia used during the final two years of the war is shown.	
8th Armoured Division	4 November 1940	1 January 1943		UK, Egypt	did not see combat as a division	After arriving in Egypt, the division never operated as a single entity. The divisional headquarters and elements of the divisional troops took part in the Second Battle of El Alamein. The division was disbanded on 1 January 1943 in Egypt, so that its forces could be dispersed to other formations to ensure they stayed up to strength.	
9th Armoured Division	1 December 1940	31 July 1944		UK	did not see combat	The division was disbanded on 31 July 1944.	
10th Armoured Division	1 August 1941	15 June 1944		Palestine, Egypt, Syria	Western Desert	The division was formed by the redesignation and reorganisation of the 1st Cavalry Division. It was disbanded in Egypt on 15 June 1944.	
11th Armoured Division	9 March 1941	N/A		UK, France, Belgium, Netherlands, Germany	Normandy, Allied advance from Paris to the Rhine, Western Allied invasion of Germany	The division ended the war in Germany.	
42nd Armoured Division	1 November 1941	17 October 1943		UK	did not see combat	The division was formed from the reorganisation of the 42nd (East Lancashire) Infantry Division. It was disbanded on 17 October 1943.	
79th Armoured Division	14 August 1942	N/A		UK, France, Belgium, Netherlands, Germany	Was not intended to act as single entity. The division's units saw combat in Operation Overlord and the Western Allied invasion of Germany.	In April 1943, the division was tasked with the development of specialised tanks ("Hobart's Funnies") and their usage. The division deployed to France as part of Operation Overlord, where its units were allotted to other formations as needed while the division retained command and administrative control. It ended the war in Germany.	

== Cavalry ==
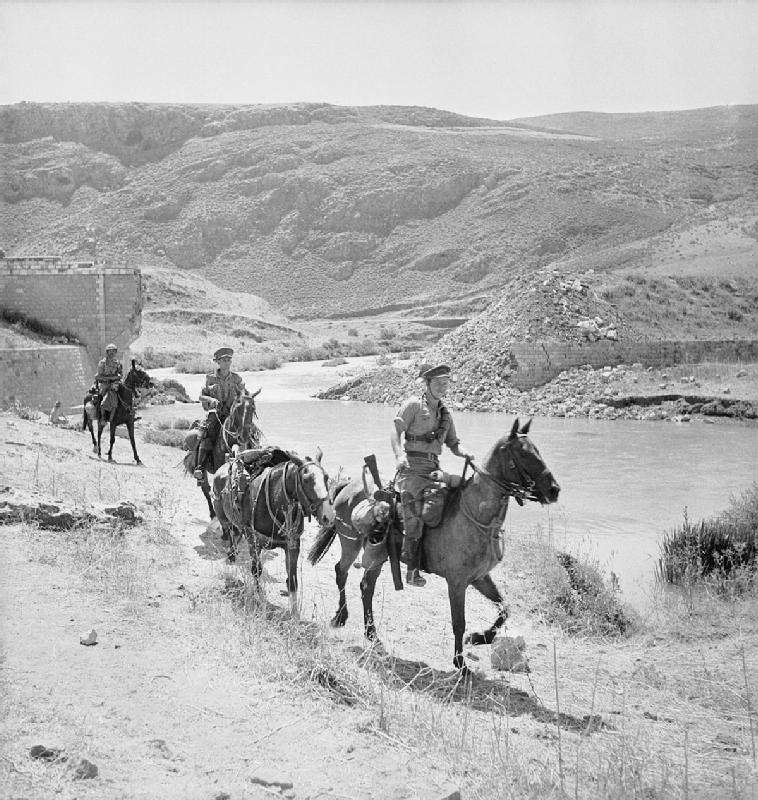
Elements of the division on patrol, 1941

Prior to the outbreak of the war, the British military promised their French counterparts that the BEF would contain at least one cavalry division that would be dispatched within six months of the outbreak of the war. The division would be formed following the start of hostilities, by Territorial Army regiments that would coalesce. The war establishment was set at 11,097 men, 6,081 horses, and 1,815 vehicles distributed between three brigades, each containing three cavalry regiments. The division was primarily equipped with rifles, and supported by 203 light machine guns, 36 medium machine guns, and 48 field guns. For anti-tank protection, the establishment called for 247 anti-tank rifles. As the only division type to include horses, it was required to have three mobile sections from the Royal Army Veterinary Corps. Doctrine called for the division to be mounted infantry: moving from place to place on horseback, and then dismounting to engage opposing forces.

Cavalry divisions
Formation name	Date formed	Date formation ceased to exist	Divisional insignia	Locations served	Notable campaigns	Notes	Source(s)
1st Cavalry Division	31 October 1939	1 August 1941	N/A	UK, France, Palestine, Transjordan, Iraq, Syria	did not see combat as a division	On 1 August 1941, the division was redesignated and reorganised as the 10th Armoured Division.	

== County ==
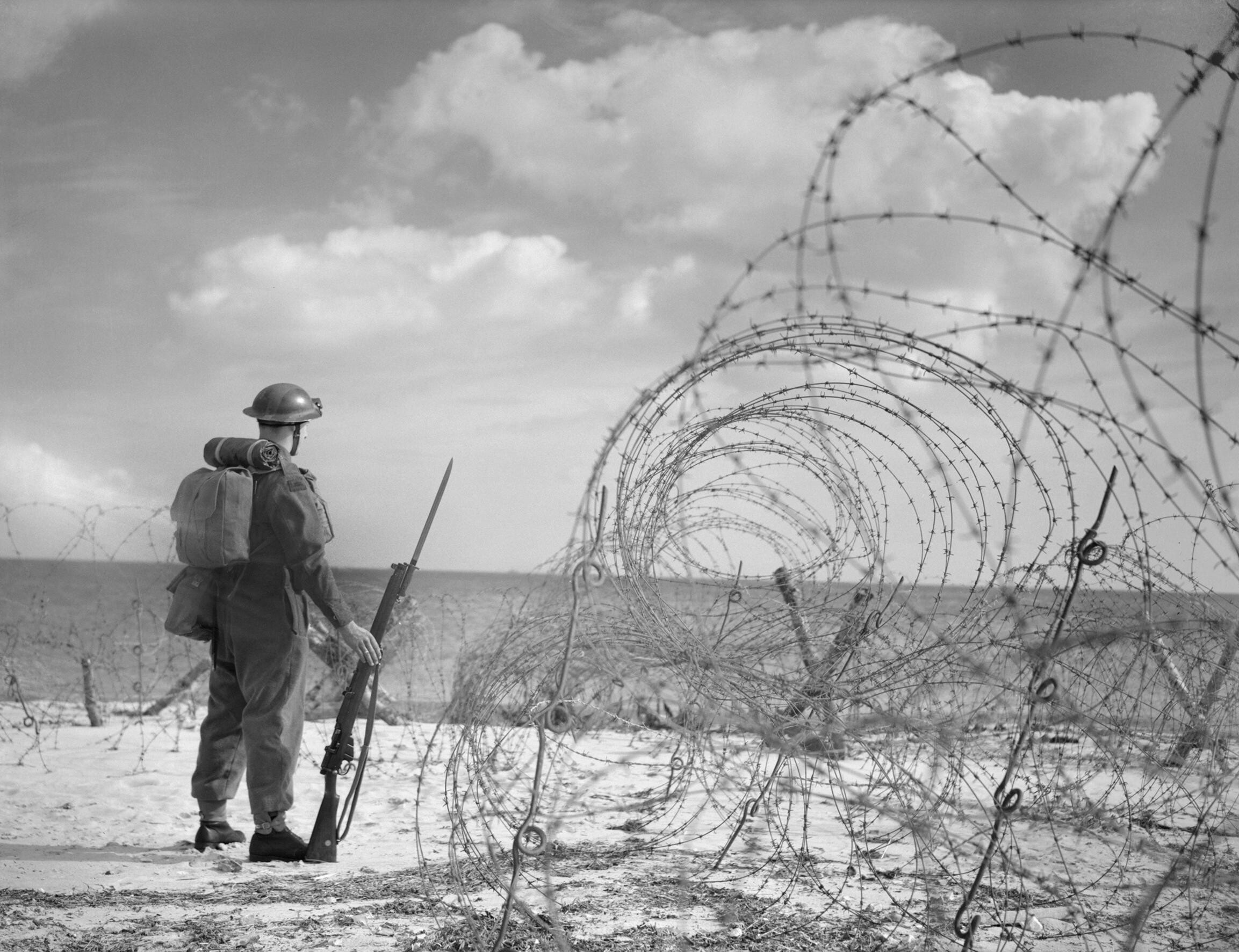
An infantryman, standing among barbed wire of the beach defences, looks out over the English Channel.

In 1940, following the Battle of France, the UK prepared for a potential Axis invasion. As the year progressed, the size of the Army increased quickly. Newly formed infantry battalions were grouped together to create the county divisions. These formations were around 10,000 men strong, and were assigned to defend the coastlines of threatened sectors of the country and man coastal artillery. These divisions were largely immobile and lacked divisional assets such as artillery, engineers, and reconnaissance forces. This allowed infantry divisions to be freed up from such duties and to form a reserve further inland for counterattacking enemy forces.

These formations maintained their coastal defence role, even after the German invasion of the Soviet Union in June 1941; British military planners acknowledged that if the Soviet Union collapsed, Germany could easily transfer substantial forces west. This perceived threat subsided in late 1941, with the arrival of autumn and winter weather and coupled with the production of new equipment for the British Army. The latter allowed the War Office to take steps to better balance the army, with the creation of additional armour and special forces units. Consequently, the county divisions were disbanded or redesignated.

County divisions
Formation name	Date formed	Date formation ceased to exist	Divisional insignia	Locations served	Notable campaigns	Notes	Source(s)
Devon and Cornwall County Division	28 February 1941	1 December 1941		UK	did not see combat	On 1 December 1941, the division was redesignated as the 77th Infantry Division.	
Dorset County Division	24 February 1941	31 December 1941		UK	did not see combat	The division first took command of units on 24 April 1941, ceased to function on 24 November 1941, and was disbanded on 31 December 1941.	
Durham and North Riding County Division	12 March 1941	1 December 1941		UK	did not see combat	The division was redesignated Durham and North Riding Coastal Area on 1 December 1941, and ceased to act as a division.	
Essex County Division	18 February 1941	7 October 1941		UK	did not see combat	Formed from the redesignation of the West Sussex County Division, the division was disbanded on 7 October 1941.	
Hampshire County Division	28 February 1941	31 December 1941		UK	did not see combat	The division was formed from the redesignation of the Hampshire Area command, ceased to function as a division on 25 November 1941, and was disbanded on 31 December 1941.	
Lincolnshire County Division	24 February 1941	31 December 1941		UK	did not see combat	The division became operational on 27 March 1941, ceased to function as a division on 25 November 1941, and was disbanded on 31 December 1941.	
Norfolk County Division	24 December 1940	18 November 1941	N/A	UK	did not see combat	The division was redesignated as the 76th Infantry Division on 18 November 1941. It is not known if the division had an insignia, or if it used the insignia worn after it became the 76th Infantry Division.	
Northumberland County Division	24 February 1941	21 December 1941		UK	did not see combat	The division ceased to function as a division on 1 December 1941, and was disbanded on 21 December 1941.	
West Sussex County Division	9 November 1940	18 February 1941		UK	did not see combat	The division was formed when "Brocforce", an ad hoc formation based around an infantry battalion and supporting arms, was redesignated. The division was renamed the Essex County Division on 18 February 1941.	
Yorkshire County Division	24 February 1941	1 December 1941		UK	did not see combat	The division became operational on 19 March 1941, was redesignated as the East Riding District on 1 December 1941, and ceased to function as a division.	

== Infantry ==
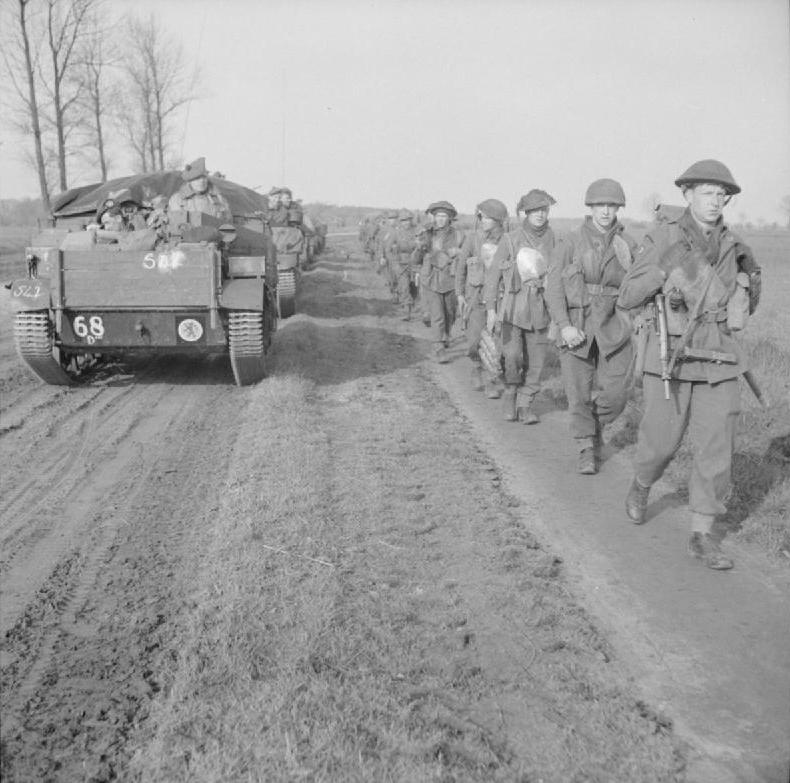
British infantry on the move, alongside Universal Carriers, 1945

The infantry were the backbone of the British Army, and were intended to be mobile and with sufficient integrated artillery to be able to overcome opposing forces. At the start of the war, the infantry were separated into two classes: infantry divisions and motor divisions. Each infantry division had three infantry brigades and three artillery regiments. In 1939, these divisions had an establishment of 13,863 men, 72 field guns, and 2,993 vehicles. The motor division had two motorised infantry brigades and two artillery regiments, with an establishment of 10,136 men, 48 field guns, and 2,326 vehicles. The intended offensive use of the infantry division was to penetrate the enemy's defensive line, with the support of infantry tanks from independent tank brigades. Any gap created would then be exploited by armoured divisions, and the subsequent captured territory would be secured by the faster and more mobile motor divisions. The motor division, while being able to transport all of its infantry, was weaker than the infantry division as a result of the decreased amount of manpower and firepower. After the Battle of France, the British Army implemented lessons learnt from the campaign in France, which included the decision to base the standard division around three brigades, and the abandonment of the motor division concept. This change saw four infantry divisions disbanded to reassign troops to the former motor divisions.

The Army was split into two branches: the full-time professional force of regulars, and the part-time Territorial Army. Both branches maintained divisions. By 1939, the Territorial Army's intended role was to be the sole method of expanding the size of the army (in contrast to the creation of Kitchener's Army during the First World War). All members of the Territorial Army were required to take the general service obligation: if the British Government decided, territorial soldiers could be deployed overseas for combat. This avoided the complications of the First World War-era Territorial Force, whose members were initially not required to leave Britain unless they volunteered for overseas service. The pre-war Territorial Army divisions were referred to as 'the first-line'. Prior to the outbreak of the Second World War, the first-line formations were ordered to create new formations in a process called 'duplicating'; the new formations were called 'the second-line'. Planners intended the first-line formations to recruit over their establishments (aided by an increase in pay, the removal of restrictions on promotion which had hindered prior recruiting, construction of better-quality barracks, and an increase in supper rations) and then form second-line formations from cadres around which the divisions could be expanded.

In 1941, the divisions were divided between being listed as higher establishment formations, and lower establishment ones. The former were intended for deployment overseas and combat, whereas the latter were restricted to home defence in a static role, and were reduced in size. In 1941, a division was intended to have 17,298 men, who were equipped primarily with rifles. They were to be supplemented by 451 sub-machine guns, 768 light machine guns, 48 medium machine guns, 218 mortars, 72 field guns, 48 anti-tank guns, 48 anti-aircraft guns, and 4,166 vehicles. In 1944, the establishment was increased 18,347 men, 6,525 sub-machine guns, 1,162 light machine guns, 359 mortars, 436 PIAT anti-tank weapons, 72 field guns, 110 anti-tank guns, and 4,330 vehicles. Out of the overall total of men within the division, around 7,000 were frontline infantry and the rest allocated to the various divisional supporting arms and services. The overall strength of a division could vary considerably. For example, during the Siege of Tobruk in 1941, the 70th Infantry Division was 28,000 men strong; in June 1944, the total combined strength of the remaining five lower establishment divisions was 17,845 men; and in July 1944, the higher establishment 15th (Scottish) Infantry Division was 16,970 men strong.

In 1942, the British Army experimented with the format of their infantry formations. Several were converted into "mixed divisions" via the removal of one infantry brigades, and a brigade of tanks being assigned in their place. The concept was deemed not successful, and abandoned the following year. During 1943, the War Office intended to provide eight tank brigades (equipped with infantry tanks) to the army. These would be a corps-level asset that could then be attached to infantry divisions as needed. Due to the lack of infantry tank production, only three such brigades were available. However, several independent armoured brigades (equipped with the M4 Sherman medium tank) were formed. The independent armoured brigades were utilised in the same manner as the tank brigades. In Northwest Europe, infantry divisions had access to specialised tanks from the 79th Armoured Division. These tank formations would be attached to the infantry division as needed.

Infantry divisions
Formation name	Existing or date created	Date formation ceased to exist	Divisional insignia	Locations served	Notable campaigns	Branch	Notes	Source(s)
Guards Division	12 June 1945	N/A		North West Europe	did not see combat	Regular Army	The division was formed in Germany following the reorganisation of the Guards Armoured Division.	
1st Infantry Division	Existing	N/A		UK, France, Belgium, Tunisia, Italy, Palestine	Battle of France, Tunisian, Italian	Regular Army	The division ended the war in Palestine. The division's first insignia is shown.	
1st (African) Division	24 July 1940; 20 August 1941	24 November 1940; 23 November 1941		British Kenya, Italian Somaliland, Abyssinia	did not see combat	Regular Army	The division was raised from men recruited in Nigeria and the British East Africa colonies. The division was redesignated as the 11th (African) Division on 24 November 1940. It was reformed in Kenya on 20 August 1941, and disbanded again on 23 November 1941.	
1st London Division	Existing	N/A		UK, Iraq, Palestine, Tunisia, Italy, Egypt, Italian-Libya	Tunisian, Italian	First-line Territorial Army	At the start of the war, the division was a motor division. It became an infantry division in July 1940, and was redesignated the 56th (London) Infantry Division on 16 November 1940. It ended the war in Italy.	
2nd Infantry Division	Existing	N/A		UK, France, Belgium, British India, Burma	Battle of France, Battle of Kohima, Burma campaign 1944–45	Regular Army	The division ended the war in India.	
2nd (African) Division	19 July 1940	24 November 1940		East Africa, Italian Somaliland, Abyssinia	did not see combat	Regular Army	The division was raised from men recruited in the Gold Coast and Britain's East African colonies. The division was redesignated as the 12th (African) Division on 24 November 1940.	
2nd London Division	Existing	N/A		UK	did not see combat	Second-line Territorial Army	The division was formed as the duplicate of the 1st London Division. At the start of the war, it was a motor division. It became an infantry division in June 1940, and was redesignated the 47th (London) Infantry Division on 21 November 1940. In December 1941, it became a lower establishment division. It was disbanded on 31 August 1944, and reformed on 1 September as the 47th Infantry (Reserve) Division, a training formation.	
3rd Infantry Division	Existing	N/A		UK, France, Belgium, Netherlands, Germany	Battle of France, Normandy, Allied advance from Paris to the Rhine, Western Allied invasion of Germany	Regular Army	The division ended the war in Germany.	
4th Infantry Division	Existing	N/A		UK, France, Belgium, Tunisia, Egypt, Italy, Greece	Battle of France, Tunisian, Italian, Greek Civil War	Regular Army	The division's first insignia is shown. The division ended the war in Greece.	
5th Infantry Division	Existing	N/A		UK, France, Belgium, British India, Iraq, Iran, Syria, Egypt, Italy, Palestine, Germany	Battle of France, Allied invasion of Sicily, Italian, Western Allied invasion of Germany	Regular Army	The division ended the war in Germany.	
6th Infantry Division	3 November 1939; 17 February 1941	17 June 1940; 10 October 1941		Egypt, Palestine, Greece, Syria, Italian-Libya	Battle of Crete, Syria-Lebanon, Siege of Tobruk	Regular Army	The division was formed by the redesignation of the 7th Infantry Division. It ceased to exist on 17 June 1940, and was then reformed on 17 February 1941. The division was redesignated as the 70th Infantry Division on 10 October 1941.	
7th Infantry Division	Existing	3 November 1939	N/A	Palestine, Egypt	did not see combat	Regular Army	The division was redesignated as the 6th Infantry Division, on 3 November 1939.	
8th Infantry Division	Existing; 2 June 1942	3 November 1939; 31 October 1943		Palestine, Syria	did not see combat	Regular Army	The existing division was disbanded on 28 February 1940. A new 8th Division, dubbed '8th Division (Syria)', was raised on 2 June 1942. It was an internal security formation, and consisted largely of administration personnel. The reformed division was disbanded on 31 October 1943	
9th (Highland) Infantry Division	Existing	7 August 1940		UK	did not see combat	Second-line Territorial Army	The division was formed as the duplicate of the 51st (Highland) Infantry Division. On 7 August 1940, the division was redesignated as the 51st (Highland) Infantry Division.	
11th (African) Division	24 November 1940	26 July 1941		British Kenya, Italian Somaliland, Abyssinia	East African	Regular Army	The division was formed when the 1st (African) Division was redesignated	
11th (East Africa) Division	15 February 1943	N/A		East Africa, Ceylon, Burma, British India	Burma	Regular Army	The division was formed from men recruited in Kenya, Northern Rhodesia, Nyasaland, Tanganyika, and Uganda. The division's first insignia is shown. The division ended the war in India	
12th (African) Division	24 November 1940	18 April 1943		East Africa, Italian Somaliland, Abyssinia	East African	Regular Army	The division was formed when the 2nd (African) Division was redesignated, and was disbanded 18 April 1943.	
12th (Eastern) Infantry Division	10 October 1939	11 July 1940		UK, France	Battle of France	Second-line Territorial Army	Duplicate of the 44th (Home Counties) Infantry Division, the division was disbanded on 11 July 1940, after it returned to the UK.	
12th Division (SDF)	11 July 1942	12 January 1945		Italian-Libya	did not see combat	Regular Army	The division was formed by the redesignation of the 1st Sudan Defence Force Brigade, and served as a security force on the lines of communication behind the Eighth Army. On 12 January 1945, the formation lost its division title when it was redesignated the Sudan Defence Force Group (North Africa). A white diamond was used as the divisional insignia, and was potentially worn alongside the insignia of the Sudan Defence Force.	
15th (Scottish) Infantry Division	Existing	N/A		UK, France, Belgium, Netherlands, Germany	Normandy, Allied advance from Paris to the Rhine, Western Allied invasion of Germany	Second-line Territorial Army	The division was formed as the duplicate of the 52nd (Lowland) Infantry Division, and ended the war in Germany.	
18th Infantry Division	30 September 1939	15 February 1942		UK, British India, Malaya, Singapore	Battle of Singapore	Second-line Territorial Army	The division was formed as the duplicate of the 54th (East Anglian) Infantry Division. On 15 February 1942, after the Battle of Singapore, and its personnel were taken prisoner.	
23rd (Northumbrian) Division	2 October 1939	30 June 1940		UK, France	Battle of France	Second-line Territorial Army	The division was formed as the duplicate of the 50th (Northumbrian) Infantry Division, and was disbanded on 30 June 1940 following its return to the United Kingdom.	
36th Infantry Division	1 September 1944	N/A		Burma, British India	Burma	Regular Army	The division was formed from the redesignation of the 36th Indian Infantry Division, and ended the war in India.	
38th (Welsh) Infantry Division	18 September 1939; 1 September 1944	15 August 1944; N/A		UK	did not see combat	Second-line Territorial Army	The division was formed as the duplicate of the 53rd (Welsh) Infantry Division. The division was placed on lower establishment on 1 December 1941, and was disbanded on 15 August 1944. It was reformed as the 38th Infantry (Reserve) Division, a training formation to replace the disbanded 80th Infantry (Reserve) Division, on 1 September 1944.	
42nd (East Lancashire) Infantry Division	Existing	1 November 1941		UK, France, Belgium	Battle of France	First-line Territorial Army	On 1 November 1941, the division was redesignated and reorganised as the 42nd Armoured Division.	
43rd (Wessex) Infantry Division	Existing	N/A		UK, France, Belgium, Netherlands, Germany	Normandy, Allied advance from Paris to the Rhine, Operation Market Garden, Western Allied invasion of Germany	First-line Territorial Army	The division ended the war in Germany.	
44th (Home Counties) Infantry Division	Existing	31 January 1943		UK, France, Egypt	Battle of France, Second Battle of El Alamein	First-line Territorial Army	The division was disbanded in Egypt, so that its forces could be dispersed to other formations to ensure they stayed up to strength.	
45th Infantry Division	Existing	N/A		UK	did not see combat	Second-line Territorial Army	The division was formed as the duplicate of the 43rd (Wessex) Infantry Division. It was placed on the lower establishment in December 1941, and was disbanded on 30 August 1944. It was reformed as the 45th (Holding) Division on 1 September, to replace the 77th (Holding) Division, and was redesignated as the 45th Division on 1 December 1944.	
46th Infantry Division	2 October 1939	N/A		UK, France, Tunisia, Italy, Egypt, Palestine, Greece, Austria	Battle of France, Tunisian, Italian, Greek Civil War	Second-line Territorial Army	The division was formed as the duplicate of the 49th (West Riding) Infantry Division, and ended the war in Austria.	
48th (South Midland) Infantry Division	Existing	N/A		UK, France, Belgium	Battle of France	First-line Territorial Army	The division was placed on the lower establishment in November 1941. On 20 December 1942, it was redesignated as the 48th Infantry (Reserve) Division, a training formation.	
49th (West Riding) Infantry Division	Existing	N/A		UK, Iceland, France, Belgium, Netherlands	Normandy, Allied advance from Paris to the Rhine, Western Allied invasion of Germany	First-line Territorial Army	The division became "Alabaster Force", for the occupation of Iceland. On return to the UK, in 1942, it was reformed as the 49th (West Riding) Infantry Division. It ended the war in the Netherlands, under Canadian command.	
50th (Northumbrian) Infantry Division	Existing	N/A		UK, France, Belgium, Egypt, Cyprus, Iraq, Syria, Italian-Libya, Tunisia, Italy, Norway	Battle of France, Western Desert, Tunisian, Allied invasion of Sicily, Normandy, Western Allied invasion of Germany	First-line Territorial Army	The division started the war as a motor division, and was reorganised as an infantry division in June 1940. On 16 December 1944, after being withdrawn from Europe, the division was redesignated as the 50th Infantry (Reserve) Division, a training formation. On 1 August 1945, the divisional headquarters moved to Norway, and became British Land Forces Norway.	
51st (Highland) Infantry Division	Existing; 7 August 1940	N/A		UK, France, Belgium, Egypt, Italian-Libya, Tunisia, Italy, Netherlands, Germany	Battle of France, Western Desert, Tunisian, Allied invasion of Sicily, Italian, Normandy, Allied advance from Paris to the Rhine, Western Allied invasion of Germany	First-line Territorial Army	The division was captured in France in 1940, and then reformed on 7 August 1940 by the redesignation of the 9th (Highland) Infantry Division in the United Kingdom. The division ended the war in Germany.	
52nd (Lowland) Infantry Division	Existing	N/A		UK, France, Belgium, Netherlands, Germany	Allied advance from Paris to the Rhine, Western Allied invasion of Germany	First-line Territorial Army	The division was deployed to France for seven days, during June 1940, following the Dunkirk Evacuation. On return to the UK, the division retrained as a mountain division and then retrained for airlanding operations. The division did not operate in either role, and was deployed in October 1944 as an infantry division. It ended the war in Germany.	
53rd (Welsh) Infantry Division	Existing	N/A		UK, France, Belgium, Netherlands, Germany	Normandy, Allied advance from Paris to the Rhine, Western Allied invasion of Germany	First-line Territorial Army	The division ended the war in Germany.	
54th (East Anglian) Infantry Division	Existing	14 December 1943		UK	did not see combat	First-line Territorial Army	The division was placed on the lower establishment in January 1942, and was disbanded on 14 December 1943.	
55th (West Lancashire) Infantry Division	Existing	N/A		UK	did not see combat	First-line Territorial Army	The division was a motor division at the start of the war, and was reorganised as an infantry formation in June 1940. It was placed on the lower establishment in January 1942, and raised to the higher establishment in May 1944. The division was subsequently drained of manpower until it no longer existed, but the name was maintained for deception purposes.	
59th (Staffordshire) Infantry Division	15 September 1939	19 October 1944		UK, France	Normandy	Second-line Territorial Army	The division was formed as a duplicate of the 55th (West Lancashire) Infantry Division. It started the war as a motor division, and was reorganised as an infantry division in June 1940. At the end of the Normandy Campaign, the division was broken-up to provide reinforcements for other formations. The division headquarters was placed in 'suspended animation' on 19 October 1944, and was never reformed.	
61st Infantry Division	Existing	N/A		UK	did not see combat	Second-line Territorial Army	The division was formed as the duplicate of the 48th (South Midland) Infantry Division. The divisional headquarters deployed to Norway, during the Norwegian campaign, although the division itself was not deployed. In August 1945, the division was reorganised as a Light Division.	
66th Infantry Division	27 September 1939	23 June 1940		UK	did not see combat	Second-line Territorial Army	The division was formed as the duplicate of the 42nd (East Lancashire) Infantry Division, and was disbanded on 23 June 1940.	
70th Infantry Division	10 October 1941	24 November 1943		Italian-Libya, Egypt, British India	Siege of Tobruk	Regular Army	The division was formed by the redesignation of the 6th Infantry Division. In September 1943, the division was assigned to the Chindits and started reorganising its forces into long range penetration units. The division ceased to function on 24 October, and was disbanded on 24 November 1943.	
76th Infantry Division	18 November 1941	1 September 1944		UK	did not see combat	Regular Army	The division was formed as a lower establishment formation, by the redesignation of the Norfolk County Division. It was redesignated as the 76th Infantry (Reserve) Division, a training formation, on 20 December 1942. On 1 September 1944, the division was disbanded.	
77th Infantry Division	1 December 1941	1 September 1944		UK	did not see combat	Regular Army	The division formed as a lower establishment formation, by the redesignation of the Devon and Cornwall County Division. It was redesignated as the 77th Infantry (Reserve) Division, a training formation, on 20 December 1942. On 1 December 1943, it was redesignated as the 77th Holding Division, an organisation to temporarily hold, retrain, and sort personnel. The division was disbanded on 1 September 1944.	
78th Infantry Division	25 May 1942	N/A		UK, Tunisia, Italy, Austria	Tunisian, Allied invasion of Sicily, Italian	Regular Army	The division ended the war in Austria.	
80th Infantry (Reserve) Division	1 January 1943	1 September 1944		UK	did not see combat	Regular Army	The division was formed as a training formation, and was disbanded on 1 September 1944.	
81st (West Africa) Division	1 March 1943	N/A		Nigeria, British India, Burma	Burma	Regular Army	The division was formed from men recruited in Nigeria, the Gold Coast, and Sierra Leone. The original name of the division, which lasted for three days, was the 1st (West African) Division. The division ended the war in India.	
82nd (West Africa) Division	1 August 1943	N/A		Nigeria, British India, Burma	Burma	Regular Army	The division was formed from men recruited in Nigeria, the Gold Coast, and Sierra Leone. The division ended the war in Burma.	
Beauman Division	29 May 1940	June 1940	N/A	France	Battle of France	Regular Army	Improvised division formed from available troops to defend Rouen and Dieppe, and lacked the usual divisional support elements. The division was disbanded following its evacuation from France, on 17 June 1940.	
Royal Marines Division	August 1940	April 1943		UK	did not see combat as a division	Royal Marines	The division was disbanded in April 1943, and the men were either trained to man landing craft, or joined the Commandos and helped raise six new Royal Marine units.	
Y Division	February 1943	16 March 1943	N/A	Tunisia	Tunisian	Regular Army	An ad hoc formation formed during the Tunisia Campaign, and disbanded on 16 March 1943.	

== See also ==
- British deception formations in World War II
- Divisional insignia of the British Army
- List of British divisions in World War I
- List of British brigades of the Second World War
- Military history of Britain during World War II
