= Hampshire County Division =

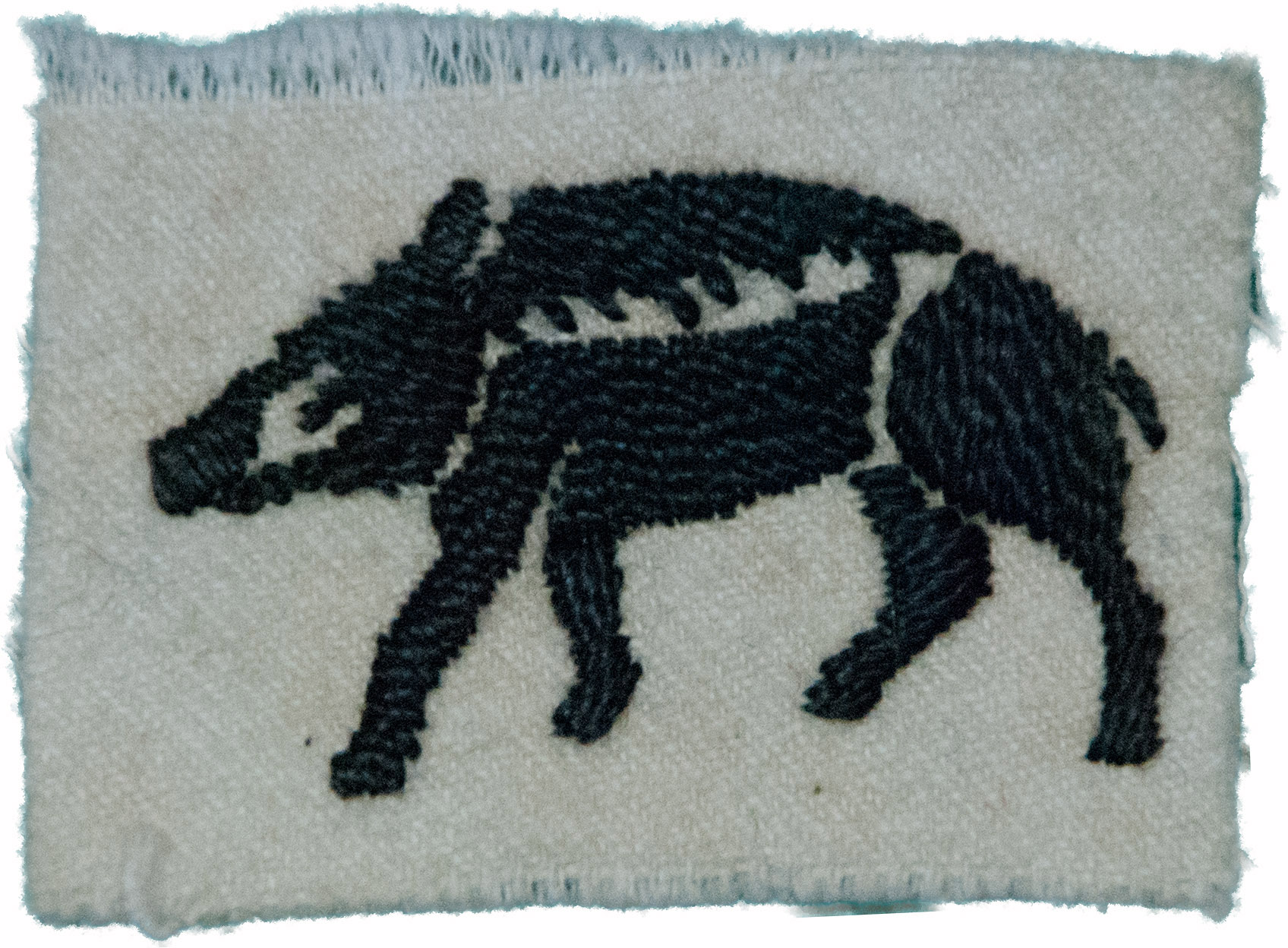
- Division insignia of the Hampshire County Division
- Active: 28 February 1941 - 31 December 1941
- Country: United Kingdom
- Branch: British Army
- Type: Static Division
- Role: Home Defence

The Hampshire County Division was a short-lived formation of the British Army, located in South East England on the coast of the English Channel. It was raised in the Second World War and was formed on 28 February 1941 by the redesignation of Hampshire Area. On 25 November the division ceased to function and the headquarters was disbanded on 31 December. It was commanded by Major-General G. J. P. St. Clair and was an infantry only formation consisting of one Independent Infantry Brigade (Home) and three sub areas from the Hampshire area. Combat support, artillery, engineers etc., would be provided by other local formations. and served under V Corps.

== Order of Battle ==
The brigade served with the division from its formation until 30 November 1941.

- 214th Independent Infantry Brigade (Home)
  - 6th Battalion, The Oxfordshire and Buckinghamshire Light Infantry (left 26 November 1941)
  - 19th Battalion, The Royal Fusiliers
  - 20th Battalion, The Royal Fusiliers
  - 21st Battalion, The Royal Fusiliers (left 15 July 1941)
  - 11th Battalion, The West Yorkshire Regiment (joined 15 July, left 26 November 1941)
  - 11th Battalion, The Hampshire Regiment (joined 13 November 1941)
  - 12th Battalion, The Hampshire Regiment (joined 25 November 1941)

The brigade would join the 47th (London) Infantry Division.

== See also ==
- List of British divisions in World War II

== Bibliography ==
- Cole, Howard (1973). Formation Badges of World War 2 Britain, Commonwealth and Empire. London: Arms and Armour Press.
- Joslen, Lt-Col H.F. (1990) [1st. Pub. HMSO:1960]. Orders of Battle, Second World War, 1939–1945. London: London Stamp Exchange. ISBN 0-948130-03-2.
