= Altmaier (surname) =

Altmaier is a German surname. 'Alt' means 'old'. Notable people with the surname include:

- Daniel Altmaier (born 1998), German tennis player
- Jakob Altmaier (1889–1963), German politician
- Peter Altmaier (born 1958), German politician

== See also ==
- Peter Altmeier
- Altmeyer
- Altmayer
- Maier
