= Altmeyer =

Altmeyer is a surname. Notable people with the surname include:

- Arthur J. Altmeyer (1891–1972), American government official
- Fritz Altmeyer (1928–2013), German footballer
- Jeannine Altmeyer (born 1948), American soprano
- Ralf Altmeyer (born 1966), German virologist
- Theo Altmeyer (1931–2007), German classical tenor

== See also ==
- Altmayer, people with this surname
- Altmaier (surname), people with this surname
- Peter Altmeier
