= Nelson Russell =

British Army officer (1897–1971)

Brigadier Nelson Russell CB DSO MC
- Born: 7 July 1897; Lisburn, County Antrim, Ireland
- Died: 20 October 1971 (aged 74); Newcastle, County Down, Northern Ireland
- Military career
- Allegiance: United Kingdom
- Branch: British Army
- Service years: 1914–1950
- Rank: Brigadier
- Service number: 9593
- Unit: Royal Irish Fusiliers
- Commands: Ulster Independent Infantry Brigade Group (1947–1950); Belfast Sub-Area (1945); 38th (Irish) Infantry Brigade (1942–1944); 6th Battalion, Royal Irish Fusiliers (c. 1940)
- Conflicts: First World War; Second World War
- Awards: Companion of the Order of the Bath; Distinguished Service Order; Military Cross; Mentioned in Despatches (2)

Brigadier Nelson Russell, CB, DSO, MC (7 July 1897 − 20 October 1971) was a British Army officer who served in both world wars. Russell represented Ireland in both cricket and field hockey. He also played for Lisburn Cricket Club and Lisnagarvey Hockey Club.

== Early life and family ==
Russell's father was Nelson Russell of Lisburn. He was educated at Campbell College, Belfast. In 1926, he married Edith, also from Lisburn; the couple had no children.

== Military career ==
In April 1914, Russell was mobilised as a reservist and joined the Royal Irish Fusiliers as a second lieutenant. He was attached to the 1st Battalion for service in France and Belgium between July 1915 and July 1916 – winning the Military Cross – and subsequently became adjutant at 10 Brigade Bombing School.

After the end of the First World War, Russell was commissioned into The Royal Irish Fusiliers as a second lieutenant. During the inter-war period, he served in Egypt, India, Sudan, and Palestine. In 1937, he was promoted to major and served as a brigade major, until the end of March 1940. After briefly commanding the 6th Battalion, Royal Irish Fusiliers and an appointment as a staff officer (GSO2), he was promoted to the acting rank of brigadier on 1 July 1942 and took command of the 38th (Irish) Infantry Brigade, commanding it in Britain, North Africa, Sicily, and Italy from July 1942 until February 1944. That month saw Russell being declared unfit to continue to command the brigade, relinquishing control to Brigadier Thomas "Pat" Scott, also of the Royal Irish Fusiliers. During the period in North Africa from 1942 to 1943, he also took command of the ad hoc Y Division during the fighting in North Africa. He was awarded the Distinguished Service Order in 1943, during the Tunisian campaign, and was subsequently mentioned in despatches whilst in Sicily and Italy.

For a short period after the war, Russell was commander of the Belfast Sub-Area, and then commander of the Belfast Garrison. He was then appointed commander of the Ulster Independent Infantry Brigade Group from 1947 to 1950. He was promoted to brigadier (previously an acting or temporary rank) in 1950, shortly before his retirement on 4 August 1950.

He was Serjeant-at-Arms to the Parliament of Northern Ireland between 1951 and 1959.

== Awards and decorations ==
- Companion of the Order of the Bath (9 June 1949)
- Distinguished Service Order (5 August 1943)
- Military Cross (16 May 1916)
- Mentioned in Despatches twice (23 March 1944 and 24 August 1944)
- 1914–15 Star
- British War Medal 1914-1920
- Victory Medal
- General Service Medal with "Palestine" clasp for 1936–39

Citation for Military Cross:

For conspicuous gallantry during a raid on the enemy's trenches. He was the first man into the trench, where he shot an officer, and finally skilfully withdrew after doing all the damage possible.

== Bibliography ==
- Doherty, Richard (2004). Ireland's Generals in the Second World War. Four Courts Press. ISBN 9781851828654.
- Haines, Keith (2014). Brigadier Nelson Russell of Lisburn. Cottage Publications. ISBN 978-1900935999.
