= Operation Aerial =

Second World War evacuation from ports in western France

- Part of the Battle of France
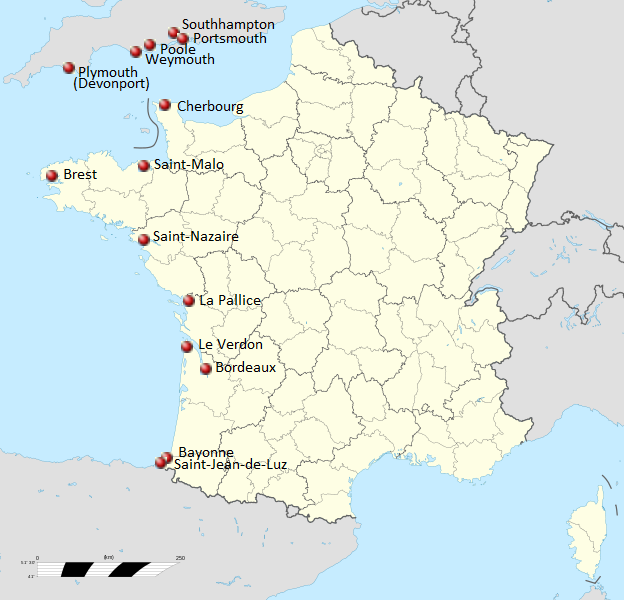
- Ports used during the evacuation of Allied forces
Date	15–25 June 1940
Location	French Atlantic coast 47°N 2°E
Result	See Aftermath section

Belligerents
United Kingdom; Canada; France; Belgium; Poland; Czechoslovakia	Germany

Commanders and leaders
Alan Brooke	Gerd von Rundstedt; Helmuth Förster

Operation Aerial was the evacuation of Allied military forces and civilians from ports in western France. The operation took place from 15 to 25 June 1940 during the Second World War. The embarkation followed the Allied military collapse in the Battle of France against Nazi Germany. Operation Dynamo, the evacuation from Dunkirk and Operation Cycle from Le Havre, had finished on 13 June. British and Allied ships were covered from French bases by five Royal Air Force (RAF) fighter squadrons and assisted by aircraft based in England to lift British, Polish and Czechoslovak troops, civilians and equipment from Atlantic ports, particularly from St Nazaire and Nantes.

On 17 June, the Luftwaffe evaded RAF fighter patrols and attacked evacuation ships in the Loire estuary, sinking the Cunard liner and troopship HMT Lancastria which was carrying thousands of troops, RAF personnel and civilians. The ship sank quickly but nearby vessels went to the rescue and saved about 2,477 passengers and crew while under air attack. The death toll is unknown because the passenger count broke down in the haste to embark as many people as possible. Estimates of at least 3,500 dead make the sinking the greatest loss of life in a British ship. The British government tried to keep the sinking of Lancastria secret on the orders of the Prime Minister Winston Churchill.

Some equipment was embarked on the evacuation ships but alarmist reports about the progress of the German Army towards the coast led some operations to be terminated early and much equipment was destroyed or left behind. The official evacuation ended on 25 June, in conformity with the terms of the Armistice of 22 June 1940 agreed by the French and German authorities but informal departures continued from French Mediterranean ports until 14 August. From the end of Operation Dynamo at Dunkirk, Operation Cycle from Le Havre, elsewhere along the Channel coast and the termination of Operation Aerial, another 191,870 troops were rescued, bringing the total of military and civilian personnel returned to Britain during the Battle of France to 558,032, including 368,491 British troops.

== Background ==
=== Royal Navy ===
The evacuation of the British Expeditionary Force (BEF) from Dunkirk left a surplus of men on the lines-of-communication, base depots and other establishments among the 140,000 troops still in France. Sufficient lines-of-communication personnel for an armoured division and four infantry divisions and an Advanced Air Striking Force (AASF) were to be retained and the rest returned to Britain. Naval operations in the Norwegian campaign and the evacuation of Dunkirk had suffered losses, which temporarily weakened the Home Fleet, particularly in smaller vessels needed to escort evacuation ships from the French Atlantic coast. Losses inflicted on the surface ships of the Kriegsmarine made it impossible for the Germans to challenge British naval supremacy in the English Channel and the Bay of Biscay. Seven German submarines patrolling off the west coast of France made no attempt to interfere and only the Luftwaffe was used against the evacuations. Operation Aerial was commanded by Admiral William Milbourne James, the Commander-in-Chief, Portsmouth. James lacked the vessels necessary for convoys and organised a flow of troopships, storeships and motor vehicle vessels from Southampton, coasters to ply from Poole and the Dutch schuyts to work from Weymouth, while such warships as were available patrolled the shipping routes. Demolition parties sailed in the ships but it was hoped that supplies and equipment could be embarked as well as troops.

=== RAF ===
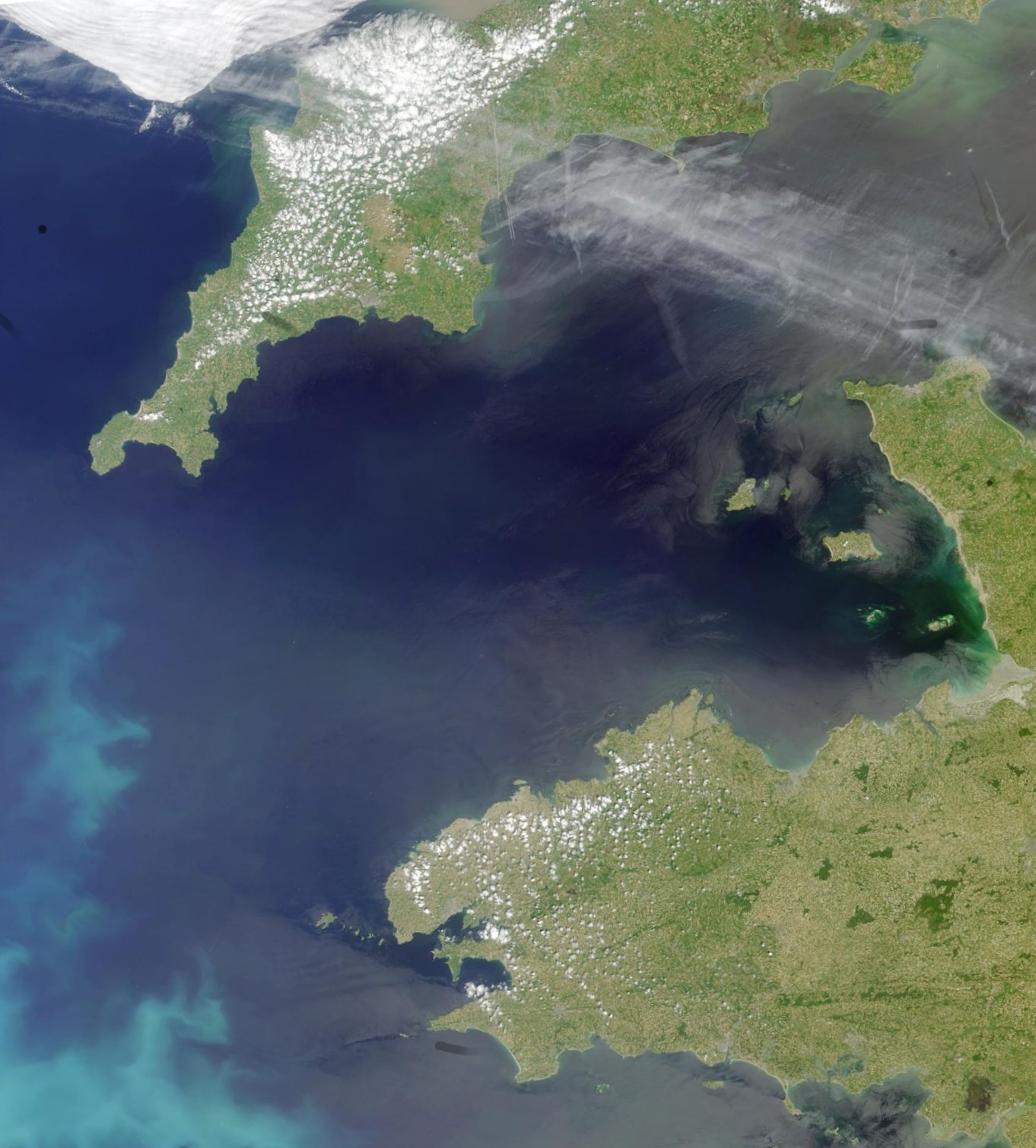
Satellite photograph of the western English Channel between south-west England and north-west France

After Dunkirk, the AASF squadrons in France had been moved to the area between Orléans and Le Mans during the lull before Fall Rot (Case Red), the German offensive over the Somme and Aisne rivers. From the new bases the AASF was able to operate anywhere along the front, but after the German breakthrough on 11 June, British Air Forces in France (Air Vice-Marshal Arthur Barratt) was warned by the Air Ministry to be ready for a quick getaway from France. The British squadrons were moved west to bases around Angers, Saumur, Rennes and Nantes, which were already full of French aircraft and severely congested. Barratt sent the light bomber squadrons back to England on 15 June and kept the five fighter squadrons to cover the evacuation of RAF ground staff and the three British divisions commanded by General Sir Alan Brooke.

After Marshal Philippe Pétain requested an armistice on 17 June, Barratt had to defend seven ports on the Atlantic coast and sent the AASF anti-aircraft batteries to La Pallice and La Rochelle, the least important embarkation harbours. Nantes and St Nazaire, the most important ports, were covered by 1 Squadron, 73 Squadron and 242 Squadron, with a small detachment covering Brest. Saint-Malo and Cherbourg were protected by 17 Squadron and 501 Squadron from the aerodrome at Dinard across the bay from Saint-Malo, then later from the Channel Islands. Fighter Command squadrons from RAF Tangmere were also available for Cherbourg and Coastal Command prepared to escort returning ships. Once the arrangements were made, Barratt left for England and the Senior Air Staff Officer (SASO), Air Vice-Marshal Douglas Evill took over.

=== Operations Dynamo and Cycle ===
Channel Coast ports

Operation Dynamo, the evacuation at Dunkirk from 26 May to 3 June, had rescued much of the fighting element of the BEF. Some units from the 1st Armoured Division, the Beauman Division and more than 150,000 support and line-of-communication troops, had been cut off in the south by the German dash to the sea. By the end of May, medical stores had been removed from Dieppe and a demolition party landed, ready to blow up the port infrastructure. A big depot at Le Havre had been run down by feeding troops in the area from it and removing military stores not immediately needed. A reserve of motor transport collected at Rouen had been used as transport for improvised units and special ammunition had been moved from the reserve around Buchy but the removal of the huge quantity of ordinary ammunition there was impossible.

On 9 June, the French commander at Le Havre contacted the 10th Army and the 51st (Highland) Division with a message that the Germans had captured Rouen and were heading for the coast. Ihler, the IX Corps commander and Major-General Victor Fortune, commander of the 51st (Highland) Division, decided that the only hope of escape was through Le Havre and abandoned the plan to retire through Rouen. The port admiral requested enough ships from the Admiralty to remove 85,000 troops but this contradicted the plans of the French supreme commander, Maxime Weygand. General John Dill (Chief of the Imperial General Staff) hesitated, ignorant that Weygand's delay in issuing the orders had made it impossible. The GOC British Troops in France, Lieutenant-General Sir Henry Karslake, had also urged several times that the retirement be accelerated but had no authority to issue orders. Only after receiving a message during the night from Fortune, that the 51st (Highland) Division was participating in a retreat by IX Corps towards Le Havre, did Dill learn of the true situation.

Fortune detached a force to guard Le Havre, comprising the 154th Infantry Brigade, A Brigade of the Beauman Division, two artillery regiments and engineers. Arkforce (Brigadier Stanley-Clarke), moved on the night of 9/10 June towards Fécamp, where most had passed through before the 7th Panzer Division arrived. A Brigade forced its way out but lost the wireless (radio) truck intended to keep contact with the 51st (Highland) Division. The possibility of holding a line from Fécamp to Lillebonne was discounted and Stanley-Clarke ordered Arkforce on to Le Havre. A Royal Navy demolition party had been in Le Havre since late May and the port was severely bombed by the Luftwaffe on 7 June; two days later, the Admiralty sent orders for an evacuation. James sent a flotilla leader, HMS Codrington, across the Channel, accompanied by six British and two Canadian destroyers, smaller craft and many Dutch schuyts.

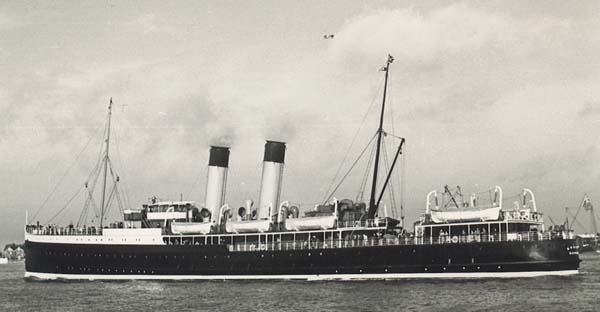
The troopship SS Bruges, lost to German bombing off Le Havre on 11 June.

A plan was hastily made to block Dieppe harbour and on 10 June, HMS Vega (Captain G. A. Garnon-Williams) escorted three blockships to the port. Two were sunk in the approach channel but the third ship hit a mine just outside, which prevented it being sunk at the entrance to the inner harbour. Beach parties landed at Le Havre to take control of the evacuation on 10 June and after a 24-hour postponement, the evacuation began on 11 June. The embarkation was hindered somewhat by the damage to the port caused by Luftwaffe bombing; the troopship SS Bruges was damaged and had to be beached.

Electrical power to the docks was cut, rendering the cranes on the docks useless; loading vehicles via ramps was tried but was too slow. On 12 June, RAF fighters began patrolling the port, deterring more raids and an attempt was made to save the transport and equipment by diverting it over the Seine, via the ferry crossings at Caudebec or the ships at Quillebeuf at the river mouth. The quartermaster of the 14th Royal Fusiliers succeeded in getting the transport away. The greatest number of troops were removed on the night of 12/13 June and the evacuation was completed by dawn; of 11,059 British troops evacuated, 9,000 men of 'A' Brigade were taken to Cherbourg and the 154th Infantry Brigade sailed via Cherbourg to England.

==== St Valery-en-Caux ====
On 10 June British destroyers reconnoitred the smaller ports to the east of Le Havre. HMS Ambuscade was damaged by artillery fire from the cliffs near St. Valery-en-Caux during the evening. Troops not needed to hold the perimeter at St Valery moved down to the beaches and the harbour but no ships arrived; thick fog prevented them from moving inshore. An armada of 67 merchant ships and 140 small craft had been assembled but few had wireless (radio) and the fog obscured visual signalling. Only at Veules-les-Roses were many soldiers rescued, under fire from German artillery, which damaged the destroyers HMS Bulldog, HMS Boadicea and Ambuscade. Near dawn, the troops at the harbour were ordered back into the town, only to discover that the local French commander had already negotiated a surrender. A total of 2,137 British and 1,184 French soldiers were rescued but over 6,000 men of the 51st (Highland) Division were taken prisoner on 12 June.

== Prelude ==
=== 2nd BEF ===
On 2 June, Brooke visited the War Office, having returned from Dunkirk on 30 May and was told by Dill to go back to France to assemble another BEF. In the emergency, the force would be the 51st (Highland) Infantry Division and 1st Armoured Division, already in France, with the 52nd (Lowland) Infantry Division and the 1st Canadian Infantry Division from Britain, to be followed by the 3rd Infantry Division as soon as it was re-equipped. The II Corps headquarters was spread around Britain after its return from Dunkirk and his first choice of chief of staff was busy with General Lord Gort, the former BEF commander, writing dispatches. Brooke warned Dill and the secretary of state for war, Anthony Eden, that the enterprise was futile, except as a political gesture. He was told that on return to France he would come under the authority of Weygand. In France, Fonblanque was still in command of the lines-of-communication troops of the original BEF and lieutenant-generals Karslake and James Marshall-Cornwall were assisting with command. A brigade group (the 157th (Highland Light Infantry) Brigade) of the 52nd (Lowland) Division departed for France on 7 June and Brooke returned five days later.

On 13 June, the RAF made a maximum effort to help the French armies that had been broken through on the Marne. The Germans were across the Seine in the west and the French armies near Paris fell back, isolating the Tenth Army on the Channel coast. The German advance threatened the airfields of the AASF, which was ordered to retreat towards Nantes or Bordeaux, while supporting the French armies for as long as they kept fighting. The AASF flew armed reconnaissance sorties over the Seine from dawn and German columns were attacked by a force of 10 Fairey Battles, then a second formation of 15 Battles followed by 15 Bristol Blenheims. On the Marne, 12 Battles attacked a concentration of German troops and tanks, followed by an attack by 26 Battles, which lost six aircraft and then a third attack by 15 Blenheims from Bomber Command, that lost another four. RAF attacks continued through the night, with 44 sorties over the Seine, 20 north of Paris, 41 on the Marne and 59 against road and rail communications and woods reported by the French to be full of German troops. Fighter sorties had been hampered by bad weather and were limited to coastal patrols.

Next day, attacks resumed against German units south of the Seine but the weather had worsened and fewer sorties were flown. A raid by 24 Blenheims with fighter escort was made on Merville airfield for a loss of 7 aircraft; ten Fighter Command squadrons patrolled twice in squadron strength or provided bomber escorts, the biggest effort since Dunkirk, as fighters of the AASF patrolled south of the Seine. During the night, 72 bombers attacked German marshalling yards and forests, and dropped mines in the Rhine river for a loss of two aircraft. The remnants of the 1st Armoured Division and two brigades of the Beauman Division were south of the river, along with thousands of lines-of-communication troops; but only the 157th Infantry Brigade of the 52nd (Lowland) Division, which had commenced disembarkation on 7 June, engaged in military operations. The brigade occupied successive defensive positions under command of the Tenth Army. The French armies were forced into divergent retreats with no obvious front line; on 12 June, Weygand had recommended that the French government seek an armistice, which led to the abortive plan to create a defensive zone in Brittany.

On 14 June, Brooke was able to prevent the rest of the 52nd (Lowland) Division being sent to join the 157th Infantry Brigade Group. During the night Brooke was informed that he was no longer under French command and must prepare to withdraw the British forces from France. Marshall-Cornwall was ordered to take command of all British forces under the Tenth Army as Norman Force and while continuing to co-operate, withdraw towards Cherbourg. The rest of the 52nd (Lowland) Division was ordered back to a defence line near Cherbourg to cover the evacuation on 15 June. The AASF was also directed to send the last bomber squadrons back to Britain and use the fighter squadrons to cover the evacuations. The German advance over the Seine had paused while bridges were built but the advance began again during the day, with the 157th Infantry Brigade Group engaged east of Conches-en-Ouche with the Tenth Army. The army was ordered to retreat to a line from Verneuil to Argentan and the Dives river, where the British took over an 8 miles (13 km) front either side of the Mortagne-au-Perche–Verneuil-sur-Avre road. German forces followed up quickly and on 16 June, the Tenth Army commander, General Robert Altmayer, ordered the army to retreat into the Brittany peninsula.

==== Breton redoubt ====
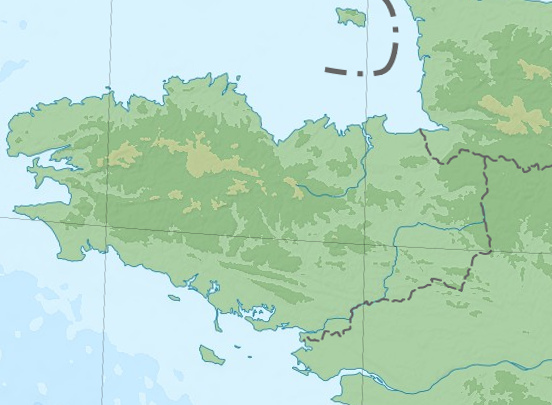
Topographic map of Brittany.

On 29 May the Prime Minister of France, Paul Reynaud, replied to Weygand, rejecting his recommendation that an armistice be considered and asked him to study the possibility that a national redoubt could be established around a naval port in the Brittany peninsula to retain freedom of the seas and contact with French allies. The idea was discussed by the French and British governments on 31 May and an operational instruction was drawn up on 5 June, in which Brooke was appointed to command the new BEF ("2nd BEF") being prepared for France. Plan W, the original plan to land the BEF in 1939, was used with the 52nd (Lowland) Infantry Division being directed to Cherbourg and to assemble at Evreux, ready to support the 51st (Highland) Infantry Division north of the Seine. On 6 June, Weygand issued orders to begin work on the redoubt under the command of General René Altmayer. (Note: Brother of Robert, the Tenth Army commander.)

German forces crossed the Seine on 9 June, cutting off the 51st (Highland) Division north of the river, two days after 52nd (Lowland) Division had begun to land and the assembly point of the division was changed to Rennes in Brittany; the 157th Infantry Brigade, which had arrived first, was directed to Beaumont near Le Mans; the rest of the division to follow on. The 1st Canadian Infantry Brigade of the 1st Canadian Infantry Division began its arrival at Brest on 11 June and was sent to Sablé-sur-Sarthe, on the assumption that two fresh divisions would be enough to allow the Tenth Army to retreat through them and take up positions prepared around the Brest peninsula. That day, the Anglo-French Supreme War Council met at Briare and General Charles de Gaulle (minister of war) was sent to Rennes to survey progress on the redoubt; on 12 June, de Gaulle reported that Quimper would be a favourable place for the government to retreat to, since it would be easy to take ship to England or Africa; the prospect of maintaining a redoubt in Brittany was non-existent.

Altmayer had reported that work had begun on defences, civilian labour had been recruited and 3,000 Polish troops had arrived to begin work, despite a lack of civil engineering machinery. Churchill visited France for the last time on 13 June, met Reynaud and approved the project. Brooke had visited the 1st Canadian Division in England to give the gist of the plan and met Weygand and Georges at Briare on 14 June, where all agreed that the plan was futile but the will of the civilian leadership had to be respected and the generals signed a joint agreement. Brooke telephoned Dill in London to find that no agreement had been made with the French and after checking called with the news that "Mr. Churchill knew nothing about the Brittany project". Churchill was of the view that the new corps forming in France should stay, at least until the final French collapse, then return through the nearest port. Without the support of the 52nd (Lowland) Division on the left flank, the Tenth Army was cut off from Brittany when two German divisions reached the peninsula first and forced the French line of retreat south to the Loire. French troops already in the area were able to join the main French force after the Canadians had departed for England.

== Evacuations ==
=== Cherbourg and Saint-Malo ===
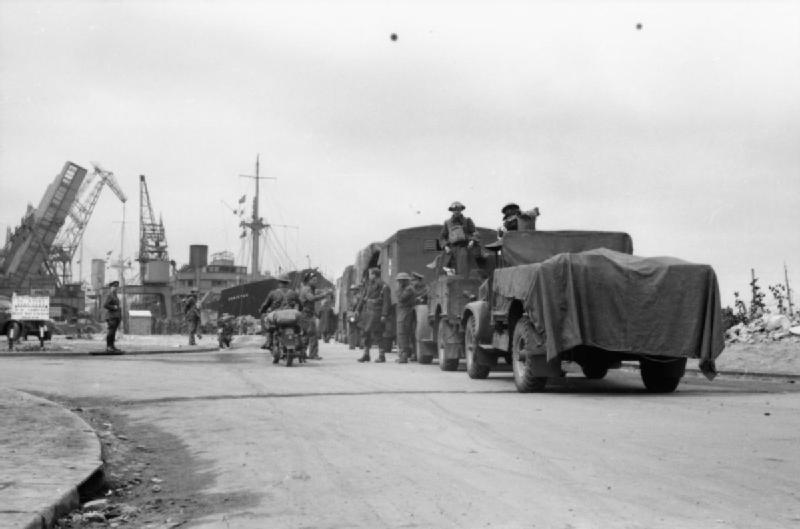
British motor unit on the quay at Cherbourg awaiting evacuation to England, June 1940.

Initially headquarters in England were reluctant to accept that evacuation was necessary, and on 15 June Alan Brooke was told by Dill that "for political reasons" the two brigades of the 52nd Division under Drew could not be embarked from Cherbourg at present. After further telephone discussions that day with Dill and Eden, when he said shipping and "valuable hours" were being wasted, he got permission to embark the gunners but not the infantry. Most of the 52nd Lowland Division and the remnants of the 1st Armoured Division embarked from 15 to 17 June. The Beauman Division and Norman Force, both improvised formations, left on the evening of 17 June.

The rearguard battalion was evacuated in the afternoon of 18 June. A total of 30,630 men were rescued from Cherbourg and taken to Portsmouth. At Saint-Malo, 21,474 men, mostly of the 1st Canadian Division, were evacuated from 17 to 18 June; all but 789 passengers being British; no-one was killed and no ship was damaged. The Luftwaffe tried to intervene but was thwarted by the RAF; the 1st Canadian Division suffered only six losses during its brief excursion to the Continent; five men were reported missing and one man was killed; four of the missing were interned and then made it back to England.

=== Brest ===
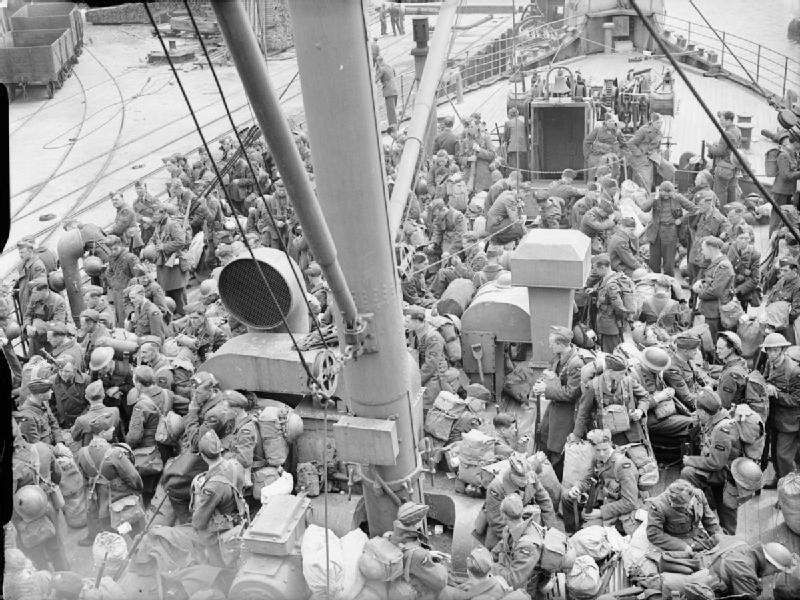
RAF personnel being evacuated from Brest

The evacuation from the southern ports on the Bay of Biscay was commanded by Admiral Sir Martin Dunbar-Nasmith, the Commander-in-Chief of Western Approaches Command based in Devonport. The evacuation was made more difficult by a lack of information from Brest, St Nazaire and Nantes. Brest is a port city in the Finistère département in Brittany in north-west France, where a sense of urgency was communicated by the Cabinet in London and the evacuation was conducted quickly, albeit with some confusion; guns and vehicles which could have been removed were destroyed needlessly. The Germans were known to be in Paris and advancing southwards, but information about German progress was inaccurate, mainly being rumour. The ships, including the Arandora Star, Strathaird and Otranto rescued 28,145 British and 4,439 Allied personnel, mostly RAF ground crew from 16–17 June and the ships with room to spare were sent south to St Nazaire and the French wrecked the harbour facilities with assistance from the British demolition party. The French ships sailed and on 19 June the demolition party was removed aboard the destroyer HMS Broke.

=== St Nazaire and Nantes ===
Location of Nantes in France

Saint-Nazaire in Brittany is a commune in the Loire-Atlantique department and Nantes is the capital of the Pays de la Loire region, in the same département and is the largest city in Brittany. Operations at St Nazaire, at the mouth of the Loire, with strong tides and other hazards to navigation, Nantes 50 miles (80 km) upriver, took place concurrently. Vague and contradictory information led the navy to believe that 40,000–60,000 men were en route to Nantes but not when they would arrive. To lift so many men, Dunbar-Nasmith assembled the destroyers HMS Havelock, HMS Wolverine and HMS Beagle and the liners Georgic, Duchess of York, Franconia, RMS Lancastria, the Polish ships Batory and Sobieski and several commercial cargo ships.

The ships had to anchor in Quiberon Bay, 30 km (20 mi) north-west of the Loire estuary, despite having no anti-submarine defences. The evacuation began on 16 June, with 16,000 troops leaving for home on Georgic, Duchess of York and the two Polish ships. German bombers attacked the bay but were only able to damage Franconia. Loading of equipment continued overnight and more ships from England and Brest arrived, along with two more destroyers, HMS Highlander and HMS Vanoc. The large troopships would have been exceedingly vulnerable, had German bombers been able to make daylight attacks. British fighter cover restricted the Luftwaffe to mine-laying, which only delayed movement until channels were swept. The RAF fighters each flew up to six sorties per day and the final patrol over Nantes was flown by 73 Squadron, then the last airworthy Hawker Hurricane flew to RAF Tangmere.

The last 4,000 British troops left for Plymouth at 11:00 a.m. on 18 June in two convoys comprising 12 small merchant ships; much equipment was abandoned after alarmist reports led to the convoys sailing in haste. In the afternoon, Dunbar-Nasmith heard that 8,000 Polish troops were approaching the port and sent six destroyers and seven troop transports to St Nazaire, which arrived on 19 June but only 2,000 men appeared; no German forces were in hot pursuit. Unserviceable Hurricanes were burned by their ground crews, a staff car was given to a friendly local café proprietor and an airman tried to sell off an Austin 7. The rear parties then departed in transport aircraft, a few hours before German tanks arrived. On the journey home during the night of 17/18 June, Floristan, a merchantman with 2,000 men on board, of the 27,000 troops and civilians in its convoy, was attacked by a Ju 88 but, being under way, dodged the bombs as soldiers fired back with Bren guns and riddled the cockpit. The bomber carried away the mast tops and aerial, then crashed into the sea to the cheers of the rest of the convoy.

==== Lancastria ====
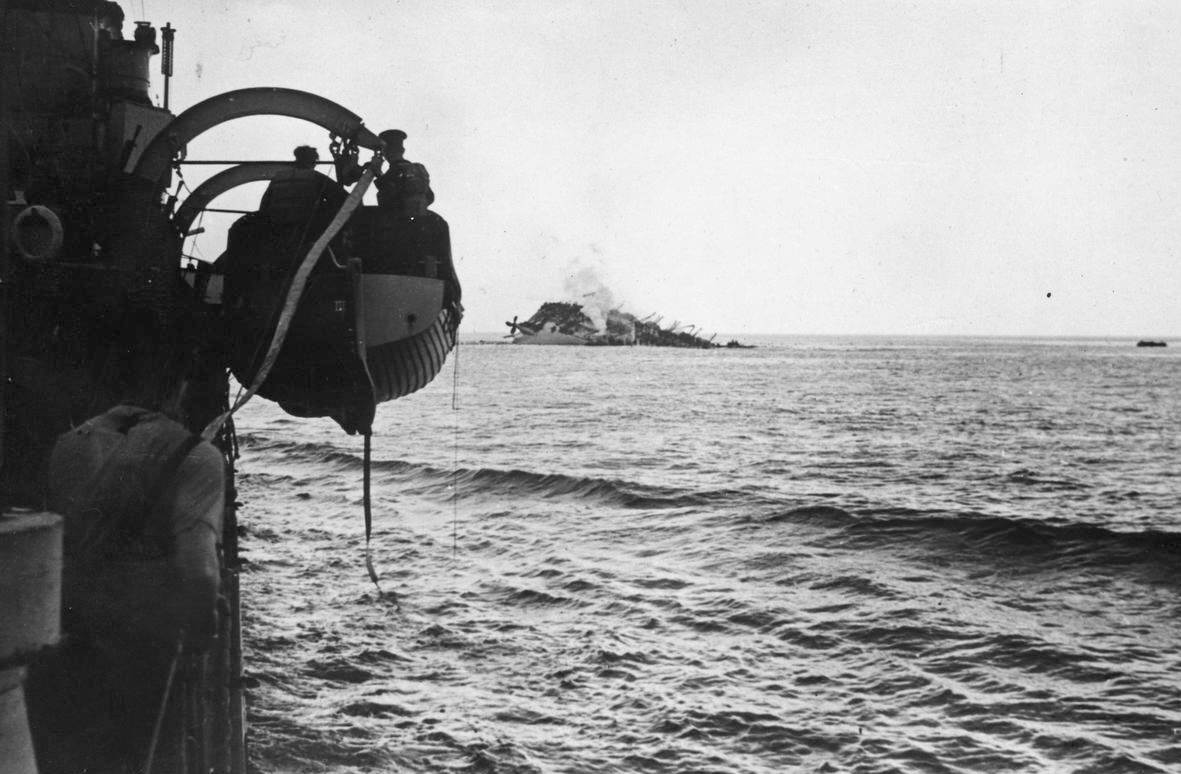
Lancastria sinking off St Nazaire (HU3325)

On 17 June, there were still about 67,000 troops waiting ashore, many at St Nazaire; ferrying men to the big ships offshore resumed early in the morning, soon joined by lighters, tenders and destroyers. The men being transported were reinforcements and lines-of-communication troops, tradesmen, labourers, mechanics and engineers of the Royal Army Service Corps (RASC) pioneers and tradesmen in RAF maintenance units from Nantes aerodrome. Several merchantmen and railway ferries from the Dover–Calais route were among the flotilla off St Nazaire but the largest ship was the 16,243 GRT Lancastria of the Cunard Line. Lancastria was normally permitted to carry 1,700 passengers and 375 crew but in the emergency Captain R. Sharp was ordered to take as many troops as could be crammed on board. Among the military personnel were about 40 civilians, including embassy staff, men from Avions Fairey in Belgium and their families.

As the boarding progressed, a soldier heard Sharp and his chief officer, H. Grattidge, say that 6,700 people were on the ship, as a lighter came alongside and Sharp decided that it would be the last to deliver passengers. Sharp and Grattidge kept watch on the sky as aircraft fought above the Loire estuary and German bombers tried to hit Oronsay about 0.5 mi (0.80 km) distant; at 1:50 p.m., Oronsay was bombed and part of the bridge destroyed. Sharp was advised by the captain of Havelock to leave at once but for fear of U-boats, Sharp wanted a destroyer escort. No destroyer was forthcoming and Sharp decided to leave with Oronsay; Lancastria stayed at anchor rather than being made a moving target. At 3:45 p.m. more German bombers appeared, while the RAF Hurricanes were at the far end of their 30 mi (50 km) patrol line and a bomber hit Lancastria with three or four bombs. The ship tilted to starboard, the bridge crew shouted for everyone to go to the port side and Lancastria came level again, then keeled over to port.

Grattidge called out "Your attention please. Clear away boats"; there were far too few for the number of people on board and some boats had been smashed in the bombing. After the remaining lifeboats had been launched, some sinking in the process after falling into the sea or being swamped, the order "every man for himself" was given. Some men in life jackets jumped overboard from the starboard side and broke their necks, others walked down the side of the hull, where they could see the men trapped inside through portholes and stepped into the water as the ship settled. Once in the water, they were strafed by German bombers, which also dropped flares on patches of oil and burned alive some of the shipwrecked men. While Lancastria was on its side, the hull was covered by men who could not swim, singing Roll Out the Barrel until they sank with the ship, about fifteen minutes after the bombing. As time passed, exhaustion and despair led people in the sea to give up and slip underwater. About 2,477 people were rescued but more than 3,500 men, women and children were killed. (Note: In 2005, Fenby wrote that estimates of the death toll vary from fewer than 3,000 to 5,800 people, the largest loss of life in British maritime history. The British government suppressed news of the disaster on Winston Churchill's orders through the D-Notice censorship system but the story was broken by the Press Association on 25 July. In a 2022 publication, David Worsfold rebutted the story of a D-Notice and an attempt at a conspiracy of silence by Churchill.)

=== La Pallice ===
La Pallice, the grand port maritime de La Rochelle is the commercial, deep water port of La Rochelle. A senior British naval officer arrived by destroyer on 16 June and the evacuation began the next day. The naval officer found 10,000 men and no transports so requisitioned ships in the port, embarked the troops less their transport and departed on 18 June. Ships included the British flagged MV Thistleglen (Captain G. F. Dobson) which embarked 2,500 men and a contingent of British nurses. (Note: Thistleglen was sunk in the battle of the Atlantic during convoy SC42.) Dunbar-Nasmith sent ships twice more, which picked up 4,000 Polish troops on 19 June. Few men were found on 20 June and surplus ships were sent south to the Gironde ports. Most of the British troops in France had gone but more Polish and Czechoslovak troops, embassy and consular staffs, British and other civilians remained.

=== Other Atlantic ports ===
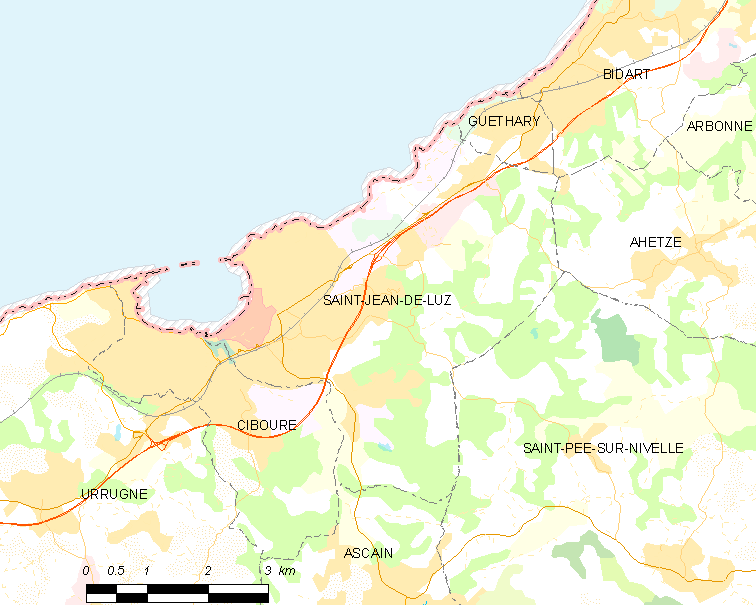
Modern map of St Jean-de-Luz (commune INSEE code 64483)

Bordeaux and Le Verdon-sur-Mer are ports on the Gironde estuary in the Gironde department of Aquitaine. Bayonne at the confluence of the Nive and Adour rivers and St Jean-de-Luz] are ports and communes in the Pyrénées-Atlantiques département, all four ports are on the south-west coast of France. HMS Arethusa was stationed off Bordeaux on 16 June as a wireless (radio) link and on 17 June, British and some Allied ships were cleared for England and the embarkation of Polish and Czech troops and civilians began. A Hunt-class destroyer, HMS Berkeley (Lieutenant-Commander H. G. Walters) had been made available to Reynaud and the French government, also as a venue for discussions with Churchill and on 19 June, the ship evacuated the remaining British Consular staff from Bordeaux.

British diplomatic staff, the President of Poland and his cabinet were given preferential treatment. (Note: Amongst other civilians who escaped via Bordeaux was Charles Howard, 20th Earl of Suffolk, who had rescued the physicists Lew Kowarski, Hans von Halban and Frédéric Joliot-Curie from Paris, together with the entire stock of heavy water, which was being used by them in the early development of a nuclear weapon.) Berkeley was replaced by the cruiser HMS Galatea and sailed for England with the VIPs. Evacuation continued at the nearby ports of Le Verdon at the river mouth and Bayonne, where on 19 June, the Polish ships Batory and Sobieski took about 9,000 Polish soldiers on board and the British Ettrick and Arandora Star took on everyone they could find and sailed for St Jean-de-Luz on 20 June.

The evacuation at St Jean de Luz ended officially at 2:00 p.m. on 25 June, just after the deadline set by the terms of the armistice, with the sailing of the cargo ships SS Baron Kinnaird, SS Baron Nairn and SS Kelso, loaded with troops and civilians; about 19,000 people were lifted from Bayonne and St Jean de Luz, most being Polish troops. On the final day of the operation, the Canadian destroyer HMCS Fraser was accidentally rammed and sunk with many losses by the anti-aircraft cruiser HMS Calcutta in the Gironde estuary. Evacuations continued informally from the Mediterranean coast of France, until 14 August. On 23 June, the Admiralty gave orders that every available ship was to take anyone who could be squeezed on board to Gibraltar, thence to Britain. Small cargo ships organised by two destroyers removed about 10,000 Allied troops and civilians from 24 to 26 June.

== Aftermath ==
=== Analysis ===
Troops and civilians evacuated, 15–25 June 1940
Nationality	Total
British	144,171
Polish	24,352
French	18,246
Czechoslovak	4,938
Belgian	163
Total	191,870
Civilians	30–40,000

In 1953, Lionel Ellis, the British official historian, wrote that by the end of the informal evacuations on 14 August, another 191,870 people had been evacuated, after the rescue of 366,162 men in Operation Dynamo, a total of 558,032 evacuees, of whom 368,491 were British troops. In 2001, Brodhurst wrote that many civilians escaped from French Atlantic and Mediterranean ports to England via Gibraltar and that 22,656 more civilians left the Channel Islands from 19 to 23 June. Brodhurst gave figures of 368,491 British, 189,541 Allied troops and 30,000–40,000 civilians evacuated. (Note: Brodhurst did not write that this was for Aerial or for all evacuations from France but the number is the same as that given by the official historian for the total of British troops evacuated from France.) Although much equipment was lost, equipment recovered included 322 guns, 4,739 vehicles, 533 motorcycles, 32,303 long tons (32,821 t) of ammunition, 33,060 long tons (33,590 t) of stores, 1,071 long tons (1,088 t) of petrol, 13 light tanks and 9 cruiser tanks during Operation Aerial and the earlier evacuations. (Note: The material cost of the campaign was 2,472 guns destroyed or left behind, 63,879 vehicles, 20,548 motor cycles, 76,697 long tons (77,928 t) of ammunition, 415,940 long tons (422,610 t) of supplies and equipment and 164,929 long tons (167,576 t) of petrol were also destroyed or left behind.)

German submarines could have sunk British ships in the Bay of Biscay, many of the troopships were not escorted and out of range of England-based fighters but the seven U-boats in the area did not intervene. The Luftwaffe managed to sink Lancastria but German operations against Aerial showed a lack of co-ordination between the Luftwaffe and Kriegsmarine. Brodhurst wrote that the success of the operation was due to the professionalism of the Royal Navy, the decisions of middle-ranking officers like Bertram Ramsay and the conduct of the navy and civilian crews, who took grave risks to rescue the army.

In 1979, the historian Basil Karslake described the Breton Redoubt affair and concluded that all of the people involved knew of the scheme and all had agreed, albeit with little faith in its success, for it to go ahead. Karslake also reviewed the figures given in the official history of equipment recovered during Operation Aerial. Ellis had included equipment loaded onto ships in England but not landed in France in his figures for material recovered during the operation. Ellis recorded the recovery of 322 guns, 17 of the 51st (Highland) Division from Le Havre, 120 of the 52nd (Lowland) Division from Cherbourg, 24 of the 1st Canadian Division from Brest and 32 guns of the Beauman Division from Cherbourg, 194 guns in all, with 128 more not accounted for. Karslake wrote that some guns may have been on ships sent from England but not unloaded and could not have belonged to the two BEF anti-aircraft brigades south of the Somme; the anti-aircraft brigade protecting the lines-of-communication units and the AASF airfield defence brigade had only 170 guns between them. The 53rd Heavy AA Regiment reached Marseille with its two heavy and one light batteries but could only load the light anti-aircraft guns, due to a lack of cranes and no jumbo derrick on the evacuation ship; the remaining thirteen 3-inch anti-aircraft guns having to be destroyed and left behind. (Note: Karslake disclosed that he was the son of Lieutenant-General Henry Karslake, the commander of the British lines-of-communication troops in 1940 and that he had typed his father's report to the War Office soon after Operation Aerial.)

Of the 4,739 vehicles brought back to Britain, most belonged to the 52nd Lowland and 1st Canadian divisions and had not been unloaded; the rest had been embarked before "panic orders" had been issued to the ports. Of the 32,303 long tons (32,821 t) of ammunition recovered, Karslake had been given a priority list of small-arms ammunition, 25-pounder shells and the chemical warfare equipment dumped at Fécamp. Much of the chemical warfare material had been removed by early June and most of the rest of the ammunition brought back from France could be accounted for by a shipload not unloaded at Cherbourg on 15 June and another laden ship at St Nazaire. Of the 33,060 long tons (33,590 t) of other stores saved, only material returned to Britain during May had been unloaded from ships and the 1,071 long tons (1,088 t) of petrol was on a part-loaded ship which left St Nazaire on 16 June. On 4 June, Karslake had asked the CIGS to stop sending supplies but this request was ignored and troops saw more supplies being unloaded as they loaded ships for the evacuation. The 6th Battalion Royal Sussex Regiment stacked petrol tins in the Fôret de Savernay from 26 May to 15 June and then set fire to it on 16 June.

As the RAF presence in France was reduced, its aviation fuel requirements fell and by 5 June most RAF aircraft had returned to England, yet deliveries continued. British armoured units were also less demanding of fuel as the number of vehicles dwindled, until the main users were the transport echelons of the front-line units and the lines-of-communication troops, which could be supplied by the fuel delivered up to the end of May. Karslake wrote that the small number of armoured vehicles removed from France was a mystery and that a train with the last tanks of the 2nd Armoured Brigade and some of those of the 3rd Armoured Brigade, departed from Le Mans for St Malo and disappeared. It was rumoured that the train had been sidelined by the French and the engine removed for another train but no effort was made by the road parties outside Brest to find their vehicles. No party accompanied the vehicles and no aircraft reconnaissance was sought, even though the Germans were a long way from Brittany.

Karslake wrote that in 1939, the CIGS, General Edmund Ironside, had warned Gort and Dill the Vice-CIGS before the BEF sailed for France, to prepare defence plans for rear areas, quickly to be implemented at communication centres and geographical bottlenecks, for which even the most non-combatant troops must be trained and equipped but during the Phoney War nothing was done. It was fortunate that Brigadier Archibald Beauman, who had been "dug-out" of retirement, was on hand to organise the lines-of-communication troops south of the Somme, as far as anything could be achieved in the emergency. Karslake (jr.) wrote that had General Karslake been furnished with a staff and the power of command over all British troops, rather than this being vested in the cumbersome and disorganised French command system, the disadvantages under which the lines-of-communication troops were burdened could have been alleviated. When Brooke arrived on 12 June to command the British troops in France, he had no faith in military operations, left his staff at St Malo and concentrated on ending the British presence in France as quickly as possible.

=== Casualties ===
From May to June, including the period of Operation Aerial, the Luftwaffe lost 1,284 aircraft and the RAF lost 1,526 men killed, wounded, died of wounds or injury, injured, lost at sea or taken prisoner and 959 aircraft, including 477 fighters, shot down, destroyed on the ground or written off. The AASF lost 229 aircraft, the Air Component 279, Fighter Command 219, Bomber Command 166 and Coastal Command 66 aircraft. In the course of the operations from 5 to 18 June, the AASF lost 13 more Battles, two Blenheims and 15 Hurricanes; Fighter Command lost a Spitfire, 26 Hurricanes and three Blenheims. During the Battle of France, the British army suffered 68,111 casualties, killed, died of wounds, wounded, missing or taken prisoner and 599 men died of injury or illness; navy casualties could not be separated from operations elsewhere in the world. German casualties in the battle (only a few of the Luftwaffe losses occurring during Operation Aerial), were 27,074 killed, 111,034 wounded and 18,384 men missing.

== See also ==
- Dunkirk evacuation
