= Y Division (United Kingdom) =

- Active: Mid February - 16 March 1943
- Country: United Kingdom
- Branch: British Army
- Type: Infantry
- Role: Infantry
- Size: Division

Historian Richard Doherty wrote that the division was created as an ad hoc measure "to achieve stabilisation" followed the Battle of Kasserine Pass on February 19. Brigadier Nelson Russell was given command. Doherty stated that the division comprised the 38th (Irish) Brigade, the 1st Parachute Brigade, one French infantry battalion, and artillery support. H.F. Joslen, compiler of the official history detailing British orders of battle, concurs that the Irish Brigade formed part of the division, but does not list the paratroopers as part of it. He recorded the division included the 1st Infantry Brigade (Guards). The latter joined the division on 27 February, while the Irish Brigade joined on 16 February, likely the formation date of the division. The division was disbanded on 16 March. Richard Doherty wrote that "Russell never did find out why the formation was actually called Y Division".

== Order of battle ==
Y Division

38th (Irish) Infantry Brigade

- 1st Battalion, Royal Irish Fusiliers
- 2nd Battalion, London Irish Rifles
- 6th Battalion, Royal Inniskilling Fusiliers

1st Parachute Brigade

- 1st Battalion, Parachute Regiment
- 2nd Battalion, Parachute Regiment
- 3rd Battalion, Parachute Regiment
- 1st Parachute Squadron, Royal Engineers
- 16th Parachute Field Ambulance, Royal Army Medical Corps
- J Section, 2nd Company, Royal Corps of Signals

1st Infantry Brigade (Guards), joined the division on 27 February and left on 2 March 1943

- 3rd Battalion, Grenadier Guards
- 2nd Battalion, Coldstream Guards
- 3rd Battalion, Welsh Guards (joined 1 March)

Divisional Troops

- Unidentified French infantry battalion
- Support artillery units, including elements of:
  - Ayrshire Yeomanry
  - 7th County of London Brigade, Royal Field Artillery
- Six Churchill tanks, of the North Irish Horse

== See also ==
- List of British divisions in World War II
- British Army Order of Battle (September 1939)
