= Archibald Beauman =

British Army officer (1888–1977)

Brigadier Archibald Beauman CBE DSO*
- Born: 30 November 1888; Paddington, London, England
- Died: 22 March 1977 (aged 88); Surrey, England
- Relatives: Don Beauman (son)
- Military career
- Allegiance: United Kingdom
- Branch: British Army
- Service years: 1908–1938; 1939–1944
- Rank: Brigadier
- Service number: 4119
- Units: South Staffordshire Regiment; York and Lancaster Regiment
- Commands: North Riding District (1943–1944); Catterick Garrison (1941–1942); Beauman Division (1940); 15th Infantry Brigade (1934–1938); 1st Battalion, York and Lancaster Regiment (1928–1932); 20th (Service) Battalion, Durham Light Infantry (1919); 69th Brigade (1918–1919); 1st Battalion, South Staffordshire Regiment (1916–1918)
- Conflicts: First World War; Arab revolt in Palestine; Second World War
- Awards: Commander of the Order of the British Empire; Distinguished Service Order & Bar; Mentioned in Despatches (7); Silver Medal of Military Valor (Italy); War Merit Cross (Italy)

Brigadier Archibald Bentley Beauman, CBE, DSO & Bar (30 November 1888 – 22 March 1977) was a British Army officer, who raised and commanded an improvised force of second-line troops called the Beauman Division early in the Second World War, in an attempt to stem the German Blitzkrieg during the Battle of France.

== Early life and First World War ==
Beauman was born in the Paddington area of London on 30 November 1888, the son of Bentley Martin Beauman (or Baumann), a stockbroker's agent, and his wife Estelle (née Beddington). His younger brother was Eric Bentley Beauman, a Royal Naval Air Service pilot and mountaineer.

Educated at Windlesham House School, Malvern College and the Royal Military College, Sandhurst, Beauman was commissioned as a second lieutenant into the 2nd Battalion, South Staffordshire Regiment in 1908.

Having served in South Africa before the First World War, which began in 1914, Beauman's battalion was amongst the first units of the British Expeditionary Force (BEF) which went to France in August 1914: they were known as the "Old Contemptibles". After being invalided home in November 1914, he returned to the front in January 1915 when he served as Staff Captain, Deputy Assistant Adjutant and Quarter Master General, and then acting lieutenant colonel of the 1st Battalion of the South Staffordshires. In May 1918, after receiving a temporary promotion to the rank of brigadier-general, aged just twenty-nine, he took command of the 69th Brigade of the 23rd Division, which was then serving on the Italian Front. He was made a Companion of the Distinguished Service Order (DSO) for an action during the Battle of Festubert in France on 16 May 1915. The citation for the medal reads:

For conspicuous gallantry and ability at Festubert on 16th May, 1915, when commanding the leading company of his Battalion in the attack. He handled his men with great skill, clearing the trenches to his right with his Company and bombers, and, after reaching the line allotted to the Battalion, entrenched himself and held on under heavy artillery fire during the 16th, 17th and 18th May.

Beauman received a Bar to his DSO in November 1917, the citation for which reads:

For conspicuous gallantry and devotion to duty. When the troops on the right were in difficulties, and communications with Brigade Headquarters broken down, he made dispositions with his own battalion and other troops which ensured the security of the Divisional front. He proved himself to be a leader of exceptional ability.

He was also mentioned in despatches six times and was awarded the Italian Silver Medal of Military Valor and War Merit Cross.

== Between the wars ==
Remaining in the army after the war, Beauman served at the Staff College, Camberley, initially as a student and then as a General Staff Officer (GSO) in India, as Chief Instructor at the Royal Military Academy Woolwich, and commanded the 1st Battalion, York and Lancaster Regiment. Following a spell as the chief instructor in the Small Arms School Corps at Netheravon, he took command of the 15th Infantry Brigade which was deployed to suppress the 1936–1939 Arab revolt in Palestine; Beauman was made a Commander of the Order of the British Empire for his services there in 1937. In 1938, Beauman became an aide-de-camp (ADC) to King George VI and following his retirement in October of that year, was made an Honorary brigadier.

== Second World War ==
On the outbreak of the Second World War, Beauman returned to active service and was appointed Commanding Officer Northern Area with the British Expeditionary Force (BEF) in France, with the rank of (acting) brigadier. Based at Rouen, the main role of his command was managing logistics within the Lines of Communication area. This area was divided from the "forward area" by the River Somme but included a coastal strip up to Dunkirk. With the start of the German offensive in May 1940, Beauman was ordered by Major General Philip de Fonblanque, the general officer commanding lines of communication troops, to strengthen his local defences. He formed a small mobile force, known as "Beauforce", consisting of four Territorial infantry battalions that had been intended to defend communications and undertake pioneer work. On 27 May, Beauman was promoted to temporary major general and ordered to form a new division from "Beauforce" and a similar formation called "Vicforce", together with a third unit called "Digforce", which was composed of infantry reservists that were serving with the Auxiliary Military Pioneer Corps. The new formation was called the "Beauman Division"; this was the only example of a British division being named after its commander since the Peninsular War.

Although supported only by a few field guns that had been under repair in base depots, some of them lacking sights, the division was ordered to defend a 55-mile (89 km) line defined by the small rivers Andelle and Béthune in Upper Normandy. On 8 June, the 5th and 7th Panzer Divisions attacked towards Rouen. Despite desperate fighting, the line was penetrated first at Forges-les-Eaux and then in many other places, so that by that night, Beauman Division had been forced to withdraw across the Seine. The division was eventually evacuated from Cherbourg on 17 June, during Operation Aerial. On arrival in England, the division was dispersed and Beauman relinquished the temporary rank of major general. He was mentioned in despatches for his services.

In 1941, Beauman was appointed Commanding Officer of Catterick Garrison and in 1943 became the District Officer Commanding North Riding District, before finally resuming his retirement in October 1944.

== Family life ==
Archibald Beauman married Eva Dorothy Dunn in 1928. They had a daughter and a son, Donald Beauman, a Formula Two motor racing driver who was killed on 9 July 1955 at the Leinster Trophy race at Wicklow, Ireland, when his Connaught A-type car crashed. Eva died in 1949 and he married Barbara Arnold in 1952. In retirement, Beauman pursued his interest in horse racing, becoming Vice-Chairman of the Racehorse Owners' Association in 1959.

== Bibliography ==
- With the 38th in France and Italy: Being a Record of the Doings of the 1st Battalion South Staffordshire Regiment, from 26th September, 1916, to 26th May, 1918, F H Bull & E Wiseman, 1919.
- Common Mistakes in the Solution of Tactical Problems and how to Avoid Them: Hints to Officers Studying for the Staff College and Promotion Examinations, Hugh Rees Limited, London, 1925.
- A Short Outline Of Modern Tactics, Hugh Rees Limited, London, 1939.
- Then a Soldier (autobiography), P R Macmillan, 1960.
