= Victor Joseph Altmayer =

French general

Victor Joseph Altmayer (1844–1908) was a French general of German descent. He was the father of Robert Altmayer and René Altmayer, both also generals.

He was made a knight of the Légion d'honneur on 7 February 1871, an officer of the order on 5 June 1892. He was promoted to brigadier general and put in command of the 48th Infantry Brigade and the subdivisions of the Angoulême and Magnac-Laval regions on 18 May 1895. He held those posts until 14 August 1900, when he was made commander of 33rd Infantry Division and the sub-divisions of the Agen, Marmande, Cahors and Montauban regions.

He was made a divisional general on 8 March 1901 and a commander of the Légion d'honneur on 30 December 1902. He left his post as commander of 33rd Infantry Division and the related sub-divisions on 30 June 1906 to become commander of 12th Army Corps, a role he held until 1 December 1908. He was also a commander of the Order of Glory.

== Sources ==
- SHAT site: 9 Yd 319
