= Robert Altmayer =

French general (1875–1959)

Marie-Robert Altmayer (1875–1959) was a French army corps general. He was the eldest son of the divisional general Victor Joseph Altmayer (1844–1908) and elder brother of general René Altmayer. They were of German descent.

He commanded cavalry in Algeria in 1929. He then became inspector general of cavalry from 14 October 1932 to 5 October 1936. He was retired on 30 July 1937 then re-mobilised on 21 May 1940 on the orders of general Maxime Weygand. On 24 May he was put in command of 10th Army, with which he tried to hold a front along the river Seine until 14 June, when he shifted to delaying tactics as far as the river Loire. He did not receive his final orders to build a "Breton redoubt" behind a defence line between Saint-Malo and Saint-Nazaire as envisaged by Paul Reynaud and was captured on 19 June. He remained a prisoner until 23 December 1941 and was retired again on 26 February 1942.

== Sources ==
- Général Robert Altmayer: "La Xe Armée sur la Basse-Somme, en Normandie et vers le réduit breton : Mai-juin 1940", Paris, Ed. Défense de la France, 1946
