= René Altmayer =

French general

Félix-René Altmayer (1882–1976) was a French general. His father Victor Joseph Altmayer and elder brother Robert Altmayer were also generals. They were of German descent.

He commanded 5th Army Corps between 15 January and 20 June 1940, then the military region of Montpellier from 17 August 1940 to 7 February 1942, before being retired.

== Biography ==
The youngest son of Major General Victor Joseph Altmayer (his older brother Robert would also become a general), he graduated from École spéciale militaire de Saint-Cyr(85th class, 1900-1902, “Chad class”).

Appointed brigadier general in 1934, he became major general in 1937, heading the newly created 2nd Light Mechanized Division (France). He was promoted to lieutenant general on February 10, 1940, and commanded the 5th Army Corps (France) from January 15 to June 20, 1940.

After the armistice of June 22, 1940, he was appointed head of the 18th military region (Bordeaux) until August 17, 1940, then head of the 16th military region (Montpellier) until February 7, 1942, when he was placed in reserve.

Arrested by the Gestapo, he was deported as a “hostage personality” on August 31, 1943, from Paris to Eisenberg Castle , in Bohemia, along with Pierre de Gaulle, Michel Clemenceau, and Colonel de La Rocque. He was released on May 8, 1945.
