= Operation Cycle =

Evacuation of Allied troops from Le Havre in 1940

- Part of the Battle of France
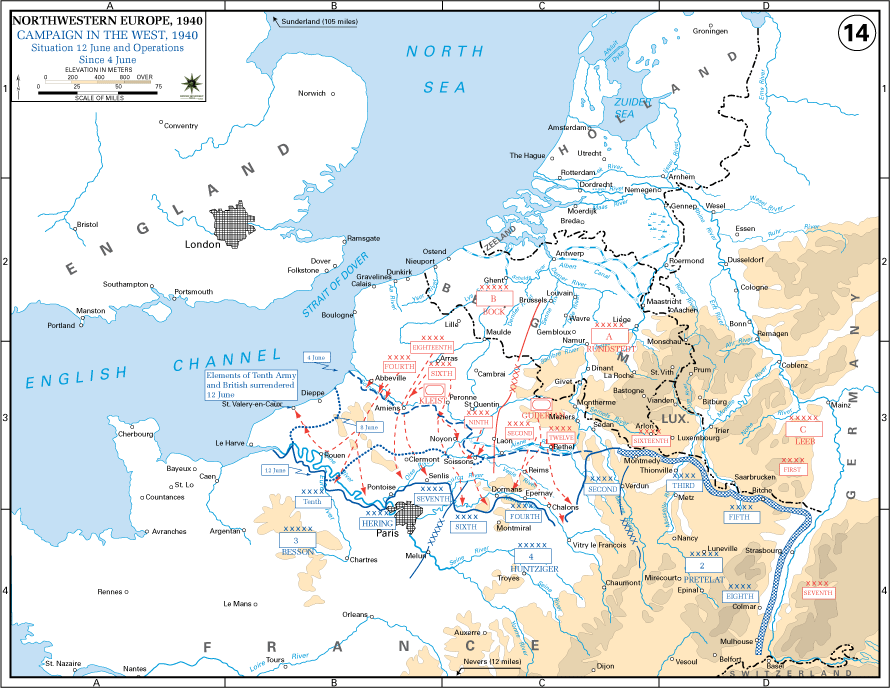
- The German offensive to the Seine, 4–12 June 1940.
- Type: Evacuation
- Location: Le Havre; 49°29′N 00°06′E
- Objective: Withdrawal
- Date: 10–13 June 1940
- Executed by: Royal Navy; French Navy; Allied naval vessels
- Outcome: Allied success

Operation Cycle is the name of the evacuation of Allied troops from Le Havre, in the Pays de Caux of Upper Normandy from 10 to 13 June 1940, towards the end of the Battle of France, during the Second World War. The operation was preceded by the better known rescue of 338,226 British and French soldiers from Dunkirk in Operation Dynamo (26 May – 4 June). On 20 May, the Germans had captured Abbeville at the mouth of the Somme and cut off the main Allied armies in the north. South of the river, the Allies improvised defences and made local counter-attacks to dislodge the Germans from bridgeheads on the south bank and re-capture river crossings, for an advance northwards to regain contact with the armies in northern France and Flanders.

The 1st Armoured Division arrived in France from 15 May, without artillery and less some divisional units that had been diverted to Calais. The division joined the large number of lines-of-communication troops south of the Somme, many of whom were hurriedly organised into the Beauman Division and other improvised units, despite a lack of training and weapons. French troops were sent into the area, as Général d'armée Maxime Weygand attempted to build up a defence in depth on the south bank of the Somme and make bigger attacks to eliminate the German bridgeheads. From 27 May to 4 June, about half of the German bridgehead south of Abbeville was recaptured by Franco-British troops; the Allies were reinforced by infantry divisions and the 4e Division cuirassée (4e DCr, Colonel Charles De Gaulle) but lost many of their tanks and the Germans much of their infantry, some units running back over the river Somme.

When Fall Rot (Case Red), the final German offensive, began on 5 June, the IX Corps of the French Tenth Army (including the 51st (Highland) Infantry Division (Major-General Victor Fortune) of the British Expeditionary Force (BEF) after it arrived from the Saar on 28 May), was pushed back to the Bresle River. On 9 June, German tanks entered Rouen on the Seine, cutting off the IX Corps from the X Corps to the east and from the Seine to the south. The French and British commanders in the pocket decided to make for Le Havre and Fortune detached Arkforce, the equivalent of two brigades, to guard the routes back to the port. During the night of 9/10 June, the remainder of the Highland Division and the French divisions of IX Corps prepared to continue the retreat but found that the 7th Panzer Division (Generalmajor Erwin Rommel) had advanced from Rouen through Yvetot to Cany and Veulettes-sur-Mer on the Durdent river.

With an Allied withdrawal to Le Havre cut off, the Highlanders and the French retreated to St Valery-en-Caux, where from 10 to 11 June, 2,137 British and 1,184 French soldiers were rescued by the Navy. The remainder, including over 6,000 Highlanders, were taken prisoner on 12 June. At Le Havre, from 10 to 13 June, 11,059 British troops from Arkforce, other British units in the port and Allied forces were evacuated; attempts by the Franco-British to prepare a national redoubt in Brittany came to nothing. Operation Cycle was followed by Operation Aerial from 14 to 25 June, in which another 191,870 soldiers were embarked from Cherbourg, St. Malo and other Atlantic and Mediterranean ports, until the Armistice of 22 June 1940.

== Background ==
=== Battle of France ===
On 10 May 1940, the Germans began Fall Gelb an offensive against France, Belgium and the Netherlands. Within a few days, Army Group A (Generaloberst Gerd von Rundstedt) broke through the French Ninth Army (General André Corap) in the centre of the French front near Sedan and drove westwards down the Somme river valley, led by Panzergruppe Kleist made up of the XIX Armeekorps under Generalleutnant Heinz Guderian and the XLI Armee Korps under Generalleutnant Georg-Hans Reinhardt. On 20 May, the Germans captured Abbeville at the mouth of the Somme River, cutting off the Allied troops in Northern France and Belgium. The Battle of Arras, a Franco-British counter-attack on 21 May, led the Germans to continue to attack north towards the channel ports, rather than advance southwards over the Somme. Apprehension about another Franco-British counter-attack led to the Arras halt order being issued by the German higher commanders on 21 May. The neighbouring XV Corps (General Hermann Hoth) was held back in reserve and a division of the XLI Korps was moved eastwards, when the corps was only 31 miles (50 km) from Dunkirk.

=== British lines-of-communication ===
The Somme Valley

Allied forces north of the Somme were cut off by the German advance to St. Omer and Boulogne on the night of 22/23 May, which isolated the BEF from its supply entrepôts at Cherbourg in the Cotentin peninsula, Brittany and Nantes. The Pays de Caux, the coastal area between the Somme and the Seine, was known as the Northern District (Acting Brigadier Archibald Beauman) on the BEF lines-of-communication, with the Dieppe and Rouen districts as sub-areas. (Note: The Pays de Caux in Normandy occupies most of the French département of Seine Maritime in Haute-Normandie. It is a chalk plateau to the north of the Seine Estuary, extending to the cliffs on the English Channel coast, that are known as the Côte d'Albâtre.) Dieppe was the main medical base of the BEF and Le Havre the principal supply and ordnance source. From St. Saëns to Buchy, north-east of Rouen, lay the main BEF ammunition depot and its infantry, machine-gun and base depots were at Rouen, Évreux and L'Epinay. A main railway line linking the bases and connecting them with bases further west in Normandy and with the BEF in the north, ran through Rouen, Abbeville and Amiens. Beauman was responsible for base security and guarding 13 airfields being built for the RAF, with troops drawn from the Royal Engineers, Royal Army Ordnance Corps, Royal Corps of Signals and older garrison troops.

Below the Seine in the Southern District, were three Territorial divisions and the 4th Border Regiment, 4th Buffs and the 1st/5th Sherwood Forester lines-of-communication battalions, which were moved into the Northern District on 17 May as a precaution. Rail movements between these bases and the Somme quickly became difficult, due to congestion and German bombing, the trains from the north mainly carrying Belgian and French troops and the roads filling with retreating troops and refugees. Beauman lost contact with the BEF GHQ and was also unable to discover if Allied troops were going to dig in on the Somme or further south. On 18 May, Major-General Philip de Fonblanque, commanding the lines-of-communication troops, ordered Beauman to prepare defences in the Northern District. Beauforce was improvised from the 2nd/6th East Surrey of the 12th (Eastern) Infantry Division, 4th Buffs, four machine-gun platoons and the 212th Army Troops Company RE.

Vicforce (Colonel C. E. Vickary) took over five provisional battalions created from reinforcement troops in infantry and general base depots, which held plenty of men but few arms and little equipment. Beauforce was sent to Boulogne on 20 May by road but the Germans had already cut off the port and it returned to the 12th (Eastern) Infantry Division near Abbeville. When German troops captured Amiens on 20 May and then began patrolling south of the river, their appearance caused panic and alarmist rumours, in the absence of reliable information. Beauman ordered the digging of a defence line along the Andelle and Béthune rivers, the most effective tank obstacles south of the Bresle river, to protect Dieppe and Rouen against an attack from the east. Bridges were prepared for demolition and obstacles placed on the approaches.

=== Battle of Abbeville ===
On 20 May, the 2nd Panzer Division advanced 56 mi (90 km) to Abbeville on the English Channel, overran the 25th Infantry Brigade of the 50th (Northumbrian) Infantry Division and captured the town at 8:30 p.m. Only a few British survivors managed to retreat to the south bank of the Somme. At 2:00 a.m. on 21 May, the III Battalion, Rifle Regiment 2 reached the coast, west of Noyelles-sur-Mer. The 1st Armoured Division (Major-General Roger Evans) had arrived in France from 15 May without artillery, short of an armoured regiment and the infantry of the Support Group, which had been diverted to Calais. From 4 June to 4 July the Franco-British forces south of the Abbeville bridgehead, held by the German 2nd Panzer Division, then the 57th Infantry Division, recaptured about half of the area; the Allied forces lost many of their tanks and the Germans much of their infantry, some units running back over the River Somme. On 5 June, the German 4th Army attacked out of the remains of their bridgeheads south of the Somme and the Franco-British divisions opposite, drastically depleted by their counter-attacks of the previous four weeks, were pushed back to the Bresle with many casualties.

== Prelude ==
=== Allied defensive preparations ===
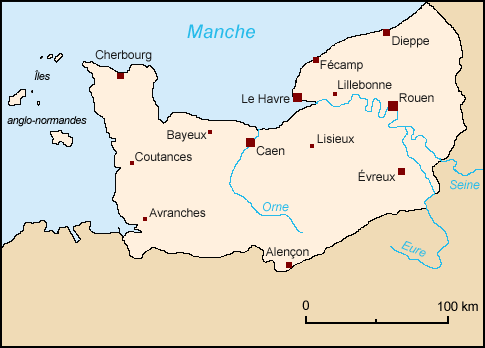
Normandy

The French armies and the "2nd BEF" were operating on interior lines and were closer to their bases and supplies. About 112,000 French troops from Dunkirk had returned to France via the ports of Normandy and Brittany and the 100,000 British troops in the area had been reinforced by about 60,000 fighting troops from England. The French had also managed to replace many of their tank and other armoured vehicle losses for the 1e and 2e DCr (heavy armoured divisions) and the 4e DCr had its losses replaced and French morale experienced something of a revival by the end of May.

Most French soldier replacements had not experienced the débâcle in the north and officers returned from Dunkirk had gained tactical experience against German mobile units and discovered that tank-for-tank, French vehicles were superior to their German equivalents, having thicker armour and better guns; the French artillery had also performed well. From 23–28 May, the Seventh Army and the Tenth Army (General Robert Altmayer) were rebuilt and Weygand adapted to German tactics with defence in depth and delaying tactics, to inflict maximum attrition on German units. Villages, towns and cities were fortified for all-round defence, to serve as hedgehogs with the new infantry, armoured and half-mechanised divisions held back, ready to counter-attack and relieve surrounded units, which were to hold out at all costs.

=== German offensive preparations ===
On 21 May, Colonel General Franz Halder, the Chief of the Oberkommando des Heeres (OKH) General Staff, submitted to Hitler Fall Rot (Case Red), a campaign plan for the final defeat of France, which after amendment was adopted on 31 May. On 5 June, Army Group A was to attack either side of Paris towards the Seine and the main attack by Army Group B (Colonel General Fedor von Bock) was to begin the main attack east of Paris on 9 June towards Rheims and then after about a week, Army Group C (Colonel General Wilhelm von Leeb) was to attack through the Maginot Line and the Upper Rhine. The three army groups would then converge on the Plateau de Langres south-east of Paris and on the rear of the Maginot Line. Army Group B had 36 infantry, one cavalry, four motorised infantry, six panzer divisions and two motorised infantry brigades. Army Group A had 39 infantry, two motorised infantry and four panzer divisions. The 4th Army, 6th Army and 9th Army were controlled by Army Group B and the 2nd Army, 12th Army and 16th Army by Army Group A; the 18th Army (General Georg von Küchler) with four divisions, was to remain at Dunkirk. Army Group C had 24 infantry divisions and 22 infantry divisions were held in OKH reserve. Seven divisions were left in eastern Germany and seven garrisoned Norway.

The motorised infantry and panzer divisions were concentrated into two groups of two corps each, Panzergruppe Guderian in Army Group A and Panzergruppe Kleist (General Ewald von Kleist) in Army Group B along with the XV Corps. The plan was based on the traditional concept of Vernichtungsgedanke (annihilation theory) in which Bewegungskrieg (battles of manoeuvre) would lead to the encirclement and destruction of the opposing armies. The panzer groups were not to be used in independent operations but subordinated to the armies, despite having the same size and importance. Panzergruppe Guderian came under the 12th Army (Colonel General Wilhelm List), Panzergruppe Kleist the 6th Army (Colonel General Walter von Reichenau) and XV Corps under the 4th Army (Colonel General Günther von Kluge). Despite protests from Guderian, List planned the attack over the Aisne as an infantry operation, with the panzer divisions held back to exploit the breakthrough. Extensive redeployments were necessary and Panzergruppe Guderian moved 200 mi (320 km) to its start line, after travelling 300 mi (480 km) during the drive to Dunkirk, the troops beginning to show great tiredness and the vehicles wear and tear. The Luftwaffe made strategic attacks from 1–4 June (towards the end of the Dunkirk evacuation), against the Parisian aircraft industry and fuel dépôts around Marseille, then resumed close support operations for the army for Fall Rot. (After the occupation of the capital on 14 June, Luftwaffe operations concentrated on the Channel Ports south of the Somme and the Atlantic ports, towards which the BEF was retreating.)

==== 4th Army plan ====
On the German right flank, against the French Tenth Army, the 4th Army of Army Group B was to attack with the 5th Panzer Division, 7th Panzer Division, the 57th Infantry Division, 31st Infantry Division, 12th Infantry Division, 32nd Infantry Division, 27th Infantry Division, 46th Infantry Division and the 6th Infantry Division and the 2nd Motorised Division, the 11th Motorised Brigade and the 1st Cavalry Division. Advancing on a line from Abbeville to Amiens, with a flank guard on the left facing Paris, the main force was to make for the lower Seine, quickly to capture Le Havre and bridgeheads at Rouen, Les Andelys and Vernon. An advance beyond the Seine to the south or south-west was to wait on events.

== Fall Rot ==
=== 5 June ===
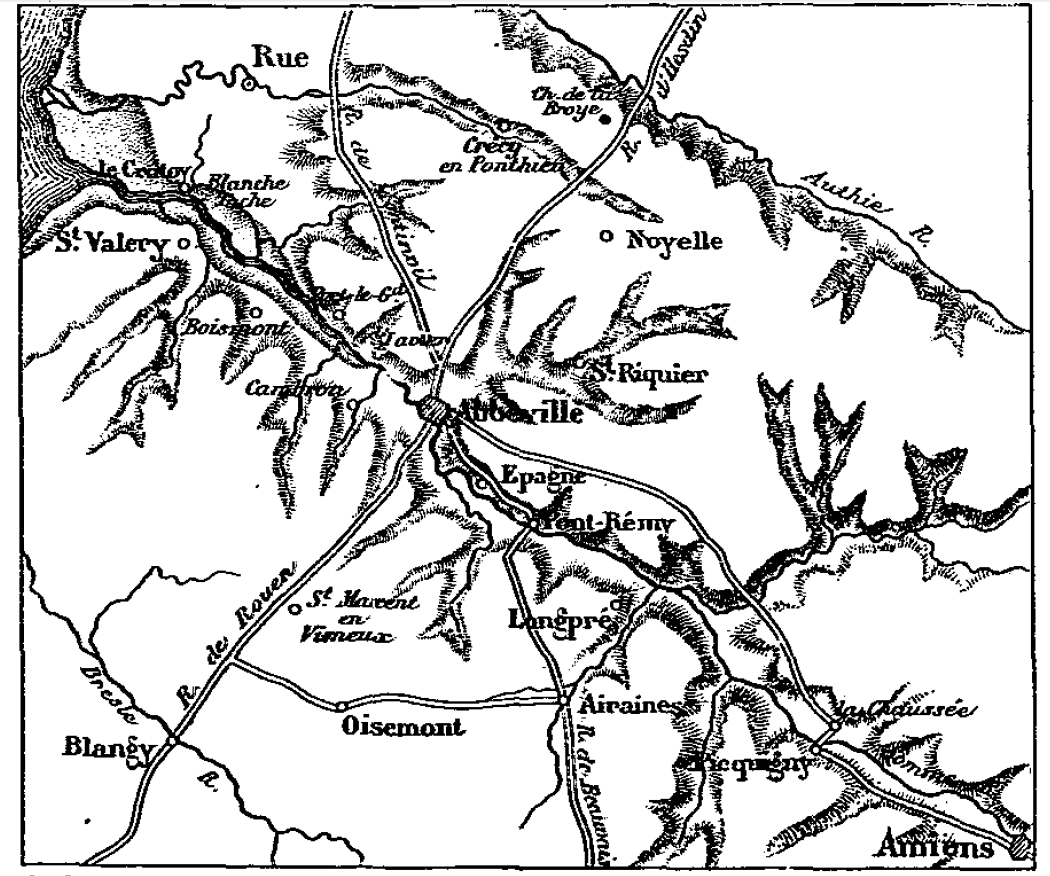
Relief map of the Somme valley near Abbeville

On 5 June, Fall Rot (Case Red), a German offensive to complete the defeat of France began and Army Group A attacked either side of Paris towards the Seine. The 4th Army offensive on the Somme began at 4:00 a.m. opposite the 51st (Highland) Division at St. Valery sur Somme. German infantry moved forward against Saigneville, Mons, Catigny, Pendé, Tilloy and Sallenelle held by the 7th and 8th battalions, Argyll and Sutherland Highlanders (Argyll), as other troops passed between them, the villages being too far apart for mutual support. Saigneville, Mons, Catigny, Pendé and Tilloy fell late in the afternoon and the 7th Argyll were surrounded at Franleu, by troops infiltrating between Mons and Arrest. The 4th Black Watch in reserve, were ordered forward to relieve Franleu but were stopped by German troops at Feuquières and an Argyll company sent forward was surrounded at the edge of Franleu. By dark, the remnants of the 154th Infantry Brigade had been pushed back to a line from Woincourt to Eu. (Note: The 7th Argyll commander sent out most of the wounded and others by lorry that evening and the rest were overwhelmed later on; the Argyll company held on for 24 hours before being overrun.)

On the right, the 153rd Infantry Brigade was bombed by Ju 87 Stuka dive-bombers along with the mortar and artillery-fire used on the rest of the front. The German infantry pushed the battalion back to Tœufles, Zoteux and Frières, where British machine-gun and artillery fire stopped the advance. The French 31st (Alpine) Division was forced back parallel to the British from Limeux to Limercourt and Béhen, with the 152nd Infantry Brigade on the right from Oisemont to the Blangy–Abbeville road. The 1st Lothian and Border Horse at Bray were attacked and fell back east of the village of Oisemont. The Composite Regiment had several engagements and had tank losses before rallying at Beauchamps on the Bresle. The 51st Highland and 31st (Alpine) divisions had tried to hold a 40 mi (64 km) front and were so depleted after the bridgehead attacks up to 4 June, that the 1st Black Watch had to hold a 2.5 mi (4.0 km) front, in close country. The British troops held on until overwhelmed or retreated under the cover of their artillery, which also held on until the last moment before retiring.

The 51st (Highland) Division HQ requested air support from the South Component HQ at Boos but the three AASF fighter squadrons were down to 18 airworthy aircraft and lost another four during the morning. Big Luftwaffe attacks had been expected on the industrial town of Rouen, a rail and road centre and Anglo-French base of operations; 1 Squadron and French fighters intercepted a raid early in the morning and shot down several aircraft but the remainder got through and bombed Boos aerodrome and an army camp. Another raid in the evening was caught by 501 Squadron but managed to bomb the airfield and camp again, the main bridge, power station, railway and factories. Bombing by the AASF and Bomber Command took place further east and during the night, 103 aircraft attacked German communications in France and oil and transport targets in Germany.

=== 6 June ===
Bresle river valley

During the night, Fortune wrote to Marshall-Cornwall, the War Office liaison officer at the Tenth Army HQ, asking for reinforcements and permission to retreat with the 31st (Alpine) Division to the Bresle but no more troops were left. Marshall-Cornwall prevailed upon Altmayer to agree to a retreat to the Bresle, where the 31st (Alpine) Division would hold from Senarpont to Gamaches and the 51st (Highland) Division from there to the sea, a front of 12.5 mi (20.1 km). On 6 June, the day passed with German attacks on Oisemont supported by artillery and bombing, that were repulsed by the 1st Lothian and the 2e Division Légère de Cavalerie (2nd DLC, Colonel Berniquet) in a costly defensive success. Attacks further away were repulsed by artillery and small arms fire, except at Beauchamps. Infiltration attempts around Eu and Ponts-et-Marais were only just repulsed by the Composite Regiment of the 1st Armoured Division.

The Composite Regiment moved on to Eu and counter-attacked the infiltrations there. Later in the day, the 40th Division moved up beyond the Bresle from Senarpont to Aumale to reinforce parties of Royal Engineers and an anti-tank battery. During the day, reports arrived that German tanks had broken through on the right, that turned out to be alarmist rumours but the 5th and 7th Panzer divisions had attacked towards Rouen and their leading elements had got beyond the Poix–Rouen road, with the 2nd Motorised Division following. The 6th Infantry Division was advancing on the German left and the 32nd Infantry Division on the German right was 10 mi (16 km) away. The IX Corps position on the Bresle was vulnerable to being cut off in the Havre peninsula. A brigade group of the 52nd (Lowland) Division was due from England on 7 June and the War Office urged the French command to arrange a line of retreat south-east, away from the dead-end of Le Havre, towards the BEF lines of communication south of the Seine.

Weygand had forbidden a retirement, ordering the Bresle to be held come what may. Earlier, 12 Blenheims with air cover flew from England to attack German columns moving towards the Somme crossings and lost five aircraft. Later in the day, 24 Blenheims bombed bridges and roads from Abbeville to St. Valery-sur-Somme for no loss. Fighters of the AASF patrolled Rouen and during the evening flew sorties over the IX Corps area. In the afternoon, two fighter squadrons had flown from England to Boos airfield, refuelled and patrolled the battlefront but arrived after the German raids on Oisemont and Millebosc. Weygand also appealed for more fighters and the Air Ministry issued warning orders to several squadrons, as 67 Bomber Command and 17 AASF aircraft raided German communications and oil targets that night.

=== 7 June ===
Arques river and vicinity

A Brigade of the Beauman Division, with about 3,000 men of the 4th Buffs, 1st/5th Sherwood Forester and 4th Border battalions, was sent to reinforce the 51st (Highland) Division (whose 152nd, 153rd and 154th Infantry brigades had suffered 80, 60 and 25 per cent casualties) and took over on the left; the remnants of the 152nd Infantry Brigade moved into reserve in the Haute forêt d'Eu. (Note: Karslake contradicted the official history total of 900 reinforcements.) By 7 June, the 51st (Highland) Division had taken up the new position on the Bresle and was in contact with the 31st (Alpine) Division on the right, which reverted to French command. The river made a good defensive position, particularly at the mouth where the banks had been flooded, forming a good tank obstacle and the only vulnerable points were at Eu and Ponts de Marais. During the day, the 4th Border and a company of the 1st/5th Forester attacked the German pocket on the south bank but only managed to push back the Germans to the north-west end of the Haute forêt d'Eu. The 1st Lothian and the Composite Regiment were moved up as a precaution and for the rest of the day the Allied forces skirmished with the Germans opposite.

To the south-east, the situation continued to deteriorate and Fortune liaised with the 31st (Alpine) Division, to make sure that the limitations of the Support Group (Brigadier F. E. Morgan), 1st Armoured Division were understood. (The day before, the 1st Armoured Division had come under the command of Almayer at the Tenth Army HQ.) The Support Group was separated from the 51st (Highland) Division by the 31st (Alpine) Division, 40th Infantry Division, the 2e DLC and the 5e DLC. During 7 June, Evans met Marshall-Cornwall and Lieutenant-General Henry Pownall the former Chief of Staff of the BEF, who was over from England. It was known by then that the 5th Panzer Division had broken through the French from Grandvilliers and Formerie and overrun British troops south of the Aumale. Other parts of the Support Group on the Aumale–Serqueux front had defeated an attack but the panzers had then attacked south-west near Forges; the remains of the Support Group were withdrawn into the Basse Forêt d'Eu. The 5th and 7th Panzer divisions had already outflanked the Bresle line and the 1st Armoured Division units were ordered up to Gournay-en-Bray to make a flank attack on the German penetration. The division had 41 cruiser tanks and 31 light tanks in the 3rd Armoured Brigade, six light tanks of Queen's Bays and the 10th Royal Hussars mounted in lorries of the 2nd Armoured Brigade, after refitting since the May offensive against the German Somme bridgeheads.

During the evening, Général d'armée Maxime Weygand, arrived at the Tenth Army HQ and told the Franco-British officers that the Tenth Army was fighting the decisive battle of the war, that as there were no reserves and all depended on the 1st Armoured Division holding 10 mi (16 km) of the Andelle line from Nolleval to Serqueux, as French formations counter-attacked from the south. Evans explained that it was a division in name only, its artillery, anti-tank guns and infantry having been detached and that the tanks were not suited to static defence and were already moving up for a counter-attack on the German flank. Weygand was unmoved, only giving permission for the division to retreat over the Seine if it was pushed back from the Andelle. Evans had to countermand the counter-attack, while some units were already engaging the Germans 5 mi (8.0 km) north-west of Gournay. By dawn on 8 June, the panzers were close to Rouen and IX Corps on the Bresle was on the brink of being cut off.

=== 8 June ===
==== Bresle ====
On the Bresle, German troops did little while they waited for the panzer divisions to envelop the southern flank of the IX Corps defence line. The 4th Border and 1st/5th Forester continued their attempts to expel the Germans from positions in the Haute forêt d'Eu but only managed to prevent the Germans from taking more ground and there was skirmishing around Beauchamps. At dawn, the German panzer divisions resumed their attack towards Rouen. By this time the 51st (Highland) Division and the reinforcement of A Brigade from the Beauman Division was holding the line of the Bresle from Gamaches to Eu under the command of the divisional headquarters. The 1st Armoured Division had been broken up as soon as it arrived in France and without the detachments to Calais had taken part in the Allied offensive against the German bridgeheads south of the Somme. Since then, a Composite Regiment from the 2nd Armoured Brigade had remained with the 51st (Highland) Division and was covering the Haute forêt d'Eu. The rest of the 2nd and 3rd Armoured brigades had been reduced by losses to improvised units and held part of the Andelle line from Nolleval to Serqueux and the remnants of the Support Group was in the Basse forêt d'Eu under the command of the 51st (Highland) Division. B and C brigades of the Beauman Division were defending the Béthune–Andelle line from the Seine to Dieppe. (Note: The 51st (Highland) Division was under the command of General Ihler, IX Corps, Tenth Army, the 1st Armoured Division was under General Altmayer, the Tenth Army commander and also acting on the orders of Weyagand and the Beauman Division was under General Karslake, who answered to General Georges, commander of the French Armies of the North-East. Weygand had told Evans that a retreat should be towards the Seine, not Le Havre and Beauman received similar orders from Karslake but there was no co-ordination between the commands or one commander with authority to begin a general retreat.)

==== Andelle ====
The panzer divisions attacked at Forges and Sigy-en-Bray, where French refugees and stragglers had been passing through, making it impossible to close the road blocks and a column of French tanks was allowed through, which turned out to be captured vehicles with German crews. The "French" tanks attacked the defences from the rear as the main German force attacked frontally, capturing Serqueux, losing it to a counter-attack and then regaining it. Sigy was bombarded and dive-bombed and the tanks of the 1st Armoured Division and the Beauman Division infantry were pushed back. Further north, Neufchatel was in flames and panzers reached Mathonville and pressed on towards the Neufchatel to L'Epinay and Rouen road. Earlier, the Composite Regiment in Haute forêt d'Eu had been ordered back to the 1st Armoured Division to guard the left flank of the defenders on the Andelle line and arrived at L'Epinay at 2:30 p.m. but before the regiment could take post, German panzers and troops arrived on the road from Serqueux, 12 mi (19 km) away. For three hours the Composite Regiment resisted German attacks and was then pushed back.

The rest of the 5th Panzer Division had advanced towards Rouen and at 4:00 a.m. engaged Syme's Battalion at Isneauville, which had been dive-bombed earlier in the day. The battalion, that had been improvised from reinforcement drafts only a week previous, had laid dannert wire and planted land-mines and after artillery preparation, resisted for three hours, preventing the Germans from reaching Rouen and claimed many infantry casualties, twelve tanks knocked out, six paratroops, an aircraft and a field gun. The battalion then made a fighting withdrawal to the Seine. During the afternoon and night, the remnants of the 1st Armoured Division and the Beauman Division also retreated over the Seine, which left only the 51st (Highland) Division and part of the Support Group on the north side. Weygand ordered the IX Corps to retreat to Les Andelys and Rouen, which had already fallen. Ihler received the orders as the Tenth Army HQ was out of touch while moving closer to Paris and gave the divisional commanders a retirement programme in which Rouen was to be reached in four days, despite the German spearheads being only four hours from the city.

==== Seine ====
On 6 June Syme's Battalion had arrived comprising soldiers from the base reinforcement depot and the 2nd/4th King's Own Yorkshire Light Infantry (2nd/4th KOYLI) and 2nd/6th Duke of Wellington's (2nd/6th Duke's) battalions of the 46th Division, that had been recovering since the loss of Abbeville on 20 May, had taken up positions around Rouen, Syme's Battalion with four 2-pounder anti-tank guns and a machine-gun platoon around Isneauville, the 2nd/4th KOYLI on a bridge over the Seine and the 2nd/6th Duke's along the railway south of Boos. The Beauman Division had little artillery and its ill-equipped infantry was dispersed in about 50 mi (80 km) of ground from the south-east of Rouen on the Seine to St. Vaast on the Béthune and in positions around Rouen. In some places they were close to parties of the 1st Armoured Division and at others with French troops all under separate command, with few means of liaison. Refugees and stragglers on the roads made it impossible to close roads or prevent infiltration and led Beauman to give a general order, that troops were to hold for as long as possible and that brigadiers were to use their discretion, as to when a retreat to the south of the Seine had become necessary. (During the afternoon and night, the last of the 1st Armoured Division and the Beauman Division retreated over the river.)

=== 9 June ===
During the morning, German tanks entered Rouen, to find that French and British troops had left and blown the Seine bridges. IX Corps on the Bresle began to retire as the German armoured forces turned north. Fortune had divided the 51st (Highland) Division to leapfrog backwards; the 153rd Brigade and A Brigade were to retreat to a line from Envermeu to Belleville-sur-Mer as the 154th and 152nd Brigades assembled on the Béthune further back. The Royal Army Service Corps made double trips to move the troops but some took until mid-morning on 9 June, to reach the new positions. (Resistance at two of the Bresle crossings by D Company of the 4th Border and A Company of the 1st/5th Sherwood Forester, which did not receive the retreat order, may have slowed a German follow-up, the two companies holding on for another six days until on 13 June, they realised that hostilities north of the Seine had ended.) The survivors of the Support Group in the Basse forêt d'Eu joined the remains of the 2e DLC and 5e DLC in Forêt d'Eawy. The Tenth Army HQ has lost contact with IX Corps and the 51st (Highland) Division lost contact with everyone, until a dispatch rider arrived from Le Havre with a message from the British commander in Le Havre, that the Port admiral had reported that the Germans had reached Rouen. Fortune conferred with Ihler and both agreed to retreat to Le Havre.

On the night of 9/10 June, the rest of the 51st (Highland) Division blew the bridges over the Arques and the Eaulne, where the Germans promptly attacked. The 4th Seaforth and the 1st Black Watch managed to hold on, despite attacks at Arques la Bataille and Martigny, where the artillery repulsed several German advances. The panzer divisions had turned north from Rouen towards Dieppe and captured the Arkforce wireless lorry near Carny on the Durdent river at 11:00 a.m. The river was the next position the 51st Highland Division was to retire to after dark and a reconnaissance by the 1st Lothian found the Germans on the river crossings at Veulettes-sur-Mer close to the coast too. German tanks were reported 6 mi (9.7 km) from divisional headquarters that afternoon and rear parties moving westwards preparatory to the retreat that night, ran into German troops. At 5:30 p.m. HMS Ambuscade, part of the destroyer force that had been giving the division fire support for several days, was damaged by German artillery on the cliffs near St. Valery-en-Caux and HMS Boadicea was hit while embarking troops from the beach; IX Corps had been cut off from Le Havre.

== Operation Cycle ==
=== St Valery-en-Caux ===
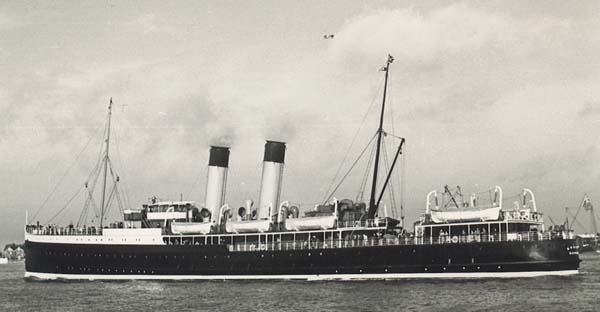
Pre-war photograph of SS Bruges

Admiral William James, the Commander-in-Chief Portsmouth, had arrived at Le Havre on 10 June, ordered destroyers to reconnoitre the smaller ports to the east and learned of the damage to Ambuscade and Boadicea; James signalled to the Admiralty that he planned to lift a large number of men from the port and that it must be done that night, if at all. The retreat to the coast began after dark and the last troops left the Béthune at 11:00 p.m. without challenge. Fortune signalled to the War Office that there were two days' rations left and that evacuation from St Valery to the mouth of the Durdent would be necessary. Units were ordered to dump non-essential equipment and guns were reduced to 100 rounds each to make room on the RASC transport for the men. The night move was difficult as French troops, many horse-drawn, encroached on the British route and alarmist rumours spread.

Fortune and Ihler set up near Veules-les-Roses to direct troops and by the morning of 11 June, IX Corps had established defensive positions around St Valery. French transport continued to arrive at the perimeter and it was difficult in some places to recognise German troops following up, which inhibited defensive fire. That evening, the captain of Codrington was ordered to begin the evacuation and two hours later, Fortune signalled that it was probably now or never. Troops not needed to hold the perimeter moved down to the beaches and the harbour but no ships arrived, because thick fog prevented them from moving inshore. An armada of 67 merchant ships and 140 small craft had been assembled but few had wireless and the fog prevented visual signalling; only at Veules-les-Roses at the east end of the perimeter, were many soldiers rescued, under fire from German artillery, which damaged the destroyers HMS Bulldog, Boadicea and Ambuscade. Near dawn, the troops at the harbour were ordered back into the town and at 7:30 a.m., Fortune signalled that it might still be possible to escape the next night, then discovered that the local French commander had negotiated a surrender.

=== Le Havre ===
Channel Coast ports

On 9 June, the French port Admiral at Le Havre sent word to the 10th Army and the 51st Highland Division that the Germans had captured Rouen and were heading for the coast. Ihler, the IX Corps commander and Fortune, decided that the only hope of escape was through Le Havre and abandoned the plan to retire through Rouen. The port admiral requested enough ships from the Admiralty to remove 85,000 troops but this contradicted the plans given by Weygand for the IX Corps retirement and Dill hesitated, ignorant that delays in issuing the orders had made the retreat plan impossible. Karslake had also urged several times that the retirement be accelerated but had no authority to issue orders. Only after contacting the Howard-Vyse Military Mission at Weygand's headquarters, to report the request from the Le Havre port Admiral and then receiving a message during the night from Fortune, that the 51st (Highland) Division was participating in a retreat by IX Corps towards Le Havre, did Dill learn the true situation.

Fortune detached a force to guard Le Havre comprising the 154th Infantry Brigade, A Brigade of the Beauman Division, two artillery regiments and engineers, named Arkforce (Brigadier Stanley-Clarke) after the village of Arques-la-Bataille, where it was formed. Arkforce moved on the night of 9/10 June towards Fécamp, where most had passed through before the 7th Panzer Division arrived. A Brigade managed to force its way out but lost the wireless truck intended to keep contact with the 51st (Highland) Division. The possibility of holding a line from Fécamp to Lillebonne was discounted and Stanley-Clarke ordered Arkforce on to Le Havre. A Royal Navy demolition party had been in Le Havre since late May and the port was severely bombed by the Luftwaffe on 7 June; two days later, the Admiralty sent orders for an evacuation. Admiral William James, the Commander-in-Chief, Portsmouth sent a flotilla leader, HMS Codrington across the channel, accompanied by six British and two Canadian destroyers, smaller craft and many Dutch coasters (known as schuyts).

A hasty plan was made to block Dieppe harbour and on 10 June, HMS Vega (Captain G. A. Garnon-Williams) escorted three blockships to the port. Two were sunk in the approach channel but the third ship hit a mine just outside, which prevented it being sunk at the entrance to the inner harbour. (James had signalled that many IX Corps troops would probably be trapped against the sea near St. Valery, where he had assembled flotillas of smaller craft under the local Senior Naval Officer.) Beach parties landed at Le Havre to take control of the evacuation on 10 June and after a 24-hour postponement, the evacuation began on 11 June. The embarkation was hindered somewhat by the damage to the port caused by Luftwaffe bombing; the troopship SS Bruges, was hit and beached, the electric power was also cut, rendering the cranes on the docks useless. Ramps were tried for vehicle loading but it was too slow. On 12 June, RAF fighters began patrolling the port and deterred more raids and an attempt was made to save the transport and equipment by diverting it over the Seine via the ferry crossings at Caudebec or the ships at Quillebeuf at the river mouth. The quartermaster of the 14th Royal Fusiliers succeeded in getting the transport away.

== Aftermath ==
=== Evacuations ===
A total of 2,137 British and 1,184 French soldiers were lifted from Veules-les-Roses but the remainder, including over 6,000 men of the 51st (Highland) Division, were taken prisoner on 12 June by the 7th Panzer Division (General Erwin Rommel). The 7th Panzer Division continued its advance through Normandy and reached Cherbourg on 18 June. The greatest number of troops were removed from Le Havre on the night of 12/13 June and the evacuation was completed by dawn; of the 11,059 British troops evacuated, 9,000 men of A Brigade of the Beauman Division were taken to Cherbourg and the 154th Infantry Brigade sailed via Cherbourg to England.

=== Analysis ===
Army Group B had attacked either side of Paris with 47 divisions including the majority of the mobile units and for the first 48 hours, the French withstood the German attacks. The 4th Army captured bridgeheads over the Somme but the attack on the Aisne failed against the French defence in depth. At Amiens, the Germans were repulsed several times by French artillery fire. Late on the third day of the offensive the Germans managed to cross the Somme and Aisne despite bombing by the Armée de l'Air (French Air Force). The German success was costly and French troops resisted from woods and other cover, where the Germans had broken through. South of Abbeville, the German XV Corps avoided the woods roads and villages, to move over the slightly undulating country where there were few ditches, the tanks leading and infantry vehicles following. The Tenth Army was broken through and retreated to Rouen and southwards along the Seine. German spearheads were vulnerable to flank attacks but Luftwaffe operations obstructed French attempts to concentrate and the fear of air attack negated the mass and mobility of the French armies.

On 6 June, documents recovered from a dead German officer, gave the German programme for 7 and 8 June. Beauman, Evans and Marshall-Cornwall discussed the find at the Tenth Army HQ but Karslake was omitted, despite being the senior British officer in France. German forces were to reach the area of Forges-les-Eaux in the area of the Beauman Division and capture Rouen on 8 June. During the meeting, the isolated position of the 51st (Highland) Division and doubts about French assurances, were discussed and the view was taken that the division was doomed. Karslake had already made representations to the CIGS about the lack of unity of command but on 6 June, Dill had written to the Swayne Mission at Georges's HQ that Brooke could be expected the following week and that the 52nd (Lowland) Division was due soon. Dill sent Pownall to France to discuss the new BEF with the French and to liaise with British commanders and Karslake told him that it was vital to withdraw the 51st (Highland) Division before it was too late. Karslake also urged Pownall to get Lieutenant-General Alan Brooke to France and establish a corps headquarters, to unify the command of all British forces, not necessarily under the authority of Altmayer, the Tenth Army commander. Although Brooke had been placed in command of the new BEF on 2 June, he remained in Britain until 12 June, by when the 51st (Highland) Division had been trapped and forced to surrender along with the rest of IX Corps.

=== Subsequent operations ===
==== 2nd BEF ====
Brooke had returned from Dunkirk on 30 May and on 2 June, was told by Field Marshal John Dill to go back to France to assemble another BEF, with the 51st (Highland) Division and 1st Armoured Division that were already in France. The 52nd Lowland Division and the 1st Canadian Division from Britain, were to be followed by the 3rd Division as soon as it was re-equipped. The II Corps headquarters had been spread around Britain after its return from Dunkirk and his first choice of chief of staff was busy with Lord Gort the former BEF commander, writing dispatches. Brook warned Dill and the Secretary of State for War, Anthony Eden that the enterprise was futile, except as a political gesture. Brook was told that on return to France he would come under the authority of Weygand. In France, Fonblanque was still in command of the lines-of-communication troops of the original BEF and lieutenant-generals Henry Karslake and James Marshall-Cornwall were assisting with command. A brigade group of the 52nd Lowland Division departed for France on 7 June but Brooke took until 12 June to arrive.

On 13 June, the RAF made a maximum effort to help the French armies that had been broken through on the Marne. The Germans were across the Seine in the west and the French armies near Paris fell back, dividing the Tenth Army, part on the channel coast and the rest retiring towards Paris. The German advance threatened the airfields of the AASF, which was ordered to retreat towards Nantes or Bordeaux, while supporting the French armies for as long as they kept fighting. The AASF flew armed reconnaissance sorties over the Seine from dawn and German columns were attacked by a force of 10 Battles, then a second formation of 15 Battles and then 15 Blenheims. On the Marne, 12 Battles attacked a concentration of German troops and tanks, followed by an attack by 26 Battles, which lost six shot down and then a third attack by 15 Blenheims from Bomber Command that lost another four. RAF attacks continued through the night, with 44 sorties over the Seine, 20 north of Paris, 41 on the Marne and 59 against road and rail communications and against woods reported by the French to be full of German troops. Fighter sorties had been hampered by bad weather and were limited to coastal patrols.

Next day attacks resumed against German units south of the Seine but the weather had worsened and fewer sorties were flown. A raid by 24 Blenheims with fighter escort was made on Merville airfield for a loss of seven aircraft and ten Fighter Command squadrons patrolled twice in squadron strength or provided bomber escorts, in the biggest effort since Dunkirk, as fighters of the AASF patrolled south of the Seine. During the night, 72 bombers attacked German marshalling yards, forests and dropped mines in the Rhine, for a loss of two aircraft. The remnants of the 1st Armoured Division and two brigades of the Beauman Division were south of the river, along with thousands of lines-of-communication troops but only the 157th (Highland Light Infantry) Brigade of the 52nd (Lowland) Division, which had commenced disembarkation on 7 June, engaged in military operations, occupying successive defensive, positions under command of the Tenth Army. The French armies were forced into divergent retreats, with no obvious front line; on 12 June, Weygand had recommended that the French government seek an armistice, which led to the abortive plan to create a defensive zone in Brittany.

On 14 June, Brooke was able to prevent the rest of the 52nd (Lowland) Division being sent to join the 157th Infantry Brigade and during the night he was informed that he was no longer under French command and must prepare to withdraw the British forces from France. Marshall-Cornwall was ordered to take command of all British forces under the Tenth Army as Norman Force and while continuing to co-operate, withdraw towards Cherbourg. The rest of the 52nd (Lowland) Division was ordered back to a defence line near Cherbourg to cover the evacuation on 15 June. The AASF was also directed to send the last bomber squadrons back to Britain and use the fighter squadrons to cover the evacuations. The German advance over the Seine had paused while bridges were built but the advance began again during the day, with the 157th Infantry Brigade engaged east of Conches-en-Ouche with the Tenth Army. The army was ordered to retreat to a line from Verneuil to Argentan and the Dives river, where the British took over an 8 mi (13 km) front, either side of the Mortagne-au-Perche–Verneuil-sur-Avre road. German forces followed up quickly and on 16 June, Altmayer ordered the army to retreat into the Brittany peninsula. Operation Aerial, the final Allied evacuation, had begun on 15 June.

==== Breton redoubt ====
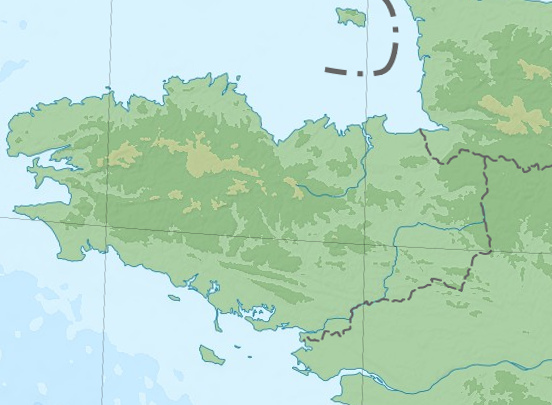
Topographical map of Brittany

On 29 May, the Prime Minister of France, Paul Reynaud, replied to Weygand, rejecting his recommendation that an armistice be considered and asked him to study the possibility that a national redoubt could be established around a naval port in the Brittany peninsula, to retain freedom of the seas and contact with French allies. The idea was discussed by the French and British governments on 31 May and an operational instruction was drawn up on 5 June, in which Lieutenant-General Alan Brooke was appointed to command the new BEF ("2nd BEF") being prepared for France. Plan W, the original plan to land the BEF in 1939 was used, with the 52nd (Lowland) Infantry Division being directed to Cherbourg, to assemble at Evreux, ready to support the 51st (Highland) Infantry Division (major-General Victor Fortune), north of the Seine. On 6 June, Weygand issued orders to begin work on the redoubt, under the command of General René Altmayer. (Note: Brother of Robert the Tenth Army commander.)

German forces crossed the Seine on 9 June, cutting off the 51st (Highland) Division north of the river, two days after 52nd (Lowland) Division had begun to land and the assembly of the division was changed to Rennes in Brittany; the 157th (Highland Light Infantry) Brigade which arrived first, was directed to Beaumont near Le Mans, the rest of the division to follow on. The 1st Canadian Infantry Brigade of the 1st Canadian Infantry Division began its arrival at Brest on 11 June and was sent to Sablé-sur-Sarthe, on the assumption that two fresh divisions would be enough to allow the Tenth Army and attached British troops to retreat through them and take up positions prepared around the Brest peninsula. That day, the Anglo-French Supreme War Council met at Briare and General Charles de Gaulle (Minister of War) was sent to Rennes to survey progress on the redoubt; on 12 June, De Gaulle reported that Quimper would be a favourable place for the government to retreat to, since it would be easy to take ship to England or Africa, since the prospect of maintaining a redoubt in Brittany was non-existent.

Altmayer had reported that work had begun on defences, civilian labour had been recruited and 3,000 Polish troops had arrived to begin work, despite a lack of civil engineering machinery. Churchill visited France for the last time on 13 June, met Reynaud and approved the project. Brook had visited the 1st Canadian Division in England to give the gist of the plan and met Weygand and Georges at Briare on 14 June. It was agreed that the plan was futile but the will of the civilian leadership must be respected and a joint agreement was signed. Brook telephoned Dill in London to find that no agreement had been made with the French and after checking called with the news that "Mr. Churchill knew nothing about the Brittany project". Churchill was of the view that the new corps forming in France should stay, at least until the final French collapse and then return through the nearest port. Without the support of the 52nd Division on the left flank, the Tenth Army was cut off from Brittany, when two German divisions got into the peninsula first and forced the French line of retreat south to the Loire. French troops already in the area were able to join the main French force, after the Canadians had departed for England.
