= 1st Argyll and Bute Artillery Volunteers =

British Territorial Army unit

1st Argyll & Bute Artillery Volunteers 4th Highland (Mountain) Brigade, RGA 51st (West Highland) Anti-Tank Regiment 254th (West Highland)Anti-Tank Regiment
- Active: 1860–1955
- Country: United Kingdom
- Branch: Territorial Army
- Type: Artillery Regiment
- Role: Garrison artillery Coastal artillery Mountain artillery Field artillery Anti-tank artillery Anti-aircraft artillery
- Part of: 51st (Highland) Infantry Division
- Garrison/HQ: Oban; Lochgilphead; Rothesay; Dunfermline
- Engagements: Gallipoli; Salonika; Saint-Valery-en-Caux; North Africa; Sicily; Normandy; Arnhem; Rhine Crossing

Commanders
- Honorary Colonel: J D S Duke of Argyll, KT, KCMG, VD, 18 July 1900

The 1st Argyll & Bute Artillery Volunteers was a part-time unit of the British Army's Royal Artillery formed in Scotland in 1860 in response to a French invasion threat. It 1908 it became the only Mountain Artillery unit in the Territorial Force, and saw action at Gallipoli and Salonika during the First World War. Before the Second World War, it became the first Territorial anti-tank unit. One of its successor units was captured at Saint-Valery-en-Caux, during the Battle of France, but others saw action in the campaigns in North Africa, Sicily, and in North West Europe from D Day to VE Day. The latter included the Battle of Arnhem and the crossing of the Rhine. It continued in the postwar Territorial Army until 1955.

== Artillery Volunteers ==
The enthusiasm for the Volunteer movement following an invasion scare in 1859 saw the creation of many Rifle and Artillery Volunteer Corps composed of part-time soldiers eager to supplement the Regular British Army in time of need. The 1st Administrative Brigade, Argyll Artillery Volunteers, was formed with headquarters (HQ) at Oban, on 10 October 1861 to include the following corps of Argyllshire Artillery Volunteer Corps (AVCs):

- 1st Corps formed at Easdale on 7 March 1860 (two batteries)
- 2nd Corps formed at Tarbert, Loch Fyne, on 12 April 1860 (disbanded 1862)
- 3rd Corps formed at Oban on 8 March 1860
- 4th Corps formed at West Tarbert on 12 April 1860; moved to Dunmore 1864, and Ronachan 1866 (disbanded 1874)
- 5th Corps formed at Ardgour on 16 January 1861 (one subdivision, disbanded in 1865)
- 6th Corps formed at Campbeltown on 11 February 1861 (Increased to two batteries, 1870)
- 7th Corps formed at Port Ellen, Islay, on 3 July 1861
- 8th Corps formed at South Hall on 10 September 1861; moved to Castle Toward 1878.
- 9th Corps formed at Tobermory, Mull on 15 May 1862 (Reduced to a half -battery, 1874).
- 10th Corps formed at Lochgilphead on 15 May 1862
- 11th Corps formed at Tarbet on 13 February 1866
- 12th Corps formed at Inveraray on 2 April 1867 (Recruited from men of the Furnace Quarries)

The 1st Bute Artillery Volunteers at Rothesay (raised on 20 March 1862) joined the unit on 20 March 1863, and the 2nd Bute Artillery Volunteers from Millport, Cumbrae, joined on formation on 5 October 1867. In 1864, brigade HQ moved to Lochgilphead, then, in 1870, to Rothesay. On 25 May 1880, the brigade was consolidated as the 1st Argyll and Bute Artillery Volunteers, with twelve and a half batteries, distributed as follows:

- Nos. 1 and 2, Easdale (late 1st Argyll)
- No. 3, Oban (late 3rd Argyll)
- Nos. 4 and 5, Campbeltown (late 6th Argyll)
- No. 6, Port Ellen, Islay (late 7th Argyll)
- No. 7, Castle Toward (late 8th Argyll)
- No. 8, Rothesay (late 1st Bute)
- No. 9, Millport (late 2nd Bute)
- No. 10, Lochgilphead (late 10th Argyll)
- No. 11, Tarbert (late 11th Argyll)
- No. 12, Inveraray (late 12th Argyll)
- Half-battery, Tobermory, Mull (late 9th Argyll) (disbanded in 1887)

In 1887, a new 12th battery was formed at Rothesay, and in the following year the 8th Battery moved to Dunoon.

=== Royal Garrison Artillery ===
In 1882, all the artillery volunteers were affiliated to one of the territorial garrison divisions of the Royal Artillery (RA) and the 1st Argyll & Bute AVC became part of the Scottish Division. In 1889, the structure was altered, and the corps joined the Southern Division. In 1899, the RA was divided into separate field and garrison branches, and the artillery volunteers were all assigned to the Royal Garrison Artillery (RGA). When the divisional structure was abolished, their titles were changed, the unit becoming the 1st Argyll & Bute Royal Garrison Artillery (Volunteers) on 1 January 1902, with its HQ at Tarbert.

During the South African War in 1900, 211 men of the 1st Argyll and Bute volunteered their services, but only eight were accepted for active service.

The corps was one of the most scattered in Britain. For example, No 6 Company had detachments at Bowmore, Bridgend, and Ardbeg. Personnel of the corps were spread over fifteen localities in some of the largest and least accessible country in Scotland. Owing to the varying occupations of the men, 75% were Gaelic-speaking, three training camps were arranged at different times of the year. In addition, the corps had to maintain 15 carbine ranges. Many prizes were won by the corps, both in gun practice and repository exercises, at the Scottish National Artillery Association camps - the King's Cup was won at Barry Buddon in 1903 by the Easdale companies. The pipe band consisted of over thirty pipers.

== Territorial Force ==
When the Volunteers were subsumed into the new Territorial Force (TF) under the Haldane Reforms of 1908 the bulk of the personnel of the 1st Argyll & Bute RGA (V) formed IV (4th) Highland (Mountain) Brigade, RGA, while the remainder formed one company of the Forth and Clyde Royal Garrison Artillery. The new brigade, which included the Lochcarron, Ross-shire, company from the former Highland Artillery Volunteers, was the only TF mountain artillery unit. It formed part of the Highland Division and had the following organisation:

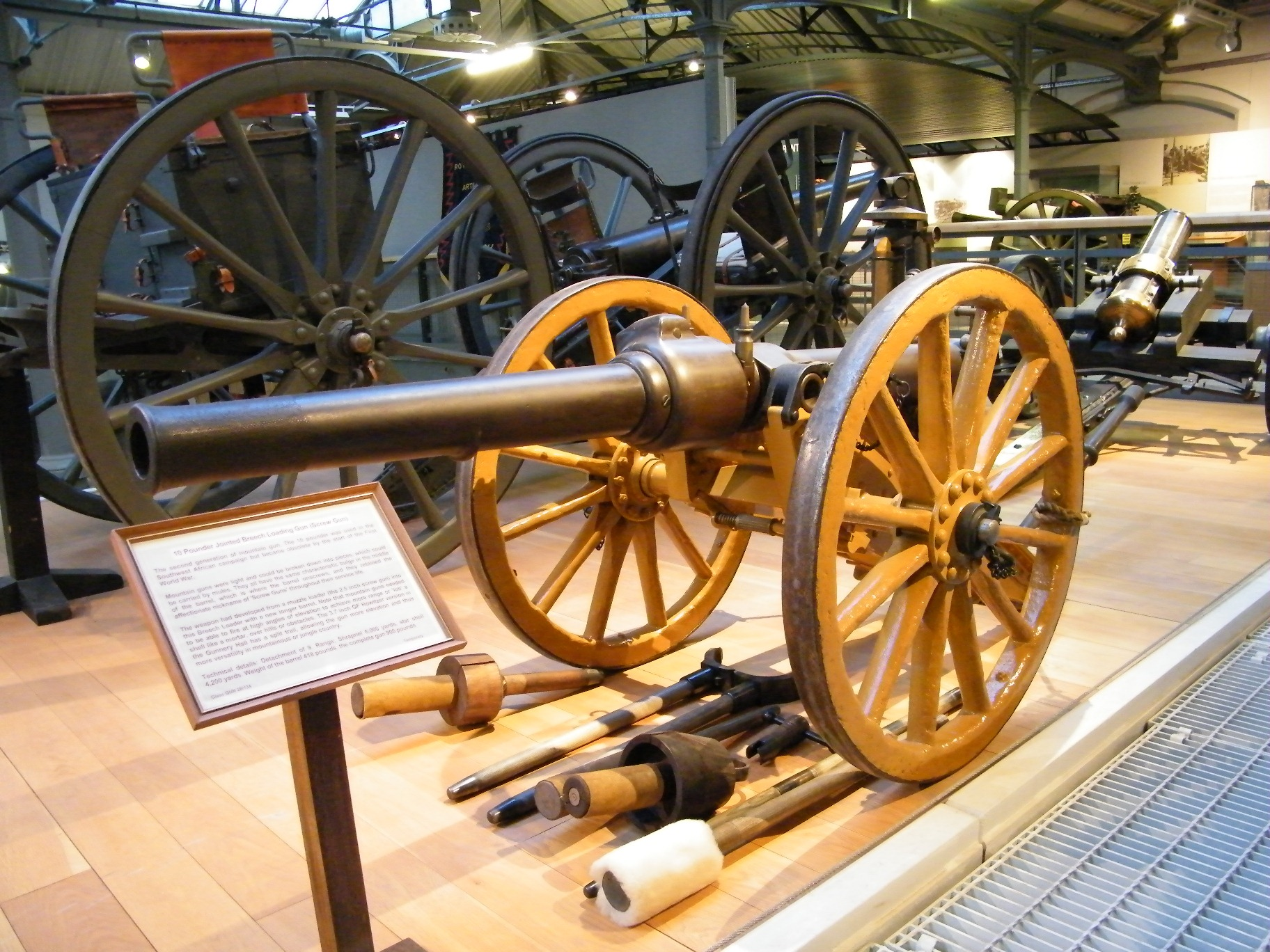
10-Pounder mountain gun preserved at the Royal Artillery Museum.

IV Highland (Mountain) Brigade, RGA

- HQ at Russell Street, Rothesay
- Argyllshire (Mountain) Bty at Campbeltown
- Ross and Cromarty (Mountain) Bty at Lochcarron
- Buteshire (Mountain) Bty at Rothesay
- 4th Highland (Mountain) Ammunition Column at Tarbert

The batteries were equipped with the 10-pounder mountain gun, a 2.75-inch calibre 'screw gun' originally developed for the Indian Army's mountain batteries.

== First World War ==
=== Mobilisation ===
The Highland Division received a warning order for mobilisation on 29 July 1914, and the order to mobilise was received at 17.35 on 4 August. IV Highland Mtn Bde arrived at Bedford on 10 August, where the division concentrated over the following days. During the winter of 1914–15, a number of units left the division to join other formations in the field. On 10 March 1915 IV Highland Mtn Bde (except the Bute Bty) transferred to the 29th Division. This was a new division formed mainly from Regular Army units returned from stations round the Empire, and was allocated to the forthcoming Dardanelles operation. The battery left from Avonmouth Docks on 16 March, bound for Malta and then Alexandria, where it disembarked.

=== Gallipoli ===
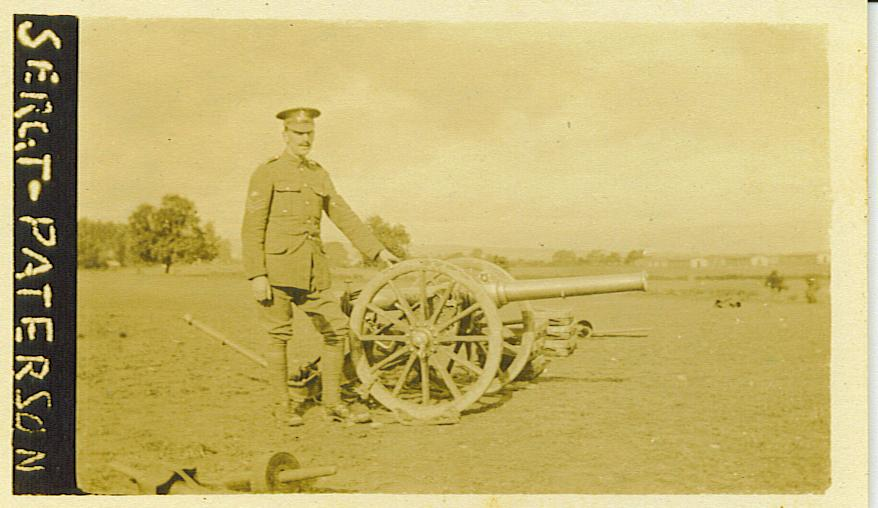
Sgt Paterson, 4th Highland (Mountain) Brigade, with 10-pdr mountain gun ca 1915.

29th Division re-embarked at Alexandria and landed at Cape Helles on the Gallipoli Peninsula at 07.00 on 25 April 1915. IV Highland Mtn Bde and its two batteries served through the difficult opening weeks of the campaign with 29th Division, including the 1st, 2nd and 3rd Battles of Krithia and the Battle of Gully Ravine, before transferring to 11th (Northern) Division on 29 July. The 11th was a newly arrived formation of 'Kitchener's Army' volunteers recruited since the outbreak of war. It was concentrating on the island of Imbros for a fresh landing on the peninsula at Suvla Bay, which was carried out on 7 August. This landing was no more successful than the first, and the campaign bogged down again. Once at Suvla, the Argyll Battery transferred to the command of another Kitchener formation, the 10th (Irish) Division, on 8 August, followed by the rest of the brigade on 13 August.

The IV Highland Bde fought with 10th (I) Division through the campaign, including the Battle of Hill 60 and the following trench warfare. When the division was withdrawn on 30 September, the artillery, including IV Highland Bde, remained in action until the final evacuation of Suvla on the night of 19/20 December, when every gun was successfully withdrawn without loss.

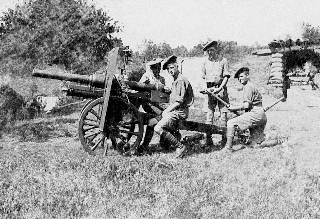
Men of the IV (Highland) Mountain Brigade with 2.75-inch mountain gun at Kamberli, Salonika, June 1918.

=== Salonika ===
After the evacuations from Gallipoli, the troops were transported back to Egypt for rest and reorganisation. The IV Highland Bde was classed as 'Army Troops' with the Egyptian Expeditionary Force in the Suez Canal defences. In September 1916, the brigade was sent to Salonika as reinforcements for the Macedonian front. The Bute Battery, which had remained behind in Scotland and later England with the second line troops of the Highland Division (later the 64th (2nd Highland) Division), sailed direct from England to Salonika, disembarking on 20 September. Each mountain battery in Macedonia had four of the improved 2.75-inch mountain guns.

The Macedonian Front was another area of stationary trench warfare until late in the war, when the final offensive began on 1 September 1918. IV Highland Bde and its batteries were allocated to different formations as required. The brigade was with 28th Division from December 1916 until 22 July 1918, when the Bute Bty went to 27th Division. The rest of the brigade left 28th Division on 10 September to come under XVI Corps before joining 26th Division on 23 September. The Bute Bty left 27th Division on 8 September when it went to XVI Corps, returning on 23 September. On 25 September, the battery rejoined IV Highland Bde, which had left 26th Division and was then operating with 14th Greek Division as the campaign came to a successful end.

== Interwar ==
When the TF was reconstituted on 7 February 1920, the brigade re-formed as 1st Highland Mountain Bde, RGA, under the command of Lt-Col W.H. Macalpine-Leny, DSO, with HQ at the Drill Hall at Tarbert. The TF was reorganised as the Territorial Army (TA) in 1921 and the brigade was redesignated as the 26th Highland Pack Brigade, RGA in January 1922. The Bute Bty (initially listed as 102 (Howitzer) (Bute) Pack Bty) had a Cadet Corps affiliated to it. The RGA was subsumed into the Royal Artillery (RA) in 1924. The brigade (which was the only 'pack' unit in the TA) changed its number to 13th, with the following organisation:

- HQ, Drill Hall, Tarbert
- 49th(Argyll) Bty, Drill Hall, Oban
- 50th (Bute) Bty, Drill Hall, Rothesay
- 51st (Ross) Bty, Drill Hall, Stornoway

The brigade changed its designation again from 'Pack' to 'Light' in 1927, but it underwent a more fundamental reorganisation in 1936 when it was converted into a field artillery unit as 54th (West Highland) Army Field Brigade (the regiment and batteries re-used numbers from a Hampshire-based field regiment that had recently been converted to the anti-aircraft role):

- HQ, Drill Hall, Tarbert
- 214 (Argyll) Field Bty, Campbeltown
- 215 (Bute) Field Bty, Drill Hall, Rothesay
- 219 (Ross) Field Bty, Drill Hall, Stornoway
- 371 (Oban) Field Bty, Drill Hall, Oban, formed February 1937

However, this was short-lived: by the late 1930s, a need for specialist anti-tank (A/T) artillery had been recognised, and on 28 November 1938 the regiment (as RA brigades were termed from that year onwards) became the first such unit in the TA as 51st (West Highland) Anti-Tank Regiment.

- Regimental HQ (RHQ) at 130 George Street, Oban
- 201 (Argyll) Anti-Tank Battery at Campbeltown
- 202 (Bute) Anti-Tank Battery at Rothesay
- 203 (Ross) Anti-Tank Battery at Drill Hall, Stornoway
- 204 (Oban) Anti-Tank Battery at Oban

== Second World War ==
=== Mobilisation ===
The TA was doubled in size following the Munich Crisis of 1938, with existing units splitting to form duplicates before the outbreak of the Second World War. 51st A/T Regiment reorganised as follows:

51st (West Highland) A/T Rgt

- RHQ at 130 George Street, Oban
- 201 (Argyll) A/T Bty at Campbeltown
- 202 (Bute) A/T Bty at Rothesay
- 203 (Ross) A/T Bty at Stornoway
- 204 (Oban) A/T Bty at Oban

61st (West Highland) A/T Rgt

- RHQ at Rothesay
- 241 (Highland) A/T Bty
- 242 (Oban) A/T Bty
- 243 A/T Bty
- 244 A/T Bty

The establishment of an A/T battery at this time was 12 x 2-pounder guns organised in Troops of four guns.

=== 51st (West Highland) A/T Regiment ===
51st (West Highland) Anti-Tank Rgt mobilised at Oban under Lt-Col C.N. Roney-Dougal, MC, a Regular RA officer, and trained at Bordon Camp before crossing to France on 2 February 1940 to join the British Expeditionary Force (BEF) with 51st (Highland) Division.

On 22 April, the division was sent for a tour of duty with 3rd French Army on the Saar Front, and took over a section of the line in front of the Maginot Line forts by 6 May.

==== Battle of France ====
The Battle of France began on 10 May with the German invasion of the Low Countries. While the rest of the BEF responded by executing the pre-arranged Plan D and advanced to defend Belgium, 51st (H) Division stayed on the Saar Front, which remained quiet until 13 May. At 04.00 that morning the Germans began a heavy bombardment, and strong probing attacks were driven off. Attacks on the following days were half-hearted. On the night of 22/23 May, the division was relieved in the line. By now, German troops had reached Boulogne and cut off most of the BEF, and 51st (H) Division was ordered to move west to link up with the British 1st Armoured Division operating south of the Somme.

51st (H) Division held the line of the Bresle, but was very stretched: one battery of 51st (WH) A/T Rgt had to cover 9 miles (14 km) of the river. Attacks by the division against a German bridgehead over the Somme were unsuccessful, and at 04.00 on 5 June the enemy attacked all along the division's front. The Bresle line was outflanked by German Panzers racing for Rouen, and the division received orders to withdraw during the night of 8/9 June. During 9 June, the division was cut off, and that night an ad hoc brigade group formed at Arques-la-Bataille and known as Arkforce was sent back to protect the approaches to Le Havre, where Operation Cycle was under way to evacuate base troops. Arkforce was formed around 154th Infantry Brigade and accompanied by 204 (Oban) A/T Bty. It set off during the night of 9/10 June, but shortly after it arrived the rest of 51st (H) Division was cut off from Le Havre. The division moved back to Saint-Valery-en-Caux where there was a chance that it could be evacuated. But Erwin Rommel's 7th Panzer Division broke through to the cliffs overlooking the harbour. 201 (Argyll) Bty fought furiously to prevent this, but one by one its guns were put out of action. 51st (Highland) Division was forced to surrender on 12 June. All of 51st (WH) Anti-Tank Regiment except 204 (Oban) Bty became prisoners of war and the regiment ceased to exist. (Note: 203 Anti-Tank Bty was reformed in 31st Independent Bde Gp. On 31 July 1940, it exchanged with 223 A/T Bty from 56th (King's Own) A/T Rgt, and served with that unit and with 55th (Devon) LAA/AT Rgt in the Burma Campaign. 233 Anti-Tank Bty later became 1 Air-Landing A/T Bty.)

=== 204 (Oban) Anti-Tank Battery ===
Arkforce was successfully evacuated from Le Havre the day after the surrender of the rest of the division at St Valery. 204 (Oban) Bty was under the command of Maj Donald Carmichael, who refused to allow the men to embark until their precious 2-pdrs were safely aboard. Arkforce was taken first to Cherbourg Naval Base, where a new BEF was to be formed, then evacuated to the UK on 15 June (Operation Aerial) after that attempt was abandoned.

Back in the UK, 204 became an independent A/T Bty with 29th Independent Infantry Brigade Group, a new formation made up of Regular infantry battalions brought back from India. As one of the few fully equipped formations in the UK, the brigade served with XII Corps in the most threatened area of South East England during the 'invasion summer' of 1940, then in the West Sussex County Division along the South Coast from November 1940. When the West Sussex Division moved away in February 1941, 29th Bde remained guarding the South Coast under IV Corps and South Eastern Command. 204 (Oban) Bty left on 5 May 1941 when the brigade came under War Office control to prepare for overseas service.

204 (Oban) Independent A/T Bty was with 1st (Guards) Independent Brigade Group between 11 April and 5 August 1942. When that brigade was assigned to 78th Division assembling for Operation Torch, the battery transferred on 5 August to 1st Airborne Division. On 23 October 1942, it was redesignated 2 (Oban) Air-Landing A/T Bty, equipped (with 6-pounder A/T guns) and trained for glider operations.

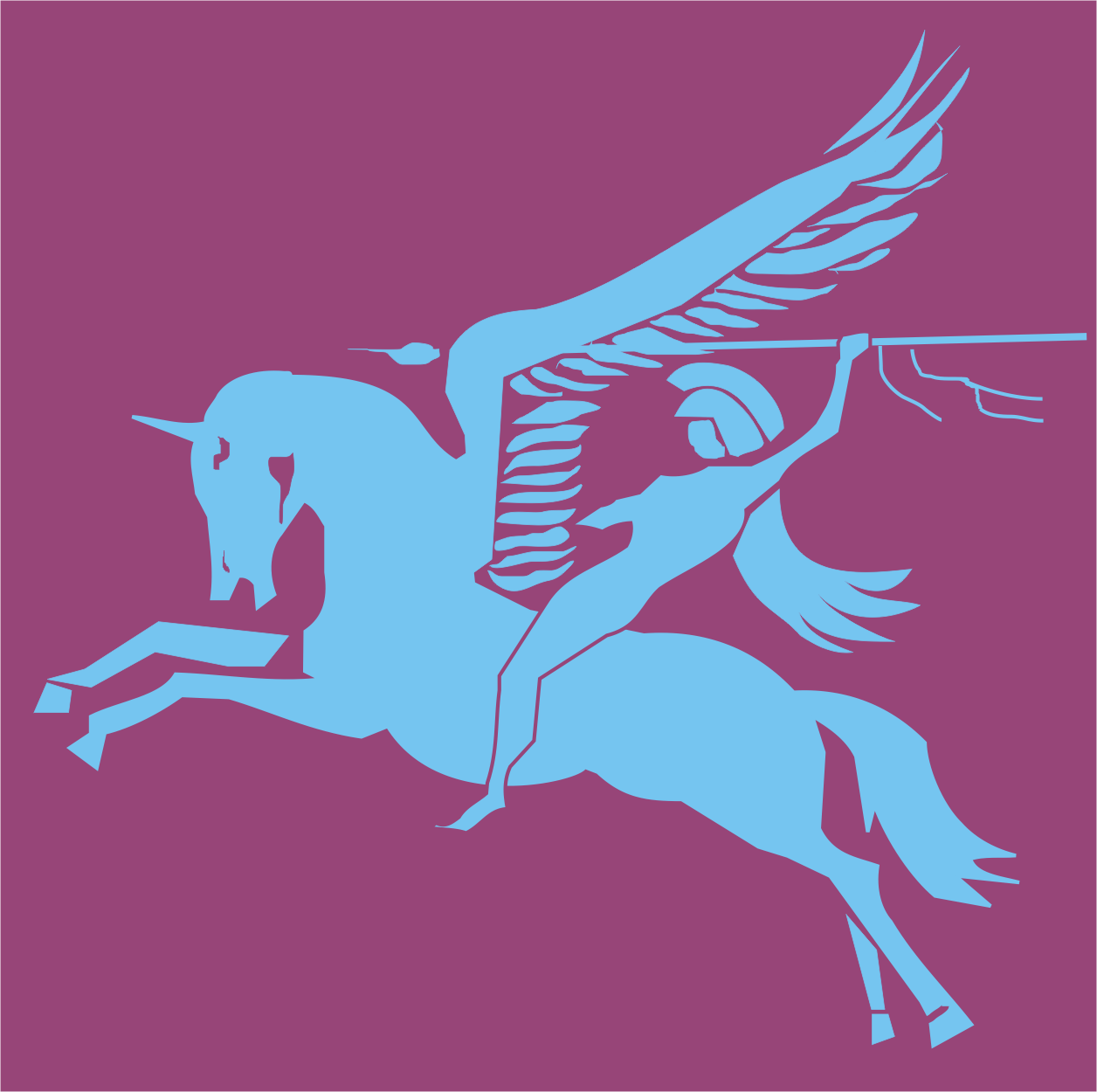
The emblem of British Airborne Forces, Bellerophon riding the flying horse Pegasus.

==== Air-landing battery ====
The battery served with 1st Airborne in the Tunisian Campaign, but its participation in the Allied invasion of Sicily (Operation Husky) was cancelled at the last minute. A shortage of transport aircraft for the invasion of mainland Italy meant that 1st Airborne Division landed by sea at Taranto (Operation Slapstick); although the landing was unopposed, the battery suffered heavy casualties (the battery commander, Maj James Wilson, one other officer and 22 other ranks (ORs) when the mine-layer it was travelling aboard (HMS Abdiel) struck a mine in Taranto harbour and sank.

1st Airborne Division was withdrawn from Italy in the autumn of 1943 and prepared for operations in North West Europe. The division was not called upon in the invasion of Normandy (Operation Overlord). A number of airborne operations were planned and cancelled before the attempt to 'bounce' the bridges up to and across the lower Rhine (Operation Market Garden) was launched. Just beforehand, 2 (Oban) A/L A/T Bty was issued with some of the newer 17-pounder A/T guns: one 6-pdr Troop was converted and three additional 17-pdr Troops organised. The new gun could be transported in the large Hamilcar glider. During the operation, that battery flew in eight Hamilcars and 24 Horsa gliders from RAF Tarrant Rushton and participated in the Battle of Arnhem. After the operation's failure, one officer and 58 ORs were evacuated across the river out of 158 who had gone in. The battery commander, Maj A.F. Haynes was among those taken prisoner.

The reduced 1st Airborne Division did not see action again, but it was sent to liberate Norway after VE Day (Operation Doomsday). By then, the battery had been combined with the other A/L batteries into a new 1st Airlanding A/T Rgt. It was disbanded in November 1945 after returning from Norway.

=== 61st (West Highland) A/T Regiment ===
61st (West Highland) Anti-Tank Rgt mobilised at Rothesay in 9th (Highland) Infantry Division, the 2nd Line duplicate of 51st (H) Division. It remained training in Scottish Command until 7 August 1940 when 9th (H) Division was redesignated as 51st (H) Division to replace the original formation lost at St Valery. 244 A/T Battery left the regiment to join a new 84th A/T Rgt on 22 September and was replaced by 296 A/T Bty from 55th (Suffolk Yeomanry) A/T Rgt on 15 December 1941. The regiment was authorised to adopt the 'West Highland' subtitle on 17 February 1942. 296 A/T Battery left on 10 May 1942 and later joined 107th A/T Rgt; it was replaced by a newly-formed 193 A/T Bty. After completing training in Scotland, the division sailed for Egypt on 16 June 1942, landing on 12 August.

==== North Africa ====
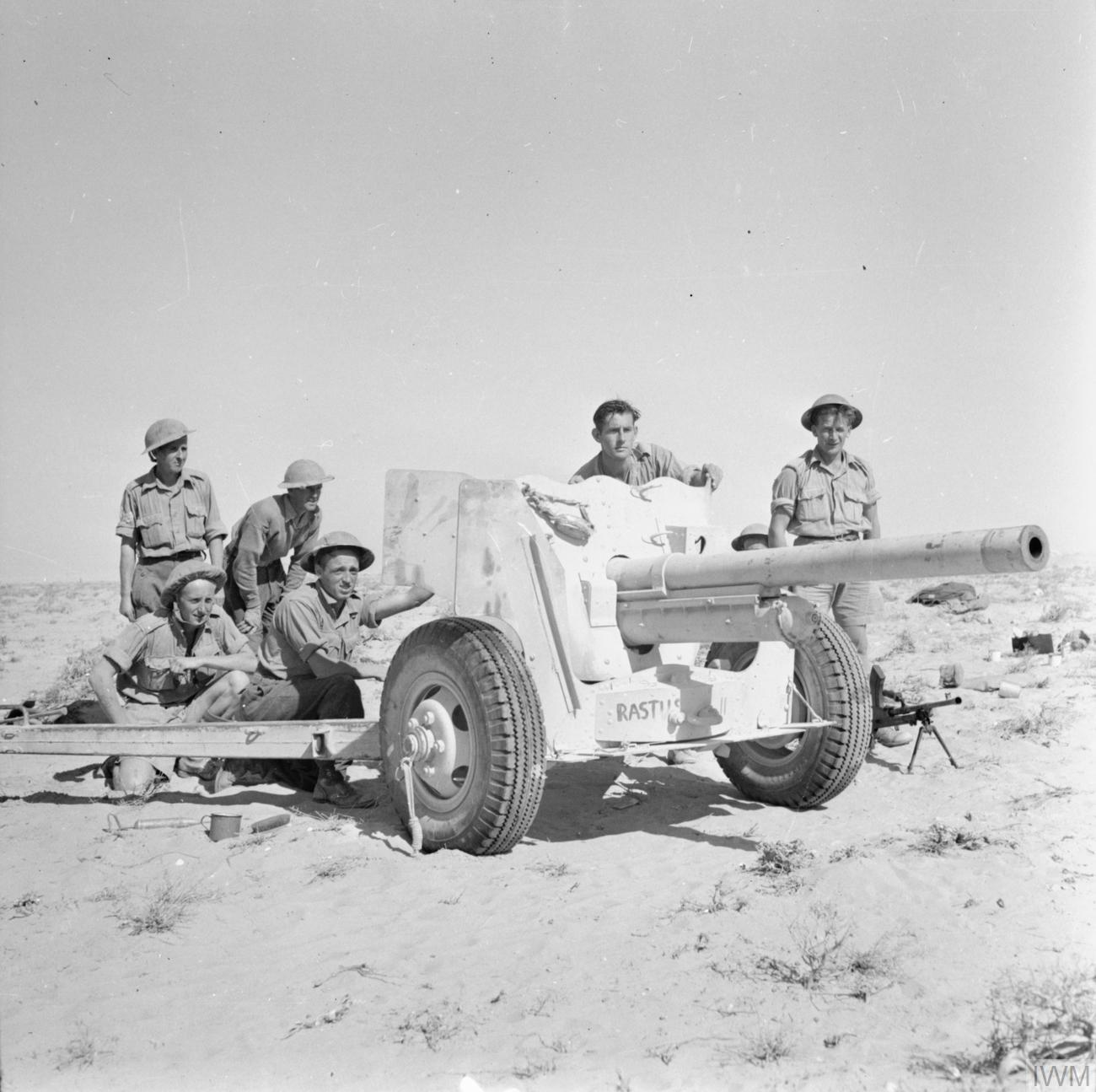
6-pounder A/T gun and crew in the Western Desert, 1942.

The division's first action was the Second Battle of El Alamein, for which the regiment was equipped with 16 x 2-pdrs and 48 of the new Ordnance QF 6-pounder gun. It moved up during the preceding nights, occupying gun positions and dumping ammunition, and remaining concealed during daylight. The bombardment began at 21.40 on 23 October and the advance began 20 minutes later. 51st (H) Division ran into several centres of resistance and only on the extreme left did it reach its final objective; however, the 'break-in' phase of the battle had started well. Over following days 51st (H) Division made progress towards its own objective as the 'dog-fight' phase continued. The 'break-out' phase began on the night of 1/2 November with Operation Supercharge, preceded by another powerful barrage. In the early hours of 4 November 51st (H) Division broke through to the Rahman Track, and the Axis forces began to retreat.

51st (H) Division then took part in the pursuit to El Agheila and Tripoli in January 1943. By 25 February it was past Medenine in Tunisia and facing the Mareth Line. The Axis force made a spoiling attack on 6 March (the Battle of Medenine) but there was plenty of warning. 51st (H) Division was positioned along the Wadi Zassar, a natural anti-tank ditch, and the A/T guns had been positioned to 'kill tanks' rather than protect the infantry from them. The Axis advance was easily repulsed.

The Battle of the Mareth Line began on the night of 16/17 March when 51st (H) Division took the outpost line against negligible opposition. The main attack followed on 20/21 March with another massive night barrage, but little progress was made over the Wadi Zigzaou for the first two days and the line held until it was outflanked by other forces in the south. The Axis defence collapsed on 28 March and the following day 51st (H) Division was on its way to Gabès.

The next Axis defence line was along Wadi Akarit. The barrage for 51st (H) Division's assault began at 04.15 on 6 April, and the division's attack, in the words of the Official History, 'went like clockwork'. 61st (WH) Anti-Tank Rgt went into action with its 6-pdrs towed by tanks while the gun crews rode on the back of the tanks with their ammunition. The tanks then formed a protective screen while the A/T gunners dug in under shellfire. For the first time the regiment encountered Tiger tanks, but these remained out of range of the 6-pdrs using their longer range guns to shell the Highlanders. Axis troops then began counter-attacks and the Highlanders had to fight hard to hold their gains. Some A/T guns got through to support 7th Battalion Argyll and Sutherland Highlanders (A&SH), but not to 7th Bn Black Watch, who were isolated 1,500 yards (1,400 m) away. However, the positions were held. The pursuit was resumed the following day, through Sfax. From 22 April, the division was in action in the hills around Enfidaville, until the end of the campaign on 15 May.

==== Sicily ====
51st (H) Division then went into training for the Allied landings in Sicily (Operation Husky). Together with its 6-pdrs the regiment was issued with a few of the new 17-pounder A/T guns on the stop-gap Pheasant carriage (adapted from the 25-pounder field gun). 51st (H) Division sailed in the invasion convoy from Sfax on 8 July and the assault brigade (154 Bde) landed near Pachino at 03.00 on 10 July. There was little opposition and 241 A/T Bty's guns were got ashore and deployed at pre-arranged sites in the morning. The larger Landing Ships, Tank, arrived about 12.00 and the rest of the regiment went ashore that night. 242 A/T Battery was assigned to 153 Bde and 243 Bty to 152 Bde, while 193 A/T Bty remained with RHQ as divisional reserve. The division then moved forward to Vizzini and Francofonte, where it met its first opposition on 13 July. 243 A/T Bty fired the first rounds of the campaign at a pillbox with great effect, and thereafter the divisional policy was to have A/T guns well up with the infantry as close assault guns for use against pillboxes and machine gun posts in houses.

The division continued with scarcely a pause towards the Dittaino river, where it sent a composite force of infantry and armour ('Arrow Force') accompanied by 243 AT Bty to cross the Dittaino and attempt to capture Paternò. It achieved a bridgehead on 17 July, hoever, further advance was checked, so on the night of 20/21 July the division made an attack against the main enemy defences at Gerbini Airfield. 7th A&SH made the attack supported by A Trp and half of B Trp (Pheasants) and some tanks. Although the attack succeeded, fierce counter-attacks by the Hermann Goring Division drove the Highlanders out the following morning, after which 51st (H) Division was put onto the defensive. Further counter-attacks and heavy shelling on 23/24 July led to more casualties. Because of casualties in men and guns, 193 A/T Bty made use of three captured German 75 mm A/T guns and H Trp was immobilised to keep the others up to strength.

The division was relieved on 30 July and redeployed for operations against Adrano (the battles round Etna). The A/T guns were assembled at Sferro under fire, so that they could be quickly deployed as soon as the infantry were on their objectives. 51st (H) Division took its new bridgeheads over the Dittaino on the night of 31 July/1 August and the A/T guns were in action by daylight. Enemy armour put in a counter-attack at 14.00 and a few tanks got close enough to be destroyed by the A/T guns. Paternò fell on 4 August, Biancavilla on 6 August, and the division began a 50 miles (80 km) 'sidestep' north of Zafferana on 12 August. By now the Axis forces were evacuating Sicily, which was completed on 17 August. During the Sicily campaign, the regiment lost 1 officer and 5 ORs killed, 1 officer and 40 ORs wounded, and 2 ORs missing.

51st (H) Division did not take part in the subsequent Italian Campaign, having been earmarked for Operation Overlord.

==== Normandy ====
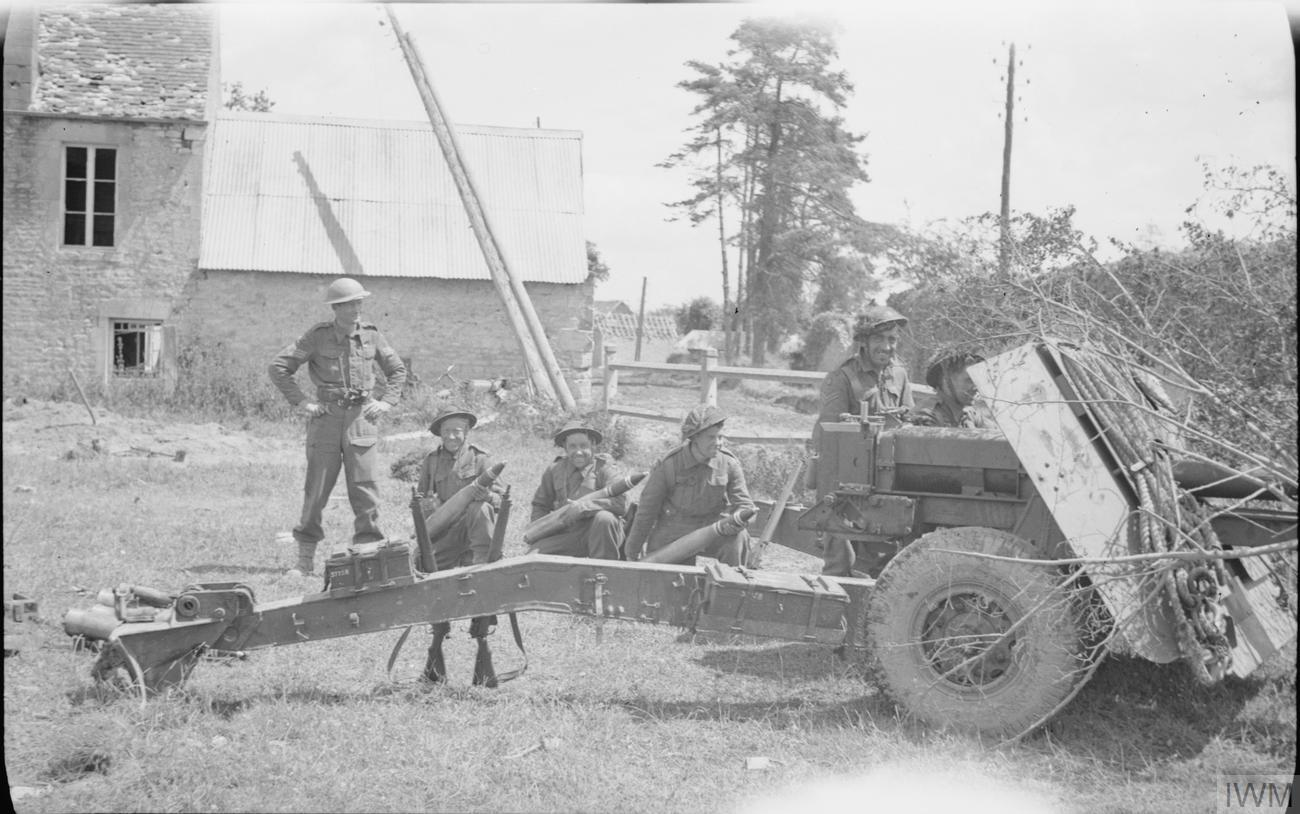
17-pounder A/T gun and crew in Normandy 1944.

51st (Highland) Division was in the first follow-up wave of formations in Overlord. On 2 June 1944, it embarked at East India Docks, London, bound for Normandy and began landing on 7 June (D + 1). The first troops ashore on D + 1 included 242 A/T Bty with 153 Bde Gp and the 17-pdr Trp of 193 A/T Bty with Divisional troops. The division then got bogged down for several weeks in operations round 'The Triangle' north-east of Caen. It then supported 3rd Division's attack on the flank of Operation Goodwood on 18 July.

On 8 August, 51st (H) Division spearheaded II Canadian Corps' attack towards Falaise (Operation Totalize). The attack began before dawn and by first light the break-in was going well, with a number of villages taken. 4th Canadian and 1st Polish Armoured Divisions then passed through to continue the advance. The Canadians renewed the advance to Falaise on 14 August in Operation Tractable, with 51st (H) Division attacking towards the Laison Valley on the left flank. By 21 August, the Falaise Pocket had been closed and the division was advancing eastwards towards Lisieux. It was then sent across the Seine to liberate St Valery, site of the original division's surrender in 1940.

51st (H) Division then moved in for the assault on Le Havre (Operation Astonia). This was a major operation, with heavy air and artillery bombardment and armoured support, which cowed the opposition. It was followed by a similar assault to take Boulogne (Operation Wellhit), and operations to mask Dunkirk.

==== Low Countries ====
The division next made a long move to the Antwerp area at the end of September, then spent three weeks in the line at Sint-Oedenrode. 61st (WH) Anti-Tank Rgt was deployed to cover the chain of bridges captured during Operation Market Garden, engaging occasional targets such as occupied houses or with long-range harassing fire. On 13 October, 193 Bty helped drive off a 'small but well organised' German attack with their A/T guns and Bren guns, while 241 Bty contributed fire from 2-inch mortars. The regiment also practised assault river crossings, using stormboats to ferry Jeep-towed 6-pdrs and improvised pontoons with outboard motors to carry 17-pdrs and Quad tractors.

On 23 October, the regiment took part in Operation Colin, a divisional attack on Schijndel. Schijndel was taken relatively easily and the division pressed on to take Vught on 25 October.

On 4 November, the division began an operation against 'The Island' west of 's-Hertogenbosch with a crossing of the Afwaterings Canal. Deception shoots were carried out by 193 Bty on the right flank and by 243 Bty on the left flank, including giving covering fire from 12 Bren guns for the infantry crossing.

On 14 November, the division carried out an assault crossing of the Willems Canal near Weert (Operation Ascot), then moved on to the Zig Canal and crossed that on 17 November with much less preparation. Once the canal had been bridged, 61st (WH) A/T Rgt's guns were deployed to defend the bridgehead, helped through the bad conditions by being towed by Kangaroo armoured personnel carriers.

51st (H) Division was then tasked with holding the wet low-lying country between Nijmegen and Arnhem that had been captured during Operation Market Garden, some of which subsequently had to be evacuated (Operation Noah) when the Germans broke the dykes and flooded the area. At the beginning of December, the division was pulled out of the line for rest.

In December, the division was suddenly moved south as part of the response to the German breakthrough in the Ardennes (the Battle of the Bulge), and then in January 51st (H) Division fought its way into the flank of the 'Bulge' in winter conditions.

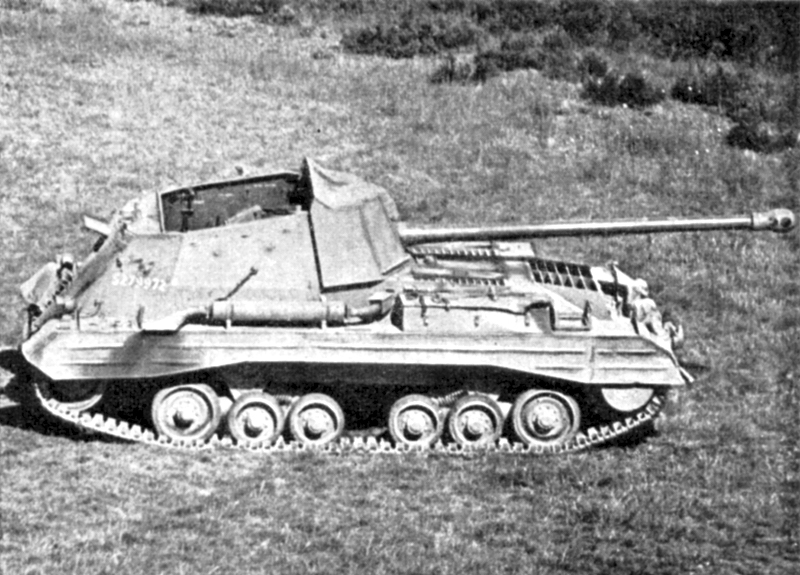
Archer SP 17-pdr.

In the winter of 1944–45, the A/T batteries of infantry divisions were restructured to have one Troop each of towed 6-pdrs, towed 17-pdrs and Archer self-propelled (SP) 17-pdrs on Valentine tank chassis.

==== Rhineland ====
51st (H) Division was next engaged in the fighting in the Reichswald (Operation Veritable). It began at 05.00 on 8 February with a huge artillery preparation, after which the Highlanders attacked and were on their objectives by 23.00 that night. 61st (WH) A/T Rgt's batteries were as usual attached to the infantry brigades (and 193 Bde with RHQ), but the guns were not actually needed. On 10 February, the SP Trp of 242 Bty came into action against enemy machine gun posts and houses, though several Archers of 242 and 243 Btys were bogged or damaged by enemy A/T fire. The slow advance continued through Gennep on 11 February, and the gunners suffered from enemy shellfire. One of the regiment's officers reconnoitring in a Valentine observation post (OP) tank on 12 February attacked and drove off an enemy party in the forest. On 13 February, the SP guns destroyed a tank and a church steeple at Hekkens used as an enemy OP, while other gunners drove off local attacks by German paratroopers with small arms fire. On 16 February 243 Bty's SP and towed 17-pdrs supported a night attack by 152 Bde on Asperden. The final phase of the operation for 51st (H) Division began on 18 February against Goch, which was successfully taken after stiff fighting.

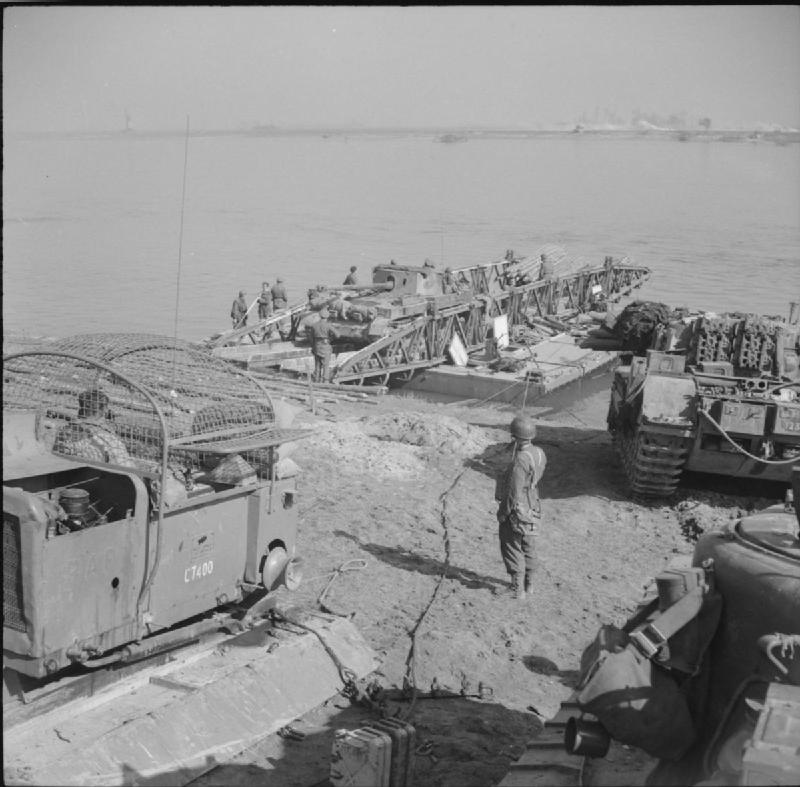
An Archer 17-pdr SP gun of 61st (WH) A/T Rgt being rafted across the Rhine

The division took a leading part in the Rhine crossing (Operation Plunder). The division then continued through Isselburg and Anholt.

The division reached the Dortmund–Ems Canal on 8 April. After a pause at the canal, it advanced rapidly towards Bremen against delaying actions. It reached Delmenhorst on 20 April and closed in on the centre of Bremen. The German surrender at Lüneburg Heath ended the fighting on 5 May.

61st (WH) A/T Rgt was placed in suspended animation on 1 April 1946.

== Postwar ==
When the TA was reconstituted on 1 January 1947, 61st (WH) A/T Rgt was formally disbanded and the former 51st (WH) A/T Rgt was reformed as 254 (West Highland) Anti-Tank Rgt with HQ at Dumbarton, forming part of 51st/52nd (Lowland) Division. In 1950 the regiment re-roled as 254 (West Highland) Light Anti-Aircraft Regiment. In 1954, it absorbed 417 (Dumbartonshire) (Mixed) Heavy Anti-Aircraft Rgt (originally the Clyde RGA, to which the 1st Argyll & Bute Artillery Volunteers had contributed personnel). The combined regiment reverted to being 254 (West Highland) A/T Rgt, with one battery from the 417th.

Finally, on 10 March 1955, the regiment was amalgamated into the Greenock-based 277th (Highland) Field Rgt and the Argyll & Bute lineage ended.

== Uniforms and insignia ==
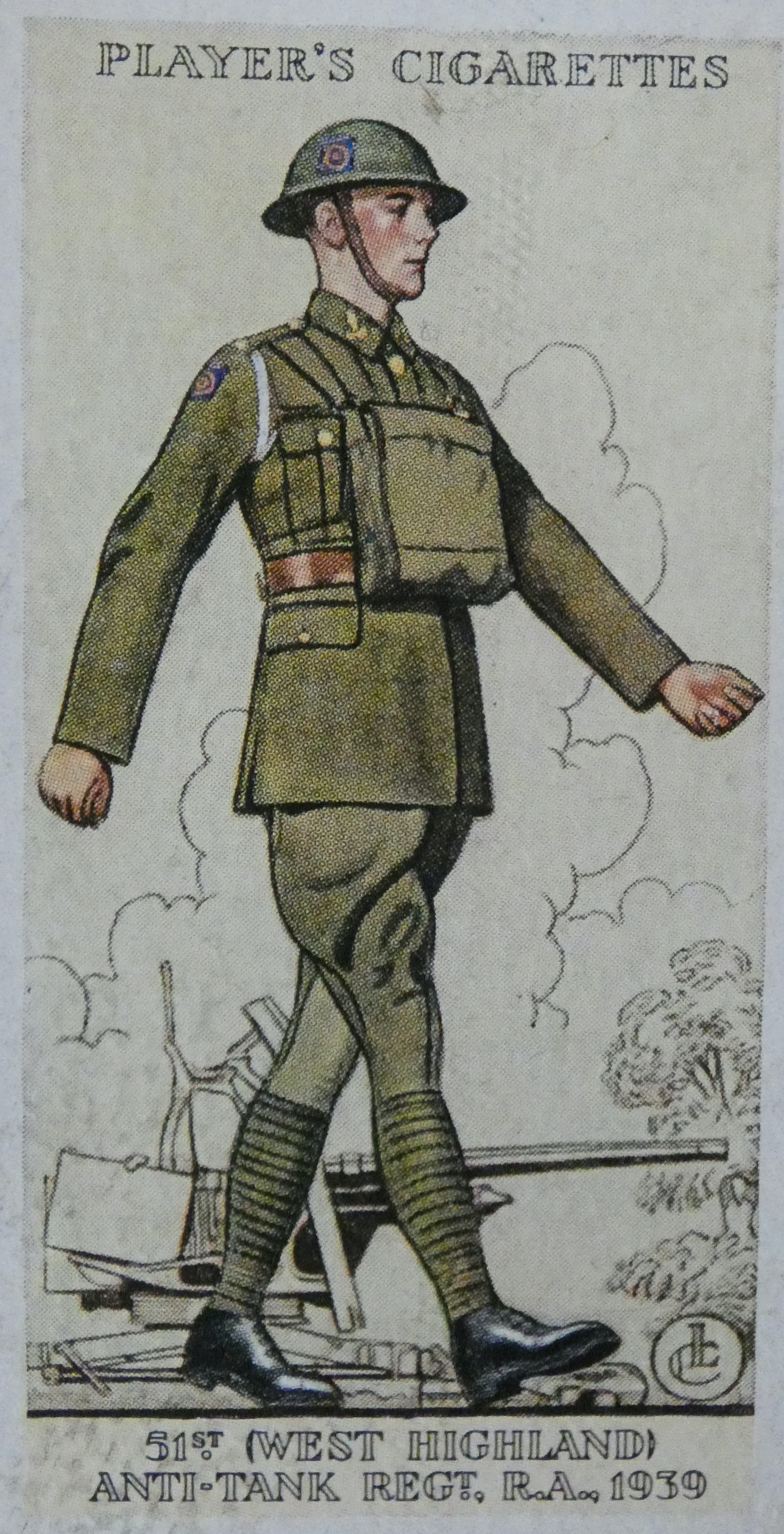
Uniform of the 51st (West Highland) Anti-Tank Regiment 1939, depicted on a contemporary cigarette card.

The original uniforms varied greatly. Colonel F. Campbell (commanding 1884–1903) wrote:'The corps had their separate uniforms, which were tunics or Garibaldi shirts, caps with red, yellow, or white bands; belts brown, black, or white. The officers' dress was even more varied. They joined simply to encourage the movement, and wore much what they chose, utilising any old uniform that they might have worn some time or other, whether cavalry, infantry, or other. Swords of all patterns, perhaps presentations to their forefathers before and after Waterloo'.

In 1860, the 3rd Corps had blue uniforms with scarlet facings, white pouch belts, black waistbelts, and busbies. The 4th Corps wore a jumper and trousers of blue flannel, and a broad Kilmarnock bonnet, such as was usually worn by Tarbert fishermen, of whom it was mainly composed.

On the creation of the TF in 1908, IV Highland (Mtn) Bde adopted the usual brass shoulder titles consisting of 'T' over 'RGA' over the territorial designation, but in this case the three batteries adopted individual titles: T/RGA/ARGYLL, T/RGA/ROSS&CROMARTY and T/RGA/BUTE.

While serving in Macedonia in 1916, IV Mtn Bde was issued with Balmoral bonnets for officers and Kilmarnock bonnets for ORs. Tartan flashes were worn behind the RA gun badge, each battery having a different tartan:

- HQ Bty: Royal Stewart
- Argyll Bty: Campbell
- Ross Bty: Hunting Stewart
- Bute Bty: Mackenzie

== Commanding Officers ==
The following served as Commanding Officer (CO) of the units:

- Major-General J. Campbell, CB, holder of the Waterloo Medal, appointed Major 10 October 1861, Lieutenant-Colonel 23 July 1863
- John Campbell Marquis of Lorne (later 9th Duke of Argyll), KT, GCMG, appointed Lt-Col Commandant 13 July 1866.
- Col Frederick Campbell, late Lieutenant RA, CB, VD, appointed 21 March 1884.
- Col John W Stewart, VD, appointed 1 August 1903.
- Colin G. P. Campbell, late 2nd Lieutenant Scots Guards, appointed 17 February 1906

== Honorary Colonels ==
The following served as Honorary Colonel of the unit:

- John Campbell, 9th Duke of Argyll, former CO, appointed 18 July 1900.
- C. McL. Robertson, DSO, TD, appointed 3 January 1923.
- T. McElvie, CMG, TD, appointed 3 January 1929
- Maj Sir Colin W. McCrae, CVO, CBE, appointed 3 January 1935

== Memorial ==
There is a memorial in Stornoway to the men of 1st Ross-Shire Mountain Bty who died in Egypt, at Gallipoli and in the Balkans during the First World War, and during the Second World War. The monument is of stone in the form of a cairn surmounted by a thistle, standing in front of the Drill Hall and TA Centre at the crossroads of Church and Lewis Streets.
