= Arkforce =

Arkforce may refer to:

- Arkforce (1940), of the British Expeditionary Force during the Battle of France in 1940
- Arkforce (Force 140), created from 23rd Armoured Brigade in 1944 for security duties in Greece
