= Norman Force =

Formation of units in the British Expeditionary Force

In the Battle of France in June 1940, Norman Force, or Normanforce, was a formation of units of the British Expeditionary Force, following the Dunkirk evacuation (Operation Dynamo).

On 12 June 1940, Lieutenant-General Sir Alan Brooke returned to France and assumed command of all British troops in the country the next day. He placed the British units fighting with the French Tenth Army under the command of Lieutenant-General J. H. Marshall-Cornwall. This improvised formation was known as Norman Force and on 15 June comprised the 3rd Armoured Brigade of the 1st Armoured Division, the 157th (Highland Light Infantry) Brigade, 71st Field Regiment R.A. and the Troop Carrying Company of the 52nd (Lowland) Infantry Division.

Next day, Brooke was able to prevent the rest of the 52nd (Lowland) Division being sent to join the 157th Infantry Brigade and during the night he was informed that he was no longer under French command and must prepare to withdraw the British forces from France. Marshall-Cornwall was ordered to withdraw towards Cherbourg, while continuing to co-operate with the French. The rest of the 52nd (Lowland) Division was ordered back to a defence line near Cherbourg to cover the evacuation on 15 June. The RAF Advanced Air Striking Force (AASF) was also directed to send its last bomber squadrons back to Britain and use the fighter squadrons to cover the evacuations. The German advance over the Seine had paused while bridges were built but the advance began again during the day, with the 157th Infantry Brigade engaged east of Conches-en-Ouche with the Tenth Army. The army was ordered to retreat to a line from Verneuil to Argentan and the Dives river, where the British took over an 8 mi (13 km)-front either side of the Mortagne-au-Perche–Verneuil-sur-Avre road. German forces followed up quickly and on 16 June, General Robert Altmayer (commander of the Tenth Army) ordered the army to retreat into the Brittany peninsula. Following Operation Cycle (10 to 13 June), Operation Aerial, the final Allied evacuation, began on 15 June.
