= Arkforce (1940) =

British Army unit

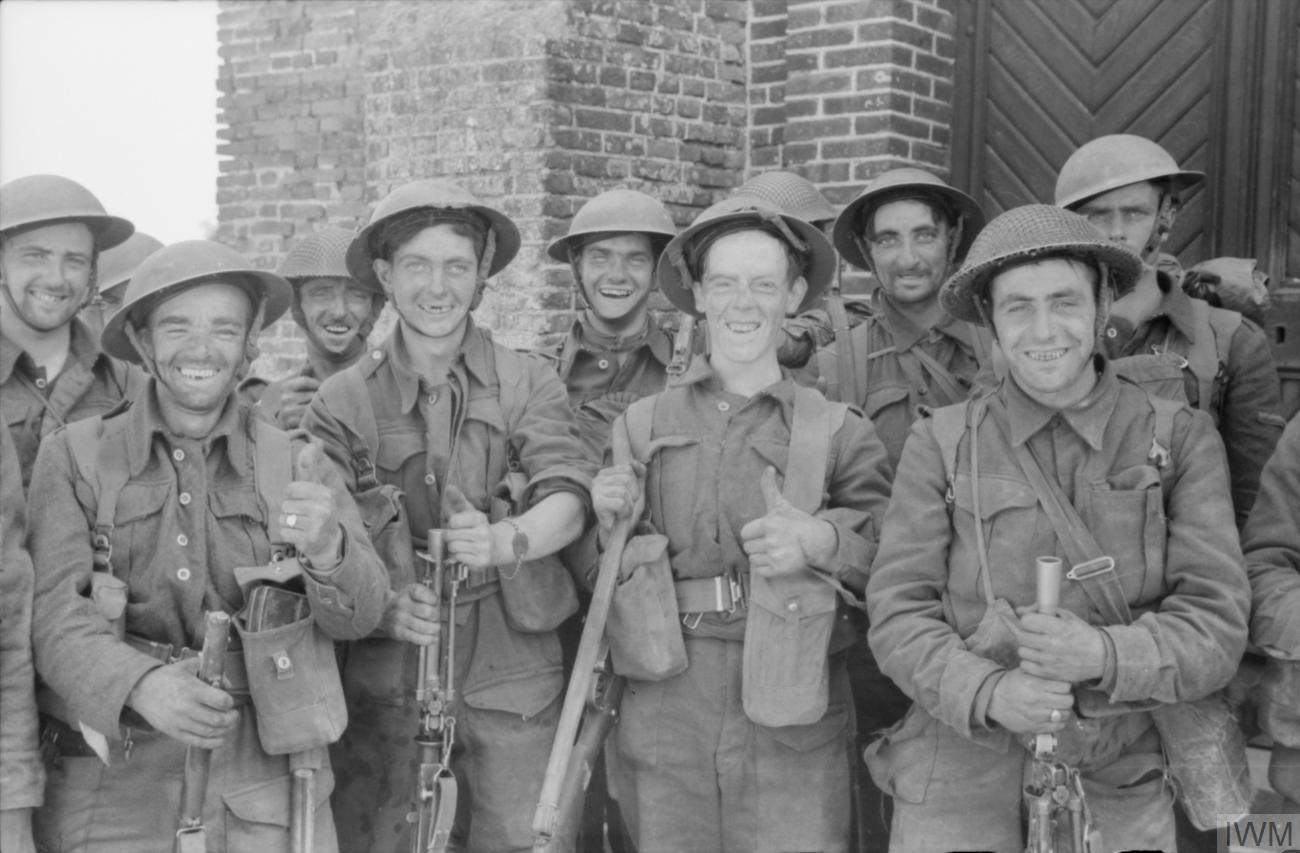
Men of the 7th Battalion, Argyll and Sutherland Highlanders (7 June 1940)

Arkforce was an ad hoc formation of the British Expeditionary Force during the Battle of France in 1940.

== Background ==
Bresle river valley

At the start of the Battle of France, the 51st (Highland) Infantry Division was on detachment from the rest of the BEF, having been reinforced, to man part of the Maginot Line under French command. After being withdrawn and sent west, the division was attached to IX Corps of the French Tenth Army in Normandy along the lower reaches of the river Somme. Command of the corps was given to Major-General Victor Fortune of the Highland Division, who was under the command of General Robert Altmayer the Tenth Army commander. After almost continuous fighting against a German bridgehead on the south bank at Abbeville, the division was ordered to retreat on 7 June, to a 13 mi (21 km) defensive line along the river Bresle. When the second German offensive Fall Rot (Case Red) reached the area the next day, the 5th Panzer Division outflanked the Bresle position at Rouen, leaving the Highlanders and the French 31st Division cut off from their line of retreat across the River Seine. Fortune decided to ignore orders from Altmayer and the War Office to retire towards the Seine (through an area now occupied by several German divisions) and to head for the port of Le Havre, taking the rest of IX Corps with him.

== Formation and role ==
Arques river and vicinity

The units grouped into Arkforce were near Arques-la-Bataille and its name was derived from village. Arkforce was to form a defensive line about 19 mi (30 km) to the east of Le Havre, on the Fécamp–Bolbec line, to allow the 51st Highland Division and the rest of IX Corps to retreat. It was also charged with providing the reconnaissance for a line of defence closer to Le Havre, to aid the evacuation.

== Operations ==
Due to congested roads, units were late arriving and elements of the 7th Panzer Division were already driving between Arkforce and the rest of IX Corps. Arkforce moved on the night of 9/10 June towards Fécamp, where most had passed through before the 7th Panzer Division arrived. A Brigade managed to force its way out but lost the wireless truck intended to keep contact with the 51st (Highland) Division. The possibility of holding a line from Fécamp to Lillebonne was discounted and Stanley-Clarke ordered Arkforce on to Le Havre. The port was severely bombed by the Luftwaffe on 7 June; a Royal Navy demolition party had been in Le Havre since late May and two days later, the Admiralty sent orders for an evacuation. Admiral William James, the Commander-in-Chief, Portsmouth sent a flotilla leader, HMS Codrington across the channel, accompanied by six British and two Canadian destroyers, smaller craft and many Dutch coasters (known as schuyts).

A hasty plan was made to block Dieppe harbour and on 10 June, HMS Vega (Captain G. A. Garnon-Williams) escorted three blockships to the port. Two ships were sunk in the approach channel but the third ship hit a mine just outside, which prevented it being sunk at the entrance to the inner harbour. (James had signalled that many IX Corps troops would probably be trapped against the sea near St. Valery, where he had assembled flotillas of smaller craft under the local Senior Naval Officer.) Beach parties landed at Le Havre to take control of the evacuation on 10 June and after a postponement, the evacuation began on 11 June, hindered somewhat by the damage to the port caused by Luftwaffe bombing. The troopship SS Bruges, was hit and beached and the electric power to the docks was cut, rendering the cranes on the docks useless; ramps were tried for vehicle loading but it was too slow. On 12 June, RAF fighters began patrolling the port to deter raids. An attempt was made to save the transport and equipment by diverting it over the Seine, via the ferry crossings at Caudebec or to the ships at Quillebeuf at the river mouth. The quartermaster of the 14th Battalion, Royal Fusiliers succeeded in getting his transport away.

== Order of battle ==
Arkforce Data from Joslen (2003) unless indicated.

- 154th Brigade, 51st Highland Division (acting Brigadier D. J. Grant MC)
  - 4th Battalion, The Black Watch
  - 7th Battalion, The Argyll & Sutherland Highlanders
  - 8th Battalion, The Argyll & Sutherland Highlanders
- "A" Brigade, Beauman Division (Brigadier M. A. Green), attached to 51st Highland Division, 9 June 1940
  - 4th Battalion, The Border Regiment
  - 1/5th Battalion, The Sherwood Foresters
  - 4th Battalion, The Buffs (East Kent Regiment)
- Divisional units
  - 1st Battalion, Princess Louise's Kensington Regiment (less two companies)
  - 6th Battalion, The Royal Scots Fusiliers (Pioneers)
  - 17th Field Regiment, Royal Artillery
  - 75th (Highland) Field Regiment, Royal Artillery
  - 204 (Oban) Anti-Tank Battery, Royal Artillery
  - 51st (Midland) Medium Regiment, Royal Artillery (without guns)
  - 236th Field Company, Royal Engineers
  - 237th Field Company, Royal Engineers
  - 239th Field Park Company, Royal Engineers
  - 213th Army Field Company, Royal Engineers
  - 154th Field Ambulance, Royal Army Medical Corps
  - Detachments from 525, 526 and 527 companies Royal Army Service Corps
