= Asperden =

Village in North Rhine-Westphalia, Germany

Coordinates: 51°42′N 6°07′E

Asperden is a village in the municipality of Goch, Kreis Kleve in the German State of North Rhine-Westphalia.

The place name Asperden is a degeneration of Aspen-Rodung, or the harvesting of aspens, a popular tree-species.

It dates from the time when the forests were cut down systematically and open spaces were created where habitation arose.

The village has been part of Stadt Goch since 1969.

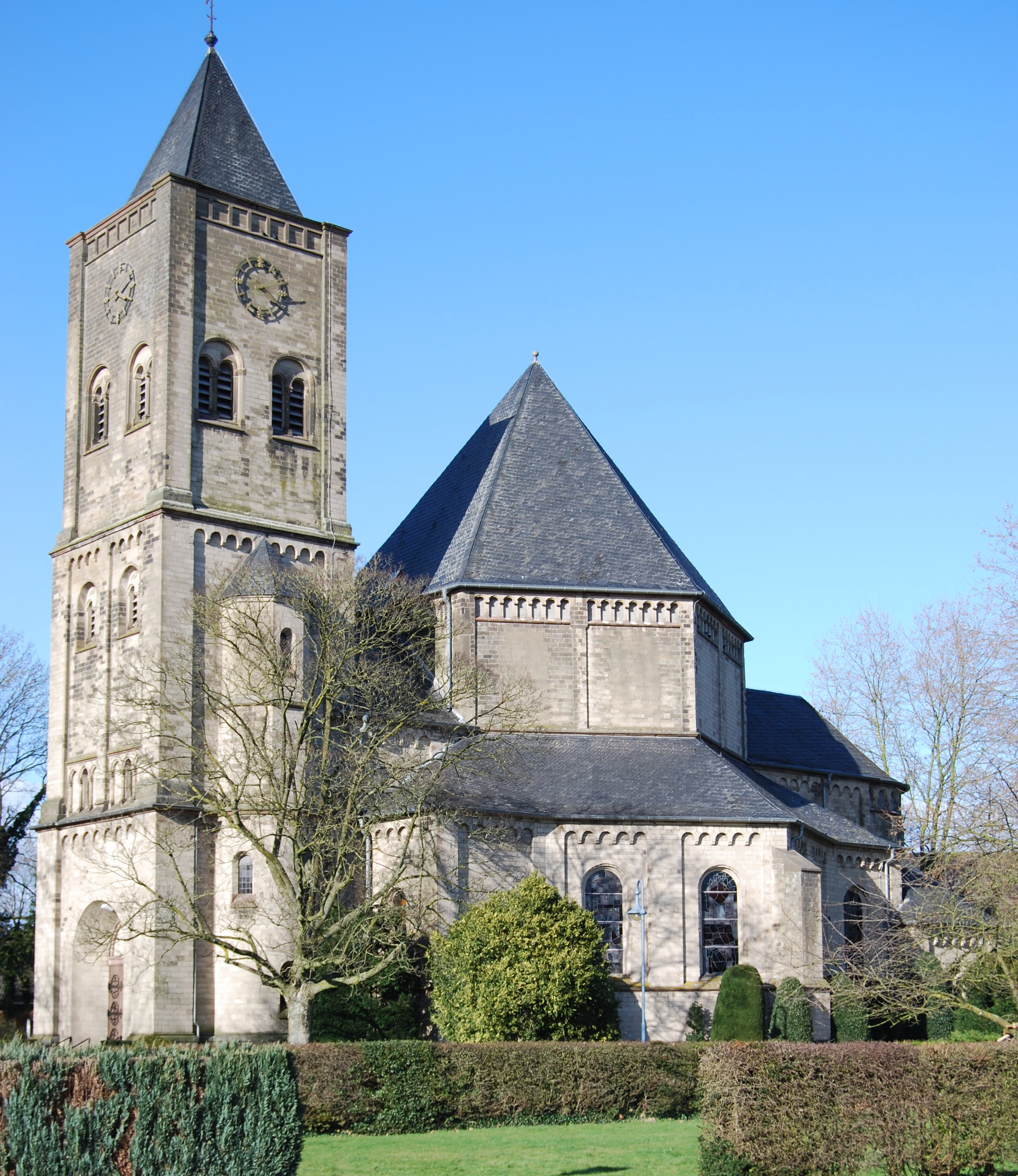
Church St. Vincentius

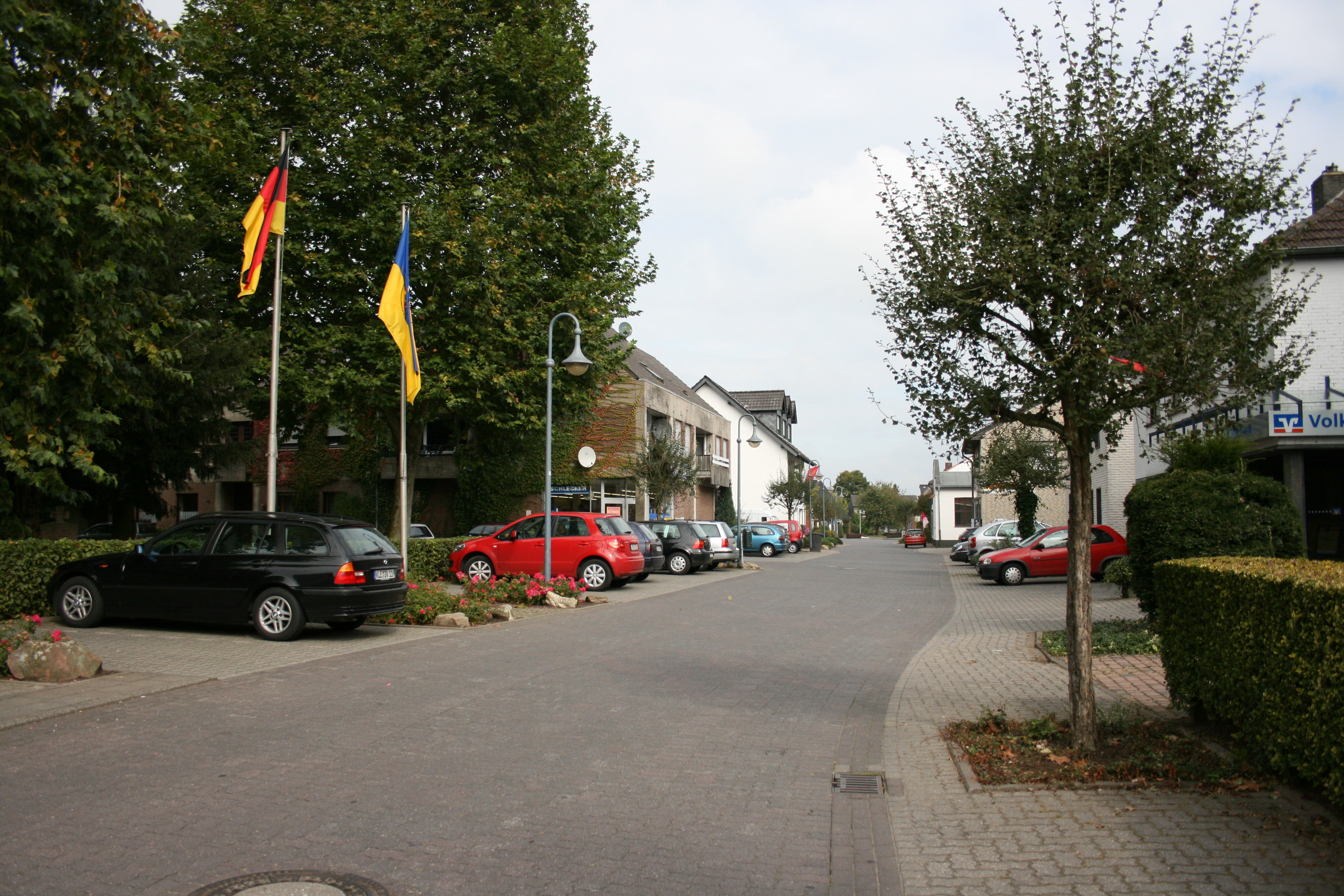
