= SS Bruges (1920) =

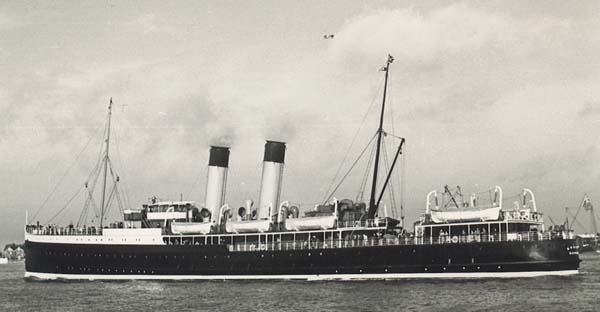

History
- Name: TSS Bruges
- Operator: 1920–1923: Great Eastern Railway; 1923–1940: London and North Eastern Railway
- Port of registry: (United Kingdom)
- Route: Harwich to Antwerp
- Builder: John Brown, Clydebank
- Yard number: 494
- Launched: 20 March 1920
- Fate: Bombed and sunk 11 June 1940

General characteristics
- Tonnage: 2,949 gross register tons (GRT)
- Length: 321.6 feet (98.0 m)
- Beam: 43.1 feet (13.1 m)

TSS Bruges was a passenger vessel built for the Great Eastern Railway in 1920.

== History ==
The ship was built by John Brown of Clydebank for the Great Eastern Railway as one of a contract for two new steamers and launched on 20 March 1920. She was launched by Lady Thornton

She was placed on the Harwich to Antwerp route.

In 1923 she was acquired by the London and North Eastern Railway.

She was requisitioned during the World War II as a troopship. She took part in Operation Cycle (the evacuation of Allied troops from Le Havre) and bombed and damaged on 11 June 1940 at Le Havre by Luftwaffe aircraft. She was beached to prevent her from sinking.
