= James Marshall-Cornwall =

British Army general (1887–1985)

General Sir James Marshall-Cornwall KCB CBE DSO MC FRGS FRSGS
- Born: 27 May 1887; India
- Died: 25 December 1985 (aged 98)
- Military career
- Allegiance: United Kingdom
- Branch: British Army
- Service years: 1907–1943
- Rank: General
- Service number: 1094
- Unit: Royal Artillery
- Commands: Western Command (1941–42); British Troops in Egypt (1941); III Corps (1940)
- Conflicts: First World War; Second World War
- Awards: Knight Commander of the Order of the Bath; Commander of the Order of the British Empire; Distinguished Service Order; Military Cross; Mentioned in Despatches (7); Knight of the Legion of Honour (France); Officer of the Order of the Crown (Belgium); Croix de Guerre (Belgium); Distinguished Service Medal (United States); Commander of the Legion of Merit (United States); Grand Officer of the Order of the Nile (Egypt)

General Sir James Handyside Marshall-Cornwall, KCB, CBE, DSO, MC, FRGS, FRSGS (27 May 1887 – 25 December 1985) was a senior British Army officer and military historian.

== Education ==
Cornwall went to Rugby School and the Royal Military Academy, Woolwich. Commissioned into the Royal Field Artillery in 1907, during his first spell of annual leave he travelled to Germany to study German. He later passed the Civil Service Commission examination as a first-class German interpreter, the first of the eleven interpreterships he was to gain. He passed as a first-class interpreter in French, Norwegian, Swedish, Hollander Dutch, and Italian.

== Military career ==
On the outbreak of the First World War, Cornwall joined the Intelligence Corps at Le Havre. In 1915 he was appointed to the rank of captain at 2nd Corps Headquarters in the Second Army. In 1916 he was promoted to temporary major at the General Headquarters of the British Expeditionary Force (BEF), under General Sir Douglas Haig. In 1918, Cornwall was posted to the War Office as head of the MI3 section of the military intelligence directorate, where he remained until the armistice.

Cornwall was decorated with the Military Cross in 1915, the Distinguished Service Order and the French Legion of Honour in 1917, the Belgian Order of the Crown and Croix de Guerre in 1918, and the United States Distinguished Service Medal in 1919.

In 1919, after attending the first postwar course at the Staff College, Camberley, Cornwall was sent to the peace conference in Paris, where he worked with Reginald Leeper and Harold Nicolson on the new boundaries of Europe. Several jobs in the Middle East in the 1920s gave him the opportunity to study the Turkish and modern Greek languages. In 1927 he was sent to China with the Royal Artillery (Shanghai Defence Force), to protect British life and property in the Shanghai International Settlement. This enabled him to acquire Mandarin and to travel extensively in the Far East with his wife.

From 1928 to 1932 Marshall-Cornwall (as he was now known) held the post of military attaché in Berlin. In 1934, after two years as commander of the 51st Highland Division, Royal Artillery, based at Perth, Scotland, Marshall-Cornwall was promoted the rank of major-general on 14 September 1934. He was then placed on half-pay on 15 September and spent the next four years travelling in Europe, India, and the United States, then two years in Cairo as head of the British military mission to Egypt. Here he qualified as an interpreter in colloquial Arabic.

In 1938, Marshall-Cornwall was promoted to lieutenant-general, in charge of the air defences of Great Britain. In May 1940 he went to France to help evacuate British troops from Cherbourg, commanding an ad hoc formation dubbed Norman Force, boarding the last ship to leave the port. He took over command of III Corps in England in June 1940 holding the post until November. In April 1941 he became General Officer Commanding the British Troops in Egypt. Later that year he was sent by Winston Churchill to Turkey in an attempt to persuade the Turks to enter the war on the Allied side, a mission which failed.

Marshall-Cornwall took over Western Command in November 1941, but was dismissed in 1942 for going outside the proper channels to secure the safety of the Liverpool docks. He spent the rest of the war with the Special Operations Executive and MI6, attempting to promote better relations between them. He retired from the army in 1943.

== Post military life ==
Between 1948 and 1951, Marshall-Cornwall was editor-in-chief of the German archives at the Foreign Office captured by the British Army in 1945, and wrote military history. He was president of the Royal Geographical Society (1954–58).

In 1985, one of his last articles was a book review of Colonel Z, a book about the life of Claude Dansey, a man that he knew well. In his review, he only made three minor revisions.

== Personal life ==
Cornwall met Marjorie Coralie Scott Owen, who was driving an ambulance for a Red Cross mission to White Russian refugees, while encamped in the Izmit peninsula. They were married in Wales in April 1921. In 1927 he inherited a small estate in Scotland from his uncle William Marshall, on condition that he should assume the surname of Marshall. As Marshall was one of his forenames, this was achieved by the insertion of a hyphen. The Marshall-Cornwalls had a son and two daughters. Their elder daughter died aged fourteen in 1938 after an operation for appendicitis in Switzerland. Their son was killed in France in 1944. He is buried on the spot where he fell, in an orchard near Cahaignes, Normandy. After the war, the landowner presented the site of the grave to the casualty's father, who in turn, requested that the grave remain undisturbed. His other daughter, Janet, married Michael Willoughby, 12th Baron Middleton on 14 October 1947.

Marshall-Cornwall died, aged 98, on Christmas Day 1985.

== Publications ==
- Geographic Disarmament: A Study of Regional Demilitarisation (1935)
- Marshal Massena (1965)
- Napoleon as Military Commander (1967)
- Grant as Military Commander (1970)
- Foch as Military Commander (1972)
- Haig as Military Commander (1973)
- History of the Geographical Club (1976)
- A Memoir: Wars & Rumours of Wars (1984) (autobiography)

== Bibliography ==
- Mead, Richard (2007). Churchill's Lions: A Biographical Guide to the Key British Generals of World War II. Stroud: Spellmount. ISBN 978-1-86227-431-0.
- Smart, Nick (2005). Biographical Dictionary of British Generals of the Second World War. Barnesley: Pen & Sword. ISBN 1844150496.

Military offices
Preceded by Ronald Adam	GOC III Corps; June–November 1940	Succeeded by Desmond Anderson
Preceded by Sir Richard O'Connor	GOC British Troops in Egypt; April–November 1941	Succeeded by William Holmes
Preceded by Sir Robert Gordon-Finlayson	GOC-in-C Western Command; 1941–1942	Succeeded by Sir Edmond Schreiber
