= Franleu =

- Commune
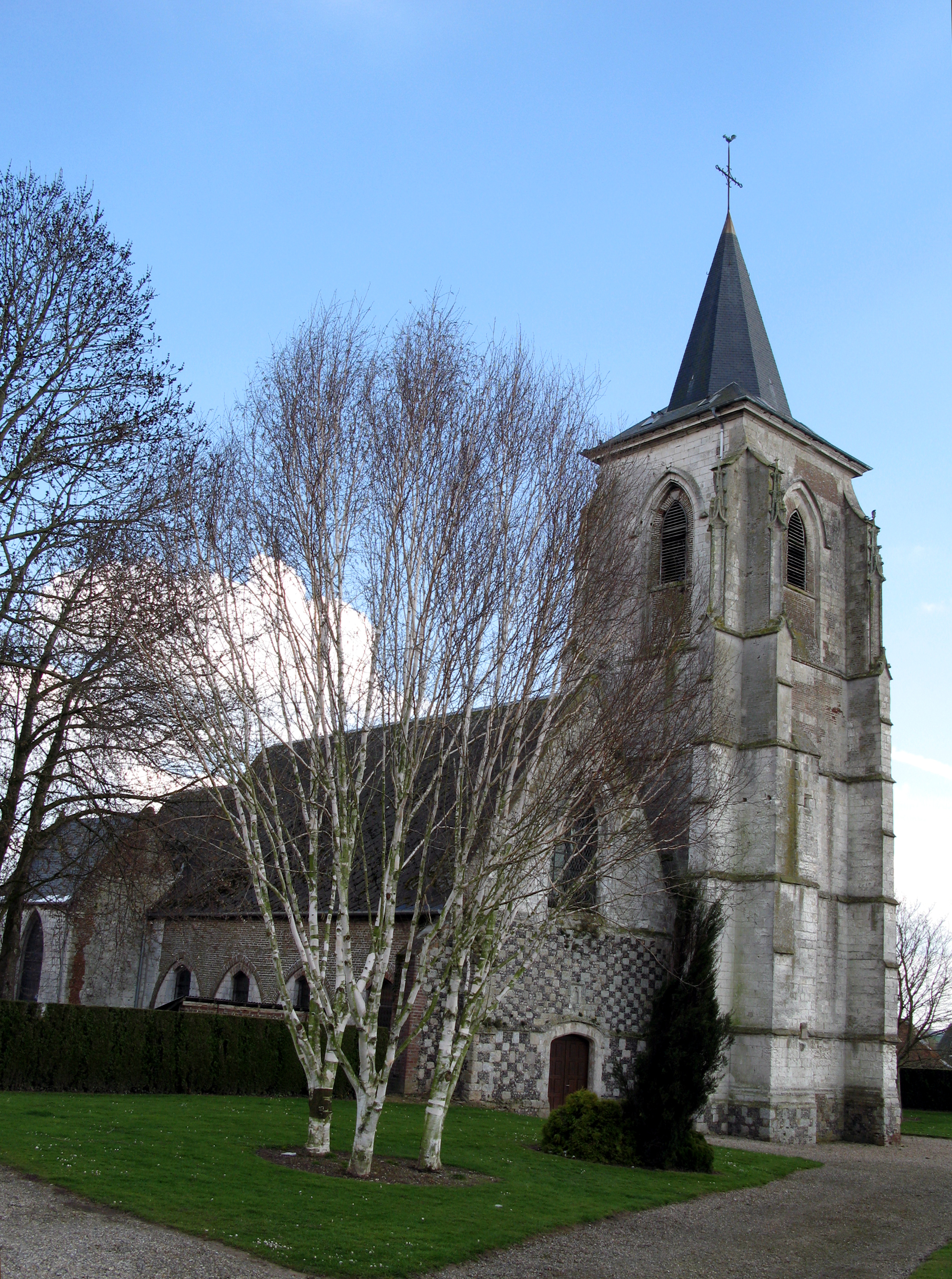
- The church in Franleu
- Location of Franleu
- Location within France Location within Hauts-de-France
- Coordinates: 50°05′56″N 1°38′28″E
- Country: France
- Region: Hauts-de-France
- Department: Somme
- Arrondissement: Abbeville
- Canton: Abbeville-2
- Intercommunality: CA Baie de Somme

Government
  - Mayor (2020–2026): Bertrand Martel
- Area^{1}: 8.43 km^{2} (3.25 sq mi)
- Elevation: 79 m (259 ft)
- Highest elevation: 90 m (300 ft)
- Lowest elevation: 38 m (125 ft)
- Population (2023): 501
  - Density: 59.4/km^{2} (154/sq mi)
- Time zone: UTC+01:00 (CET)
  - Summer (DST): UTC+02:00 (CEST)
- INSEE/Postal code: 80345 /80210
- ^{1} French Land Register data, which excludes lakes, ponds, glaciers > 1 km^{2} (0.386 sq mi or 247 acres) and river estuaries.

Franleu (French pronunciation: [fʁɑ̃lø]) is a commune in the Somme department in Hauts-de-France in northern France.

== Geography ==
Franleu is situated 7 miles (11 km) west of Abbeville on the D80 road.

== Population ==
Historical population
Year	Pop.	±% p.a.
1968	515	—
1975	571	+1.49%
1982	550	−0.53%
1990	514	−0.84%
1999	523	+0.19%
2007	511	−0.29%
2012	519	+0.31%
2017	552	+1.24%
2023	501	−1.60%
Source: INSEE

== See also ==
- Communes of the Somme department
