= HMS Vega (L41) =

Destroyer of the Royal Navy

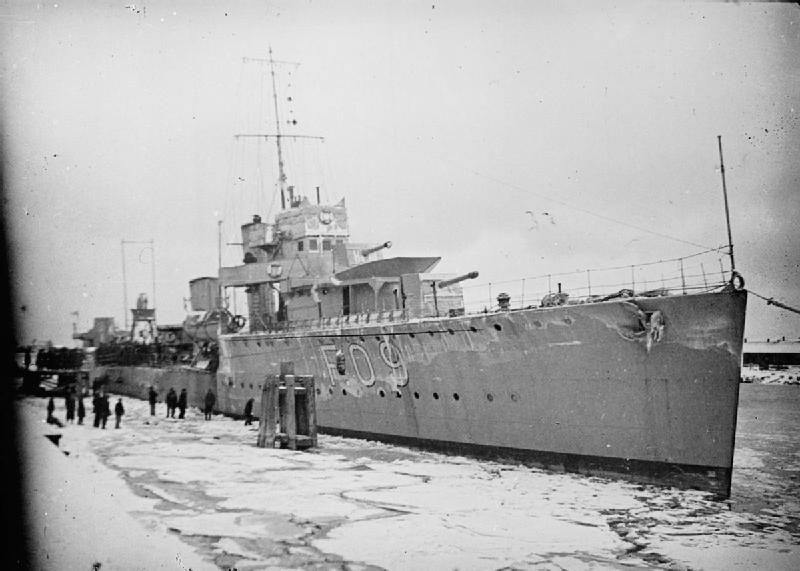
- HMS Vega in a Russian port, 1919

History

United Kingdom
- Name: HMS Vega
- Namesake: Vega, the brightest star in the constellation Lyra
- Ordered: 30 June 1916
- Builder: William Doxford & Sons, Sunderland
- Laid down: 11 December 1916
- Launched: 1 September 1917
- Completed: 12 December 1917
- Commissioned: 14 December 1917
- Decommissioned: 1921
- Identification: Pennant number: F4A (1917); F92 (January 1918); F09 (April 1918); D52 (interwar); L41 (1939)
- Recommissioned: 1939
- Decommissioned: 1945
- Identification: Pennant number:L41
- Motto: Praeclare fulgens ("Shining brightly")
- Honours and awards: Battle honour for North Sea 1940–1945
- Fate: Sold for scrapping 4 March 1947
- Badge: A gold lyre with a silver star in chief on it, all on a blue field

General characteristics
- Class & type: Admiralty V-class destroyer
- Displacement: 1,272–1,339 tons
- Length: 300 ft (91.4 m) o/a, 312 ft (95.1 m) p/p
- Beam: 26 ft 9 in (8.2 m)
- Draught: 9 ft (2.7 m) standard, 11 ft 3 in (3.4 m) deep
- Propulsion: 3 Yarrow type Water-tube boilers; Brown-Curtis steam turbines; 2 shafts, 27,000 shp
- Speed: 34 kt
- Range: 320–370 tons oil, 3,500 nmi at 15 kt, 900 nmi at 32 kt
- Complement: 110
- Armament: 4 × QF 4 in Mk.V (102mm L/45), mount P Mk.I; 2 × QF 2 pdr Mk.II "pom-pom" (40 mm L/39) or; 1 z QF 12 pdr 20 cwt Mk.I (76 mm), mount HA Mk.II; 4 (2x2) tubes for 21 in torpedoes

The second HMS Vega was a V-class destroyer of the British Royal Navy that saw service in World War I and World War II.

== Construction and commissioning ==
Vega was ordered on 30 June 1916 as part of the 9th Order of the 1916–17 Naval Programme. She was laid down on 11 December 1916 by William Doxford & Sons at Sunderland, England, and launched on 1 September 1917. She was completed on 12 December 1917 and commissioned into service on 14 December 1917. Her original pennant number, F4A, was changed to F92 in January 1918 and to F09 in April 1918. It became D52 during the interwar period.

== Service history ==
=== World War I ===
Vega was assigned to the Grand Fleet or Harwich Force and saw service in the last year of World War I, suffering damage while operating with the fleet in 1918.

=== Interwar years ===
Vega was among the ships which accompanied the battlecruisers HMS Hood and HMS Tiger during their visit to Scandinavian ports in June 1920. During the voyage, she and the destroyer HMS Vectis tested the Royal Navy's High Speed Mine Sweep, which the British Admiralty hoped to use in the shallow waters of the Baltic in the event of a war with Bolshevik Russia (soon to become the Soviet Union). In a blow to the Admiralty's plans, both destroyers lost their minesweeping apparatus, demonstrating the High Speed Mine Sweep to be impractical in shallow water.

In 1921, Vega was part of the 6th Destroyer Flotilla, assigned to the Atlantic Fleet. She later was placed in reserve and assigned to the Reserve Fleet.

Under the 1939 Rearmament Programme, Vega was selected for conversion to an antiaircraft escort. In May 1939, she entered Chatham Dockyard to begin conversion.

=== World War II ===
==== 1939–1941 ====
Vega was still undergoing conversion when the United Kingdom entered World War II in September 1939, but in October 1939 she underwent her post-conversion acceptance trials and was selected for service escorting convoys in the North Sea. She reported to the Rosyth Escort Force in Scotland in November 1939 and began convoy duty in December 1939. Her pennant number became L41 when she reentered service in 1939.

In May 1940, Vega was detached from her normal duties for operations in the English Channel related to requirements to evacuate Allied troops from Belgium and France and prevent the use of French ports by German forces, and she assisted in the evacuation of troops from Ostend and Zeebrugge, Belgium. On 26 May 1940, she served as the flagship for Operation Lyster, the sinking of two blockships at Zeebrugge. The following day, she joined the Polish Navy destroyer Błyskawica in a night reconnaissance of the harbor at Dunkirk, France, to determine whether Allied troops could be evacuated there; although two German aircraft attacked them and there were many wrecks in the harbor, they found it navigable, and the Royal Navy decided to send ships there to evacuate troops. On 10 June 1940 she escorted blockships to Dieppe, France, and, after they sank themselves to block the harbor there, supported the evacuation of Allied personnel from Le Havre, France. On 17 June 1940, she deployed to support Operation Aerial, the evacuation of Allied personnel from Saint-Nazaire, France, and other French ports on the Bay of Biscay.

In July 1940, Vega returned to convoy duty in the North Sea. This came to an end on 11 November 1940, when she struck a naval mine off Sunk Head, Harwich, England, and suffered heavy damage. While still under repair in December 1941, she was "adopted" by the civil community of Godalming, Surrey, in a Warship Week fundraising campaign.

==== 1942–1945 ====
Vega's repairs were not completed until 14 November 1942. She emerged from them with Type 285 fire-control radar installed for her main guns, as well as a Type 286 air search radar to warn of the approach of aircraft. She returned to her convoy escort duties in the North Sea for the rest of World War II, and later had a Type 271 radar installed for the detection of submarines and motor torpedo boats. In 1943 she had radio telephone equipment installed to allow her to communicate with Royal Air Force aircraft during combat against German aircraft and S-boats (the motor torpedo boats known to the Allies as "E-boats"), as well as "Headache" (also known as "Y Outfit") radio receivers for the interception of E-boat communications.

After the surrender of Germany in early May 1945, Vega operated in support of Allied reoccupation forces in Europe during the summer of 1945.

== Decommissioning and disposal ==
After the armistice with Japan brought World War II to an end on 15 August 1945, Vega was decommissioned and placed in reserve. She was sold on 4 March 1947 to BISCO for scrapping by Clayton and Davies at Dunston on Tyne and arrived at the shipbreaker's yard on 26 March 1947.

== Bibliography ==
- Campbell, John (1985). Naval Weapons of World War II. Annapolis, Maryland: Naval Institute Press. ISBN 0-87021-459-4.
- Chesneau, Roger, ed. (1980). Conway's All the World's Fighting Ships 1922–1946. Greenwich, UK: Conway Maritime Press. ISBN 0-85177-146-7.
- Colledge, J. J.; Warlow, Ben (2006) [1969]. Ships of the Royal Navy: The Complete Record of All Fighting Ships of the Royal Navy from the 15th Century to the Present (3rd Rev ed.). London: Chatham Publishing. ISBN 978-1-86176-281-8. OCLC 67375475.
- Cocker, Maurice (1981). Destroyers of the Royal Navy, 1893–1981. Ian Allan. ISBN 0-7110-1075-7.
- Friedman, Norman (2009). British Destroyers From Earliest Days to the Second World War. Annapolis, Maryland: Naval Institute Press. ISBN 978-1-59114-081-8.
- Gardiner, Robert & Gray, Randal, eds. (1985). Conway's All the World's Fighting Ships 1906–1921. Annapolis, Maryland: Naval Institute Press. ISBN 0-85177-245-5.
- Lenton, H. T. (1998). British & Empire Warships of the Second World War. Annapolis, Maryland: Naval Institute Press. ISBN 1-55750-048-7.
- March, Edgar J. (1966). British Destroyers: A History of Development, 1892–1953; Drawn by Admiralty Permission From Official Records & Returns, Ships' Covers & Building Plans. London: Seeley Service. OCLC 164893555.
- Preston, Antony (1971). 'V & W' Class Destroyers 1917–1945. London: Macdonald. OCLC 464542895.
- Raven, Alan & Roberts, John (1979). 'V' and 'W' Class Destroyers. Man o'War. Vol. 2. London: Arms & Armour. ISBN 0-85368-233-X.
- Rohwer, Jürgen (2005). Chronology of the War at Sea 1939–1945: The Naval History of World War Two (Third Revised ed.). Annapolis, Maryland: Naval Institute Press. ISBN 1-59114-119-2.
- Whinney, Bob (2000). The U-boat Peril: A Fight for Survival. Cassell. ISBN 0-304-35132-6.
- Whitley, M. J. (1988). Destroyers of World War 2. Annapolis, Maryland: Naval Institute Press. ISBN 0-87021-326-1.
- Winser, John de D. (1999). B.E.F. Ships Before, At and After Dunkirk. Gravesend, Kent: World Ship Society. ISBN 0-905617-91-6.
