= List of North Shore Country Day School people =

This is a list of notable alumni from North Shore Country Day School, a private K-12 school in Winnetka, Illinois, a northern suburb of Chicago

- Richard Appel 1981 - Executive producer and co-showrunner for Family Guy
- William C. Bartholomay 1946 - Insurance executive and the former owner of the Atlanta Braves responsible for moving them from Milwaukee;
- Merle Chambers 1964 - Lawyer, business executive, philanthropist
- Joel de la Fuente 1987 - Actor in film, television and theater
- Roger Fisher 1939 - Harvard Law School professor and former Director of the Harvard Negotiation Project
- Thomas F. Geraghty 1962 - Co-director of the Northwestern University Legal Clinic
- Jessica Harper 1967 - Actress, producer, singer, author
- John A. Howard 1939 - Founder of the Rockford Institute
- Bruce Jarchow 1966 - Film and TV actor
- John R. MacArthur 1974 - President of Harper's Magazine
- John Macy 1934 - Chairman of United States Civil Service Commission, recipient of Presidential Medal of Freedom
- Richard Marx 1981 - Adult contemporary singer, songwriter and record producer
- Dick Meyer 1976 - Journalist and producer, CBS News, BBC America and NPR
- Alex Moffat 2000 - Saturday Night Live cast member
- Francis Daniels Moore 1931 - former Professor of Surgery at Harvard Medical School and member of the first surgical team to perform a human organ transplant
- Garrett Muscatel 2016 - Member of the New Hampshire House of Representatives from the Grafton 12th district and youngest openly LGBTQ+ politician in the country
- Charles Hamilton Newman 1956 - Author, Northwestern University English professor
- James L. Oakes 1941 - Former Senior Judge of U.S. Court of Appeals for the Second Circuit
- John Ott 1927 - Creator of time-lapse photography
- Michael Reinsdorf 1985 - President of the Chicago Bulls
- Jereme Richmond 2010 - Former shooting guard for the Delaware 87ers
- Katherine Sanford 1933 - American cell biologist and developer of the first lab test for Alzheimer's disease
- John Baker Saunders 1972 - Founding member and bassist for grunge rock supergroup Mad Season
- Aaron Swartz 2004 - Computer programmer, writer, political organizer and Internet activist
- Jory Vinikour 1981 - Harpsichordist
- Stokely Webster 1930 - Impressionist
- Pete Wentz 1997 - Bassist, lyricist, and backup vocals for Fall Out Boy
- Rocky Wirtz 1971 - Owner of the Chicago Blackhawks
- Anne Young 1965 - Former Chief of Neurology at Massachusetts General Hospital and current Professor of Neurology at Harvard Medical School
- Peyton Young 1962 - game theorist, Centennial Professor at the London School of Economics and former President of the Game Theory Society
- Peter Callahan 2009 - Belgian-American middle-distance runner
- Aaron Regunberg 2008 - Former member of the Rhode Island House of Representatives 2015-2019
