= Charles Stewart =

Chuck, Charlie or Charles Stewart may refer to:

== Academics ==
- Charles Stewart (orientalist) (1764–1837), British author, translator and scholar
- Charles Stewart (zoologist) (1840–1907), English comparative anatomist and lecturer
- Charles Hunter Stewart (1854–1924), Scottish physician, public health expert and professor
- Charles Stewart III, American author and professor of political science at MIT since 1985

== Military officers ==
- Charles Stewart (British Army officer) (1775–1812), battalion commander who died in the Napoleonic Wars
- Charles Stewart (United States Navy officer) (1778–1869), naval officer in the War of 1812
- Charles Seaforth Stewart (1823–1904), American Civil War colonel in Army Corps of Engineers
- Charles Edward Stewart (British Army officer) (1868–1916)

== Performers ==
- Charles Henry Hylton Stewart (1849–1922), English clergyman and organist
- Charles Hylton Stewart (1884–1932), his son, English cathedral organist
- Charles Stewart (actor) (1923–2016), American performer and tennis player
- Charles Stewart (rapper) (born 1971), American performer; stage name Chali 2na
- Charlie Stewart (actor) (born 1993), American actor

== Politicians ==
- Charles Stewart, 3rd Duke of Richmond (1639–1672), English peer; sat in Convention Parliament
- Charles Stewart (Royal Navy officer) (1681–1741), English military and political figure
- Charles Stewart, Irish MP for County Cavan during 1783–87 and 1790–93
- Charles Stewart (New Jersey politician) (1729–1800), American Continental Congress delegate, 1784–85
- Charles Stewart (bishop) (1775–1837), Church of England clergyman, bishop and Lower Canada politician
- Charles William Stewart (1778–1854), Irish soldier in British Army; later Charles William Vane, 3rd Marquess of Londonderry
- Charles Bellinger Stewart (1806–1885), American political leader in Texas Republic
- Charles Stewart (Harris County politician) (1836–1895), American state senator from Texas, 1879–1883
- Charles Stewart (Australian politician) (1844–1919), member of Tasmanian Parliament
- Charles H. Stewart (1867–1936), American mayor of Melbourne, Florida (1890–1891, 1902–1905)
- Charles Stewart (premier) (1868–1946), Canadian premier of Alberta, 1917–1921
- Charles Wallace Stewart (1885–1948), Canadian member of parliament for Humboldt, Saskatchewan
- Charles Stewart (Wainwright MLA) (1917–1991), Canadian member of the Alberta Legislative Assembly, 1975–1982
- Charles Stewart (Northern Ireland politician) (c. 1913–1985), Northern Ireland House of Commons independent member, 1958–1966
- Charles D. Stewart (1919–1986), American politician from Florida
- Charles Stewart (Arkansas politician) (1927–2021), American state representative from Arkansas

== Sportsmen ==
=== Footballers ===
- Charlie Stewart (footballer, born 1880) (1880–1957), Australian full-forward and World War I veteran
- Charlie Stewart (footballer, born 1922) (1922–1997), Australian rules player and coach
- Charlie Stewart (soccer, born 1928), Australian association player
- Charlie Stewart (footballer, born 1939) (1939–2024), Australian wingman and coach
- Charlie Stewart (Scottish footballer), outside left during late 1950s early 1960s

=== Other sportsmen ===
- Charles Stewart (sport shooter) (1881–1965), English Olympic sport shooter
- Charles Stewart (ice hockey) (1895–1973), Canadian goaltender for Boston Bruins, 1924–27
- Charles Stewart (rugby union) (1860–1890), Scottish rugby union player
- Charlie Stewart (rugby union) (1936–1998), Scottish rugby union player

== Others ==
- Charles Stewart (customs official), Scottish customs official and merchant in the 1772 Somerset Case
- Charles Stewart, 7th Earl of Traquair (1746–1827), Scottish landowner
- Charles Stewart (diplomat) (1907–1979), British ambassador to Iceland and Libya
- Charles E. Stewart Jr. (1916–1994), American federal judge
- Chuck Stewart (1927–2017), American photographer of jazz singers and musicians
- Charles Stewart (minister) (1946–2025), Church of Scotland priest
- Charles Henry Stewart (1824–1894), Ceylon judge
- Charles Jacob Stewart (1898–1987), banking executive and chairman of Manufacturers Hanover Trust Company
- Charles F. Stewart (born 1969), American business executive

== Places ==
- Mount Charles Stewart, in Canada's Banff National Park

== See also ==
- Charles Stuart (disambiguation)
- Charles Vane-Tempest-Stewart (disambiguation)
