= Charles Edward Stuart (disambiguation) =

Charles Edward Stuart (1720–1788) was the 18th century claimant to the title 'Prince of Wales' also known as Bonnie Prince Charlie.

Charles Edward Stuart or Stewart may also refer to:

- Charles Edward Stuart, Count Roehenstart (c. 1784 – 1854), the aforementioned pretender's illegitimate grandson
- Charles E. Stuart (1810–1887), Michigan politician and US senator
- Charles E. Stuart (Virginia politician) (1850–1889)
- Charles Edward Stewart (British Army officer) (1868–1916)

== See also ==
- Charles Stuart (disambiguation)
