= Charles J. Stewart =

Charles J. Stewart may refer to:

- Charles Stewart (actor), American film and television actor
- Charles J. Stewart (business), chairman of Manufacturers Hanover Trust Company

== See also ==
- Charles Stewart (disambiguation)
