= Charles Tempest =

Charles Tempest may refer to:

- Sir Charles Tempest, 1st baronet of the Tempest family

== See also ==
- Charles Tempest-Hicks
- Charles Vane-Tempest-Stewart (disambiguation)
