= Charles Sturt (disambiguation) =

Charles Sturt (1795–1869) was an English explorer of Australia.

Charles Sturt may also refer to:

== People ==
- Charles Napier Sturt (1832–1886), MP for Dorchester
- Charles Sturt (1763–1812), MP for Bridport

== Other uses ==
- City of Charles Sturt, a local government area in the western suburbs of Adelaide, South Australia
- Charles Sturt University, a university in Australia

== See also ==
- Charles Stuart (disambiguation)
- Charles Sturt Adelaide International
