= Charles Arthur Stuart =

American physician and professor of bacteriology (1893–1962)

- Born: May 26, 1893; Lyon Mountain, New York, U.S.
- Died: October 17, 1962 (aged 69); Providence, Rhode Island, U.S.
- Resting place: Swan Point Cemetery
- Education: Brown University
- Scientific career
- Fields: Bacteriology

Charles Arthur Stuart (May 26, 1893 – October 17, 1962) was an American physician and professor of bacteriology. He was the president of the American Society for Microbiology (ASM) in 1956.

== Biography ==
After education in public schools at Plattsburgh, New York, Stuart matriculated in 1914 at Brown University. There he graduated with a bachelor's degree in 1919, an M.S. in 1921, and a Ph.D. in 1923. His Ph.D. thesis is entitled The Effect of Environmental Changes on the Growth, Morphology, Physiology and Immunological Characteristics of Bacterium typhosum. From 1917 to 1918 he served in the Brown Ambulance Unit of the American Volunteer Motor Ambulance Corps. In the bacteriology department of Brown University, he was an instructor from 1923–1925, an assistant professor from 1925–1931, an associate professor from 1931 to 1944, and a full professor from 1944 until his retirement in 1960 as professor emeritus. For 35 years, he was a part-time teacher of student nurses at Rhode Island Hospital. He served as a consultant in bacteriology for several Rhode Island hospitals as a member of the Milk Commission of the Providence Medical Association.

Stuart was the author or coauthor of more than 100 scientific papers. In the early part of his career, he worked with Frederic Poole Gorham and Charles V. Chapin on laboratory aspects of public health in Providence, Rhode Island. In the late 1920s he became interested in the findings of Arthur M. Banta concerning sex-determining factors in the water flea Moina macrocopa. Stuart collaborated on a number of scientific papers concerning such factors, especially the availability of bacteria as a food source for the water fleas. In the mid-1930s he did research on Forssman antigens in mononucleosis. He did important research on the taxonomy of the family Enterobacteriaceae.

Stuart was elected in 1933 a fellow of the American Association for the Advancement of Science.

He married in 1924 and his wife often helped him with laboratory work. He is buried in Swan Point Cemetery.

== Selected publications ==
- Stuart, Charles A. (1924). "The Effect of Environmental Changes on the Growth, Morphology, Physiology and Immunological Characteristics of Bacterium typhosum". Journal of Bacteriology. 9 (6): 581–602. doi:10.1128/jb.9.6.581-602.1924. PMC 379091. PMID 16559070.
- Stuart, C. A. (1936). "Infectious Mononucleosis". Archives of Internal Medicine. 58 (3): 512–522. doi:10.1001/archinte.1936.00170130141008.
- Wheeler, K. M.; Sawin, P. B.; Stuart, C. A. (May 1939). "Group-Specific Agglutinins in Rabbit Serums for Human Cells: V. Inheritance of the a Character". The Journal of Immunology. 36 (5): 349–359. doi:10.4049/jimmunol.36.5.349.
- Kidder, G. W.; Stuart, C. A. (1939). "Growth Studies on Ciliates. I. The Role of Bacteria in the Growth and Reproduction of Colpoda". Physiological Zoology. 12 (4): 329–340. doi:10.1086/physzool.12.4.30151511. S2CID 87420156.
- Stuart, C. A.; Mickle, Friend Lee; Borman, Earle K. (1940). "Suggested Grouping of Slow Lactose Fermenting Coliform Organisms". American Journal of Public Health and the Nation's Health. 30 (5): 499–508. doi:10.2105/AJPH.30.5.499. PMC 1530795. PMID 18015219.
- Stuart, C. A.; Wheeler, K. M.; Sawin, P. B. (1940). "Genetic Constitution in the Rabbit and Antibody Production". American Journal of Public Health and the Nation's Health. 30 (7): 775–778. doi:10.2105/AJPH.30.7.775. PMC 1531123. PMID 18015260.
- Rustigian, R.; Stuart, C. A. (1941). "Decomposition of Urea by Proteus". Experimental Biology and Medicine. 47: 108–112. doi:10.3181/00379727-47-13054. S2CID 87209404.
- Stuart, C. A.; Zimmerman, Alice; Baker, Muriel; Rustigian, Robert (1942). "Eijkman Relationships of the Coliform and Related Bacteria". Journal of Bacteriology. 43 (5): 557–572. doi:10.1128/jb.43.5.557-572.1942. PMC 373625. PMID 16560521.
- Stuart, C. A.; Wheeler, K. M.; Rustigian, Robert; Zimmerman, Alice (1943). "Biochemical and Antigenic Relationships of the Paracolon Bacteria". Journal of Bacteriology. 45 (2): 101–119. doi:10.1128/jb.45.2.101-119.1943. PMC 373720. PMID 16560614.
- Wallick, H.; Stuart, C. A. (1943). "Antigenic Relationships of Escherichia coli Isolated from One Individual". Journal of Bacteriology. 45 (2): 121–126. doi:10.1128/jb.45.2.121-126.1943. PMC 373721. PMID 16560615.
- Wheeler, K. M.; Stuart, C. A.; Ewing, W. H. (1946). "Antigenic Complex of Shigella paradysenteriae, Boyd Type P274". Journal of Bacteriology. 51 (2): 169–176. doi:10.1128/jb.51.2.169-176.1946. PMC 518036. PMID 21018687. S2CID 34252542.
- Wheeler, K. M.; Stuart, C. A. (1946). "The Mannitol negative Shigella Group". Journal of Bacteriology. 51 (3): 317–325. doi:10.1128/jb.51.3.317-325.1946. PMC 518061. PMID 21018707. S2CID 29776016.
- Stuart, C. A.; Wheeler, K. M.; McGann, Virginia (1946). "Further Studies on One Anaerogenic Paracolon Organism, Type 29911". Journal of Bacteriology. 52 (4): 431–438. doi:10.1128/jb.52.4.431-438.1946. PMC 518208. PMID 16561196.
- Stuart, C. A.; Formal, Samuel; McGann, Virginia (1949). "Further Studies on B5W, an Anaerogenic Group in the Enterobacteriaceae". The Journal of Infectious Diseases. 84 (3): 235–239. doi:10.1093/infdis/84.3.235. JSTOR 30089561. PMID 18127632.
- Lawson, Herman A.; Stuart, C. A.; Paull, Alton M.; Phillips, Arthur M.; Phillips, Roswell W. (1955). "Observations on the Antibody Content of the Blood in Patients with Multiple Myeloma". New England Journal of Medicine. 252 (1): 13–18. doi:10.1056/NEJM195501062520103. PMID 13223971. 1955
