= Charles Vane (disambiguation) =

Charles Vane (died 1721) was an English pirate.

Charles Vane may also refer to:

- Charles Vane, 3rd Marquess of Londonderry (1778–1854)
- Charles Vane (actor) (1860–1943), British stage and film actor

== See also ==
- Charles Vane-Tempest-Stewart (disambiguation)
