= Merle Chambers =

American lawyer and business executive (born 1946)

- Born: 1946 (age 79–80); Chicago, Illinois, US
- Education: B.A. political science, University of California, Berkeley, 1968; J.D., University of California, Hastings College of the Law; M.A., tax law, University of Denver
- Occupations: President and CEO
- Years active: 1997—present
- Employer: Leith Ventures LLC
- Known for: President & Chair, Merle Chambers Fund
- Awards: Colorado Women's Hall of Fame (2004); Rocky Mountain Oil & Gas Hall of Fame (2009); Colorado Business Hall of Fame (2010)

Merle Catherine Chambers (born 1946) is an American lawyer, business executive, and philanthropist. She was founder and CEO of Axem Resources, a private oil and gas exploration and production company, from 1980 to 1997, and since 1997 is the president and CEO of Leith Ventures, a private investment firm. She chairs the Merle Chambers Fund (formerly Chambers Family Fund), which supports equity, democracy and women's economic security. She is a political contributor in Colorado, focusing on Democratic and women candidates. The recipient of numerous awards and honors, she was inducted into the Colorado Women's Hall of Fame in 2004, the Rocky Mountain Oil & Gas Hall of Fame in 2009, and the Colorado Business Hall of Fame in 2010.

== Early life and education ==
Chambers was born in Chicago, Illinois, the daughter of Jerry G. Chambers and Evelyn Hemmings Chambers. She graduated from the North Shore Country Day School in Winnetka in 1964.

She earned her B.A. in political science at the University of California, Berkeley in 1968, where she was a student protester in free speech and civil rights demonstrations. She earned her J.D. at the University of California, Hastings College of the Law and her M.A. in tax law at the University of Denver.

== Career ==
Chambers worked as an attorney in San Francisco before moving to Denver in 1977; she began working as an attorney in private practice in the latter city in 1978. In 1980 she founded and became chief executive officer of Axem Resources, a private oil and gas exploration and production firm, which she oversaw for 17 years until selling the company in 1997. Since 1997 she has been president and CEO of Leith Ventures, a private investment firm.

== Philanthropy ==
Original home of the Kirkland Museum of Fine & Decorative Art in Denver

In 1997 she established the Chambers Family Fund (renamed the Merle Chambers Fund). This private foundation supports social justice and equity, and women's economic security. Historically, the foundation also supported early education. The fund established women's foundations in Wyoming and Montana in 1999 and in Oklahoma in 2003. Chambers was a significant donor for the establishment of the Merle Catherine Chambers Center for the Advancement of Women at the University of Denver. The foundation has supported various arts and culture organizations in Colorado, including the Denver Art Museum, which features the Merle Chambers and Hugh Grant Modern Gallery; the Colorado Ballet; the Ellie Caulkins Opera House at the Denver Performing Arts Complex, to which the fund gave $2 million to Denver Arts & Venues toward the opening of the Chambers Grant Salon; the Clyfford Still Museum; and Kirkland Museum of Fine & Decorative Art. Merle's vision and financial support, both individually and through Chambers Fund, was instrumental to the development of Kirkland Museum's collection over the years. In 2018, the building housing the museum opened in the Golden Triangle neighborhood. The original studio building was relocated to the new location at 1201 Bannock Street in Denver, a move championed by Merle. Kirkland Museum became part of the Denver Art Museum in October 2024, and is now called "The Kirkland".

In 2020, Merle Chambers launched Chambers Initiative. Merle Chambers and Merle Chambers Fund partnered in this broader philanthropic endeavor in the areas of social justice, democracy, and women's economic security. The goal of Chambers Initiative was ensuring that more people - particularly those most impacted by economic, social, and political injustice - had a good chance to reach their full potential.

In 2024, after 40 years and more than $140M in grantmaking, Merle Chambers Fund completed a spend-down of its endowment, ceasing operations. The Initiative also closed at the end of 2024, in alignment with Merle's retirement.

=== Political contributor ===
Chambers is an active contributor to state and national political campaigns. During the 1992 United States presidential election, she and Swanee Hunt hosted a $1,000-per-person fund-raising event called "Serious Women, Serious Issues, Serious Money". They chose to feature the Democratic candidates' wives, Hillary Clinton and Tipper Gore, rather than the male candidates themselves. While setting a fundraising goal of $1 million, they also invited 300 women whom they knew could not contribute large sums but who could participate in the exchange of ideas. According to Mother Jones, Chambers contributed $210,000 in soft money donations to the Democratic Party in 1992. In 2015 Chambers and her (then) husband Hugh A. Grant co-hosted one fundraiser to benefit Hillary Clinton's 2016 presidential campaign.

A 2014, a Rocky Mountain News report identified Chambers as one of Colorado's top 10 political contributors between 2011 and 2013, with $430,260 in contributions. The report noted that "[m]any of Chambers' contributions focus on Democratic female leadership, including Sen. Jeanne Shaheen of New Hampshire, Sen. Claire McCaskill of Missouri and Sen. Heidi Heitkamp of North Dakota".

During the 2024 elections, Chambers donated $200,000 to support Colorado Amendment 79, a measure to ensure abortion access in the state.

== Affiliations and memberships ==
Chambers was the first woman to be inducted into the Independent Petroleum Association of Mountain States. She has represented the state of Colorado as an advisory board member of the National Petroleum Council, and was a delegate to the White House Conference on Small Business.

She is a founding member and past president (1992) of the Women's Foundation of Colorado. She has been a trustee of the Temple Hoyne Buell Foundation and as a board member of the Aspen Music Festival and School, the Colorado Women's Forum, the Colorado Forum, the Denver Health and Hospitals Authority, and the Cherry Hills Village Council.

== Awards and honors ==
Chambers was inducted into the Colorado Women's Hall of Fame in 2004, the Rocky Mountain Oil & Gas Hall of Fame in 2009, and the Colorado Business Hall of Fame in 2010. She received the Korbel Humanitarian Award and the Evans Award from the University of Denver. She received the 2016 Community Service Award from the Bonfils–Stanton Foundation and was the 2017 Denver Stories honoree of the Curious Theatre Company. President Joseph R. Biden, Jr. appointed Merle to the President's Advisory Committee on the Arts in 2022.

== Personal life ==
Chambers is divorced from Hugh A. Grant, founding director and curator of the Kirkland Museum of Fine & Decorative Art in Denver. Their home was noted for its art collection, considered "one of the best collections of 20th-century decorative arts in the United States".

Chambers is the third woman to have reached both the North and South Poles by plane.

== Sources ==
- Witt, Linda; Matthews, Glenna; Paget, Karen M. (1995). Running as a Woman: Gender and Power in American Politics. Simon and Schuster. ISBN 143910610X.
