= Arthur Stanley-Clarke =

English cricketer and Army officer

Brigadier Arthur Stanley-Clarke CBE DSO
- Born: 30 June 1886; Brighton, Sussex, England
- Died: 8 January 1983 (aged 96); Howth Head, Leinster, Ireland
- Military career
- Allegiance: United Kingdom
- Branch: British Army
- Service years: 1906–1944
- Rank: Brigadier
- Commands: Lothian and Border District (1941–44); Edinburgh Area (1941); 154th (Argyll and Sutherland Highlanders) Brigade (1937–41); 10th (Service) Battalion, Cameronians (Scottish Rifles) (1916–18)
- Conflicts: First World War; Second World War
- Awards: Commander of the Order of the British Empire; Distinguished Service Order; Mentioned in Despatches; Legion of Honour (France); Croix de Guerre (France); Commander of the Order of Polonia Restituta (Poland)
- Cricket career

Cricket information
- Batting: Right-handed

Domestic team information
- Years: Team
- 1909: Dorset

Career statistics
Competition	First-class
Matches	5
Runs scored	262
Batting average	37.42
100s/50s	–/2
Top score	66
Catches/stumpings	1/–
- Source: Cricinfo, 21 March 2019

Brigadier Arthur Christopher Lancelot Stanley-Clarke, CBE, DSO (30 June 1886 – 8 January 1983) was a British Army officer and an English first-class cricketer. After attending Winchester College and the University of Oxford, Stanley-Clarke enlisted with the Cameronians (Scottish Rifles) in August 1909. In a military career which lasted until 1944, he fought in both the First World War and the Second World War. He was highly decorated, being awarded the Distinguished Service Order, Legion of Honour, Croix de Guerre and the Order of Polonia Restituta. He also played first-class cricket for the British Army cricket team.

== Early life and military career ==
Stanley-Clarke was born in Brighton and educated at Winchester College, before going up to the University of Oxford. He was commissioned into the British Army as a second lieutenant on the unattached list in June 1906, before joining the Cameronians (Scottish Rifles) in August 1909. He made appearance in minor counties cricket for Dorset in the 1909 Minor Counties Championship. He was promoted to the rank of lieutenant in June 1910.

Stanley-Clarke served during the First World War, in the early stages of which he was promoted to the rank of captain in November 1914, three months after the British entry into the war. He was wounded in action while in the trenches near Chamigny on the Western Front. He was promoted to the temporary rank of major in March 1916, and in December of the same year he was made an acting lieutenant colonel while commanding the 10th (Service) Battalion, Cameronians, part of the 15th (Scottish) Division. He was awarded the Distinguished Service Order in the 1918 New Year Honours, for conspicuous gallantry and devotion to duty when leading a counterattack. When he left his battalion in 1918, he was awarded the Legion of Honour and the Croix de Guerre by France.

== Inter-war military career ==
Stanley-Clarke was seconded in February 1922 to serve as an officer in charge of a contingent of gentlemen cadets at the Royal Military College, Sandhurst. He was promoted to the full rank of major in October 1923. In that same year, he made his debut in first-class cricket for the British Army cricket team against Oxford University at Oxford. He made five appearances in first-class cricket for the army in 1923–24, scoring 262 runs at an average of 37.42, with a high score of 66. While stationed at Curragh in Ireland in 1930, Stanley-Clarke met his future wife Olive Carroll-Leahy, with the couple marrying in June 1931. He was promoted to the rank of lieutenant colonel in April 1931, at which point he relinquished his position as the chief instructor of the small arms school at Hythe. By 1934, Stanley-Clarke had transferred to the Royal Scots Fusiliers. He was made a brevet colonel in October 1934, with him becoming the commandant and chief instructor of the small arms school at Netheravon on Salisbury Plain. He was promoted to the full rank of colonel in April 1935, with seniority antedated to October 1934. He became the commander of the 154th (Argyll and Sutherland Highlanders) Brigade, one of three brigades forming part of the 51st (Highland) Division, a Territorial Army formation, in November 1937, during the command of which he was granted the temporary rank of brigadier.

== Second World War and later life ==
During the Second World War, which began in September 1939, Stanley-Clarke commanded the 154th (Argyll and Sutherland Highlanders) Brigade during the Battle of France in mid-1940 and in the subsequent Dunkirk evacuation. He was appointed a Commander of the Order of the British Empire in October 1940, and in June 1941 was made an acting major general. In December 1943, he was appointed a Commander of the Order of Polonia Restituta by the Polish government-in-exile. He retired from active service in June 1944 and was granted the honorary rank of brigadier.

In retirement Stanley-Clarke lived with his wife at Earlscliffe House in Howth near Dublin. He became involved in Mercer's Hospital in Dublin, serving as its chairman. Stanley-Clarke died at Howth in January 1983, aged 96. At the time of his death he was thought to have been the oldest living English first-class cricketer. He was survived by his wife, who died in 1996 at the age of 100.
