= 154th Infantry Brigade (United Kingdom) =

Argyll and Sutherland Brigade 154th (3rd Highland) Brigade 154th Infantry Brigade
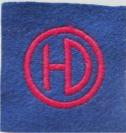
- 51st (Highland) Division's insignia from 1940 onwards (Note: The division was referred to as the "Highway Decorators" by other divisions who became used to discovering the 'HD' insignia painted wherever the Highlanders had passed through.)
- Active: 1902–1915; 1916–1919; 1920–1946; 1947–1967
- Country: United Kingdom
- Branch: British Army
- Type: Infantry
- Size: Brigade
- Part of: 51st (Highland) Division
- Garrison/HQ: Stirling
- Engagements: World War I: Battle of the Somme; Battle of Arras; Third Battle of Ypres; Battle of Cambrai; German spring offensive; Hundred Days Offensive; World War II; Battle of France; Battle of El Alamein; Tunisian campaign; Sicilian campaign; Normandy campaign; Reichswald; Rhine crossing

Commanders
- Notable commanders: Arthur Stanley-Clarke; Tom Rennie

The 154th Infantry Brigade was a formation of Britain's Territorial Force/Territorial Army that was part of 51st (Highland) Division in both World Wars. From its origins in the 19th Century Volunteer Force, it was based in Stirling and was composed of Highland battalions. It served on the Western Front in World War I, and after it escaped from France early in World War II it was reformed from its 2nd Line and saw action in North Africa, Sicily and Northwest Europe. It continued serving postwar until the reduction of the Territorial Army in the 1960s.

== Volunteer Force ==
The Volunteer Force of part-time military units formed in Great Britain after an invasion scare in 1859 had no higher organisation than the battalion until the Stanhope Memorandum of December 1888 proposed a comprehensive mobilisation scheme. Under this scheme Volunteer infantry battalions would assemble in their own brigades at key points in case of war. In peacetime these brigades provided a structure for collective training. Five Volunteer Infantry Brigades were initially formed in Scotland, covering the Highlands, the South of Scotland, and the Clyde, Forth and Tay estuaries. The Volunteer Battalions (VBs) of the Argyll and Sutherland Highlanders (A&SH) were initially assigned to the large Clyde Brigade (1st, 2nd, 3rd, 5th and 6th VBs, along with other regiments) and the Forth Brigade (4th and 7th VBs); in 1890 these brigades were rearranged, and the 4th and 7th VBs moved to the Tay Brigade. In the reorganisation at the end of the Second Boer War in 1902, the cumbersome Clyde Brigade was broken up and the seven VBs of the A&SHs formed their own brigade under the officer commanding the regimental district. This was also too large and was later split:

Argyll and Sutherland Brigade

- Headquarters (HQ) at Prince's Street, Stirling
- 3rd (Renfrewshire) Volunteer Battalion, A&SH, at Pollokshaws
- 4th (Stirlingshire) Volunteer Battalion, A&SH, at Stirling
- 7th (Clackmannan and Kinross) Volunteer Battalion, A&SH, at Alloa
- Army Service Corps Company

Clyde Brigade

- HQ at 34 Union Street, Greenock
- 1st (Renfrewshire) Volunteer Battalion, A&SH, at Greenock
- 2nd (Renfrewshire) Volunteer Battalion, A&SH, at Paisley
- 5th Volunteer Battalion, A&SH, at Dunoon
- 1st Dumbartonshire Volunteer Rifle Corps (6th Volunteer Battalion, A&SH) at Helensburgh

== Territorial Force ==
In 1908 the Volunteers were subsumed into the new Territorial Force (TF) The seven A&SH VBs had been reorganised into five TF battalions (the 5th (Renfrewshire) serving in Scottish Coast Defences) and the Argyll & Sutherland Brigade became the third brigade in the TF's new Highland Division. as follows:

- HQ at Princes Street, Stirling
- 6th (Renfrewshire) Battalion at 66 High Street, Paisley
- 7th Battalion at Princes Street, Stirling
- 8th (Argyllshire) Battalion at Dunoon
- 9th (The Dumbartonshire) Battalion at Hartfield House, Dumbarton

== World War I ==
=== Mobilisation ===
The Highland Division was at its annual camp in 1914 when it received orders to mobilise at 17.35 on 4 August and by 17 August had concentrated at its war stations round Bedford as part of First Army in Central Force. Although the TF was intended as a home defence force and its members could not be compelled to serve outside the UK, units were invited to volunteer for overseas service and the majority did so. Those who did not volunteer were formed into 2nd Line units and formations to train the mass of volunteers who were coming forward; these were given the prefix '2/' to distinguish them from the 1st Line. (193rd (2nd Argyll and Sutherland Highlanders) Brigade formed in 64th (2nd Highland) Division as a 2nd Line duplicate; this never saw action, but supplied drafts to the 1st Line.) Individual TF battalions began being sent to the Western Front to reinforce the British Expeditionary Force (BEF): the 1/7th A&SH left on 6 January 1915, and the 1/9th A&SH on 23 February. In April the whole of the Highland Division prepared to join the BEF, and two remaining battalions of the A&S Brigade transferred to bring the 1st Highland Brigade up to strength. The A&S Brigade was temporarily replaced in the division by the North Lancashire Brigade, which was designated 3rd Highland Brigade. The division completed its concentration on the Western Front on 6 May, and on 12 May it was designated 51st (Highland) Division, the brigade becoming 154th (3rd Highland) Brigade.

=== Reconstituted Brigade ===
On 6 January 1916 the North Lancashire Brigade was transferred (as the 164th (North Lancashire) Brigade) to the 55th (West Lancashire) Division, which was being reformed in France. At the same time 154th (3rd Highland) Brigade was reformed with Highland battalions:

- 1/9th (Highlanders) Bn, Royal Scots – joined 1 March 1916 from Third Army Troops; transferred to 61st (2nd South Midland) Division 6 February 1918
- 1/4th (Ross Highland) Bn, Seaforth Highlanders – joined 7 January 1916 from 15th (Scottish) Division
- 1/4th Bn, Gordon Highlanders – joined 23 February 1916 from 3rd Division
- 1/7th Bn, Argyll & Sutherland Highlanders – rejoined 1 March 1916 from 4th Division
- 154th Brigade Machine Gun Company – formed 14 January 1916'; transferred to No 51 Battalion, Machine Gun Corps, 19 February 1918
- 154/1 Trench Mortar Battery – joined on 17 March 1916
- 154/2 Trench Mortar Battery – joined by 10 May 1916; amalgamated with 154/1 into 154 TM Bty by 22 June

=== Service ===
After being reformed as a Highland Brigade, 154th Brigade was engaged in the following actions:

1916

- Battle of the Somme:
  - Attacks on High Wood, 21–30 July
  - Battle of the Ancre, 13–18 November
  - Capture of Beaumont-Hamel, 13 November

1917

- Battle of Arras:
  - First Battle of the Scarpe, 9–11 April
  - Second Battle of the Scarpe, 23–24 April
  - Capture and Defence of Rœux, 13–16 May
- Third Battle of Ypres:
  - Battle of Pilckem Ridge, 31 July–2 August
  - Battle of the Menin Road Ridge, 20–24 September
- Battle of Cambrai:
  - The Tank Attack, 10–21 November
  - Capture of Bourlon Wood, 23 November
  - German Counter-Attacks, 1–3 December

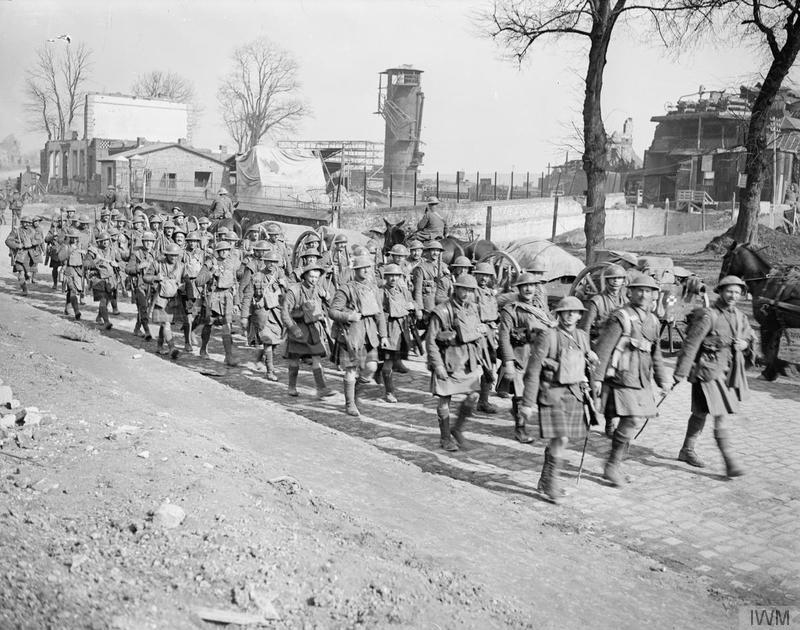
Battle of St Quentin: No 8 Platoon, B Company of the 1/7th Battalion, Argyll & Sutherland Highlanders retiring along the Cambrin road near Beaumetz.

1918

- German spring offensive:
  - Battle of St Quentin, 21–23 March
  - First Battle of Bapaume, 24–25 March
- Battle of the Lys:
  - Battle of Estaires (9–11 April)
  - Battle of Hazebrouck (12–15 April)
- Battle of Tardenois 20 –31 July
- Hundred Days Offensive:
  - Battle of the Scarpe, 26–30 August
  - Pursuit to the Selle, 11–12 October
  - Battle of the Selle, 17–25 October

After the Armistice with Germany in November 1918 51st (H) Division was billeted in the Scheldt Valley where demobilisation got under way. 1/4th Seaforth and 1/4th Gordons left the brigade and were posted to the Highland Division in the British Army of the Rhine. By the middle of March 1919 the remaining units had been reduced to cadre strength and left for home.

=== Commanders ===
The following officers commanded 154th (3rd Highland) Brigade during the war:

- Colonel St G.E.W. Burton, A&S Brigade 1 June 1911 (Brigadier-General from mobilisation) until 19 April 1915
- Brig-Gen C. E. Stewart, 6 January 1916, killed 14 September 1916
- Lieutenant-Colonel H.G. Hyslop, acting 14 September 1916
- Brig-Gen J.G.H. Hamilton, 17 September 1916
- Brig-Gen K.G. Buchanan, 26 September 1917

== Interwar ==
The TF was reconstituted on 7 February 1920 and was reorganised as the Territorial Army (TA) the following year, with some units having merged. The brigade was reformed as 154th (Argyll and Sutherland) Brigade:

- HQ at Drill Hall, Princes Street, Stirling
- 5th/6th (Renfrewshire) Bn, A&SH, at 76 High Street, Paisley
- 7th Bn, A&SH, at Drill Hall, Princes Street, Stirling
- 8th (The Argyllshire) Bn, A&SH, at Drill Hall, Queen Street, Dunoon
- 9th (Dumbartonshire) Bn, A&SH, Dumbarton Castle – left to form 54th (Argyll and Sutherland Highlanders) Light Anti-Aircraft Regiment, Royal Artillery, 28 November 1938

== World War II ==
=== Mobilisation ===
In the months before the outbreak of war the TA was doubled in size, with most units and formations creating duplicates. 28 Infantry Brigade was formed in 9th (Highland) Infantry Division formed the 2nd Line for 154 Brigade. After the TA was mobilised on 1 September 1939 154 Brigade had the following composition:

- 6th Bn, Black Watch
- 7th Bn, A&SH
- 8th (The Argyllshire) Bn, A&SH
- 154th Infantry Brigade Anti-Tank Company – formed 18 November 1939

=== Battle of France ===
The 51st (H) Division joined the British Expeditionary Force (BEF) in France, 154 Bde landing on 3 February 1940. The BEF had a policy of exchanging Regular and TA units to even up experience across formations: on 4 March 6th Black Watch was exchanged for 1st Black Watch from 4th Division. However, when the Phoney War ended with the German invasion of the Low Countries on 10 May, 51st (H) Division was detached and serving under French command on the Saar front. Cut off from the rest of the BEF, which was being evacuated from Dunkirk, the division retreated towards the coast. On 9 June Brig Arthur Stanley-Clarke and his 154 Brigade HQ was given command of an ad hoc group of divisional units and army units from the line of communication, designated 'Arkforce'.

==== Arkforce ====
In addition to 154 Bde, Arkforce comprised:

- 17th Field Regiment, Royal Artillery
- 75th (Highland) Field Regiment, Royal Artillery
- 204 (Oban) Anti-Tank Battery, 51st (West Highland) Anti-Tank Regiment, Royal Artillery
- 51st (Midland) Medium Regiment, Royal Artillery – with no guns
- 51st (H) Divisional Engineers:
  - 236th Highland (City of Aberdeen) Field Company, Royal Engineers
  - 237th Highland (City of Dundee) Field Company, Royal Engineers
  - 239th Highland Field Park Company, Royal Engineers
- 213th (North Midland) Army Field Company, Royal Engineers
- 'A' Brigade, Beauman Division – made up from personnel from the base depots on the lines of communication
  - 4th Battalion, The Border Regiment
  - 1/5th Battalion, The Sherwood Foresters
  - 4th Battalion, The Buffs (East Kent Regiment)
- Two companies, 1st Bn, Princess Louise's Kensington Regiment – machine guns

Arkforce fought a series of delaying actions, and while most of 51st (H) Division was forced to surrender at Saint-Valery-en-Caux on 12 June, the bulk of Arkforce was evacuated from Le Havre next days later in Operation Cycle.

On return to the UK, 154 Bde HQ was used during June and July 1940 to collect together the dratols of 51st (H) Division that had escaped from France. The decision was made to reconstitute the famous 51st (Highland) Division by redesignating its duplicate formation, the 9th (Highland) Division in Scottish Command, on 7 August. At the same time 154 Bde was brought back up to strength by absorbing 27 Brigade.

=== Reconstituted Brigade ===
The brigade was reconstituted as follows:

- 2nd Bn, Seaforths – transferred to 152 Bde 4 September 1940
- 7th/10th Bn, A&SH – became simply 7th A&SH 1 October 1942
- 11th (Argyll and Dumbarton) Bn, A&SH – transferred to 15th (Scottish) Division 22 September 1942
- 154th Infantry Brigade Anti-Tank Company – reformed 1 September 1940, left 2 January 1941 and became C Company 51st (Highland) Reconnaissance Battalion 8 January
- 1st Bn, Black Watch – rejoined 24 October 1940
- 7th Bn, Black Watch – joined 26 September 1941

=== Service ===
The 51st (Highland) Division sailed for Egypt on 16 June 1942 and 154 Bde was engaged in the following actions under its command during the war:

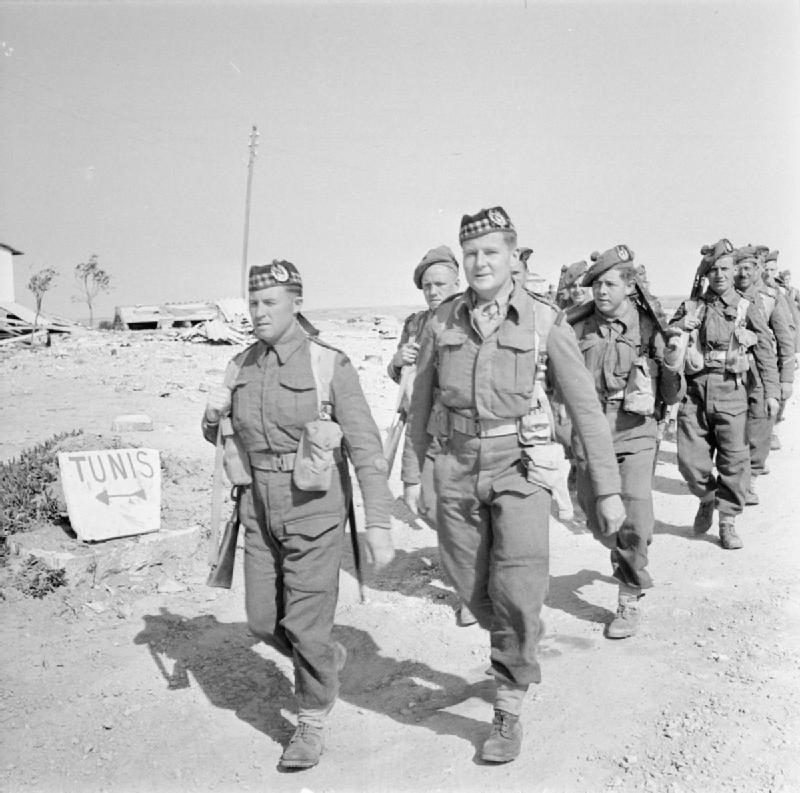
Men of the Gordon Highlanders cross the border into Tunisia, 1943.

1942

- Western Desert campaign:
  - Second Battle of El Alamein, 23 October–4 November

1943

- Tunisian campaign:
  - Battle of Medenine, 6 March
  - Battle of the Mareth Line, 16–31 March
  - Battle of Wadi Akarit, 6–7 April
  - Enfidaville (Operation Vulcan) 19–29 April
  - Tunis (Operation Strike), 5–12 May
- Sicilian campaign:
  - Landings (Operation Husky) 9–12 July
  - Adrano (Battle of Centuripe), 29 July–3 August

154 Brigade landed on mainland Italy as part of Operation Baytown on 5 September, but after holding the beachhead for a few days it was recalled to Sicily, arriving back on 8 September. It then sailed for the UK on 9 November with 51st (H) Division, which had been selected for the Allied invasion of Normandy (Operation Overlord).

1944

- Normandy campaign:
  - Operation Goodwood, 18–23 July
  - Battle of Falaise, 7–22 August
  - Le Havre (Operation Astonia), 10–12 September
- Reichswald (Operation Veritable), 8 February–10 March
- Rhine Crossing (Operation Plunder), 23 March –1 April

=== Commanders ===
The following officers commanded 154 Bde during the war:

- Brigadier Arthur Stanley-Clarke, 17 November 1937
- Lt-Col G.T. Nugee, acting 3 July 1940
- Brig A.C.L. Stanley Clarke, returned from 28 Bde 7 August 1940
- Brig. H.W Houldsworth, 6 January 1941
- Brig Tom Rennie, 14 December 1942, wounded 7 January 1943
- Lt-Col W.N. Roper-Caldbeck, acting 7 January 1943
- Brig J.E. Stirling, 10 January 1943
- Brig Tom Rennie, returned 13 May 1943
- Brig J.A. Oliver, 13 December 1943
- Lt-Col J.A. Hopwood, acting 15 January 1945
- Brig J.A. Oliver, returned 29 January 1945

== Postwar ==
The TA was reformed on 1 January 1947, with 154 (Highland) Brigade in 51st/52nd Scottish Division until the two divisions regained their independence in 1950. The TA's divisional/brigade structure disappeared with the reduction into the Territorial and Army Volunteer Reserve in 1967. The brigade's composition in 1947 was:

- 7 Bn, A&SH, Stirling
- 8 (The Argyllshire) Bn, A&SH, Dunoon
