= Katherine Sanford =

American cell biologist

- Born: July 19, 1915; Chicago, Illinois, US
- Died: September 12, 2005 (aged 90)
- Education: Wellesley College; Brown University
- Spouse: Charles F. R. Mifflin
- Scientific career
- Fields: Cell biology
- Workplaces: National Cancer Institute
- Thesis: The effect of temperature on the expression of intersexuality in Daphnia longispina (1942)
- Doctoral advisor: Arthur M. Banta

Katherine Koontz Sanford (July 19, 1915 – September 12, 2005), also known as Katherine Sanford Mifflin, was an American biologist and cancer researcher who worked at the National Cancer Institute for nearly 50 years, serving as head of Laboratory of Cellular and Molecular Biology. In the 1940s she became the first person to successfully clone a mammalian cell in vitro, which allowed for more efficient means of creating pure strains of cells for study. She also developed the first laboratory test to distinguish people with Alzheimer's disease and people predisposed to cancer.

== Early life and education ==
Sanford was born July 19, 1915, in Chicago, Illinois, to parents Alta Rache and William James Koontz. She was educated at North Shore Country Day School, a selective prep school in Winnetka, Illinois. She then attended Wellesley College with her two sisters. She graduated from Wellesley with an undergraduate degree in 1937. After receiving her undergraduate degree, she then attended Brown University, where she pursued a master's and doctorate in biology. She studied under zoologist Arthur M. Banta, and graduated with a Ph.D in 1942. She was one of a small distinguished group of women who attended Brown University's graduate biology program in the 1940s.

== Career ==
Katherine Sanford spent her first two postdoctoral years teaching biology. From 1941-1942 she taught biology, comparative anatomy, and immunology at Western College for Women in Oxford, Ohio and then moved to Allegheny College in Meadville, Pennsylvania from 1942-1943. Following her time as an instructor, Sanford joined Johns Hopkins School of Nursing in Baltimore, Maryland as assistant director of its science program. She held this position from 1943 to 1947. After her brief interval in teaching, she joined the National Cancer Institute (NCI) cancer laboratory in 1947, where she spent close to 50 years, and the rest of her career, working as a cancer research scientist.

Sanford began her career as a research scientist as part of the tissue culture section of the National Cancer Institute's Laboratory of Biology. It did not take her long to make an impact, as almost immediately after joining she made her largest discovery involving a method of cloning mammalian cancer cells in vitro. She was recognized with this discovery with the Ross Harrison Fellowship Award. In 1974 Sanford was appointed head of the cell physiology and oncogenesis section of the NCI's Laboratory of Biochemistry. Following this in 1977, Sanford was further promoted to the head of the in-vitro carcinogenesis section of the Laboratory of Cellular and Molecular Biology. From this position, which she held the rest of her career, she made two more iconic discoveries. In 1985, she designed a test that could recognize genetic predisposition for cancer. Building on this idea in the 90s, she created a test that could differentiate people with a genetic predisposition for cancer from those with Alzheimer's disease. After a 49-year career with the NCI, Stanford officially retired in December 1995, but stayed one extra year to complete her research.

Sanford was involved with various biology societies and associations over her career. She founding member of the American Association for Cancer Research. She served on various AACR committees during her career. Additionally, she was a member of the American Society for Cell Biology, the American Society of Human Genetics, the Tissue Culture Association, and the International Society for Cell Biology. In total, Sanford served as a board director or as a committee member on 23 scientific associations during the course of her career.

== Research ==
Starting in 1947 Katherine Sanford began her research career with the National Cancer Institute. Working with Dr. Virginia Evans and a group of tissue-culture workers she became the first to successfully clone a mammalian cell in vitro. This allowed the advancement of research on metabolic and genetic features of the clone cell. Prior to her discovery, tissue cultures had to be composed of multiple and various human body cells in order for them to survive and grow. Single cells separated out required the support of other cells in order to function and proliferate. Her research targeted isolated mammalian cells in vitro and finding ways to trigger malignant transformations and replication. She developed a method that could stimulate their propagation into identical descendants. Her experimental procedure required 929 iterations to find a combination of environmental and cell conditions that induced cloning. Sanford developed micropipettes where single cells could be picked up and isolated from under the microscope and placed in a detailed microenvironment, where diffusion of cellular products was restricted to inside a small closed culture. Her first success in duplicating an identical copy of a cell was with a mouse fibroblast. While her procedure was initial procedure was cumbersome and hard to duplicate, ultimately her cloning discovery paved the way for the production of pure cell lines and the culturing of viruses. Additionally, cloning allowed the development of new vaccines and advanced the study of stem cells.

Later in her career Sanford developed a cytogenetic assay test that could identify people with predispositions for Alzheimer's Disease and cancer. Her test required collecting, culturing, and testing skin fibroblasts or blood lymphocytes from the patients. The cell cultures were exposed to fluorescent light that damaged the DNA of the cells. Following this, they were treated with DNA repair inhibitors and compared for chromatid breaks. It was found that Alzheimer's and cancer patients had significantly more chromatid breaks under certain conditions, which allowed for the identification of these predispositions. Her work on this material was published in the Proceedings of the National Academy of Sciences in 1996.

Sanford has filed three patents for her work over her career. One of these, patented on June 12, 1990, has now expired. This patent was a process patent for detecting genetic susceptibility to cancer, involving the frequency of gaps and breaks in chromatid in metaphase skin fibroblasts. Two other patents are still active. These include a process patent approved on June 30, 1998 for the detection of Alzheimer disease using cultured cells, and a process patent approved on January 25, 2000 for identifying compounds that protect against fluorescent light and x-ray-induced DNA lesions.

== Awards and honors ==
In 1954, seven years after joining the NCI, Sanford was recognized with Ross Harrison Fellowship Award for her method of cloning mammalian cells. She was awarded the Lifetime Achievement Award from the Society for In Vitro Biology in 1977, and an honorary Doctor of Science degree from the Catholic University of America in 1988.

== Marriage and death ==
Sanford married Charles F. R. Mifflin in 1971. She died September 12, 2005, aged 90.

== Publications ==
- "Studies on the Difference in Sarcoma-Producing Capacity of Two Lines of Mouse Cells Derived in Vitro from One Cell"- Journal of National Cancer Institute, 1958
- "Familial Clustering of Breast Cancer: Possible Interaction Between DNA Repair Proficiency and Radiation Exposure in the Development of Breast Cancer"- International Journal of Cancer, 1995
- "Fluorescent Light-Induced Chromatid Breaks Distinguish Alzheimer Disease Cells from Normal Cells in Tissue Culture"- Proceedings of the National Academy of Sciences, 1996
