= Charles Newman (author) =

American novelist

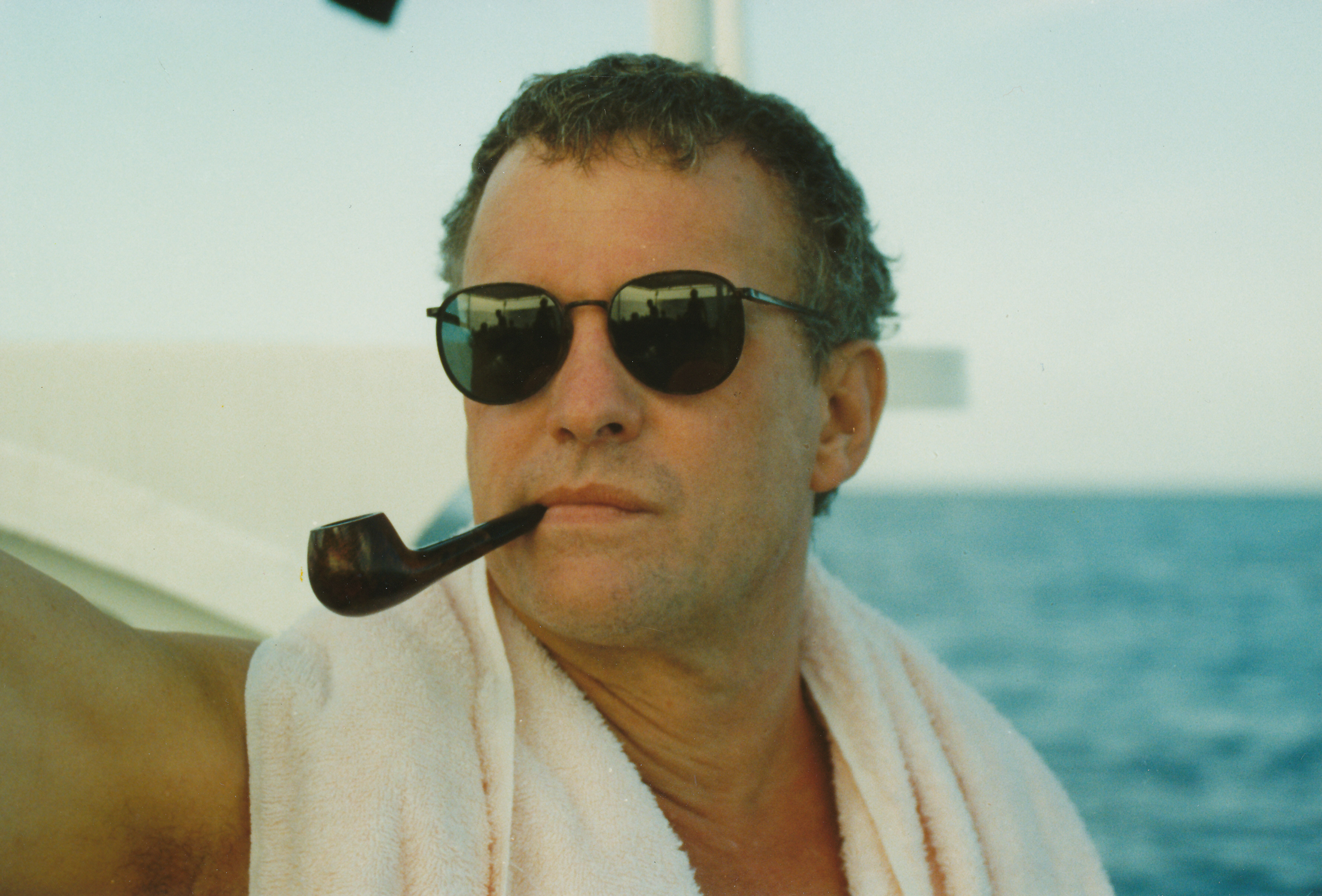
- Born: Charles Hamilton Newman; May 27, 1938; St. Louis, Missouri, U.S.
- Died: March 15, 2006 (aged 67); St. Louis, Missouri, U.S.
- Education: Yale University; Balliol College, Oxford
- Occupations: Writer; editor; teacher; dog breeder
- Employer(s): Northwestern University; Washington University in St. Louis

Charles Hamilton Newman (May 27, 1938 – March 15, 2006) was an American writer, editor and dog breeder, best known for the novel White Jazz.

== Life ==
Charles Newman was born in St. Louis, Missouri, which his family had lived in since "it was a little village of French and Spanish inhabitants." However, after World War II his father, a furniture salesman, moved Newman and his mother to a suburban housing tract north of Chicago, next to a horseradish bottling plant. A renowned high school athlete, Newman attended North Shore Country Day School in Winnetka, Illinois and led the school to championships in football, basketball and baseball.

At Yale University, Newman won the Bellamy Prize for best thesis in American history and dated author Carol Brightman; his best friend was the author Leslie Epstein. A Woodrow Wilson fellow and Fulbright recipient, he went on to study at Balliol College, Oxford, and spent time in the Air Force Reserve. After his discharge, he worked for Congressman Sidney R. Yates.

In 1963, Newman became an instructor in the English department at Northwestern University and took over the campus literary magazine, known as TriQuarterly, which he soon transformed into "an international journal showcasing the world's most eminent writers." In 1975 he left Northwestern to become director of the Johns Hopkins Writing Seminars, but withdrew from academia soon afterward to raise wirehaired vizslas in the Shenandoah Valley. In 1985, He was a professor in English in the Arts and Sciences at Washington University in St. Louis, and remained on the faculty there until his death in 2006.

Newman was married four times but had no children.

== Writing ==
Newman's first novel, New Axis, was published in 1966, and portrays the community of King's Kove, an affluent but ahistoric suburb resembling the one in which Newman grew up. The New York Times faulted New Axis for its "uncritical affection" toward a community that is "so bleak . . . that to come upon it even in a book is to be oppressed by its narrowness." However, Time called the book's satire "subtle and precise," and praised Newman's writing as "almost too elegant." Life called New Axis "one of the two or three fiction discoveries of the year."

Newman's second novel, The Promisekeeper, was published in 1971, and followed by A Child's History of America, a memoir of traveling in Europe and America in 1968. His other fiction includes a trio of novellas (There Must Be More to Love than Death) and White Jazz, a best-selling novel selected as one of the 100 Notable Books of 1984 by The New York Times.

== The Post-Modern Aura ==
Newman's best-known work is The Post-Modern Aura, a scathing critique of contemporary culture that, unusually for a work of criticism, was reviewed and discussed in over thirty magazines, including general interest publications such as Time. Newman's thesis is that post-modernism is characterized "not by style or particular intent, but by pure velocity," and that the acceleration of virtually everything in postmodern life, from the number of poetry collections published each year to the increasing value of the dollar, has created "cultural incoherence of the most destructive sort." The book was keenly praised by Christopher Lasch, Robert Hughes, Robert Boyers and other critics.

== Triquarterly ==
Under Newman, TriQuarterly offered an alternative to the conventional literary magazine of its time by combining adventurous taste in fiction (especially by American postmodern writers such as William Gass and Robert Coover), literature from abroad (in particular the Eastern Bloc and what was then the Third World), and critical theory, all packaged within an art-focused (as opposed to merely decorative) design. Early contributors included E. M. Cioran (translated into English for the first time), Susan Sontag, Richard Brautigan, Ian McEwan, Mario Vargas Llosa, Czesław Miłosz, Fredric Jameson, John Hawkes, Tom McGuane and Joyce Carol Oates, with whole issues devoted to Borges and Nabokov, among others. Contributing artists included Aaron Siskind and Leonard Baskin. Later editors from Bill Buford to Daniel Halpern have cited the influence of the early TriQuarterly.

== Awards and honors ==
- Morton Dauwen Zabel Award, National Institute of Arts and Letters, 1975
- Guggenheim Fellowship, 1974–75
- Rockefeller Grant for Creative Writing Fellowship, 1973
- National Endowment for Creative Writing Fellowship, 1974
- Best American Short Stories, 1972, 1977
- Woodrow Wilson Fellowship 1960–61
- Fulbright Grant, 1961–62

== Works ==
=== Novels ===
- New Axis, Houghton Mifflin Company, 1966
- The Promisekeeper, Simon and Schuster, 1971
- There Must Be More to Love Than Death, The Swallow Press, 1976
- White Jazz, Doubleday, 1983
- In Partial Disgrace, Dalkey Archive, 2013

=== Nonfiction ===
- A Child's History of America, The Swallow Press, 1973
- The Post-Modern Aura, Northwestern University Press, 1985

=== Books edited ===
- The Art of Sylvia Plath, Indiana University Press, 1970
- New Writing from East Europe, Indiana University Press, 1970
- New American Writers Under 30, Indiana University Press, 1970
- Nabokov: Criticism and Reminiscences, Translation and Tributes, Simon and Schuster, 1971
- Literature in Revolution, Northwestern University Press, 1974
- Prose for Borges, Northwestern University Press, 1974
