= Charles Stuart =

Charles Stuart may refer to:

== Royalty ==
- Charles I of England (1600–1649), Scottish and English king, executed
- Charles II of England (1630–1685), his son, Scottish and English king
- Charles Edward Stuart (1720–1788), a.k.a. "Bonnie Prince Charlie" or "The Young Pretender", Jacobite claimant to the thrones of Scotland, England and Ireland as Charles III

== Peers ==
- Charles Stuart, 5th Earl of Lennox (1557–1576)
- Charles Stuart, 6th Earl of Moray (died 1735)
- Charles Stuart, Duke of Kendal (1666–1667)
- Charles Stuart, Duke of Cambridge (1660–1661)
- Charles Stuart, Duke of Cambridge (1677)
- Charles Stuart, 12th Lord Blantyre (1818–1900), Scottish representative peer

== Politicians ==
- Charles Stuart (British Army officer, born 1810) (1810–1892), British Army general and member of parliament for Buteshire 1832–33
- Charles Stuart (Canadian politician) (1864–1926), Canadian politician and judge
- Charles Bingley Stuart (1857–1936), American judge
- Charles E. Stuart (1810–1887), United States senator from Michigan 1853–59
- Charles E. Stuart (Virginia politician) (1850–1889), speaker of the Virginia House of Delegates 1881–83
- Charles V. Stuart (1819–1880), California pioneer and delegate to the California Constitutional Convention
- Charles Stuart, 1st Baron Stuart de Rothesay (1779–1845), British diplomat, ambassador to France and to Russia

== Military ==
- Charles Stuart (East India Company officer) (c. 1758 – 1828), Irish-born British Army general
- Charles Gage Stuart (1887–1970), Royal Navy officer and head of the military government of Guernsey
- Charles Stuart (British Army officer, born 1753) (1753–1801), British general during the French Revolutionary Wars
- Charles Stuart (British Army officer, born 1810) (1810–1892), British Army general and member of parliament for Buteshire 1832–33

== Others ==
- Charles Stuart (painter) (1838–1907), British painter
- Charles Stuart (abolitionist) (1783–1865), Anglo-Canadian soldier, writer and abolitionist
- Charles Edward Stuart, Count Roehenstart (1784–1854)
- Charles B. Stuart (1814–1881), New York engineer/surveyor
- Chuck Stuart (ice hockey) (1935–2004), Canadian ice hockey player
- Charles Stuart (rugby union, born 1887) (1887–1982), Scottish rugby union player
- Charles Stuart (rugby union, born 1886) (1886–1958), Irish rugby union player
- Charles Stuart (1959–1990), American murderer, see murder of Carol Stuart
- Charles Stuart (runner) (1907–1970), Australian Olympic sprinter
- Charles Stuart of Dunearn (1745–1826), Scottish minister and co-founder of the Royal Society of Edinburgh
- Charles Arthur Stuart (1893–1962), American physician and professor of bacteriology
- Charlie Stuart (1894–1980), Irish hurler

== See also ==
- Charles Stewart (disambiguation)
- Charles Sturt (1795–1869), English explorer of Australia
