= North Shore Country Day School =

Location
- 310 Green Bay Road; Winnetka, Cook County, Illinois 60093-4094; United States; 42°5′55″N 87°43′45″W

Information
- Former names: Rugby School (1893-1900); Girton School (1900-1919)
- Type: Private country day school Co-educational
- Motto: Live and Serve
- Established: 1893
- Founder: Perry Dunlap Smith
- CEEB code: 144435
- Head of school: Thomas J. Flemma
- Faculty: 85
- Grades: JK–12
- Enrollment: 505
- Student to teacher ratio: 7:1
- Campus size: 16 acres (6.5 ha)
- Campus type: Suburban
- Colors: Purple and white
- Fight song: "O'er the Fields"]
- Team name: Raiders
- Accreditation: ISACS
- Publication: Acorn (administration newsletter); Prosody (literary magazine)
- Newspaper: Diller Street Journal
- Yearbook: Mirror
- Endowment: $42 million
- Tuition: $25,150 (2025-26 for JK) $29,075 (2025-26 for SK) $35,025 (2025-26 for 1st-5th) $39,027 (2025-26 for 6th-8th) $42,650 (2025-26 for 9-12th)
- Website: www.nscds.org
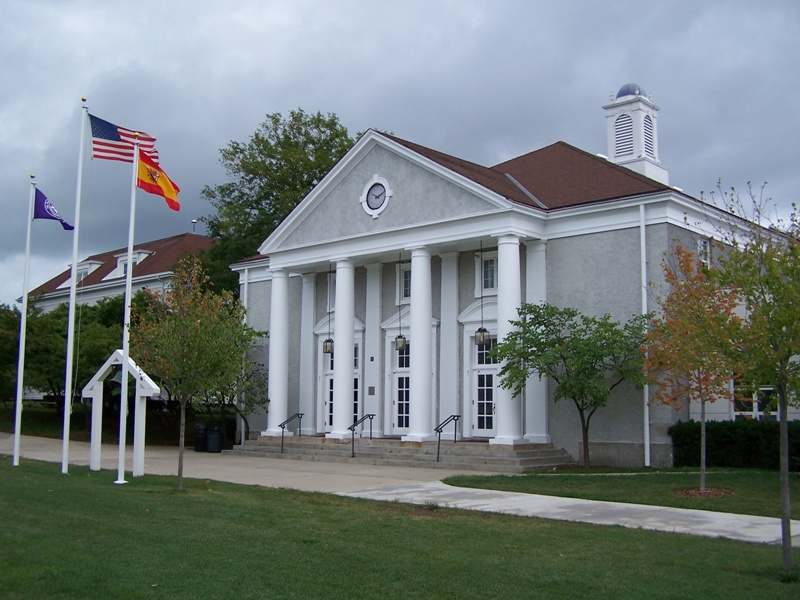
- Auditorium

North Shore Country Day School is an independent school in Winnetka, Illinois. It took its current form as a coeducational school in 1919 during the Country Day School movement, though it started as the Rugby School for Boys (1893-1900) and Girton School for Girls (1900-1918). It consists of a lower school, a middle school, and an upper school. North Shore Country Day School offers a liberal arts education with students representing the community's values of respect and inclusiveness.

== History ==
In 1893, Francis King Cook opened the Rugby School for Boys in the nearby village of Kenilworth, Illinois. Within the next decade, due to the opening of the fee-free Joseph Sears School, Cook moved his school to the present site today in Winnetka. Shortly after, the school reimagined itself as the Girton School For Girls. The school built three more buildings on what was then known as the Garland Estate, but by 1918-19, the school began to encounter funding difficulties. A group of parents and alumni from the Girton School and the local area came together in 1919 and chose Perry Dunlap Smith to found the North Shore Country Day School for girls and boys of all ages. With the popularity of the Country Day School movement, this was seen as the next logical step for the school. The school continues to have no class rankings and no academic awards. As it became clear the Country Day school would outlast its time as a traditional school, the founder and first headmaster Perry Dunlap Smith hired Chicago area architect Edwin H. Clark to redesign the school grounds.

The school was one of 27 schools selected from a group of 250 candidate schools in the U.S. chosen in 1933 for the Eight-Year Study: alternative admission standards for admission to 200 selective colleges. As a progressive country day school, there was to be an enriched core curriculum with independent study. The school sought to fit the curriculum to the students' needs rather than to require a fixed course of instruction.

At the height of the Civil Rights Movement in 1963, the school was one of 21 schools that publicly supported the Kennedy administration's policies of racial equality, stating that independent schools must offer the benefits of a quality education to all qualified students.

In July 2016, following the retirement of W. Thomas Doar III, Thomas J. Flemma became the ninth head of school in North Shore's history. Before being hired by North Shore, Flemma was the Associate Head of School and Dean of Faculty at the Hotchkiss School in Lakeville, Connecticut.

== Academics ==
=== Curriculum ===
The school follows a liberal arts curriculum, offering classes in literature, mathematics, social studies, the sciences, world languages, and the fine arts.

=== Rankings ===
In 2026, the school was ranked the 2nd best K-12 school in the state of Illinois (of 68) and 58th best in the country (of 3,055) according to Niche.

=== ACT results ===
For the Class of 2016, the middle 50% ACT range was 29-33. The exam is marked out of 36.

=== Post-secondary ===
Typically, 100% of NSCD seniors are offered admission to four-year colleges and universities. The Class of 2025 received offers from 135 colleges and universities in 35 states, the District of Columbia, Canada, Ireland and the United Kingdom.

== Service learning ==
The school's dedication to service learning extends throughout the campus into other continents. In 2007, the junior class, (class of 2008), decided to raise money for helping a village in Tanzania. They organized a read-a-thon and succeeded in raising almost $30,000 used towards buying land in Tanzania. Some of the students organized a trip to go to Tanzania at the end of the 2008 school year. Seniors are required to perform a Senior Service, a community service project lasting two full weeks. They can work with friends at any community service place. After the Senior Service ends, students create presentations and show the parents and students the results of their community service. This occurs in the last few weeks of the school year.

== Athletics ==
Physical education is required at all grade levels, and interscholastic competition is required of students in 6th to 11th grades. North Shore is a member of the Chicago Independent School League and competes against eight other secondary schools in the Chicago area. North Shore's main sports rivals include the Francis W. Parker School, Latin School of Chicago, and the University of Chicago Laboratory Schools.

As of 2019, the following sports were available:

Fall

- Cross Country (Boys and Girls varsity, boys JV, middle school)
- Field Hockey (girls: varsity, JV, middle school)
- Flag Football (coeducational: middle school)
- Golf (Boys and Girls: varsity, JV, Development)
- Soccer (boys: varsity, JV, middle school)
- Tennis (girls: varsity and JV)
- Volleyball (girls: varsity, JV, freshman/sophomore, middle school)

Winter

- Basketball (boys and girls: varsity, JV, freshman/sophomore, middle school)
- Paddle tennis (varsity)
- Track & Field (boys and girls: varsity)

Spring

- Baseball (boys: varsity, JV, middle school)
- Soccer (girls: varsity, JV, middle school)
- Tennis (boys: varsity, JV)
- Track & Field (coeducational varsity, middle school)

== Notable alumni ==
North Shore has a community of over 3,500 alumni residing in the United States and worldwide.

Notable alumni of North Shore in the arts include Richard Appel (1981), executive producer and co-showrunner for Family Guy; Richard Marx (1981), Grammy Award-winning musician and the first solo artist to have his first seven singles hit the Top 5 on the Billboard Hot 100 singles chart; Pete Wentz (1997), the bassist, lyricist, and backup vocalist for Fall Out Boy; John R. MacArthur (1974), President and Publisher of Harper's Magazine; Alex Moffat (2000), a Saturday Night Live cast member; and Jonathan Strong (1962), a critically acclaimed novelist. In sports, North Shore is represented by Jereme Richmond (attended for one year), former shooting guard for the Delaware 87ers and gold medalist with the United States team in the 2010 FIBA Americas Under-18 Championship; Peter Callahan (2009), an All-American and seven-time Ivy League title-winning middle distance runner while at Princeton University; William C. Bartholomay (1946), an insurance executive and the former owner of the Atlanta Braves responsible for moving them from Milwaukee; Michael Reinsdorf (1985), President of the Chicago Bulls; and Rocky Wirtz (1971), billionaire owner of the NHL's Chicago Blackhawks. North Shore alumni who played a role in politics include John Macy (1934), former Director of the Federal Emergency Management Agency and a recipient of the Presidential Medal of Freedom; Garrett Muscatel (attended for one year), member of the New Hampshire House of Representatives from the Grafton 12th district and youngest openly LGBT politician in the country; James L. Oakes (1941), former Vermont Attorney General and Chief Justice of the United States Court of Appeals for the Second Circuit; and Aaron Swartz (attended, but did not graduate), an internet activist, co-founder of Reddit and member of the RSS development team. In the sciences, North Shore is represented by Katherine Sanford (1933), an American cell biologist and developer of the first lab test for Alzheimer's disease; Francis Daniels Moore (1931), a former Professor of Surgery at Harvard Medical School and member of the first surgical team to perform a human organ transplant; and Anne Young (1965), former Chief of Neurology at Massachusetts General Hospital and current Professor of Neurology at Harvard Medical School.

Notable North Shore Country Day alumni include:

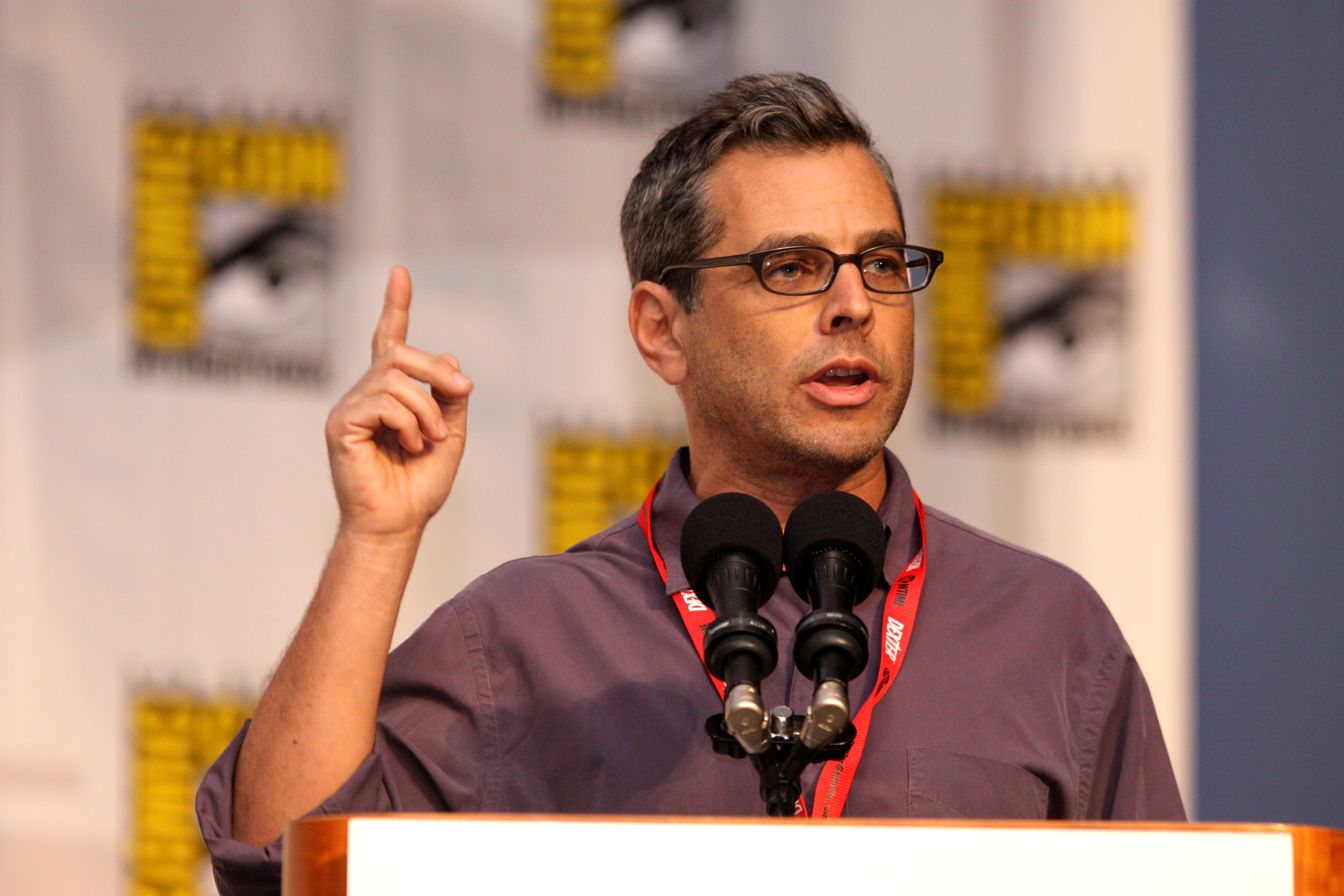
Family Guy executive producer and co-showrunner Richard Appel (1981)

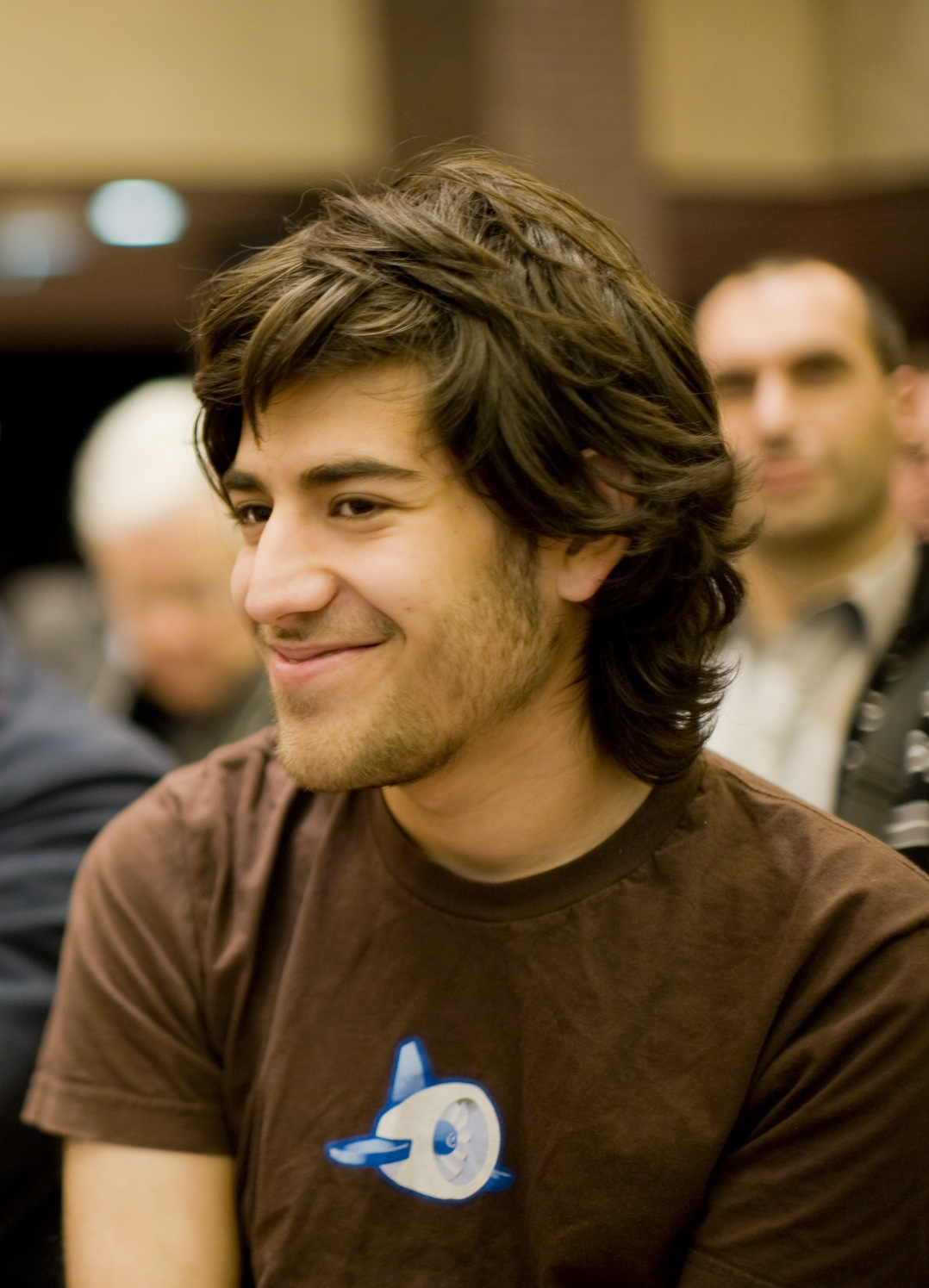
Co-founder of Reddit and member of the team that created RSS Aaron Swartz (attended)

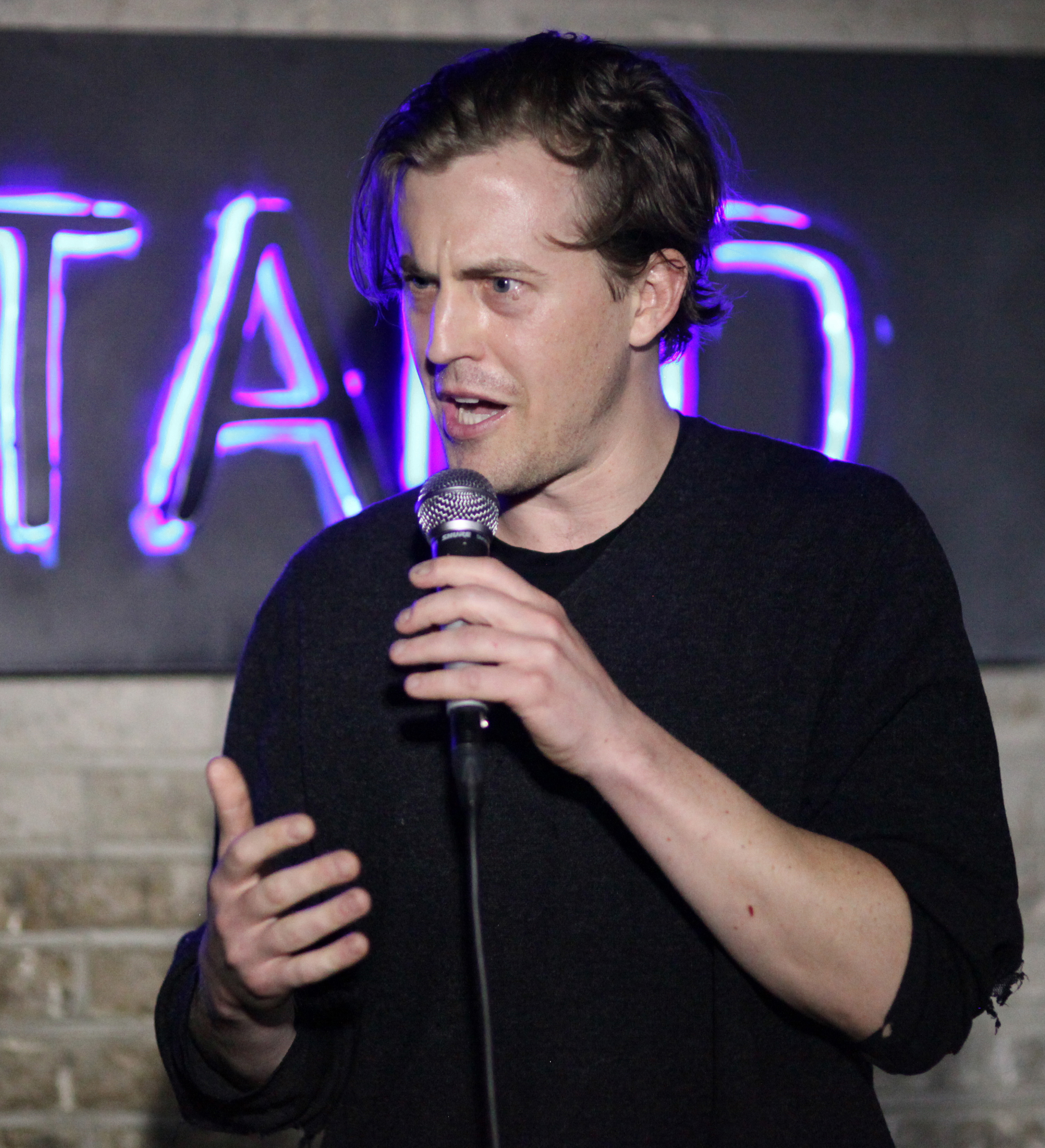
Saturday Night Live cast member Alex Moffat (2000)

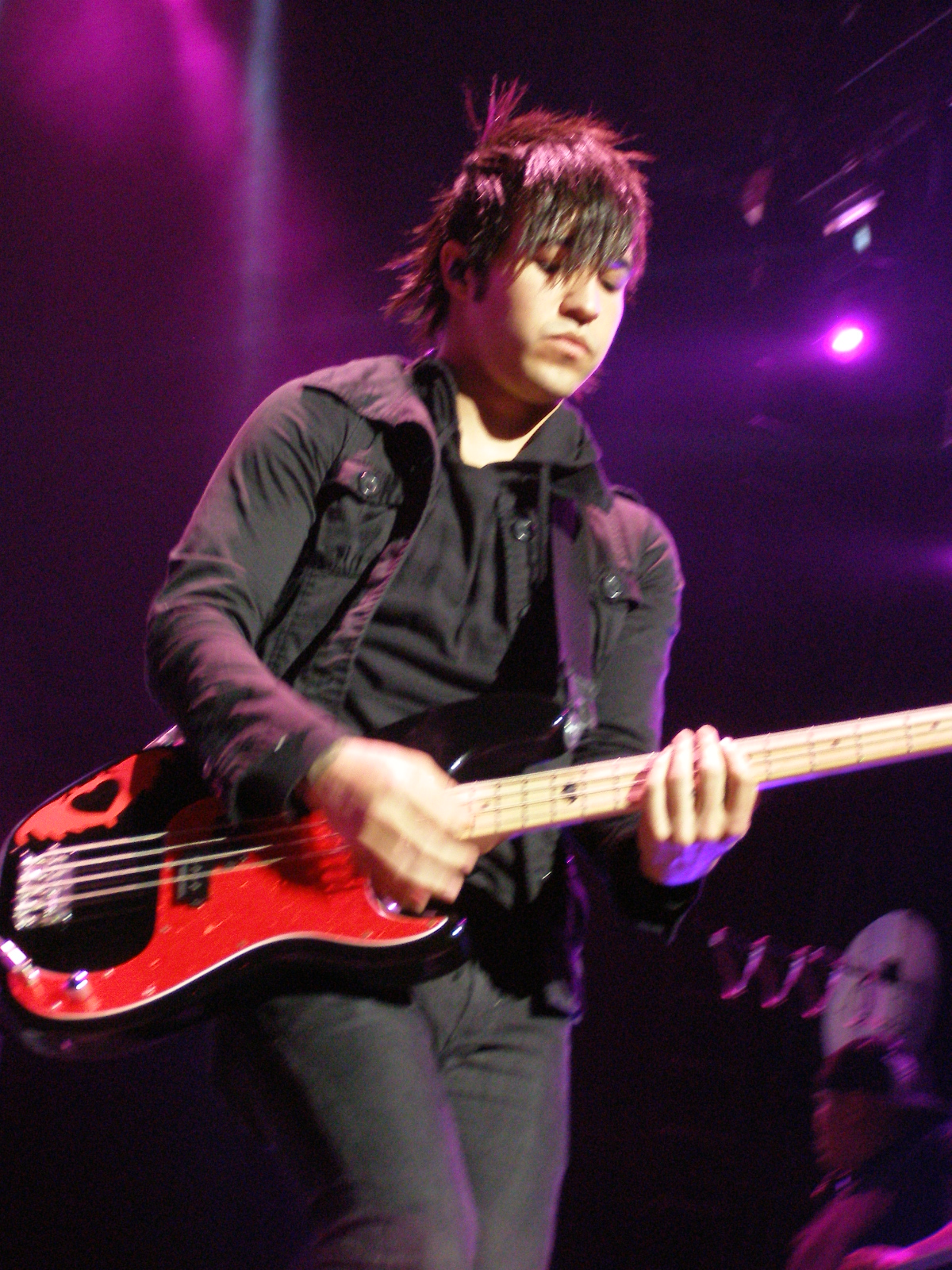
Fall Out Boy bassist, lyricist, and backup vocalist Pete Wentz (1997)

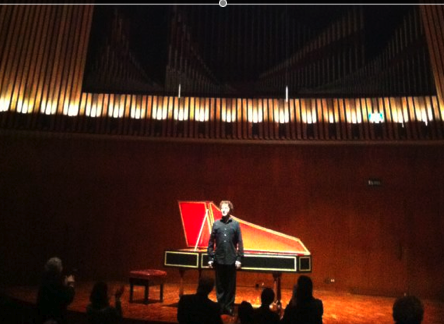
Grammy-nominated harpsichordist Jory Vinikour (1981)

President and Publisher of Harper's Magazine John R. MacArthur (1974)
