= Charles H. Stewart =

American merchant, banker and politician (1867–1936)

Charles Hutchins Stewart

3rd and 11th Mayor of Melbourne, Florida
- In office December 2, 1890 – December 14, 1891
- Preceded by: R.W. Andrews
- Succeeded by: L.P. Ely
- In office December 3, 1902 – December 5, 1905
- Preceded by: W.B. Haimlin
- Succeeded by: Richard W. Goode

Personal details
- Born: September 22, 1867 Joliet, Illinois, US
- Died: June 18, 1936 (aged 68) Melbourne, Florida, US
- Resting place: Pinewood Cemetery, Daytona Beach, Florida, US
- Party: Republican
- Spouse: Annie Mabel Nash (m. May 24, 1888, Titusville, Florida)
- Children: 3
- Education: Wilbraham Seminary, Northwestern University
- Occupation: pharmacist, hardware merchant, banker

Charles Hutchins Stewart (September 22, 1867 – June 18, 1936) was a four-term mayor of Melbourne, Florida from 1890 to 1891, and 1902 to 1905.

== Early life and family ==
He was born in Joliet, Illinois on September 22, 1867, the son of William F. Stewart (b. Ohio) and Julia Ann Hutchins (b. Maysville, Kentucky).

He married Annie Mabel Nash in Titusville on May 24, 1888. She was the daughter of Clarence and Annie Hyatt Nash, a wealthy family from Norwalk, Connecticut with a home in Daytona.

He and his wife Annie Mabel Nash Stewart came to Melbourne in 1888. They were well educated and cultured, but wanted to be pioneers.

== Career ==
He was elected mayor in 1890 when he was only 23.

He opened a hardware store and mortuary on New Haven Ave named Fee & Stewart Hardware Co. and Fee Mortuary Company with his partner, Frank Fee, who would also serve as mayor. The business expanded to include farm supplies, furniture, a bank and an undertaking parlor. In those days, banking was a natural extension of the hardware business, because they very often had to extend credit to their customers. Fee and Stewart founded the Melbourne State Bank on April 3, 1893. At that time, it the nearest bank was in St. Augustine. The bank closed during the Depression.

In 1902, Fee sold his interests in Melbourne to Stewart and moved to Fort Pierce where he reopened the bank, renaming it the Bank of Fort Pierce.

In 1908, he was a presidential elector for the Republican Party.

Documentation exists from as early as 1898 in the form of letters and invoices, books and newspaper articles reflecting his business was already located at 1002 E New Haven Ave, Melbourne, FL.

In 1919, Stewart's Front Street store burned down, along with most of the downtown businesses in "The Great Fire." After this time, the downtown was no longer in that area, but moved to the west side of U.S. 1. Stewart moved his business to New Haven Avenue. He may have moved his business to 1002 E New Haven Ave before the fire of 1919.

In 1920, he was a co-founder of the Melbourne Golf and Country Club.

== Death ==
He died in Melbourne, Florida, on June 18, 1936. He was buried in Daytona Beach, Florida.

Preceded by R.W. Andrews	Mayor of Melbourne, Florida; 1890–1891	Succeeded by L.P. Ely
Preceded by W.B. Haimlin	Mayor of Melbourne, Florida; 1902–1905	Succeeded by Richard W. Goode
