= Jereme Richmond =

American basketball player (born 1992)

Obras Sanitarias
- Position: Shooting guard / small forward
- League: LNB

Personal information
- Born: March 13, 1992 (age 34) Evanston, Illinois
- Listed height: 6 ft 8 in (2.03 m)
- Listed weight: 205 lb (93 kg)

Career information
- High school: North Shore Country Day (Winnetka); Waukegan (Waukegan)
- College: Illinois (2010–2011)
- NBA draft: 2011: undrafted
- Playing career: 2012–present

Career history
- 2012–2013: Sauk Valley Predators
- 2016: CDP Domingo Paulino Santiago
- 2017: plaza valerio
- 2018–present: Obras Sanitarias

Career highlights
- Third-team Parade All-American (2010); McDonald's All-American (2010); Illinois Mr. Basketball (2010)
Medals
Men's basketball
Representing United States
FIBA Americas U18 Championship
Gold medal – first place	2010 San Antonio	Team

Jereme Richmond (born March 13, 1992) is an American professional basketball player for Obras Sanitarias of the Liga Nacional de Básquet. Richmond was considered a top 25 recruit and #4 at his position in the 2010 class. He played college basketball for the University of Illinois. In November 2013, Richmond was sentenced to serve three years in prison. Earlier in 2013 he was convicted of harassment of a witness for making threatening comments and gestures to a probation officer.

== High school career ==
As a freshman, Richmond attended North Shore Country Day School of Winnetka, Illinois. Richmond received notoriety for a verbal commitment to then Illini coach Bruce Weber before his first high school game. Following a transfer in his sophomore year, he excelled as the starting small forward for the Waukegan High Bulldogs basketball team of Waukegan, Illinois. As a junior, he led Waukegan to a runner-up finish in the 2009 IHSA Class 4A State Tournament. Richmond averaged 20.1 points, 9.7 rebounds, 3.6 assists and 2.3 blocks as a junior. As a senior Richmond led the Bulldogs to a third-place finish in IHSA 4A State Tournament. Richmond averaged 21 points, 11.5 rebounds, three assists, and three blocks as a senior.

=== Accolades ===
In his senior year, Richmond was named to the 2010 McDonald's All-American Boys Game roster. Richmond was also named the 2010 Illinois Mr. Basketball. Richmond received the Chicago Sun Times Player of the Year award two years in a row. Quinn Buckner, is the only other player to receive this distinction. Richmond was also a two-time consensus first-team All-State selection as a junior and senior by the Associated Press, Chicago Tribune, Chicago Sun-Times, Champaign-Urbana News-Gazette and Illinois Basketball Coaches Association. Following his senior year, Richmond was a member of the USA Basketball U18 National Team that won a gold medal at the FIBA Americas Championship in June 2010.

=== Recruitment ===
According to ESPNU, Richmond was the twenty-third best overall high school recruit for the class of 2010 as well as the fourth best small forward. According to Rivals.com, Richmond was the thirty-fifth best overall recruit.

== College career ==
During the 2010-11 season, Richmond played 22.1 minutes per game appearing in all regular season games except one. During the season, Richmond averaged 7.6 points per game, 1.8 assists per game and 5.0 rebounds per game.

== Professional career ==
Richmond declared for the 2011 NBA draft on April 5, 2011, but went undrafted. On February 22, 2012 Richmond agreed to play with the Sauk Valley Predators of the Premier Basketball League. Jereme's brother, Justin Richmond, plays in the same league.

On November 2, 2015, after being released from prison, Richmond was acquired by the Delaware 87ers after a successful tryout. However, he was waived on November 11. On December 31, he was reacquired by Delaware and waived on January 16. On February 11, 2016 Richmond signed with CDP Domingo Paulino Santiago of the Dominican Republic.

On January 22, 2018, Richmond signed with Obras Sanitarias of Argentina for the rest of the 2017–18 LNB season.

== Legal trouble ==
On August 9, 2011 Richmond was charged with aggravated battery, aggravated assault, disorderly conduct, illegal possession of a firearm, and unlawful use of a handgun after he allegedly beat his seventeen-year-old girlfriend and threatened to shoot her. On October 5, Richmond tested positive for marijuana after a random drug test while on bond. When the Lake County court learned of this, he was taken to jail on October 21. He was due to return to court on November 7. On December 22, Richmond was placed on court-ordered home detention, meaning that it is mandatory that he be home between 6 p.m. and 6 a.m. as a bond condition. On January 23, 2012, Richmond was sentenced to 18 months' probation, ordered to pay a $500 fine and court costs, and completion of 200 hours of community service, after pleading guilty to unlawful use of a weapon. The other charges were dropped as part of a plea agreement. On October 25, 2012, Richmond was returned to jail after violating several conditions of his probation. On April 26, 2013, Richmond was again taken into custody based on new felony charges of witness harassment and disorderly conduct in connection with an incident involving his probation officer. On August 8, Richmond was found guilty on two of three counts of harassment of a witness, and faced up to seven years in federal prison. On November 25, 2013, Richmond was sentenced to three years in prison. On October 20, 2014, he was released from prison.

Awards and achievements
Preceded by Brandon Paul	Illinois Mr. Basketball Award Winner; 2010	Succeeded by Ryan Boatright; Chasson Randle
