= Charles Stewart III =

American political scientist

Charles Stewart III is an American political scientist, currently the Kenan Sahin Distinguished Professor of political science at Massachusetts Institute of Technology and a Fellow of the American Academy of Arts and Sciences.
