= Charlie Stewart (footballer, born 1880) =

Australian rules footballer

Personal information
- Full name: Charles Leslie Stewart
- Born: 12 July 1880; St Kilda, Victoria
- Died: 21 August 1957 (aged 77); St Kilda, Victoria
- Original team: Essendon District
- Height: 164 cm (5 ft 5 in)
- Weight: 60 kg (132 lb)
- Position: Full-forward

Playing career^{1}
Years	Club	Games (Goals)
1901	Carlton	3 (1)
- ^{1} Playing statistics correct to the end of 1901.

Charles Leslie Stewart MM (12 July 1880 – 21 August 1957) was an Australian rules football player and World War I veteran.

== Football career ==
Stewart played three matches for Carlton during the 1901 VFL season. He had come to Carlton from Essendon District.

== War service ==
Stewart was a veteran of both Gallipoli and the Western Front. Rising to the rank of acting sergeant, he was awarded the Military Medal for bravery in March 1918.
