= Charles Stewart (British Army officer) =

British Army officer

Lieutenant-Colonel Charles Stewart (1775–1812) was a British Army officer who fought and died in the Napoleonic wars. He was commissioned as a lieutenant in 71st Highlanders in 1791. He was wounded at the Siege of Seringapatam (1792). He was prompted to lieutenant-colonel of the 50th Foot in 1805. He commanded first battalion on the Walcheren expedition (1809), and also in the Peninsula from 1811 to 1812. He died on campaign at Coria.

== Biography ==
Charles Stewart, born in 1775, was the eldest son of Thomas Stewart of Drumin, Banffshire, a lieutenant in the 56th foot, and Anne (née Gordon). After serving for a short time in the Duke of Gordon's Fencibles, he was commissioned as lieutenant in the 71st (Highland) Regiment of Foot on 25 January 1791. He joined the regiment in India, and was wounded in the attack on Tippoo Sahib's camp at Seringapatam on 6–7 February 1792. He was with the light company, and was noticed by Lord Cornwallis. On 3 April 1794 he obtained a company in the 109th Foot, and, when that regiment was reduced in the following year, he was transferred with the men to the 53rd Foot on 2 September 1795.

Stewart served several years in the West Indies, and was wounded in storming the Morne Fortuné on St. Lucia in May 1796. He was promoted major in the regiment on 4 April 1800, and came home in command of it about 1804. On 17 February 1805 he was made lieutenant-colonel of the newly raised 2nd battalion of the 50th Foot. Sir Charles James Napier, who was major under him, wrote of him at the time as very pleasant in command and very decided, and afterwards spoke of him as one of the best officers of his rank in the service.

Having been transferred to the 1st battalion, Stewart served with it in the Walcheren expedition, was left in command of the rear-guard when the army withdrew, and was mentioned in despatches. In September 1810 he went to the Peninsula with the 1st battalion, and commanded it throughout the campaigns of 1811–12. It was engaged at Fuentes de Oñoro, and was soon afterwards attached to Hill's corps, and took part in the actions of Arroyo de Molinos, battle of Almaraz, and Alba de Tormes. In the storming of Fort Napoleon at Almaraz, Stewart led the right wing of his regiment "in a most gallant and spirited manner". The hardships of the retreat to Portugal in the autumn of 1812 broke down his health, and he died at Coria on 11 December, and was buried with military honours in the campo santo (cemetery). He was unmarried.
