= Frederic Poole Gorham =

American bacteriologist (1871–1933)

- Born: April 29, 1871; Providence, Rhode Island, US
- Died: June 4, 1933 (aged 62); Glocester, Rhode Island, US
- Resting place: Swan Point Cemetery
- Education: Brown University (A.M.)
- Occupations: Bacteriologist, educator
- Spouse(s): Emma May Lapham (1897−1913); Ruth Elizabeth Bjorkchahl (1917−1933)
- Children: 5

Frederic Poole Gorham (April 29, 1871 – June 4, 1933) was an American bacteriologist and educator.

== Biography ==
Born on April 29, 1871, in Providence, Rhode Island, to Samuel Gorham and Abby Harding Fish, he was educated in local schools before graduating from Providence High School in 1889 and matriculating to Brown University. After graduating in 1893, he became an instructor of Biology at Brown and was awarded his A.M. in 1894 upon examination, with special studies performed at Harvard. On June 24, 1897, he was married to Emma Mary Lapham in Burrillville, Rhode Island. Thereafter he became an assistant professor in 1899, then associate professor in 1901. While doing so, he attended a series of lectures at Harvard University during 1902−1903. In 1913 he established bacteriology as a field of study at Brown University, becoming Professor of Bacteriology.

In 1899, he was appointed bacteriologist for the Providence Department of Health, a post he occupied until 1933—primarily in an advisory capacity. He became secretary of the Board of Trustees of the Rhode Island State Tuberculosis Sanatorium in 1908. After helping to found the Society of American Bacteriologists, in 1911 he was named president of the organization. Two years later he became a bacteriologist for the Rhode Island Shellfish Commission, and in 1914 the deputy milk inspector for Providence. His first wife being deceased in 1913, he married Ruth Elizabeth Bjorkchahl on January 1, 1917—they had one daughter, named Ruth. He served as chairman of the Laboratory Section for the American Public Health Association, and during 1925–1931 he served with the city park commission. In 1933, he was awarded an honorary Doctor of Science degree from Brown University, but died of a heart attack before he could receive it.

== Bibliography ==
- A laboratory guide for the dissection of the cat: an introduction to the study of anatomy (1895) with R. W. Tower
- A laboratory course in bacteriology: for the use of medical, agricultural, and industrial students (1897)
- The gas-bubble disease of fish and its cause (1900)
- Morphological varieties of bacillus diphtheriæ (1901)
- The photogenic bacteria (1903)
- Recent debts to biology (1904)
- Cambrian deposits of North Attelboro (1905)
- Superior Rhode Island oysters (1913)
