= Charles Stuart (rugby union, born 1886) =

Irish rugby union player

- Full name: Charles Parnell Stuart
- Born: 2 April 1886
- Died: 21 November 1958 (aged 72)

Rugby union career
- Position: Fullback
International career
Years	Team	Apps	(Points)
1912	Ireland	1	(0)

Charles Parnell Stuart (2 April 1886 – 21 November 1958) was an Irish international rugby union player.

Stuart was a fullback, known for his long touch finding kicks, and sound tackling abilities.

In 1912, Stuart became the first Clontarf player to gain an Ireland cap, appearing against the Springboks at Lansdowne Road. He was largely ineffective in a 0–38 Ireland loss and received no further international opportunities.

== See also ==
- List of Ireland national rugby union players
