= Charles Stewart (actor) =

American actor (1923–2016)

- Stewart in Star Trek: The Original Series, 1966
- Born: Charles Joseph Stewart; April 16, 1923; New York, U.S.
- Died: October 17, 2016 (aged 93)
- Occupation: Actor
- Years active: 1953–1998

Charles Joseph Stewart (April 16, 1923 – October 17, 2016) was an American film and television actor. He has appeared on the television series such as Star Trek: The Original Series, Batman, Bewitched, The F.B.I., and The Brady Bunch, as well as films such as The War of the Worlds (1953), The Lineup (1958), The Hollywood Knights (1980) and Armageddon (1998).

== Biography ==
Charles Stewart was born on April 16, 1923. He was an actor, and appeared on television series such as Star Trek: The Original Series, Batman, Bewitched, The F.B.I., and The Brady Bunch, as well as films such as The War of the Worlds (1953), The Lineup (1958), The Hollywood Knights (1980), and Armageddon (1998).

Stewart died on October 17, 2016, at the age of 93.

== Filmography ==
=== Film ===
Year	Title	Role	Notes
1953	The War of the Worlds	Marine captain	Uncredited
1958	The Lineup	Laboratory technician	Uncredited
1958	War of the Colossal Beast	Captain Harris	
1961	Picture Window	Joe Saxon	Television play
1966	The Glass Bottom Boat	Reporter	Uncredited
1969	The Arrangement	Board member	Uncredited
1980	The Hollywood Knights	Homeowner	
1981	The Miracle of Kathy Miller	Ray McMillan	
1982	Mountain Charlie		
1983	Grace Kelly	Toastmaker	
1987	The Last Innocent Man	Lawyer's aide	
1994	Gunmen	Knife grinder	
1998	Armageddon	Vacuum chamber technician	

=== Television ===
Year	Title	Role	Notes
1958	Adventures of Wild Bill Hickok	Captain Dan Bodie	Episode: "The Good Indian" (no. 112)
1959	Naked City	Petersen	Episode: "Ticker Tape" (no. 22); uncredited
1960	Men into Space		Episode: "Voice of Infinity" (no. 28)
1964	The Fugitive	Reporter #1	Episode: "Man in a Chariot" (no. 31)
1965	My Favorite Martian	Patrolman	Episode: "Lorelei Brown vs. Everybody" (no. 89)
1966	Star Trek: The Original Series	Captain Ramart	Episode: "Charlie X" (no. 2)
1966	Batman	Clergyman	2 episodes
1966	The F.B.I.	Marcus	Episode: "Quantico" (no. 20)
1968	The F.B.I.	Reporter	Episode: "The Predators" (no. 86)
1969	The F.B.I.	Noel Phillips	Episode: "The Challenge"
1967	Bewitched	Producer	Episode: "Ho Ho the Clown" (no. 92)
1968	The Invaders	Robertson	Episode: "Counter-Attack" (no. 35)
1974	The Brady Bunch	Joe Sinclair	Episode: "The Hustler" (no. 116)
1975	The Invisible Man	Man	Episode: "Barnard Wants Out" (no. 5)
1977	Switch	Jake Odden	Episode: "Camera Angles" (no. 41)
1977	Little Vic	Mr. Lawson	
1982	Joanie Loves Chachi	Poobah	Episode: "No Nudes Is Good Nudes" (no. 8)
