= Garrett Muscatel =

American politician

Member of the New Hampshire House of Representatives from the Grafton 12th district
- In office December 5, 2018 – June 8, 2020

Personal details
- Born: December 7, 1997 (age 28) Thousand Oaks, California, U.S.
- Party: Democratic
- Education: Dartmouth College; Stanford University

Garrett Muscatel (born December 7, 1997) is a former Democratic member of the New Hampshire House of Representatives, representing Grafton County District 12, Hanover and Lyme, from December 5, 2018, to June 8, 2020. Muscatel resigned in June 2020 after his claims of being a New Hampshire resident were challenged by the New Hampshire Republican State Committee.

== Early life and education ==
At the time of his election to the legislature, he was a government and economics student at Dartmouth College, where he served as vice president of the Dartmouth Democrats. Muscatel first became interested in politics when he attended Barack Obama's presidential inauguration on January 20, 2009. At age 21, he was the youngest openly LGBTQ legislator serving in the entire United States. He received his JD from Stanford Law School as a Knight-Hennessy Scholar. He has two siblings, Evan Muscatel and Quinn Muscatel.

== Political engagement ==
Muscatel is one of the plaintiffs in a lawsuit led by the New Hampshire Democratic Party and the League of Women Voters against a new state requirement that imposes residency requirements for voting, SB3.

On November 6, 2018, Muscatel won a seat in the New Hampshire House of Representatives. His constituency included Dartmouth College and the surrounding areas, including Hanover and Lyme.
