= John Macy =

American civil servant (1917–1986)

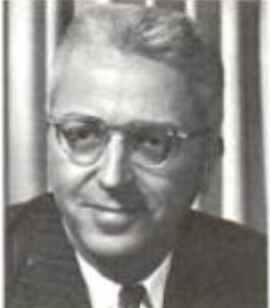

Director of the Federal Emergency Management Agency
- In office August 1979 – January 20, 1981
- President: Jimmy Carter
- Preceded by: Thomas Casey (acting)
- Succeeded by: Bernard Gallagher (acting)

Personal details
- Born: John Williams Macy Jr. April 6, 1917 Chicago, Illinois, U.S.
- Died: December 22, 1986 (aged 69) McLean, Virginia, U.S.
- Party: Democratic
- Education: Wesleyan University (BA); American University (attended)

John Williams Macy Jr. (April 6, 1917 – December 22, 1986) was a United States government administrator and civil servant.

== Biography ==
Born in Chicago, he received a B.A. from Wesleyan University in 1938. In 1938, Macy moved to Washington, D.C., where he began his government service and studied at American University. He worked as an intern at the National Institute of Public Affairs from 1938–1939 and later became an administrative aide of the Social Security Board (1939–1940).

From 1940 to 1942, he was a personnel specialist for the War Department in Washington and Chicago. From 1942 to 1943 he became the assistant director of civilian personnel. He enlisted during World War II, served in the U.S. Army from 1943 to 1946, and attained the rank of captain fighting in the China theater. In 1944, he married Joyce Hagen. After the war, he returned to the War Department as director of civilian personnel.

From 1947 to 1951, Macy was the organization and personnel director for the U.S. Atomic Energy Commission in Los Alamos, New Mexico. From 1951 to 1953, Macy was the special assistant to the Under Secretary of the Army.

In 1953, he was appointed by President Dwight D. Eisenhower as President of the United States Civil Service Commission (CSC). He held this post until 1958. He left government service in 1958 to act as the executive vice-president of his alma mater, Wesleyan University.

President John F. Kennedy asked Macy to return to the Civil Service Commission in 1961, and Macy chaired the commission through Kennedy and Johnson Administrations. He called for federal salaries to be put on par with private industry salaries. It was during this time that the CSC persecuted gay men (as part of the Lavender Scare), and had at least three lawsuits filed against it, see Anonymous v Macy, Scott v Macy, Norton v Macy. During the Johnson Administration, Macy also directed the White House Personnel Appointment Office. Lyndon Johnson awarded Macy the presidential medal of freedom in 1969 “John Macy recruited more talent of proven ability into government service than any other man of our time. In demanding only the best and in seeking it out, he set a standard of excellence that will serve as a benchmark for many years to come. Our government is stronger today from top to bottom because of his efforts. The government is fairer too because John Macy insisted that equal employment opportunity meant what it says. He insisted that on ability and character without regard to religion or race or color or section.”

Macy left the CSC in 1969 and served as president for the Corporation for Public Broadcasting (1969–1972). His work landed him on the master list of Nixon political opponents.

In 1979, President Jimmy Carter nominated Macy to become the first Senate-confirmed director of the Federal Emergency Management Agency. He served in that position until 1981.

Macy also authored several books, including Public Service: Human Side of Government (1971) and To Irrigate a Wasteland (1974).

A civil servant with a career spanning six different decades, John Macy died in McLean, Virginia.

In 1988, the U.S. Army established the John W. Macy, Jr., Award that recognizes demonstrated excellence in the leadership of civilians by an Army military or civilian supervisor. The first awardee was John T. Lovo, Director of Engineering and Housing for the US Army in Munich, Germany.

Government offices
Preceded by Thomas Casey; Acting	Director of the Federal Emergency Management Agency; 1979–1981	Succeeded by Bernard Gallagher; Acting
