= Anne B. Young =

American neuroscientist

Anne Buckingham Young
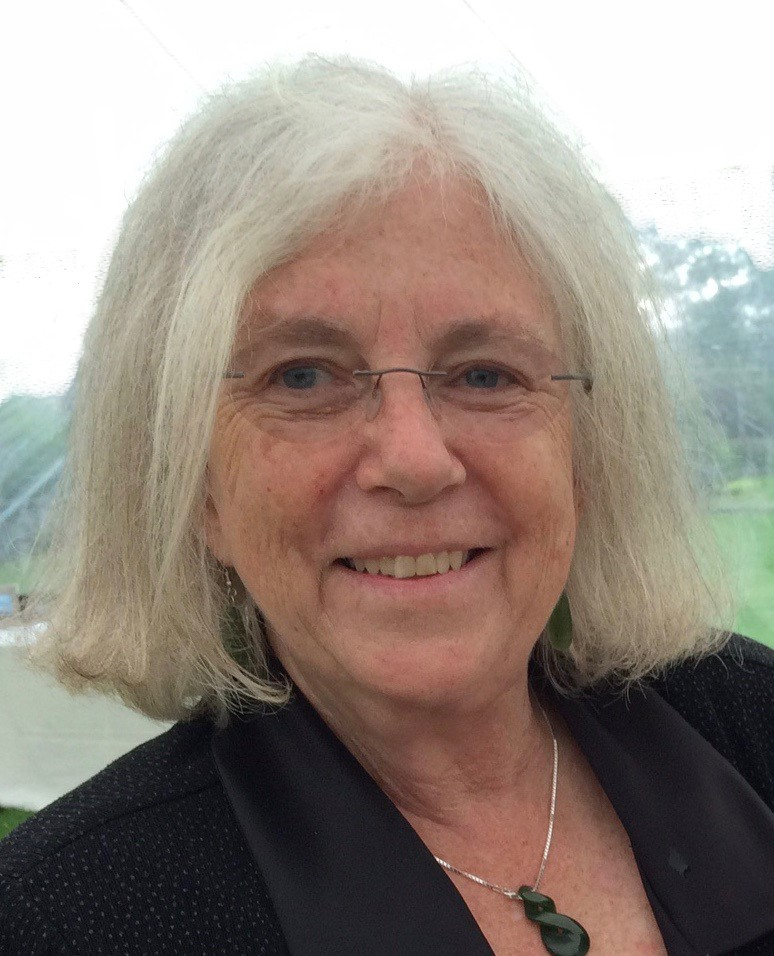
- Born: Evanston, Illinois
- Education: Vassar College, Johns Hopkins University School of Medicine
- Known for: Neurodegenerative diseases, Huntington's disease, Glutamate
- Spouses: John B. Penney, Jr. (1971–1999), Stetson Ames (2005–present)
- Scientific career
- Fields: Neuroscience
- Workplaces: University of Michigan, Harvard Medical School, Massachusetts General Hospital
- Doctoral advisor: Solomon H. Snyder

Anne Buckingham Young is an American physician and neuroscientist who has made major contributions to the study of neurodegenerative diseases, with a focus on movement disorders like Huntington's disease and Parkinson's disease. Young completed her undergraduate studies at Vassar College and earned a dual MD/PhD from Johns Hopkins Medical School. She has held faculty positions at University of Michigan and Harvard University. She became the first female chief of service at Massachusetts General Hospital when she was appointed Chief of Neurology in 1991. She retired from this role and from clinical service in 2012. She is a member of many academic societies and has won numerous awards. Young is also the only person to have been president of both the international Society for Neuroscience and the American Neurological Association.

== Early and personal life ==
Young grew up in Winnetka, a suburb located on the North Shore of Chicago. Growing up, her feisty nature earned her the nickname of "Tiger Annie" among friends and family. As a result, she was sent to prep school to keep her out of trouble. Both of Young's parents were involved in science; her father studied chemistry at Harvard, and her mother studied physics at Vassar College.

After receiving her undergraduate degree from Vassar College, Young enrolled in an MD/PhD Program at Johns Hopkins Medical School. There, she met her first husband, John (Jack) B. Penney Jr. Throughout their marriage, they collaborated professionally and together had two daughters, Jessica and Ellen. Penney died suddenly in 1999. Young is currently married to her high school boyfriend Stetson Ames.

Throughout her life, Young has had trouble reading due to dyslexia. After Penney's death, Young also struggled with depression and was diagnosed with bipolar disorder for which she receives therapy. She continued to run the department of neurology at Massachusetts General Hospital.

== Professional career ==
=== Overview ===
Young's research career includes many highlights. In 1974 she published a paper contributing to the discovery of glutamate as a neurotransmitter. Additionally, a 1989 paper she co-authored describing an anatomically and pharmacologically derived model of basal ganglia disorders has been cited over 5000 times. As part of the Huntington Study Group, Young has published multiple reviews about the progress of research on Huntington's Disease. Additionally, she participated in an assessment of the Unified Huntington's Disease Rating Scale, which has been cited over 1000 times.

She received a BA in chemistry from Vassar College. Young was then awarded both an M.D. and Ph.D. in Pharmacology from Johns Hopkins within 5 years. Her dissertation work was in a neuropharmacology lab focused on psychiatric disorders. Their group helped to define the role of neurotransmitters in different cell types. She completed residency training in neurology at the University of California San Francisco. With her late husband John B. Penney Jr., Young started a laboratory at the University of Michigan studying the anatomy and pharmacology of the basal ganglia. In 1991, Young was appointed chief of neurology at Massachusetts General Hospital and the Julianne Dorn Professor of Neurology at Harvard Medical School. She was the first female service chief in the hospital's 180-year history. She and Penney developed the Mass General Institute for Neurodegenerative Disease, a collaborative location to streamline the process of research and clinical treatment development. Throughout her career, Young participated in the Venezuela Huntington's Disease Project with Nancy Wexler. Young was the president of the Society for Neuroscience from 2003 to 2004 and of the American Neurological Association from 2002 to 2004.

=== Vassar College - undergraduate studies ===
Young completed her undergraduate studies summa cum laude at Vassar College, with a major in chemistry and minors in art history and philosophy. She worked in a laboratory there, developing an interest in biochemistry under her professor, Anne Gounaris. Together, they analyzed pyruvate decarboxylase, an enzyme involved in metabolism. An assay technique developed by Young is published in a paper in the Journal of Biological Chemistry.

=== Johns Hopkins Medical School ===
After graduating from Vassar, Young enrolled in Johns Hopkins Medical School. Young was one of nine women in her class of 110. In an autobiography, Young describes how her lectures had mostly male professors and students. They would show nude photos of women for entertainment. She once switched one of the photos with a nude picture of a man to embarrass the lecturer. Young also met her husband Jack during her first year, and they continued their relationship while both pursuing careers in neurology.

Young spent only two and a half years completing her required medical school courses and clerkships. During the PhD portion of her graduate studies, Young worked with Professor Solomon Snyder on preliminary analyses of potential neurotransmitters, such as glutamate, glycine, and GABA. Data provided by Young was the first suggestion that glutamate was a neurotransmitter of cerebellar granule cells. Young also worked with glycine and GABA receptors and found a way to detect inhibitory amino acid receptors using neurotoxins. Young developed several collaborative projects with others in the neurology department at Johns Hopkins. She graduated with her MD in 1973 and her PhD in pharmacology in 1974 with ten publications under her belt.

=== UCSF - internship and residency ===
Young applied for internship and residency programs at University of California, San Francisco (UCSF). She was accepted to the UCSF residency program and matched with an internship at nearby Mt. Zion Hospital in 1974. Young completed her residency a year behind her husband, Jack, and became pregnant during her second year. In her third year, she was chosen as chief resident. After completing their residencies, the couple found jobs at the University of Michigan and began in 1978.

=== University of Michigan ===
Mentored by the head of neurology, Sid Gilman, Young began to write grants and to work on positron emission tomography studies of Huntington's Disease. Young wrote her first grant during residency and decided to focus on spinal cord spasticity. Her grant received funding from the National Institute of Neurological Disorders and Stroke. Later that year, Young gave birth to her second daughter.

Young and her husband partnered in all of their research and clinical work. They established the U of M Movement Disorders Clinic. The couple took on specific roles. Young was the expert in pharmacology, neurotransmitters, and receptors. In the clinic, she focused on hyperkinetic disorders like Huntington's and Tourette's syndrome. Penney was the expert in stereotactic surgery, anatomy, computer programs, and statistics. In the clinic, he focused on hypokinetic movement disorders like Parkinson's. The couple pioneered research on the basal ganglia's involvement in these movement disorders. Their research identified a pathway in the cortex that acts on striatal cells (circuits through the cortex/striatum/pallium/subthalamic nucleus/substantia nigra/thalamus and back to the cortex.) This circuit was predicted to be defective in both Huntington's and Parkinson's patients. They published their theory in 1986 in Movement Disorders and continued to investigate the problem with Dr. Roger L. Albin. The evidence and the hypothesis from their publication led to the development of deep brain stimulation, a treatment for Parkinson's Disease. In 1989, they published their work proposing a new model of the basal ganglia's involvement in Huntington's and Parkinson's in Trends in Neuroscience. Albin now occupies a faculty position at University of Michigan which is named in her honor: the Anne B. Young Collegiate Professor of Neurology.

=== Venezuela Huntington's disease project ===
In 1981, Young traveled with Nancy Wexler to Lake Maracaibo to study a family of many members with or at risk of Huntington's disease. She and her husband returned yearly with Wexler to examine members of the family, to take DNA samples, and to develop a detailed pedigree. For 22 years, the team continued to travel to Venezuela until international relations with Hugo Chávez halted the project. Their work in Venezuela contributed to Jim Gusella's discovery of the location of the gene that causes Huntington's disease. Ten years later, a collaborative group isolated the gene and the mutation which causes Huntington's. This discovery led to the development of genetic testing for at-risk individuals, allowing them and clinical researchers to know whether they would develop Huntington's disease.

=== Massachusetts General Hospital ===
In 1991, Young was recruited and appointed to chief of neurology at Massachusetts General Hospital (MGH). She was the first female chief in the hospital's history and the first female chief of neurology at a teaching hospital in the United States.

==== MassGeneral Institute for Neurodegenerative Diseases (MIND) ====
As chief of neurology, Young recognized the potential benefit of bringing together the existing labs at MGH studying neurodegenerative diseases. She developed a proposal to convert a nearby Navy building into an open lab space for the study of neurodegenerative disease, and she brought this to hospital administrators. Her proposal received funding, and she was given almost an entire building where the Mass General Institute for Neurodegenerative Disease (MIND) was established. MIND seeks to have a broad focus to study not only the cause of these diseases, but also to develop effective therapeutic techniques. Another aspect of MIND Young helped to foster is collaborative teamwork between researchers. MIND has made many contributions to research of neurodegenerative diseases, including a role in the development of several clinically proven therapies.

==== Anne B. Young Translational Medicine Fellowship ====
The Massachusetts General Hospital Department of Neurology partnered with Biogen to offer a fellowship in Young's honor. The fellowship trains fellows to quickly and efficiently perform research and create treatments for neurological disorders. The fellowship is focused on scientists early in their careers to create a combined focus on academia and industry.

=== Harvard Medical School ===
In 1991, Young began as chief of neurology at Mass Gen and professor of neurology at Harvard Medical School. In 2012, she was appointed Distinguished Julieanne Dorn Distinguished Professor of Neurology, where she teaches presently. Her research has been in metabotropic glutamate receptors in neurodegeneration and Alzheimer's disease. In 2004, she mentored a student project about the gene for Huntington's Disease, which codes for the protein huntingtin. Since 2012, she has given up her lab in order to fundraise and let others have access to her prior space and resources.

=== American Neurological Association ===
In 2001, Young was the second female chosen to be president of the American Neurological Association. During Young's tenure, a mentoring program for neurologists and neuroscientists was developed through a partnership with NINDS. This program continues today.

=== Society for Neuroscience ===
In 2003, Young was elected president of the Society for Neuroscience. During Young's tenure, she oversaw the design and development of a new headquarters building for the Society in Washington D.C. The building was designed to be as environmentally friendly as possible. She has also served as chair of the Government and Public Affairs Committee for the Society.

=== Selected publications ===
Over her many years in research, Young has made contributions to the study of neuroscience. She has been credited in over a hundred publications, with a majority of contributions focusing on neurodegenerative diseases. Following is a chronologically organized list of a selection of Young's papers which presented significant findings at that time in the field.

- 1971: Nuclear localization of histamine in neonatal rat brain.

This paper showed that histamine in neonatal brains is concentrated in the nucleus, suggesting a role for histamine in brain development.

- 1974: Glutamic Acid-Selective Depletion by Viral Induced Granule Cell Loss in Hamster Cerebellum

Glutamic Acid

This paper correlated the loss of the excitatory action of granule cells and the selective loss of synaptic glutamic acid, to suggest glutamate as the possible primary neurotransmitter of the granule cell. Today glutamate is considered to be the chief excitatory neurotransmitter in the human central nervous system.

- 1987: Glutamate Dysfunction in Alzheimers Disease- An Hypothesis

After further studies solidified glutamic acid as a critical excitatory neurotransmitter involved in the formation of memory and in learning, Young and her team hypothesized on potential ramifications of dysfunctioning glutamic acid. Their research linked the potential harmful and toxic effects of glutamic acid in Alzheimer's disease.

- 1988: Differential Loss of Striatal Projection Neurons in Huntington Disease

In this paper, Young and her colleagues investigated the degeneration of striatal projection neurons, present in the basal ganglia in the brain. Using immunohistochemistry, the progression of Huntington's Disease was imaged and tracked to identify how the disease reduces the number of neurons in the striatum.

- 1989: The Functional Anatomy of Basal Ganglia Disorders

This paper described a model of basal ganglia disorders, including hyperkinetic and hypokinetic disorders. Through different physical and systems-based research, models of neural networks of Early Stage Huntington's Disease and Parkinson's Disease were proposed. The models suggest that different areas of the striatum, previously established as the area of the brain most directly related to the diseases, may be involved in the different steps and features of motor control. This discovery allowed researchers to pursue research focused on the different areas and types of degradation of the striatum correlated with either Parkinson's or Huntington's disease.

- 1989: Excitatory Amino Acids and Alzheimers Disease

In this paper, Young and her co-author Greenamyre present research on the role of disrupting different excitatory amino acid mechanisms in the hippocampus and cerebral cortex of the brain. They concluded that disrupting these pathways could play a role in both the development of symptoms of Alzheimer's disease, specifically in memory loss, and the pathological symptoms, or physical changes in the brain.

=== Memoir ===
Dr. Young has been writing a memoir about her life and work, starting the process in 2022. She discusses how her husband's sudden death, "left her feeling like she had a bad concussion." She hopes that her story inspires future doctors, and to remind them that things work out despite feeling unpredictable. Dr. Young is a pioneer for women in science and always pushed for more space, more respect, and more recognition.

== Colleagues ==
- John B. Penney Jr.
- Nancy Wexler
- James F. Gusella
- Sid Gilman
- Solomon H. Snyder
- Raymond D. Adams
- Ira Shoulson

== Awards and honors ==
In 1994, Young was chosen as a member of the Institute of Medicine. She was elected to the American Academy of Arts and Sciences in 1995. In 1999, Young was awarded the Dean's Award for Support and Advancement of Women Faculty by Harvard Medical School. Two years later, Young won the Marion Spencer Fay Award, which recognizes excellence in medicine and science through innovation and leadership. In 2005, she was granted fellowship to the Royal College of Physicians, England. In 2006, she received the Milton Wexler Award from the Hereditary Disease Foundation. Young has also been given two distinguished alumni awards, one from Johns Hopkins Medical School and one from Vassar College. She holds a distinguished professor position at Harvard, the Julieanne Dorn Professor of Neurology.
