= Charles Edward Stewart (British Army officer) =

British Army officer (1868–1916)

Brigadier-General Charles Edward Stewart CMG
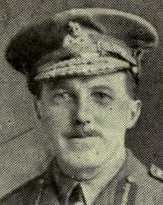
- Born: 27 September 1868; London, England
- Died: 14 September 1916 (aged 47); Houplines, France
- Military career
- Allegiance: United Kingdom
- Branch: British Army
- Service years: 1889–1916
- Rank: Brigadier-General
- Unit: Black Watch
- Commands: 154th Brigade; 1st Battalion Black Watch
- Conflicts: Second Boer War; First World War
- Awards: Companion of the Order of St Michael and St George; Mentioned in Despatches (4)

Brigadier-General Charles Edward Stewart, CMG (27 September 1868 – 14 September 1916) was a British Army officer. He was killed in action in France in 1916, while commanding the 154th Brigade, under the 51st Division.

He became general officer commanding (GOC) of the brigade on 3 January 1916 when he was promoted to the temporary rank of brigadier general while employed in this role.
