= Arthur M. Banta =

American zoologist (1877–1946)

- Born: December 31, 1877; Greenwood, Indiana
- Died: January 2, 1946 (aged 68)
- Education: Central Normal College (BS), Indiana University (BA, MA), Harvard University (PhD)
- Occupations: Zoologist, cave biologist
- Known for: The Fauna of Mayfield's Cave (1907)

Arthur Mangun Banta (December 31, 1877 – January 2, 1946) was an American zoologist and professor known for his studies on cave animals. His 1907 publication The Fauna of Mayfield's Cave, a survey of the fauna of an Indiana cave, has become a "classic account in the annals of cave biology in the United States".

== Biography ==
Banta was born on December 31, 1877, in Greenwood, Indiana, to James Henry and Mary (Magnun) Banta, a family of Dutch descent. He was a close childhood friend of Lewis Terman, who became a noted psychologist. He earned a Bachelor of Science degree from Central Normal College in Danville, Indiana, in 1898, after which he was high school principal in Needham until 1901. He then enrolled at Indiana University, where he earned a Bachelor of Arts degree in 1903 and a Master of Arts degree in 1904 working under Carl Eigenmann. He then entered Harvard University, receiving a Ph.D. in 1907, and was professor of biology at Marietta College from 1907 to 1909. From 1909 to 1930, he was investigator at the Station for Experimental Evolution at Cold Spring Harbor, New York, in which he used an artificial cave beneath the main laboratory to study the genetics and adaptations of cave animals, especially Cladocera (water fleas).

Banta was visiting professor at Brown University from 1929 to 1930, and professor there from 1930 until his retirement in 1945. He was a fellow of the American Association for the Advancement of Science, and a member of the American Society of Zoologists, American Society of Naturalists, Ecological Society of America, American Genetic Association, Society for Experimental Biology and Medicine, and the Limnological Society of America. On July 26, 1906, he married Mary Charlotte Slack. They had three children: James Jerry, Ruth, and Leah Margaret. Banta died on January 2, 1946, aged 68.

== Gallery ==
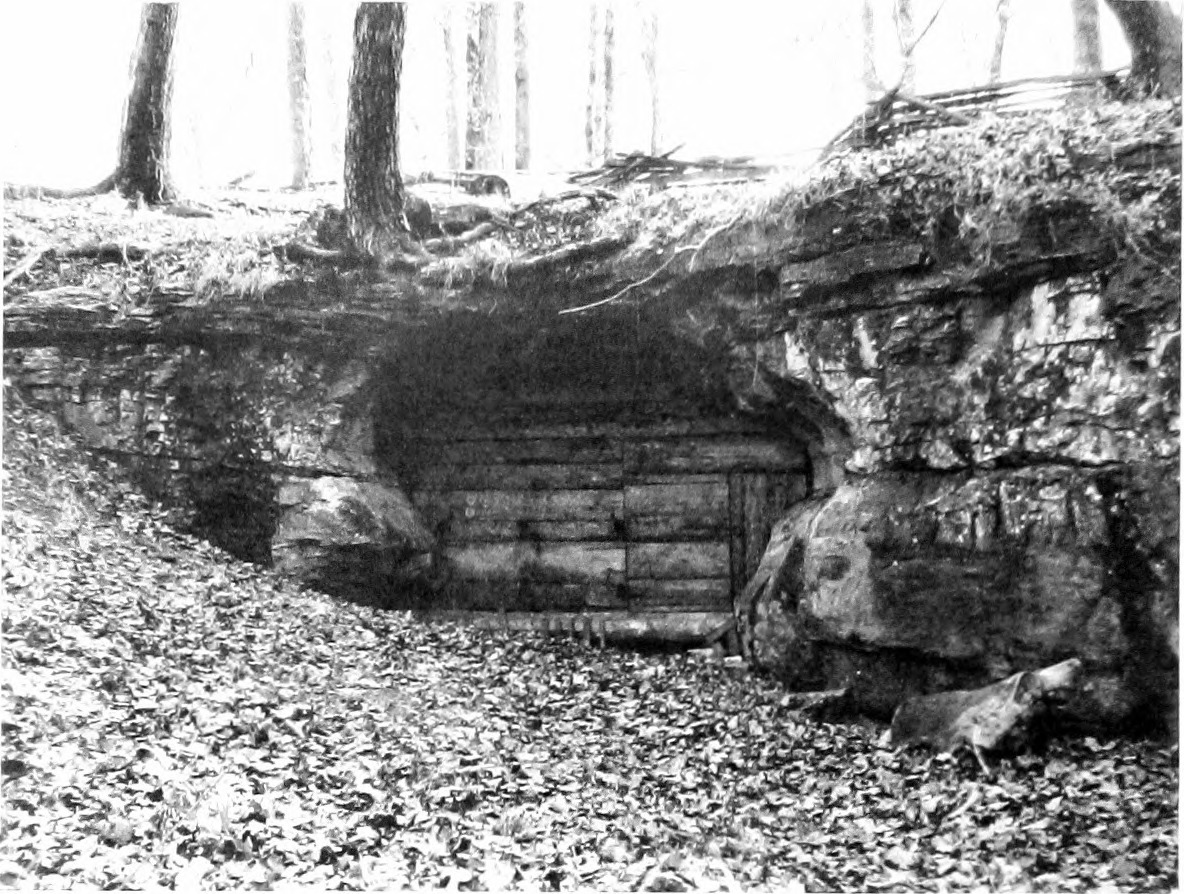
Mouth of Mayfield's Cave in Indiana, by Banta (1907)

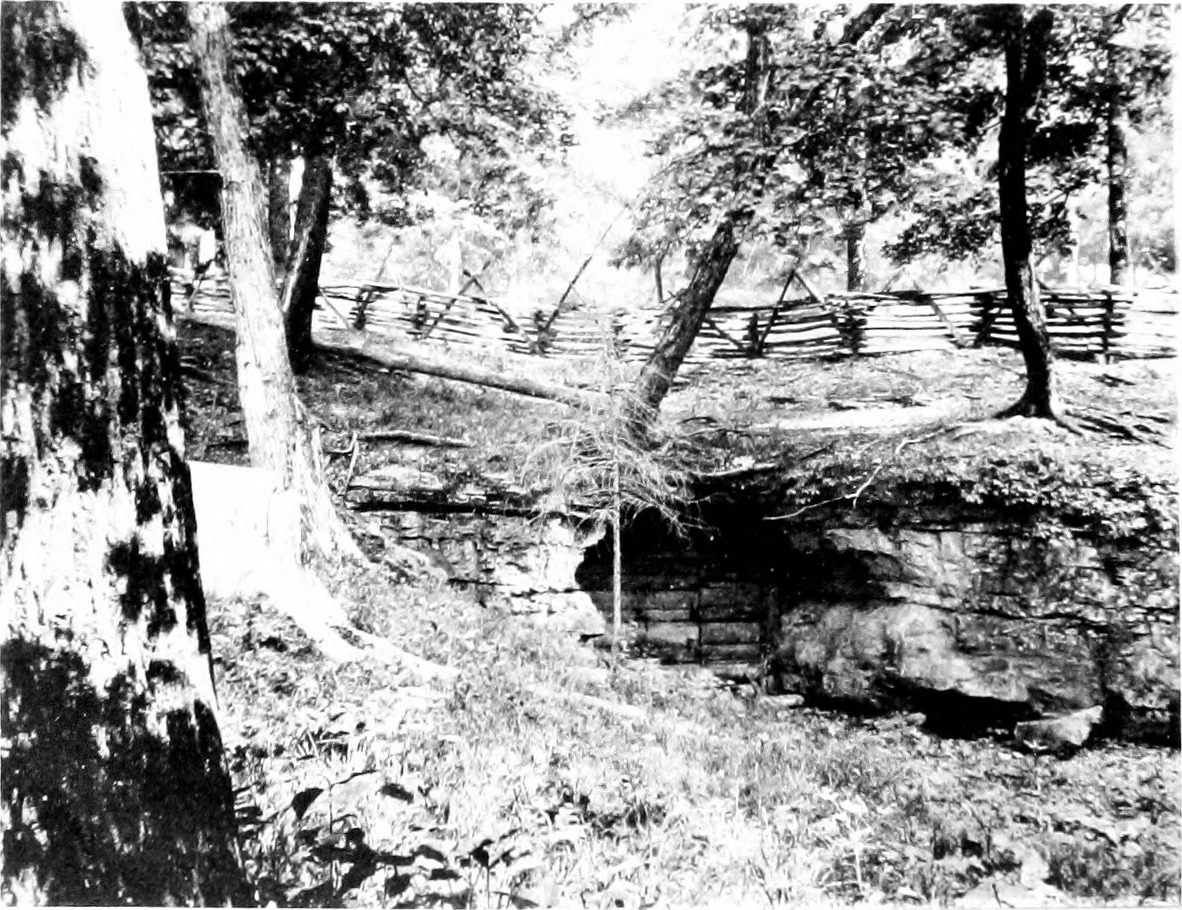
Second view of the mouth of Mayfield's Cave in Indiana, by Banta (1907)
