= Charles Vane-Tempest-Stewart =

Charles Vane-Tempest-Stewart may refer to:

- Charles Vane-Tempest-Stewart, 6th Marquess of Londonderry (1852 – 1915), British Conservative politician, landowner and benefactor
- Charles Vane-Tempest-Stewart, 7th Marquess of Londonderry (1878 – 1949), British Secretary of State for Air; praised the Nazis
