= Priday =

Priday is a surname. Notable people with the surname include:

- Alun Priday (born 1933), Welsh rugby player
- Rachel Lee Priday (born 1988), Korean-American violinist
- Robert Priday (1925–1998), South African footballer
- Thomas Priday (c. 1912–1939), British WWII soldier
- Tony Priday (1922–2014), British bridge player and journalist
