= Redmarley D'Abitot =

Coordinates: 51°58′50″N 2°21′37″W

- Village and civil parish
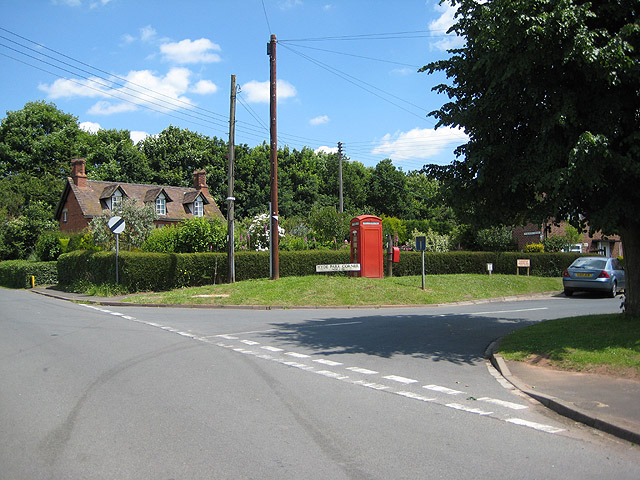
- Hyde Park Corner, Redmarley D'Abitot

- Location within Gloucestershire
- Population: 756 (2011 Census)
- OS grid reference: SO752314
- District: Forest of Dean
- Shire county: Gloucestershire
- Region: South West
- Country: England
- Sovereign state: United Kingdom
- Post town: Gloucester
- Postcode district: GL19
- Dialling code: 01531/01452
- Police: Gloucestershire
- Fire: Gloucestershire
- Ambulance: South Western
- UK Parliament: Forest of Dean

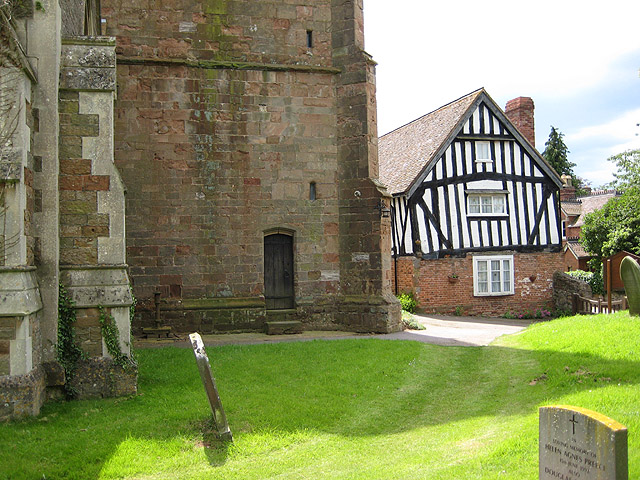
Church House, close to the tower of St Bartholomew's Church, Redmarley D'Abitot

Redmarley D'Abitot is a civil parish and village in the Forest of Dean district, Gloucestershire, South West England. In addition to the village of Redmarley, the civil parish also includes the settlements of Lowbands, Haw Cross, Playley Green, Kings Green and Durbridge. At the 2001 census the parish had a population of 705, increasing to 756 at the 2011 census.

Although now in Gloucestershire, Redmarley was in Worcestershire until 1931.

== History ==
The name Redmarley comes from 'woodland clearing with a reedy pond', from the Old English words hrëod and lëah. An alternative cod-derivation has been suggested as from the local red heavy clay or marl. The difficulty with this explanation is that the word marl entered the language many centuries later. D'Abitot is thought to come from Urse d'Abetot, who was Sheriff of Worcestershire and who held the manor in 1086.

Sometimes a circumflex is placed on the 'o' of d'Abitot, but this usage has been criticised. As Eric Smith says: "It is to be regretted that the Gloucestershire County Council placed a circumflex in the signs on the A417. This is emphatically incorrect, both historically and linguistically, Abitot is a word of (Germanic) Anglo-Saxon origin."

=== Great Domesday ===
In the reign of William the Conqueror, a report on Redmarley D'Abitot was in the Domesday Book of 1086. People mentioned include: Aethelric; Alvred; Alweard; Ansgot; Azur; Beorhtric son of Aelfgar; Beorhtwine; Cyneweard daughter of Sigrefr; Dodda; Durand; Ealdraed, etc.

=== Battle of Redmarley ===
Redmarley's fields were the site of a battle in 1644 during the Civil War. About 2000 to 3000 troops were involved and Royalist leader General Mynn was killed.

== Governance ==
The village falls in the 'Redmarley' electoral ward. This ward stretches south to Pauntley. The total ward population taken at the 2011 census was 1,856.

== Famous residents ==
- Alice Roberts was living with her widowed mother, Julia, at Hazeldine House in Redmarley at the time of her engagement to the composer Edward Elgar.
- Barbara Cartland's mother, Polly Scobell, grew up at the Down House and as a small girl Barbara was a regular visitor from Pershore.
- Corporal Thomas Priday, the first British soldier to lose his life in the Second World War, lived here.

== Distances from Redmarley ==
- 3 miles north of Newent
- 5 miles south of Ledbury
- 10 miles north west of Gloucester
- 16 miles south-east of Hereford
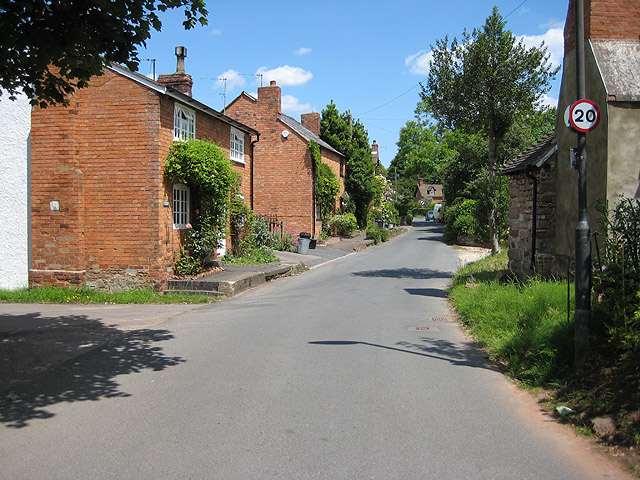
The Causeway

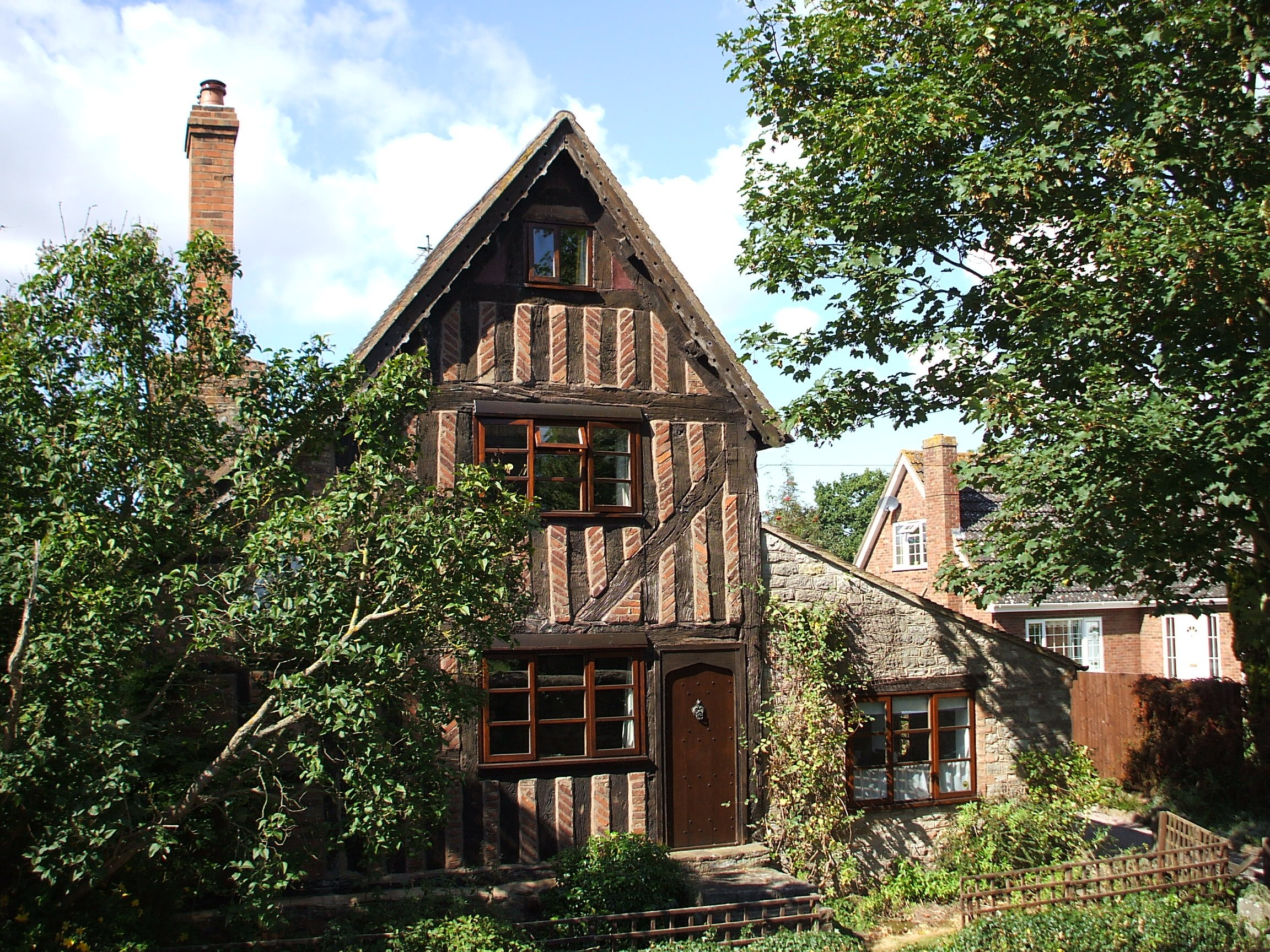
Old building

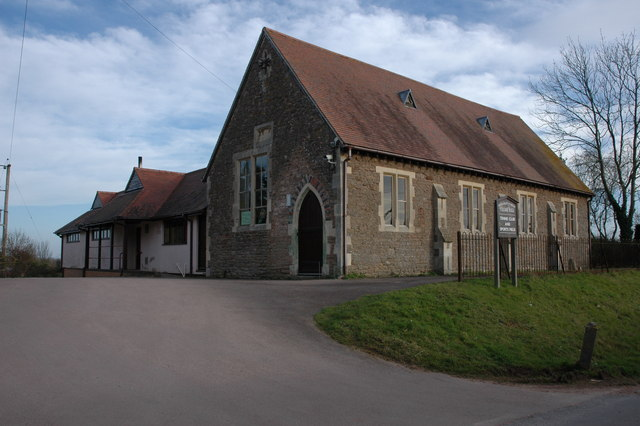
Village hall

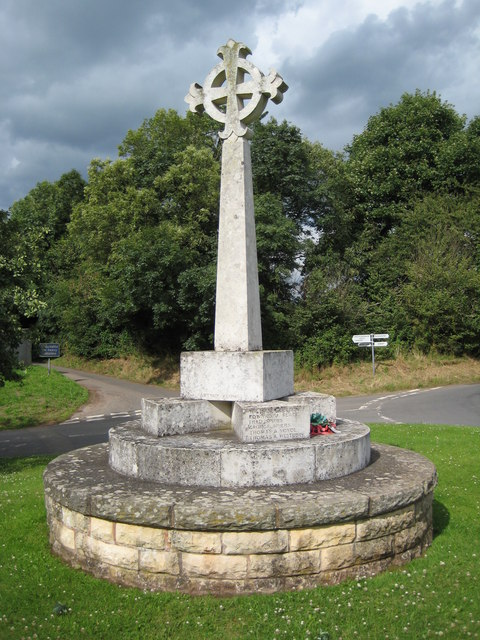
War memorial

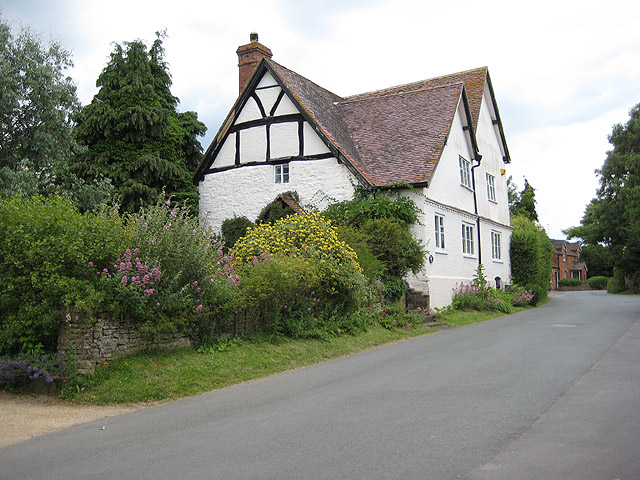
Once an inn
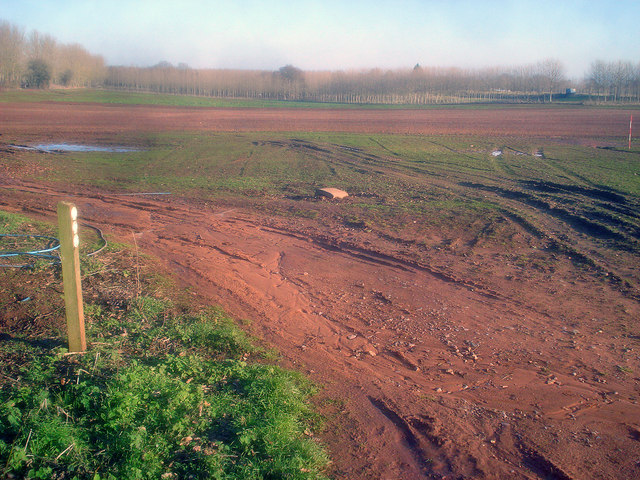

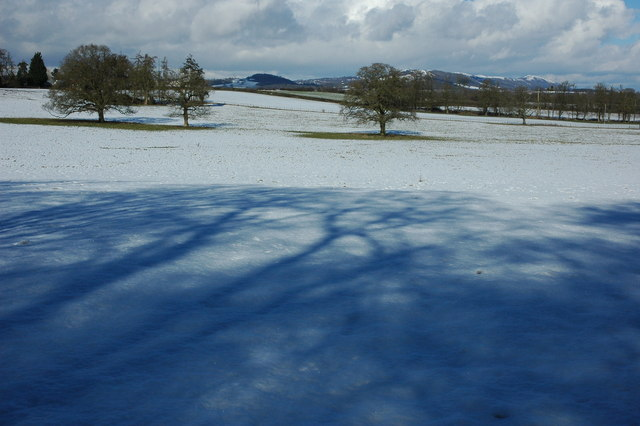

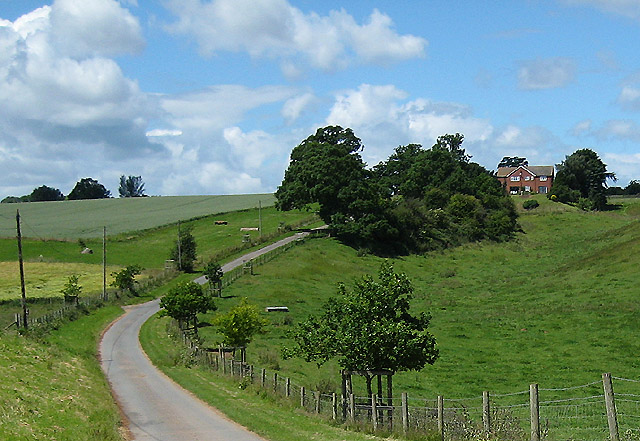

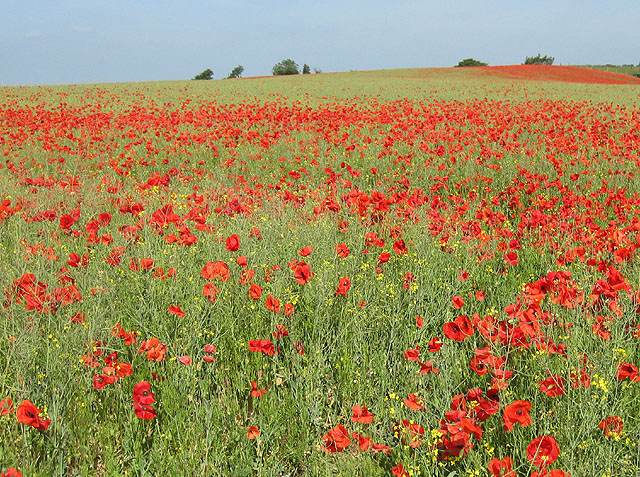

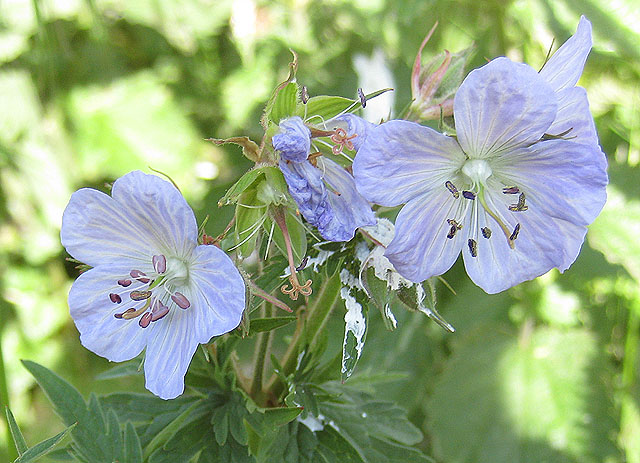
