= Alun Priday =

Welsh rugby player (born 1933)

- Full name: Alun James Priday
- Born: 23 January 1933 (age 93) Whitchurch, Cardiff, Wales
- School: Whitchurch Grammar School

Rugby union career
- Position: Fullback
Senior career
Years	Team	Apps	(Points)
1953–66	Cardiff	410	(1799)
International career
Years	Team	Apps	(Points)
1958–61	Wales	2	(0)

Alun James Priday (born 23 January 1933) is a Welsh former international rugby union player.

Born and raised in Cardiff, Priday was educated at Whitchurch Grammar School and first experienced senior rugby as a 16-year old playing with Tongwynlais, before joining Cardiff RFC in 1953.

Priday made 410 appearances for Cardiff, scoring 1,799 points as a goal-kicking fullback.

Capped twice by Wales, Priday made his debut against Ireland at Lansdowne Road during the 1958 Five Nations, filling in for Terry Davies, the established fullback of the time. He had to wait until the 1961 Five Nations for another opportunity, once more against Ireland, this time in a home fixture at Cardiff Arms Park.

== See also ==
- List of Wales national rugby union players
