= Thomas Priday =

British soldier

Thomas William Priday
- Born: 1912/1913; Redmarley, Gloucestershire, England
- Died: 9 December 1939 (aged 26–27) near Metz, France
- Burial place: Luttange Communal Cemetery, France; 49°16'19.3"N 6°18'53.0"E
- Military career
- Allegiance: United Kingdom
- Branch: British Army
- Rank: Corporal
- Service number: 4031789
- Unit: King's Shropshire Light Infantry
- Conflicts: World War II: Phoney War †

Corporal Thomas William Priday (1912/1913– 9 December 1939) was the first British Army soldier to be killed in action during the Second World War.

== Early life ==
The son of Allen L. Priday and Elisabeth A. Priday of The Gravel Pits, Redmarley in Gloucestershire. His baptism is recorded as having taken place on 1 June 1913 in Redmarley. Priday travelled to Canada aboard the Canada Pacific Line ship 'Montrose' in 1930 to work in farming. He returned to the UK in 1932 aboard the 'Duchess of Atholl' of the same line.

== Service in France ==
Following the declaration of war by the United Kingdom and France on Nazi Germany on 3 September 1939 a British Expeditionary Force (BEF) under the command of Lord Gort was sent to France. Although technical personnel had been arriving since September 4, the force began their move as a whole on September 10.

Lord Gort outlines in his dispatches that he made arrangements in November 1939 for a British brigade to serve on the Saar Front under French command. It was while serving in this capacity that Corporal Priday was killed in the area of Metz. On 9 December 1939 he was out on a night patrol when the group he was with lost their way in the dark. Corporal Priday stepped on a French landmine and was killed. He was buried with full military honours at Luttange Communal Cemetery. The funeral was attended by the French General in command of the area as well as a detachment of French troops. He died at the age of 27 while serving as a corporal with the 1st Battalion of the King's Shropshire Light Infantry (KSLI).

His death was reported in The Times on 1 January 1940 under the headline 'First British Soldier Killed in Action'.

Priday's younger brother Archibald served with the same battalion.

His family reside in Gloucestershire.
