= Patrixbourne =

Village in Kent, England

Coordinates: 51.255°N 1.136°E

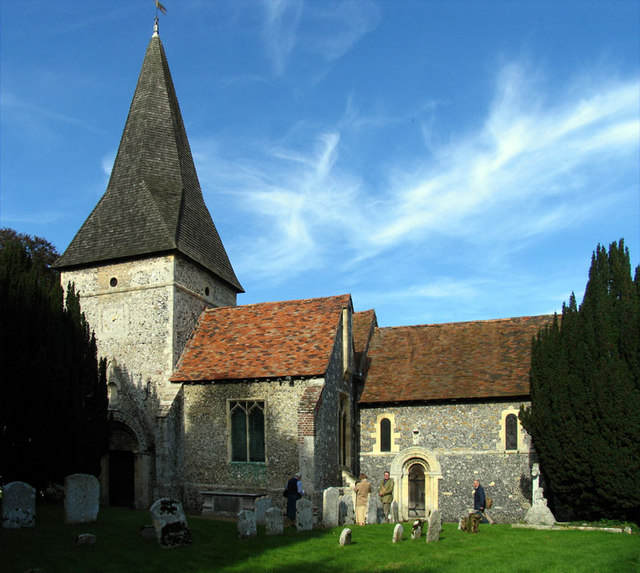
- St Mary's Church, Patrixbourne

- Location within Kent
- OS grid reference: TR188553
- Civil parish: Bekesbourne-with-Patrixbourne
- District: City of Canterbury
- Shire county: Kent
- Region: South East
- Country: England
- Sovereign state: United Kingdom
- Post town: CANTERBURY
- Postcode district: CT4
- Dialling code: 01227
- Police: Kent
- Fire: Kent
- Ambulance: South East Coast
- UK Parliament: Canterbury

Patrixbourne is a village and former civil parish, now in the parish of Bekesbourne-with-Patrixbourne, in the Canterbury district in Kent, England. It is 3 miles (5 km) south-east of Canterbury. It is mostly taken up by agricultural hills and along with almost contiguous Bekesbourne. In 1931 the parish had a population of 245.

== Geography ==
The village is about 3 miles from the city centre along the A2 road to Dover, on a ford over the River Nailbourne.

== History ==
In the Domesday Book Patrixbourne was held by Bishop Odo, but in 1200 it was transferred to a cell of an abbey in Normandy and thereafter to Merton Priory. After the Reformation it passed to the Says and then the Cheyneys.

An Anglo-Saxon cemetery is on the Bifrons estate or Bifron's Park in the south of the village. Bifrons took its name from a name for the Roman god Janus ("the two-faced") as well as having two wings and was built in the early 1600s by John Bargrave (Bargar) the Elder, brother of Isaac Bargrave, Dean of Canterbury. The Bargrave family were staunchly Royalist during the Civil War and Bargrave's son John sold the estate in 1661 as he resumed his ecclesiastical career after the Restoration. In September 1694 the estate was bought by Sandwich MP John Taylor. It was remodelled by Edward Taylor in 1770 and, in 1820, became the seat of Elizabeth, Marchioness Conyngham, wife of the 1st Marquess Conyngham and last mistress of King George IV. The house was demolished in the late 1940s.

The parish church dates from the late Norman period and is dedicated to St Mary. It is built of flint and Caen Stone imported from France and contains 16th and 17th century stained glass from Switzerland.

On 1 April 1987 the civil parish was abolished to form "Bekesbourne with Patrixbourne", part also went to Bridge and the unparished area of Canterbury.

== Amenities ==
Higham Park is a large neoclassical mansion, once the home of eccentric racing driver Count Louis Zborowski. His giant-engined "Chitty Bang Bang" cars were built there, as was Babs, the vehicle used in J.G. Parry-Thomas's attempt for the land speed record at Pendine Sands in 1927. It is in the far south of the parish, so its nearest amenities are either those of Patrixbourne or of Bridge.
