= Bligh Bros =

British coachbuilders associated with Louis Zborowski and the Chitty Bang Bang cars

Bligh Bros. or Bligh Brothers of Canterbury was a British coachbuilder initially producing carriage and, in the 20th century, bodies for automobiles. Amongst the most famous creations by Bligh Brothers are the unique race cars known as Chitty Bang Bang, which inspired the book Chitty-Chitty-Bang-Bang by author Ian Fleming and the later film adaptation, Chitty Chitty Bang Bang.

== Company History ==
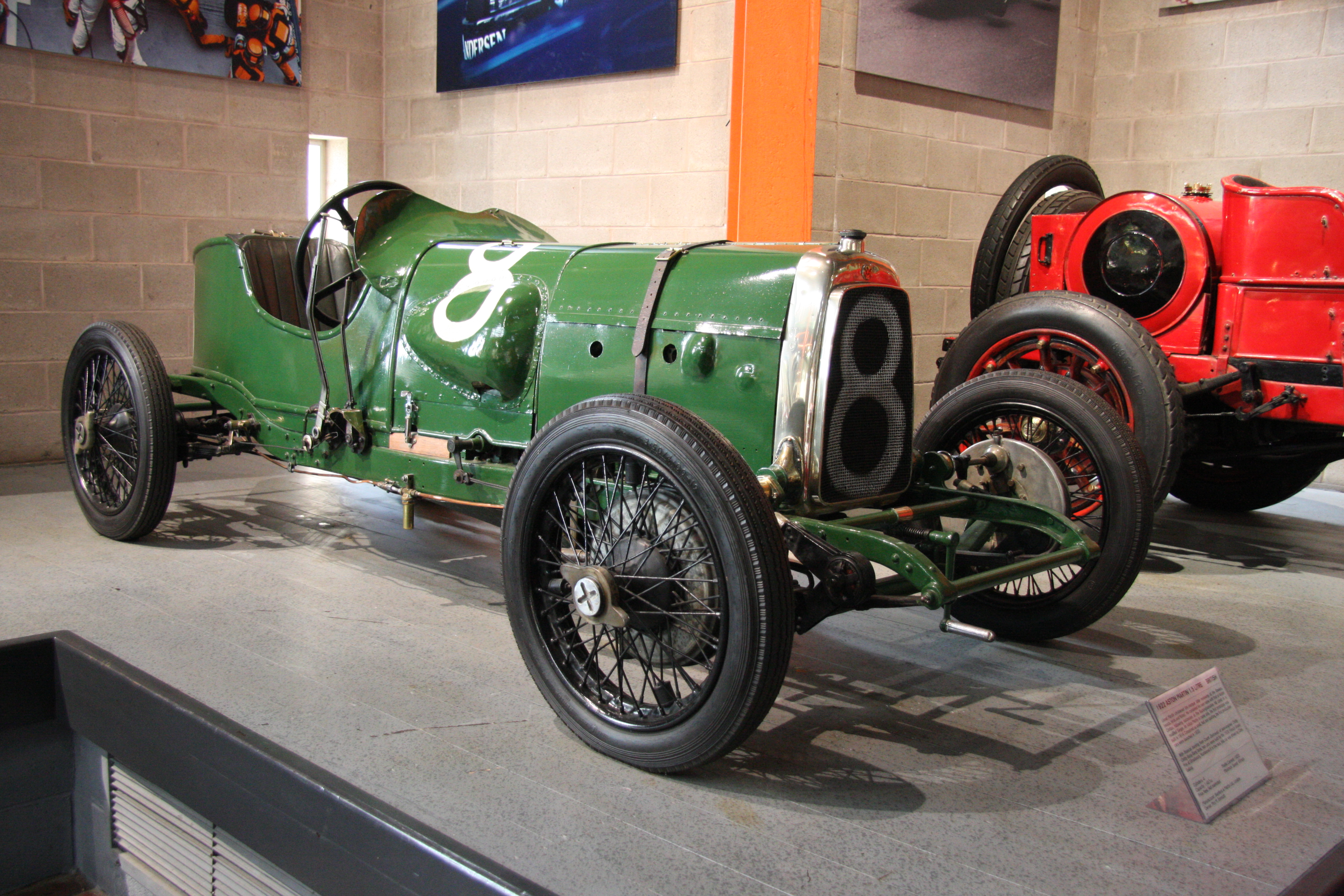
An example of an early Aston Martin Grand Prix car, of the style of vehicle once rebodied by Bligh Bros.

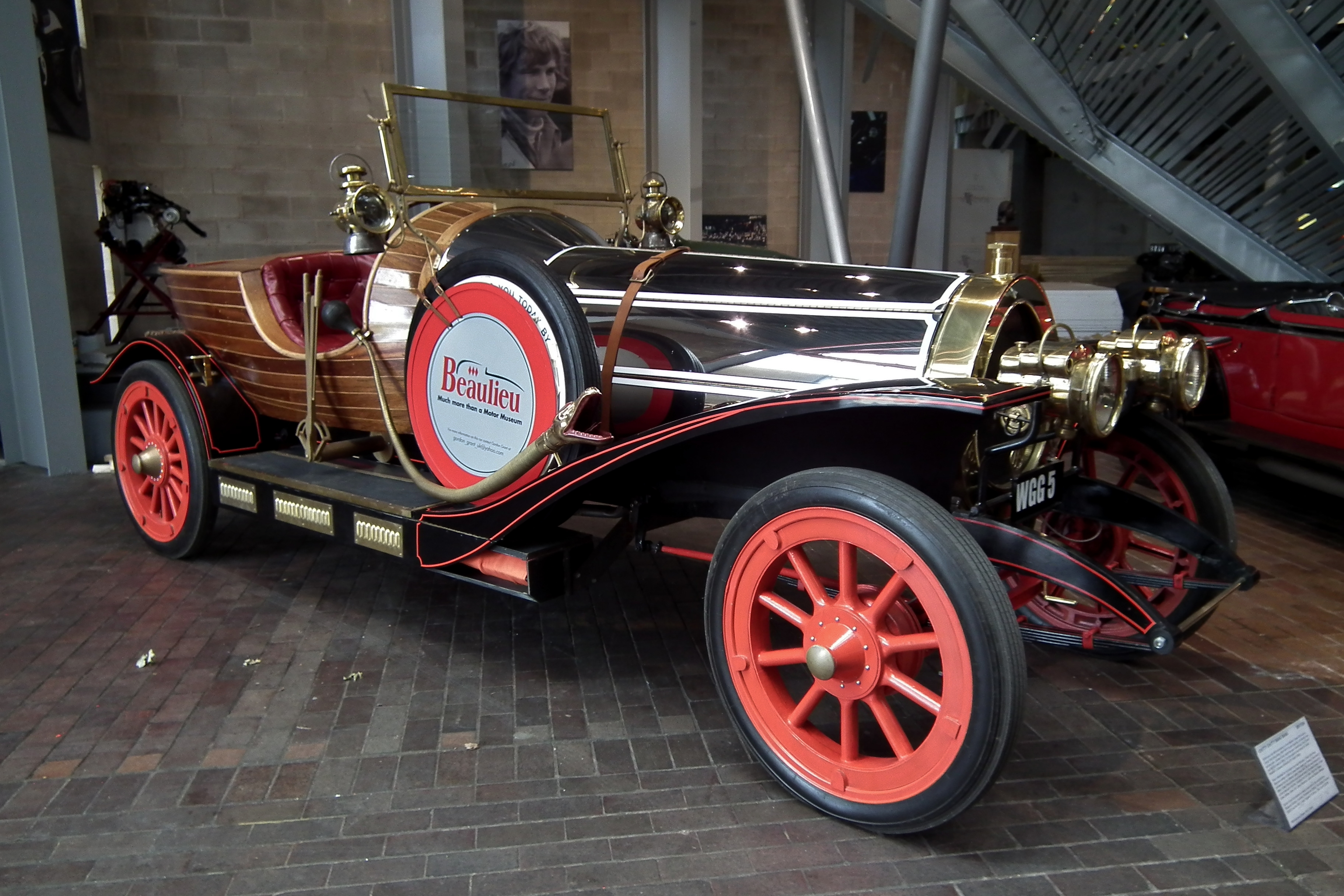
1968 replica Chitty Chitty Bang Bang film car. The film drew loose inspiration from the original Chitty Bang Bang cars which had been bodied by Bligh Bros.

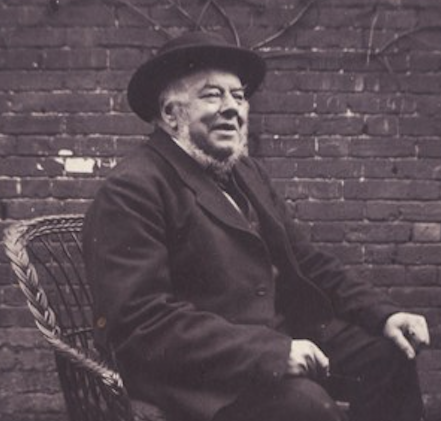
William Bligh (second generation), of Bligh Bros. coachbuilders, Canterbury, England.

Bligh Brothers was based in the south-eastern English city of Canterbury. The company was founded in 1812 by William Bligh, who initially worked as a wheelwright. By the mid-19th century his sons William, John, Jasper, and Henry took over the business, whilst another son, James, founded his own coachworks in Ramsgate.

Around 1860, the company started producing complete carriages. Bligh mainly served local clients from the county of Kent, but around 1870, it expanded to London. Bligh Brothers opened a showroom in the city center at 117 Long Acre, Covent Garden. In the capital, the company achieved several successes; Bligh's designs won awards at national and international exhibitions multiple times. At its peak size, Bligh Brothers was employing around 50 staff.

With the increasing popularity of automobiles at the beginning of the 20th century, numerous British carriage manufacturers shifted their production to automobile bodies. Examples include Barker, Maythorn, and Rippon Brothers.

During the pre-war period, Bligh Brothers faced financial difficulties. The business was now being run by a third generation of Blighs, two sons of William junior; Sidney and Thomas. They had to give up the showroom in London, and they were going through bankruptcy proceedings by 1913.

During World War I the firm was tasked with manufacturing artillery wheels. After the end of the war, Bligh was taken over by Louis Zborowski, who lived at the Higham Park estate near Canterbury. This ultimately saved the firm as demand for automotive work rapidly replaced traditional carriage coachwork, and served Zborowski's need for skilled craftspeople and premises to work on his growing stable of vehicles. It was around this time as Zborowski also invested in ailing race car manufacturer, Aston Martin, in a similar effort to save it from bankruptcy.

Zborowski, a passionate amateur racing driver, constructed four race cars, which he named Chitty Bang Bang. Some of them were equipped with aero engines acquired from the war disposals commission. Bligh produced the bodies. At the same time, Bligh also produced bodies for race and road vehicles including early Aston Martins and a Hispano-Suiza, a unique commission by Zborowski.

Bligh were known for fitting long tail sections onto Zborowski's vehicles. They also assisted in the repair of TT2, one of the first two Aston Martin Grand Prix race cars, which was involved in an accident whilst being driven back from the 1923 Spanish Grand Prix.

Bligh Brothers were eventually responsible for manufacturing the bodies of over twenty vehicles for Zborowski. This also included the Higham Special. Many years later this particular car was re-bodied and renamed Babs, and in 1927 broke the world land speed record whilst driven by J.G. Parry-Thomas, but was wrecked in a fatal subsequent attempt to regain the title.

After Zborowski's accidental death in October 1924 at the Italian Grand Prix, Bligh ceased coachbuilding. Their Mercedes works van was used to transport Zborowski's body back to Higham Park, and the workers of the firm were paid out as part of the distribution of his estate. The company focused on repairing automobiles and car trading. Over the following decades, numerous branches were added to the main headquarters in Canterbury, throughout eastern Kent. The business eventually closed in 1974.

The building on Radigund Street in Canterbury where Bligh Brothers was headquartered still exists and is marked with a blue plaque. It now forms part of The King's School, Canterbury.

== Surviving Examples ==
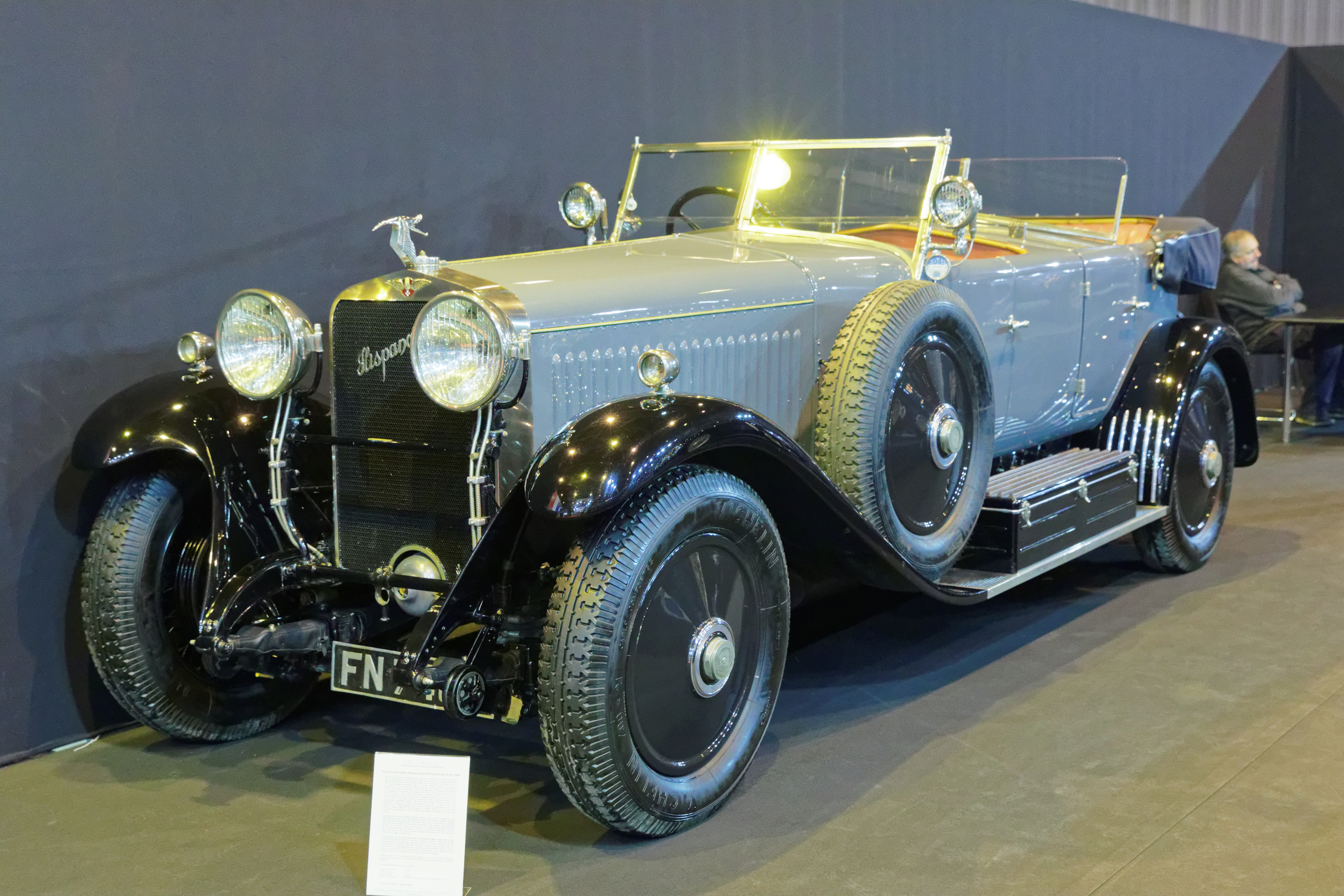
Hispano Suiza H6B Dual Cowl Tourer, bodied by Bligh Bros.

Zborowski’s Bligh Brothers bodied Hispano Suiza is owned and exhibited by renowned industrial designer Marc Newson.

The Bligh-bodied Chitty Bang Bang II is in the collection of the late Bob Bahre in Paris, Maine, USA, which forms part of the Annual Founders Day celebrations for the town.
