= Clive Gallop =

British WWI veteran and automotive engineer (1892–1960)

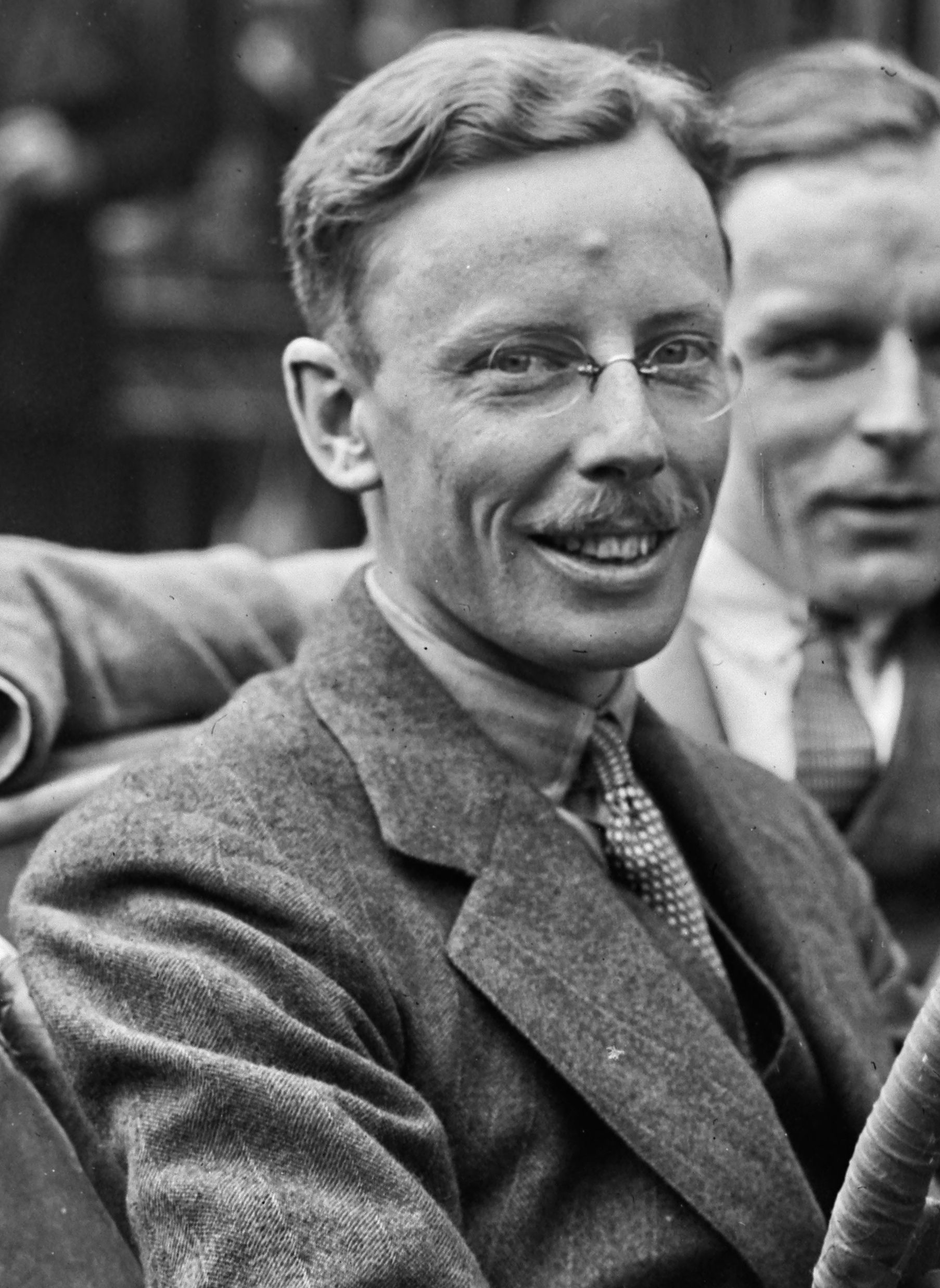
- Gallop at the 1922 French Grand Prix
- Born: 4 February 1892; Cairo, Egypt
- Died: 7 September 1960 (aged 68); Leatherhead, Surrey, England
- Military career
- Allegiance: United Kingdom
- Branch: Royal Air Force
- Rank: Colonel
- Commands: No. 56 Squadron
- Conflicts: World War I
- Other work: Race driver and Engineer

Colonel Reginald Clive Gallop (4 February 1892 – 7 September 1960) was a British engineer, racing driver and First World War pilot. He was one of the team which developed their first engine for Bentley Motors.

== Royal Flying Corps ==
Clive Gallop joined the Royal Flying Corps, flying aeroplanes over the Western Front. He commanded a number of flights, including No. 56 Squadron.

London racing driver, motor vehicle dealer and engineer W. O. Bentley had suggested aluminium pistons to his car supplier Doriot, Flandrin & Parant and had them installed in those cars he imported. Following commissioning on the outbreak of war as an engineer by the Royal Naval Air Service Bentley was sent to Gwynnes pumps workshops in Chiswick which were making French Clerget engines under license. Part of Bentley's duties was to liaise between the squadrons in the field in France and the factory's engineering staff which is how he came to meet Gallop. Clerget was very unwilling to act on Bentley's more important suggestions so the Royal Navy sent Bentley to Humber Limited in Coventry.

At Humber, Bentley was given a team to design his own aero-engine. The resulting engine, fundamentally different from the Clerget though—for ease of production—alike in the design of the cam mechanism, was running in prototype by early summer 1916. This was the BR1, Bentley Rotary 1, with the bigger BR2 followed in early 1918. Gallop helped Bentley bring both into service with the Royal Flying Corps.

At the end of hostilities and leaving his commission with the Royal Flying Squadron, Gallop joined the Royal Aero Club.

== Bentley Motors ==
In January 1919, a group was formed in Cricklewood by W O Bentley, engine designer and pioneer of aluminium pistons who had turned in wartime to aero engines, to build his own cars. With a group including Frederick Tasker Burgess, formerly of Humber, and Harry Varley, formerly of Vauxhall, he set about designing a high quality sporting engine, the design of which was based on elements of the 3-litre racing Peugeot and the 1914 Grand Prix Mercedes engine.

Gallop joined the team in June 1919 and developed the overhead camshaft for the 3,000 cubic centimetres (180 cu in) straight-4 engine. Although large for its day compared to similar engines from Bugatti, it was its technical innovations that were most noticed. One of the first production engines with 4 valves per cylinder, and among the first with two spark plugs per cylinder, pent-roof combustion chambers, and twin carburettors. It was extremely undersquare, optimized for low-end torque, with a bore of 80 millimetres (3.1 in) and a stroke of 149 millimetres (5.9 in). To increase durability, and to negate the need for a head gasket, which WO Bentley saw as an inherent weakness, the iron engine block and cylinder head were cast as a single unit.

Power output was roughly 70 brake horsepower (52 kW), allowing the final Bentley 3 Litre car via a four-speed gearbox to reach 80 miles per hour (130 km/h). The Speed Model could reach 90 miles per hour (140 km/h), while the later Super Sports, which was lighter in weight and had a higher compression ratio, passed 100 miles per hour (160 km/h).

In a race against time, the very first engine was married with a chassis partially copied from a Humber, just in time for the first post-war Motor Show at Olympia in November 1919.

== Louis Zborowski ==
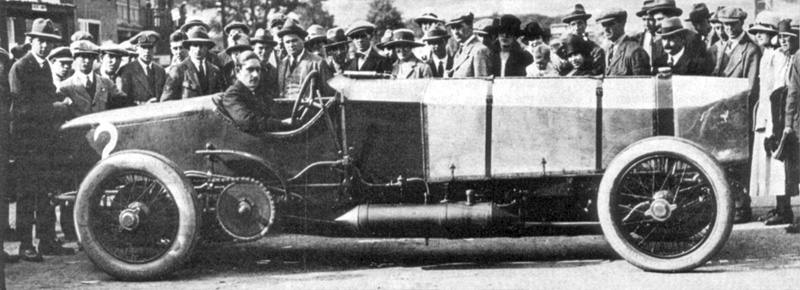
Louis Zborowski in the driving seat of Chitty Bang Bang 1 at Brooklands

From 1921, Gallop joined "Count" Louis Zborowski at his Higham Park estate. As well as acting as his co-driver in numerous races, and as driver of the team's second Aston Martin in others (i.e.: 1922 French Grand Prix), he also helped Zborowski design and build four of his own racing cars in the estate's stables.

The first car was powered by a 23,093 cc six-cylinder Maybach aero engine and called "Chitty Bang Bang". A second "Chitty Bang Bang" was powered by 18,882 Benz aero engine. A third car was based on a Mercedes 28/95, but fitted with a 14,778 cc 6-cylinder Mercedes aero engine and was referred to as The White Mercedes. These cars achieved some success at Brooklands.

Another car, also built at Higham Park with a huge 27-litre aero engine, was called the "Higham Special" – later known as "Babs"- and was used in J.G. Parry-Thomas's fatal attempt for the land speed record at Pendine Sands in 1927.

In January 1922 Zborowski, his wife Vi, Gallop and Pixi Marix together with a couple of mechanics took Chitty Bang Bang and the White Mercedes across the Mediterranean for a drive into the Sahara Desert, in the tracks of Citroen's kegresse expedition.

In 1923, Zborowski joined with American engineer Harry Arminius Miller, driving the single-seat "American Miller 122" at that year's Italian Grand Prix. Zborowski died aged 29 the following year whilst racing for Mercedes-Benz in the same race, after hitting a tree.

== Bentley Boys ==
At the end of his partnership with Zborowski in 1924, Gallop as a friend of Woolf Barnato rejoined Bentley Motors in 1925 after his friend bought into the business. This led to him both supporting the racing efforts of the "Bentley Boys", as well as developing the engine for the Bentley 4½ Litre.

== Blower Bentley ==
If Bentley wanted a more powerful car, he developed a bigger capacity model. The Bentley Speed Six was a huge car, which Ettore Bugatti once referred to as "the world's fastest lorry" ("Le camion plus vite du monde").

In 1928, Bentley Boy Sir Henry "Tim" Birkin had come to the conclusion that the future lay in getting more power from a lighter model by fitting a supercharger to the 4½ litre Bentley, refusing to adhere strictly to Bentley's assertion that increasing displacement is always preferable to forced induction. Bentley believed that:

To supercharge a Bentley engine was to pervert its design and corrupt its performance

When Bentley Motors refused to create the supercharged model, Birkin determined to develop it himself. Mercedes-Benz had been using compressors for a few years.

=== Development ===
With financial backing from Dorothy Paget, a wealthy horse racing enthusiast financing the project after his own money had run out, Birkin set-up his own engineering works for the purpose of developing the car at Welwyn Garden City, Hertfordshire.

With an engine and car to be developed by Gallop, Birkin engaged supercharger specialist Amherst Villiers. Gallop had designed the 4½ Litre Bentley engine with a single overhead camshaft actuating four valves per cylinder, inclined at 30 degrees, a technically advanced design at a time where most cars still used only two valves per cylinder.

Bentley refused to allow the engine to be modified to incorporate the compressor. The huge Roots-type supercharger ("blower") was hence added in front of the radiator, driven straight from the crankshaft. This gave the Blower Bentley a unique and easily recognisable profile, and exacerbated its understeer. A guard protected the two carburetters located at the compressor intake. Similar protection was used (both in the 4½ Litre and the Blower) for the fuel tank at the rear, because a flying stone punctured the 3 Litre of Frank Clement and John Duff during the first 24 Hours of Le Mans, possibly depriving them of victory. The crankshaft, pistons and lubrication system were special to the Blower engine.

These additions and modifications took the power of the base car from:

- Unblown: touring model 110 bhp (82 kW); racing model 130 bhp (97 kW).
- Blower: touring model 175 bhp (130 kW) @ 3,500rpm; racing model 242 bhp (180 kW) @ 2,400 rpm.

The "Bentley Blower" was born, more powerful than the 6½ Litre despite lacking the two additional cylinders. The downside was that Blower Bentleys consume 4 liters of fuel per minute at full speed.

=== Production ===
The original Bentley Blower No.1 had a taut canvas top stretched over a lightweight Weymann aluminium frame, housing a two-seat body. This presented a very light but still resistant to wind structure. It was officially presented in 1929 at the British International Motor Show at Olympia, London.

No. 1 first appeared at the Essex six-hour race at Brooklands on 29 June 1929. However, the car initially proved to be very unreliable. "W.O." had never accepted the blower Bentley, but with effective company owner and financial backer Barnato's support, Birkin persuaded "W.O." to produce the fifty supercharged cars necessary for the model to be accepted for Le Mans.

In addition to these production cars built by Bentley Motors, Birkin got Gallop to engineer a racing series of four remodelled "prototypes" plus a spare:

- No. 1: a track car for Brooklands, but with headlights and mudguards.
- No's 2, 3 and 4: Road registered (No. 2 – GY3904; No. 3 – GY3905).
- No.5: a fifth car, registered for the road, assembled from spare parts.

== Death ==
Gallop was thrown from a skidding car in Leatherhead Surrey on 7 September 1960. He was taken to hospital but was found dead on arrival.
