= RH&DR No.1 Green Goddess =

British 4-6-2 steam locomotive

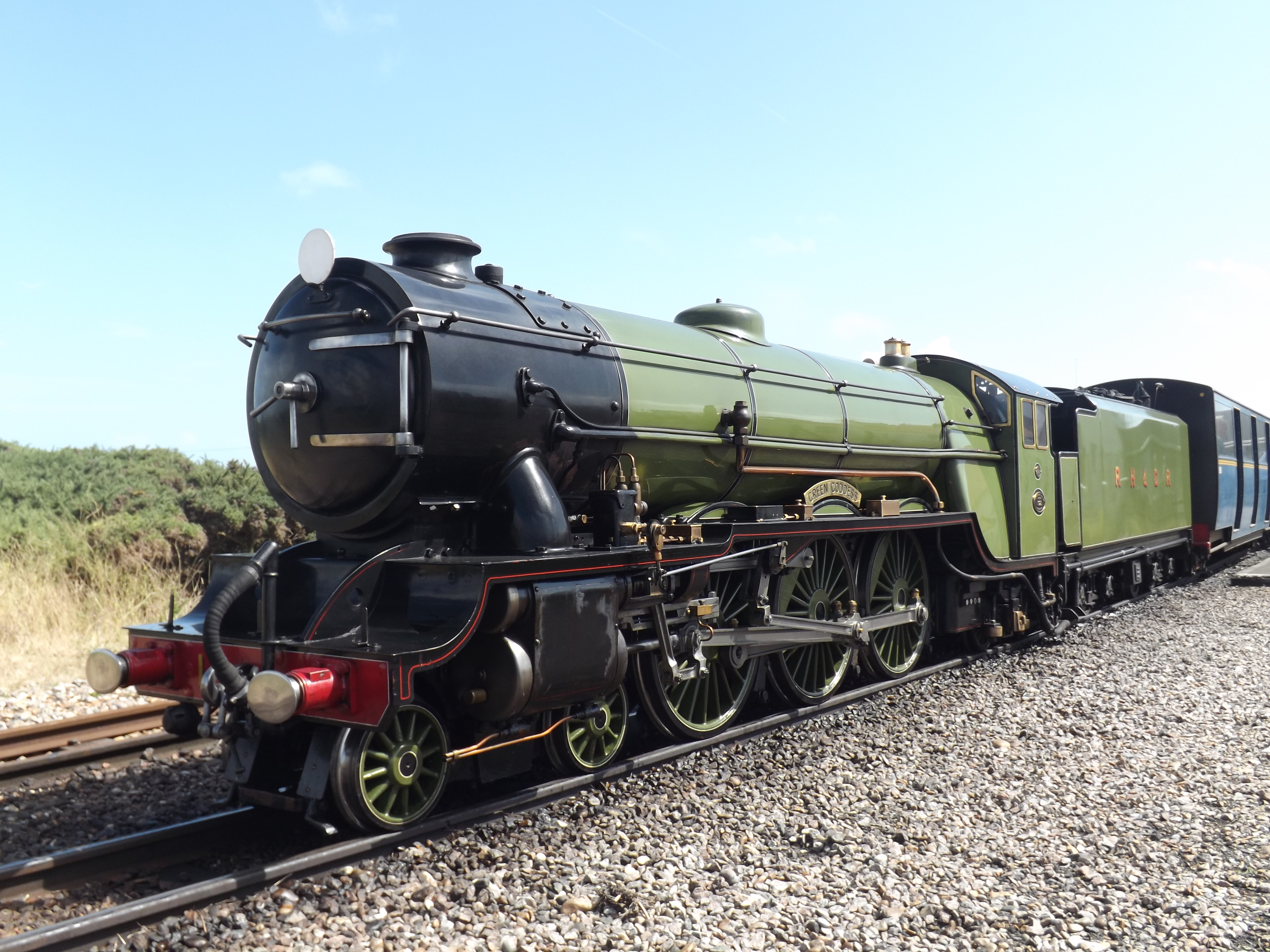
- No. 1 'Green Goddess' waits for departure at Dungeness on the Romney, Hythe and Dymchurch Railway. August 2016.
Type and origin
- Power type: Steam
- Designer: Henry Greenly
- Builder: Davey Paxman & Co.
- Serial number: 15469
- Model: A1/A3 Gresley-style pacific
- Build date: 1925
Specifications
- Configuration
  - Whyte: 4-6-2
- Leading dia.: 12 in (305 mm)
- Driver dia.: 25 1/2 in (648 mm)
- Trailing dia.: 12 in (305 mm)
- Length: 27 ft 7 in (8.41 m)
- Total weight: 8 long tons 10 cwt (19,000 lb or 8.6 t)
- Tender type: RH&DR High Capacity
- Fuel type: Coal
- Fuel capacity: 550 kg (0.54 long tons; 1,210 lb)
- Cylinders: 2
- Cylinder size: 5 1/4 in × 8 1/2 in (133 mm × 216 mm)
- Valve gear: Walschaerts
- Loco brake: Air
- Train brakes: Air
Performance figures
- Maximum speed: 40 mph (64 km/h) (design max); 35 mph (56 km/h) (testing); 20–25 mph (32–40 km/h) (regular service)
- Tractive effort: 3,177 lbf (14.13 kN)
Career
- Operators: Romney, Hythe and Dymchurch Railway
- Class: Pacific
- Numbers: 1
- Official name: Green Goddess
- Locale: New Romney
- Delivered: 1925
- First run: 1926
- Restored: 09/06/2019
- Current owner: RH&DR
- Disposition: In regular service

Romney, Hythe and Dymchurch Railway (RH&DR) locomotive No.1 Green Goddess is a 4-6-2 steam locomotive built by Davey Paxman & Co. in 1925 with the works number 15469. It was one of two original locomotives ordered by Captain Howey and Count Louis Zborowski in 1924 and was operational the following year, two years before the railway was completed. The design was based on the LNER A1 class which Flying Scotsman belongs to. Its livery was also based on that of Flying Scotsman. The designing was done by Henry Greenly and the total building cost was £1,250, or around £79,800 in 2021.

While on trial at the Ravenglass and Eskdale Railway Green Goddess safely reached a top speed of 35 mph (56 km/h). However due to wear on the valve gear and maintenance costs, a regular running speed limit of 25 mph (40 km/h) is observed. During the later half of the 2023 running season, a Stanier 'hooter' style whistle was fitted - a gift from a friend of the railway. It currently runs in an Apple Green livery similar to that of the former Great Northern Railway.

The engine was stored in the New Romney workshops throughout 2018 for repairs and overhaul. Green Goddess returned to service on 9 June 2019 following a period of repair. Subsequently the locomotive has undertaken regular duties ever since, making regular appearances at the railways Gala's every spring and autumn. During these periods it regularly runs non-stop through main stations, such as New Romney & Dymchurch.
