= Chitty Chitty Bang Bang Flies Again =

Book by Frank Cottrell Boyce

- Author: Frank Cottrell-Boyce
- Illustrator: Joe Berger
- Genre: Children's literature
- Publisher: Macmillan Publishers
- Publication date: November 4, 2011
- Publication place: United Kingdom

Chitty Chitty Bang Bang Flies Again is a children's novel written by Frank Cottrell-Boyce. It is a continuation of Ian Fleming's Chitty-Chitty-Bang-Bang. Boyce was commissioned by the Fleming family to write this sequel. The book was first published by Macmillan Children's Books in 2011.

== Plot ==
Mr. Tooting has just been fired from his job, much to the dismay of Mrs. Tooting, moody daughter Lucy, whizz-kid Jem, and little Harry. Instead of seeking a new job, he decides to fix things around the house. But when his "fixes" turn into disasters, his family decides to find something better for him to do. One day, Mrs. Tooting comes home with an old broken camper-van. She says that Mr. Tooting is just the person to get it working, which he agrees to. Over the next few weeks, he and Jem work together to fix the van and make it run again.

When they go to a local junkyard to find new spark plugs, Mr. Tooting notices something in a tree. What he finds is a very old engine, which he promptly brings down by starting it and revving the engine until it falls. He decides (much to the annoyance of Jem) to put the engine in their van, thinking that it must be special given the name "Zborowski" written on it. Jem also finds a small airplane mascot, which he decides to keep.

Mr. Tooting and Jem return home and collect the family, ready to go on a test drive of the new car. But soon the car begins to act strangely. It disobeys traffic signs, the speed limit, and seems to enjoy racing other cars. The van soon takes them off the freeway and onto an old path. They then find themselves at a Camper-van club, where they forget to put the car in park. The van rides down the hill and over a cliff with Little Harry inside. But the car comes back, having sprouted a set of wings. After making sure everything's alright, the family gets back in the van and flies away.

The next day, the family finds itself parked atop the Eiffel Tower in Paris. They decide to explore the city, before returning that night to get the car down. Mr. Tooting gets a call from someone called Tiny Jack who wants to buy the van. When Mr. Tooting refuses, the man becomes angry and demands the car. Mr. Tooting ends the call and tries to get the van to start. While he does, Jem notices two old lamps attached to a nearby billboard. When he inspects them, he finds the word "Zborowski" written on them, just like the engine. He and Mr. Tooting attach them to the car's grill, after which it starts up. As the family flies away, they notice the car makes a different sound, and decide to give it a name: Chitty Chitty Bang Bang.

The following evening, Chitty runs out of gas and crashes near the Pyramids of Egypt. There, they meet a woman called "Nanny" who has found some old wheels in the sand. She invites the Tootings to stay with her for the evening, which they accept. Nanny takes them to a large estate, where they relax and enjoy themselves. Mr. and Mrs. Tooting decide to go out for the night, leaving the children with their host.

The next morning, the children discover the estate is actually a large boat which has left their parents behind. Nanny actually works for Tiny Jack, who has taken Chitty apart trying to find the "Zborowski Lightning" (the airplane mascot Jem has) leaving them unable to escape. Lucy and Little Henry distract the two by tricking them into playing Hide and Seek. Meanwhile, Jem puts Chitty back together. Once Chitty is done, they grab the old wheels from Egypt (also with the word Zborowski on them) and escape into the sea. Chitty turns into a submarine and after encountering a giant squid, they make their way to the shores of Madagascar.

There, they meet a family who accidentally reels in the van. While Lucy and Little Harry explore the town, Jem sees that the boat the family is using is actually a car shell with the word "Zborowski" on it. Jem finally realizes that Chitty has been taking them around the world so they can collect her old bodywork and put her back together. After trading their camper van for the car shell, a local mechanic takes all the parts and is able to put Chitty back the way she was before the Tootings found her. They drive Chitty into the sky to search for their parents. They soon find their parents and decide to head home to finish Chitty's repairs. Along the way, they learn a little more about Chitty, as well as the family that owned her before them: The Pott Family.

On their way home, Little Harry accidentally pulls a lever (called the Chronojuster) that sends Chitty quickly backwards. When she finally stops, they find themselves in a place filled with Dinosaurs. Jem reads a journal that says the lever shouldn't be used "unless time travel is required".

== Reception ==
Chitty Chitty Bang Bang Flies Again received positive reviews from critics, who praised it for its comedy and characters. The book was also shortlisted for the Roald Dahl Funny Prize.
