= Higham Park =

House in Kent, England

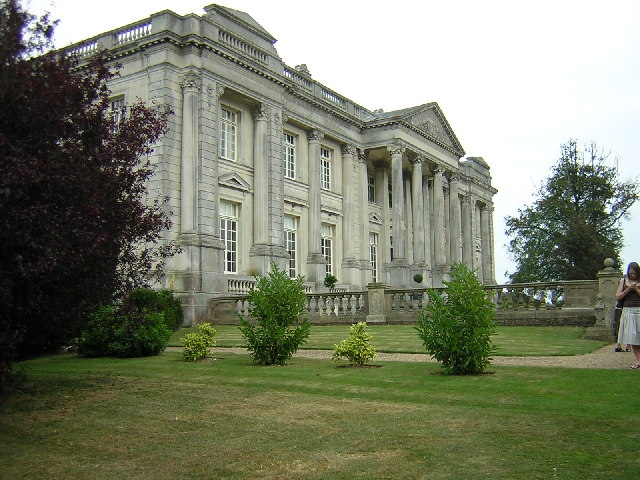
- Palladian front of Higham Park house

- Location within Kent

General information
- Architectural style: Neoclassical
- Location: Bridge, Kent, England
- Coordinates: 51°14′27″N 1°08′28″E
- Completed: 1768
- Renovated: 1910, by Joseph Sawyer (Palladian front piece)

Design and construction
- Designations: Grade II* listed

Other information
- Parking: Yes

Higham Park is a Grade II* listed neoclassical style house and gardens, located at Bridge, Kent, 3 miles (4.8 km) south of Canterbury.

== History ==
=== Origins ===
The basis of Higham Park was formed from 1320, when lands on the north east of the Elham Valley now within the Kent Downs Area of Outstanding Natural Beauty and Special Landscape Area, were ceded to the De Hegham family by Edward II.

In 1534 it was bought by Thomas Culpeper. His Elizabethan cellar floor is the oldest part of the present house, rebuilt to a neoclassical design in 1768.

Throughout its history, Higham Park has been frequented by the rich and famous: Mozart stayed here as a nine-year-old; while Jane Austen, Ian Fleming and General Charles de Gaulle were all guests.

=== William Gay ===
In 1901, London banker William Gay purchased the estate to enable him to house his extensive collection of rare plants and orchids. He reorganised Higham's garden, engaging Harold Peto to design an Italian water garden, complete with 250 yards (230 m) canal, the longest in any garden in England. The gardens have been restored by the current owners to their original Edwardian format.

=== Zborowski family ===
In 1910, Countess Margaret Laura Zborowski purchased the estate for £17,500, which included the farm, 225 acres (91 ha) and twelve houses. Born Margaret Laura Astor Carey, she was a granddaughter of William Backhouse Astor, Sr. of the prominent Astor family. She had been Madame de Stuers before her divorce from Alphonse Lambert Eugène, Chevalier de Stuers (1841–1919). In 1880, she had married Count Eliot Zborowski, who died at the La Turbie hill climb in 1903. Countess Zborowski immediately commissioned a £50,000 refurbishment of the house from the architect Joseph Sawyer, who added the Palladian architecture front, encasing the eighteenth century core.

On her death in 1911, the estate was inherited by her 16-year-old son, Count Louis Vorrow Zborowski. Louis instantly became the fourth richest under-21-year-old in the world, with cash of £11 million and real estate in the United States, including 7 acres (2.8 ha) of Manhattan and several blocks on Fifth Avenue, New York City.

Setting up an engineering works in the stables, Louis and engineer Clive Gallop designed and built the first aero-engine powered racing cars in the world. The pair built four cars, one of which was later immortalised in Ian Fleming's fantasy novel and film production, Chitty Chitty Bang Bang.

The first was powered by a 23,093 cc six-cylinder Maybach aero engine, called "Chitty Bang Bang". A second "Chitty Bang Bang" was powered by 18,882 Benz aero engine. A third car was based on a Mercedes 28/95, but fitted with a 14,778 cc 6-cylinder Mercedes aero engine and was referred to as The White Mercedes. These cars achieved some success at Brooklands.

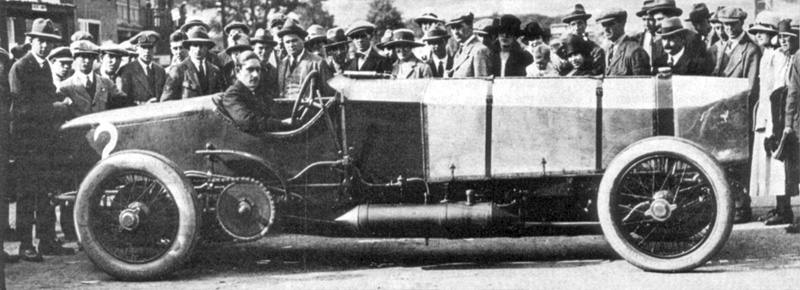
Louis Zborowski in the driving seat of Chitty Bang Bang 1 at Brooklands

Another car, also built at Higham Park with a huge 27-litre aero engine, was called the "Higham Special" and later "Babs" and was used in J.G. Parry-Thomas's fatal attempt for the land speed record at Pendine Sands in 1927.

In January 1922 Louis, his wife Vi, Gallop and Pixi Marix together with a couple of mechanics took Chitty Bang Bang and the White Mercedes across the Mediterranean for a drive into the Sahara Desert, in the tracks of Citroen's kegresse expedition.

Zborowski devised and built a 15 in / 381 mm gauge miniature steam railway that circled the gardens. In a plan with fellow millionaire racing driver Captain J.E.P. Howey, he agreed to donate the rolling stock and infrastructure to a project that became the Romney, Hythe and Dymchurch Railway on the south Kent coast, started after Zborowski's death.

Zborowski joined the Mercedes-Benz team in 1924, but while driving in the Italian Grand Prix that year at Monza, he hit a tree and died instantly. He was just 29 years old.

=== Highland Court ===
In 1928, Zborowski's widow sold the estate to Walter Whigham, chairman of Robert Fleming & Co. merchant bank. Changing the estate name to Highland Court to avoid confusion with the pronunciation of his surname, Whigham's weekend guests included his friend Ian Fleming, who had watched Zborowski's racing cars as a school boy at Brooklands. Whigham's wife, part of the Moët family, remodelled the staircase of unpolished white Italian marble to resemble that of the Hôtel Ritz in Paris. She did however preserve the original wrought ironwork, which had been made by Messrs. Bramah, the same company who produced the gates for the Grand Entrance of Hyde Park, London. In 1929 Whigham built a model farm on the estate, which still exists today as part of the Highland Court Conservation Area.

=== Hospital ===
During the Second World War, like many other country estates, the house was requisitioned by the War Office, designated for use by the British Army as a hospital. It remained serving as a hospital post-War, operating as the gynaecology unit of the Kent and Canterbury Hospital from 1951, until it was closed in 1981.

== Renovation ==
The property and 25 acres (10 ha) were placed on the market by the local NHS Trust in 1994, with associated planning permission to build a 200 bedroom hotel. On 1 September 1995, cousins Amanda Harris-Deans and Patricia Gibb, and Gibb's son Barry, bought the property and land for £1.5M.

They began an ongoing renovation of the virtually derelict estate, but by the mid-2000s the majority of the works were complete.
