= Chitty Bang Bang =

Racing cars

Chitty Bang Bang was the informal name of a number of celebrated British racing cars, built and raced by Count Louis Zborowski and his engineer Clive Gallop in the 1920s, which inspired the book Chitty-Chitty-Bang-Bang.

The cars were built in Canterbury, Kent in the workshop of Bligh Brothers coachbuilders, and stored at Higham Park, Zborowski's country house at Bridge near Canterbury. The cars were so loud that Canterbury reportedly passed a by-law prohibiting them from entering within the city walls. The origin of the name "Chitty Bang Bang" is disputed, but may have been inspired by aeronautical engineer Letitia Chitty, the sound of an idling aeroplane engine or from a salacious World War I song.

== Chitty 1 ==
Chitty 1
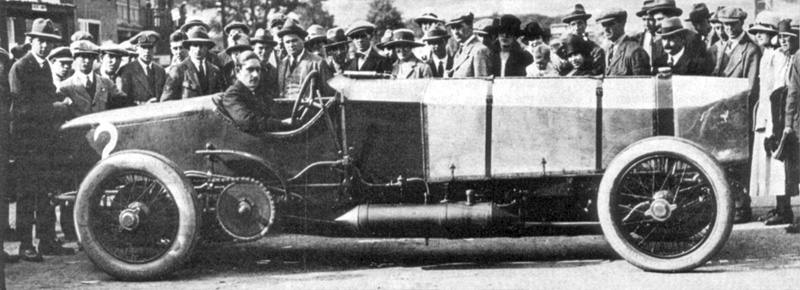
- Count Zborowski with Chitty 1 at Brooklands

Overview
- Production: 1921

Body and chassis
- Body style: Open-wheel car
- Layout: Front Engine, RWD

Powertrain
- Engine: 23,096 cubic centimetres (1,409.4 cu in) Maybach Mb.IVa I6
- Power output: 245 brake horsepower (183 kW) @ 3,000 rpm 850 newton-metres (630 lbf⋅ft) @ 2,100 rpm
- Transmission: 3-speed manual

Dimensions
- Curb weight: 2,200.0 kilograms (4,850.2 lb)

Chitty 1 was a chain-driven customised Mercedes chassis powered by a 23-litre 6-cylinder Maybach Mb.IVa aero engine. It won two races at its debut at Brooklands in 1921, coming second to another Zborowski car in a sprint race at the same event. Chitty 1 was fitted with four seats and a crude, oversized exhaust pipe, in order to mislead the handicappers and spectators. Its top speed on the day was 100.75 miles per hour (162.14 km/h).

For its next outing, Chitty 1 was refitted as a two-seater with a cowled radiator and a properly plumbed exhaust. It attained nearly 120 mph (190 km/h) on one occasion, and had its race handicap consistently reappraised. It subsequently crashed, removing three fingers from a timing official. The car was rebuilt and passed into the ownership of the sons of Arthur Conan Doyle, but was quickly retired as a racing car, and was later bought for spare parts by John Morris, the Maybach engine being offered to Bill Boddy, editor of Motor Sport magazine.

== Chitty 2 ==
Chitty 2

Overview
- Production: 1922
- Designer: Bligh Brothers

Body and chassis
- Body style: Open-wheel car
- Layout: Front Engine, RWD

Powertrain
- Engine: 18,825 cubic centimetres (1,148.8 cu in) Benz Bz.IV I6
- Power output: 228 brake horsepower (170 kW) @ 1,400 rpm 1,104 newton-metres (814 lbf⋅ft)
- Transmission: 3-speed manual

Dimensions
- Curb weight: 1,640 kilograms (3,620 lb)

Chitty 2 had a shorter wheelbase, an 18.8-litre Benz Bz.IV aero engine, and the coachwork was carried out by Bligh Brothers of Canterbury, England. It was never as successful as its predecessor, but took part in several road races, including a Sahara Desert expedition in 1922. It later became the property of the Crawford Auto-Aviation Museum in Cleveland, Ohio. Chitty 2 was part of Bob Bahre's private collection until his death in April 2020.

== Chitty 3 ==
Chitty 3

Overview
- Production: 1924

Body and chassis
- Body style: Open-wheel car
- Layout: Front engine, RWD

Powertrain
- Engine: 18,825 cubic centimetres (1,148.8 cu in) Benz Bz.IV I6
- Power output: 180 brake horsepower (130 kW); 1,000 newton-metres (740 lbf⋅ft)
- Transmission: 3-speed manual

Dimensions
- Curb weight: 1,555 kilograms (3,428 lb)

Chitty 3 was based on a modified Mercedes chassis with a 160 hp (120 kW) Mercedes single-overhead-camshaft six-cylinder aero engine, tuned to produce 180 hp (130 kW). The car recorded a lap of Brooklands at 112.68 mph (181.34 km/h). Louis Zborowski later used it as his personal transport, and drove it to Stuttgart when he negotiated to join the Mercedes racing team.

== Chitty 4 ==
Chitty 4
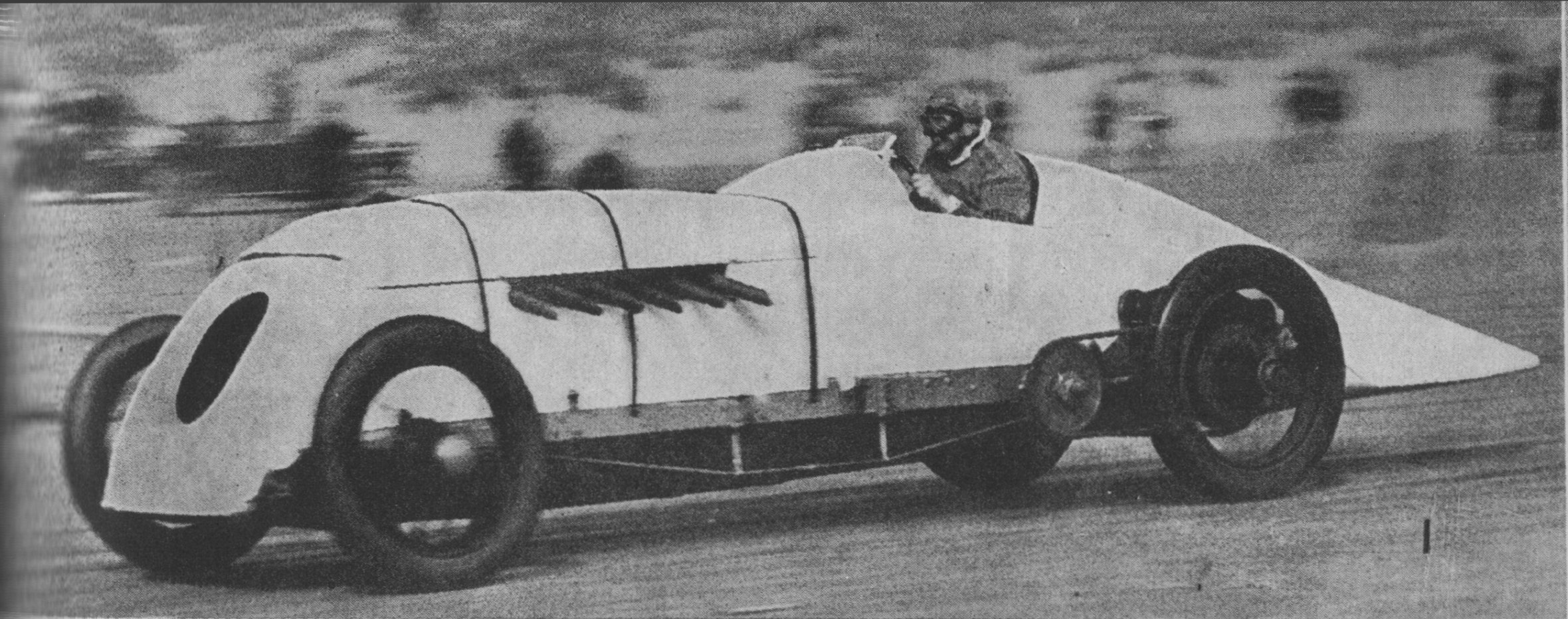

Overview
- Also called: Babs (land speed record car), Higham Special
- Production: 1926
- Designer: J. G. Parry-Thomas, originally Clive Gallop & Count Louis Zborowski

Body and chassis
- Body style: Open-wheel car
- Layout: Front Engine, RWD

Powertrain
- Engine: 27,020 cubic centimetres (1,649 cu in) Liberty L-12 V12
- Power output: 450 brake horsepower (340 kW); 2,000 newton-metres (1,500 lbf⋅ft)
- Transmission: 3-speed manual

Dimensions
- Curb weight: 1,483 kilograms (3,269 lb)

Chitty 4, also known as the Higham Special, had the largest engine of Louis Zborowski's cars, powered by a 450 hp (340 kW) V12 Liberty aero engine of 27 litres capacity, with a gearbox and chain-drive from a pre-war Blitzen Benz. Still not fully developed by the time of Zborowski's death in November 1924, it was purchased from his estate by J. G. Parry-Thomas for the sum of £125, equal to £9,005 today.

Parry-Thomas renamed the car Babs and rebuilt it with four Zenith carburettors and pistons of his own design. In April 1926, Parry-Thomas used the car to set the land speed record at 171.02 mph (273.6 km/h). He was killed in the vehicle in a later attempt on 3 March 1927.

The largest-capacity racing car ever to run at Brooklands, Babs was buried at Pendine Sands in Wales, but was recovered and restored in 1967, and remains on display at the Pendine Museum of Speed during the summer, and at Brooklands Museum during the winter.
