= Babs (car) =

Land speed record car (1926–27)

Chitty 4
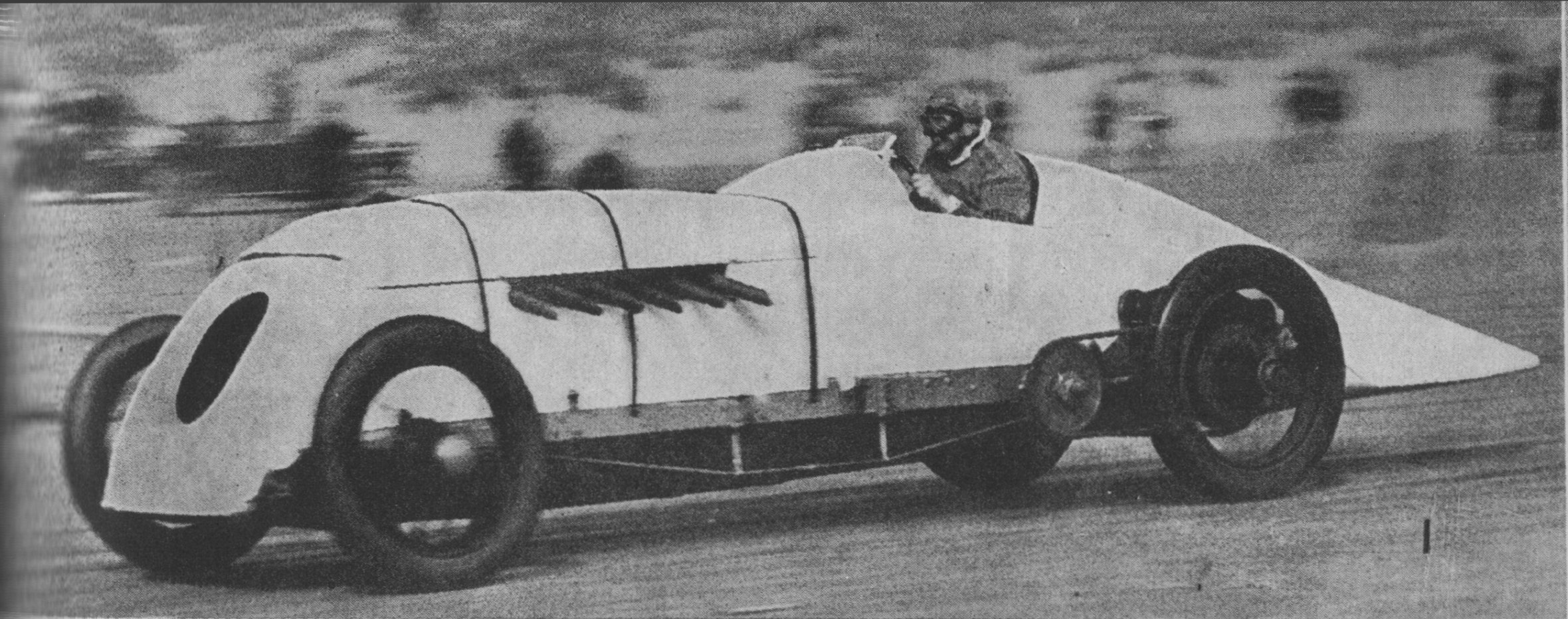

Overview
- Also called: Babs; Higham Special
- Production: 1926
- Designer: J. G. Parry-Thomas, originally Clive Gallop & Count Louis Zborowski

Body and chassis
- Body style: Open-wheel car
- Layout: Front Engine, RWD

Powertrain
- Engine: 27,020 cc (1,649 cu in) Liberty L-12 V12
- Power output: 450 bhp (340 kW); 2,000 N⋅m (1,500 lbf⋅ft)
- Transmission: 3-speed manual

Dimensions
- Kerb weight: 1,483 kg (3,269 lb)

Babs is the land speed record car built and driven by John Parry-Thomas. It was powered by a 27-litre Liberty L-12 aero-engine.

Babs began as 'Chitty 4', one of Count Louis Zborowski's series of aero-engined cars named 'Chitty Bang Bang'. As it was built at Zborowski's estate of Higham Park near Canterbury, it was also known as the Higham Special.

Using a 450 hp (340 kW) V12 Liberty aero engine of 27 litres capacity, with a gearbox and chain-drive from a pre-war Blitzen Benz, it was the largest capacity racing car ever to run at Brooklands. It was bodied by coach building firm Bligh Brothers. Still not fully developed by the time of Zborowski's death in 1924, it was purchased from his estate by John Parry-Thomas for the sum of £125.

Parry Thomas rechristened the car Babs and rebuilt it with four Zenith carburettors and his own design of pistons. In April 1926, Parry Thomas used the car to break the land speed record at 171.02 mph (275.23 km/h).

Babs used exposed chains (covered by a fairing) to take power to the drive wheels. It has been rumoured that the high engine cover required Parry Thomas to drive with his head tilted to one side. This story is not true; photographs show that the driver could see straight ahead.

During a later record attempt at Pendine Sands, Wales on 3 March 1927, the car went out of control at speeds in excess of 100 mph (160 km/h). The car rolled over and Parry Thomas was partially decapitated. Following the inquest into Thomas's death, Babs's seats were slashed, the glass in the dials smashed, and the car was buried in the sand dunes at Pendine.

At the time it was thought that a drive chain had snapped, decapitating the driver. Later investigation of the recovered wreckage suggested, instead, that a failure of the rear right-hand wheel may have caused the accident.

== Restoration ==
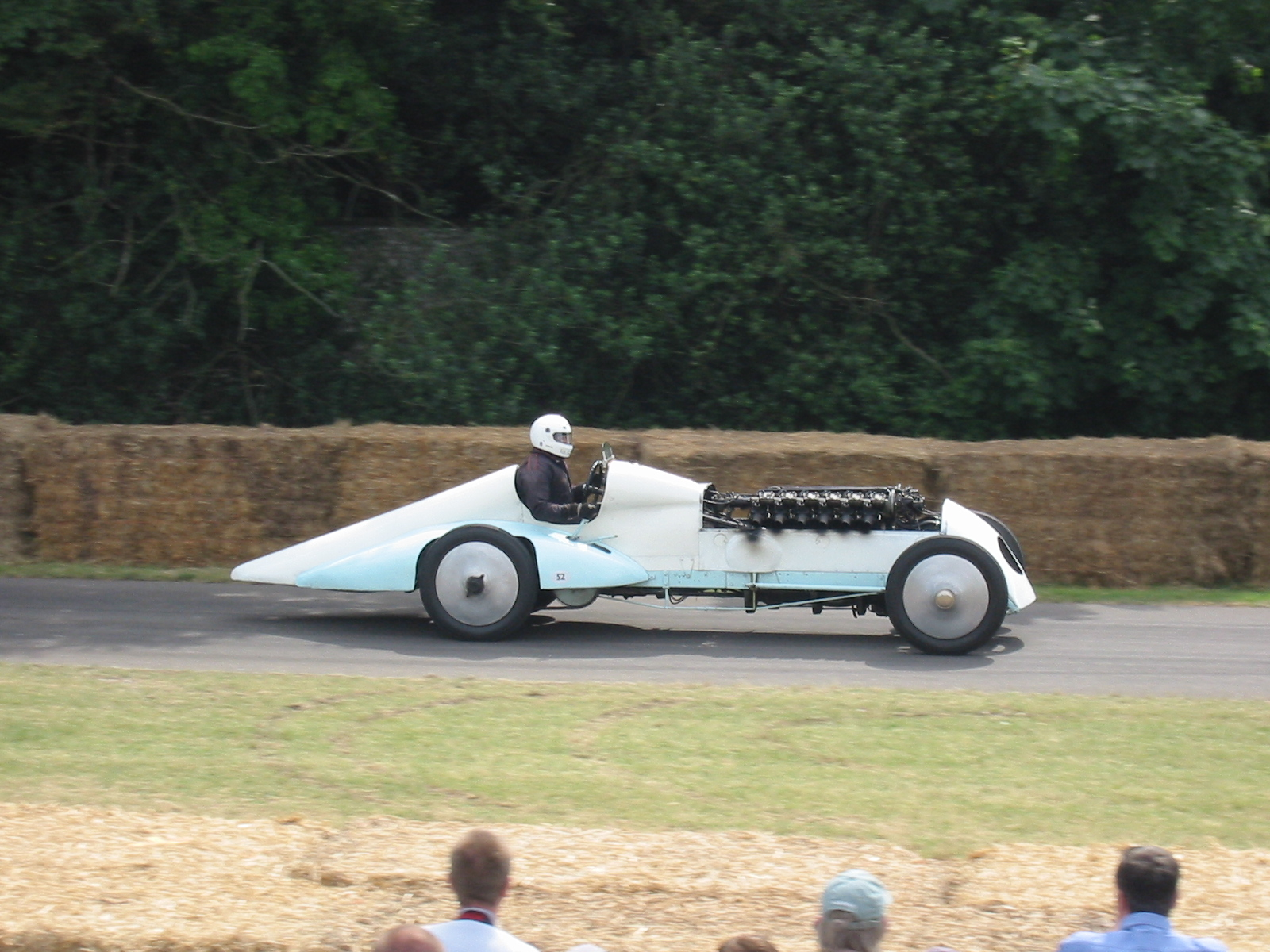
Restored, at Goodwood in 2005

In 1967, Owen Wyn Owen decided to excavate and restore Babs. The site of the burial was identified from old photographs, but it was found to be within the perimeter of the MoD Pendine military range. The military authorities granted permission for the excavation on condition that Parry-Thomas's next of kin did not object. It took Owen two years to locate a living relative, a nephew living in Walsall, and the wreck was then recovered. This recovery was controversial at the time, less so after the successful restoration. The prevailing opinion was that the wreck would be unsalvageable for anything more than a pitiful museum display. Few expected that the wreck would ever resemble a car again, let alone be restored to running order.

The car was in very poor condition. Much of the bodywork had corroded, so a new body had to be constructed, melding in where possible any existing original material. The mechanical running gear though was in good condition. Even where components could not be used, they were sufficiently preserved to act as a pattern. The engine was salvageable, but many new replacement parts had to be made from original designs.

The car was first successfully tested on The Helyg straight in the early 1970s. The test consisted of Babs being towed by the local garage owner's Land Rover (Dafydd Hughes and his mechanic Allan Hughes) to 60 miles per hour (97 km/h), and then bump-started. The gearing was so high that being towed was the only way to get Babs moving under its own power. The car was later successfully demonstrated in front of the world press and television on an airfield near RAF Valley, Anglesey.

The restoration work took place in Owen's garage in Capel Curig, and Babs since then was displayed in the Pendine Museum of Speed in the summer until its demolition in 2019. A replacement museum, the Museum of Land Speed, was opened at Pendine in 2022, and the car is displayed there for part of the year. and at Brooklands Museum during the winter. The car was run at the Brooklands Centenary in 2007.

In 1999, Owen was awarded the Tom Pryce trophy, engraved with the words Atgyfodwr Babs ('Resurrector of Babs'). Following Owen's death in 2012, the car is driven by his son Geraint.
