= Chitty-Chitty-Bang-Bang =

1964 children's story by Ian Fleming

Chitty-Chitty-Bang-Bang: The Magical Car
- The hardcover three volumes (first editions)
- Author: Ian Fleming
- Illustrator: John Burningham
- Genre: Children's literature
- Publisher: Jonathan Cape
- Publication date: 22 October 1964
- Publication place: United Kingdom
- Media type: Print (hardcover)
- Pages: 46 (Volume 1)
- Followed by: Chitty Chitty Bang Bang Flies Again (2011)

Chitty-Chitty-Bang-Bang: The Magical Car is a children's story written by Ian Fleming and illustrated by John Burningham. It was initially published in three volumes, the first of which was released on 22 October 1964 by Jonathan Cape, before being published as one book. The story concerns the exploits of Chitty-Chitty-Bang-Bang—a car with hidden powers and abilities—and its owners, the Pott family.

Fleming, better known as the creator of James Bond, took his inspiration for the subject from a series of aero-engined racing cars called "Chitty Bang Bang", built by Louis Zborowski in the early 1920s. Fleming wrote the book while convalescing after a major heart attack; he had created the story as a bedtime story for his son, Caspar. Although Fleming wanted The Daily Mail cartoonist Trog—the pseudonym of Wally Fawkes—as the book's illustrator, the newspaper did not allow him to work on the project, so Burningham was commissioned. Fleming did not live to see Chitty-Chitty-Bang-Bang published; he died of a heart attack on 12 August 1964 and the book was published two months later.

Chitty-Chitty-Bang-Bang was serialised in the Daily Express and adapted as a comic strip. The book was loosely adapted as a 1968 film of the same name with a screenplay by Roald Dahl and Ken Hughes; a subsequent novelisation was also published. The film was produced by Albert R. Broccoli, the co-producer of the James Bond film series. The story was also adapted as a stage musical under the same name. In April 2011 a BBC Radio 4 Extra adaptation was broadcast with Imogen Stubbs as the voice of Chitty. Three sequels to Fleming's book have been published, all written by Frank Cottrell-Boyce.

== Plot ==
Caractacus Pott, a former commander in the Royal Navy, invents sweets that can also be used as whistles, and sells the idea to Lord Skrumshus, the wealthy owner of a local confectionery factory. Pott uses the money to buy and renovate an old car, a "Paragon Panther"—the sole production of the Paragon motor-car company before it went bankrupt. It is a four-seat touring car with an enormous bonnet. After the restoration is complete, the car is named for the noises made by its starter motor and the characteristic two loud backfires it makes when it starts.

At first, Chitty-Chitty-Bang-Bang is just a big and powerful car, but as the book progresses it surprises Pott's family by beginning to exhibit independent actions. This first happens while the family is caught in a traffic jam on their way to the beach for a picnic. The car suddenly instructs Commander Pott to pull a switch which causes Chitty-Chitty-Bang-Bang to sprout wings and take flight over the stopped cars on the road. Commander Pott flies them to Goodwin Sands in the English Channel where the family picnics, swims and sleeps. While the family naps, the tide comes in and threatens to drown them. Chitty-Chitty-Bang-Bang wakes them just in time with a hiss of steam. At the car's direction, Commander Pott pulls another switch, which causes it to transform into a hovercraft-like vehicle. They make for the French coast and land on a beach near Calais. Exploring along the beach, they find a cave boobytrapped with some devices intended to scare off intruders. At the back of the cave is a store of armaments and explosives. The family detonates the cache of explosives and flees the cave.

The gang of gun-runners who own the ammunition dump arrive and block the road in front of Chitty-Chitty-Bang-Bang. The gangsters threaten the family, but Commander Pott throws the switch, which transforms the car into an aeroplane. They take off, leaving the gangsters in helpless fury. The Potts stay overnight in a hotel in Calais. While the family sleeps, the gangsters break into the children's room and kidnap them and drive off towards Paris. Chitty-Chitty-Bang-Bang tracks the gangsters' route, wakes Commander and Mrs Pott, and they drive off in pursuit.

The gangsters are planning to rob a famous chocolate shop in Paris using the children as decoys. The Pott children overhear this and manage to warn the shop owner, Monsieur Bon-Bon. Chitty-Chitty-Bang-Bang arrives in time to prevent the gangsters from fleeing. The police arrive and the gangsters are taken away. As a reward, Madame Bon-Bon shares the secret recipe of her fudge with the Potts, and the two families become good friends. Chitty-Chitty-Bang-Bang flies the family away to parts unknown, and the book implies that the car has yet more secrets.

== Background and writing history ==
By March 1961 Ian Fleming had written nine books at the rate of one a year: eight novels and a collection of short stories, all featuring the character James Bond. (Note: The books were Casino Royale (1953), Live and Let Die (1954), Moonraker (1955), Diamonds Are Forever (1956), From Russia, with Love (1957), Dr. No (1958), Goldfinger (1959) Thunderball (1961); the short story collection was For Your Eyes Only (1960).) The most recent of these was Thunderball, a novel Fleming wrote in early 1960. It was based on the screenplay he wrote with the screenwriter Jack Whittingham and the writer and director, Kevin McClory. Legal difficulties before publication led to a hearing at the High Court in London on 24 March 1961, putting great strain on Fleming. Two weeks after the case, during the weekly Tuesday staff conference at his employers, The Sunday Times, Fleming suffered a major heart attack.

The attack was severe enough to necessitate hospitalisation, after which Fleming convalesced at the Dudley Hotel in Hove. While he was recuperating, one of his friends—probably Sir George Duff-Sutherland-Dunbar, according to Fleming's biographer Andrew Lycett—gave him a copy of Beatrix Potter's The Tale of Squirrel Nutkin to read, and suggested Fleming write up the bedtime story he used to tell his son Caspar each evening. Fleming disliked the book, but enjoyed the illustrations. He had been forbidden access to a typewriter, in case the strain of writing a new Bond novel was too much for him, and he asked for a pen and paper and wrote the story by hand. He attacked the project with gusto and wrote to his publisher, Michael Howard of Jonathan Cape, joking that "There is not a moment, even on the edge of the tomb, when I am not slaving for you". Just over a month after his heart attack he sent Howard the drafts of the first two stories. The working title for the book was The Magical Car, which may have been in place until about six months before it was published. Fleming considered the idea of publishing the book under the pseudonym "Ian Lancaster" (his first two names), but Howard counselled against it and he agreed.

Fleming did not live to see Chitty-Chitty-Bang-Bang published; he suffered a further heart attack on 11 August 1964 and died in the early morning of the following day—his son Caspar's twelfth birthday—in Canterbury, Kent. The book was published two months after his death.

== Inspirations ==
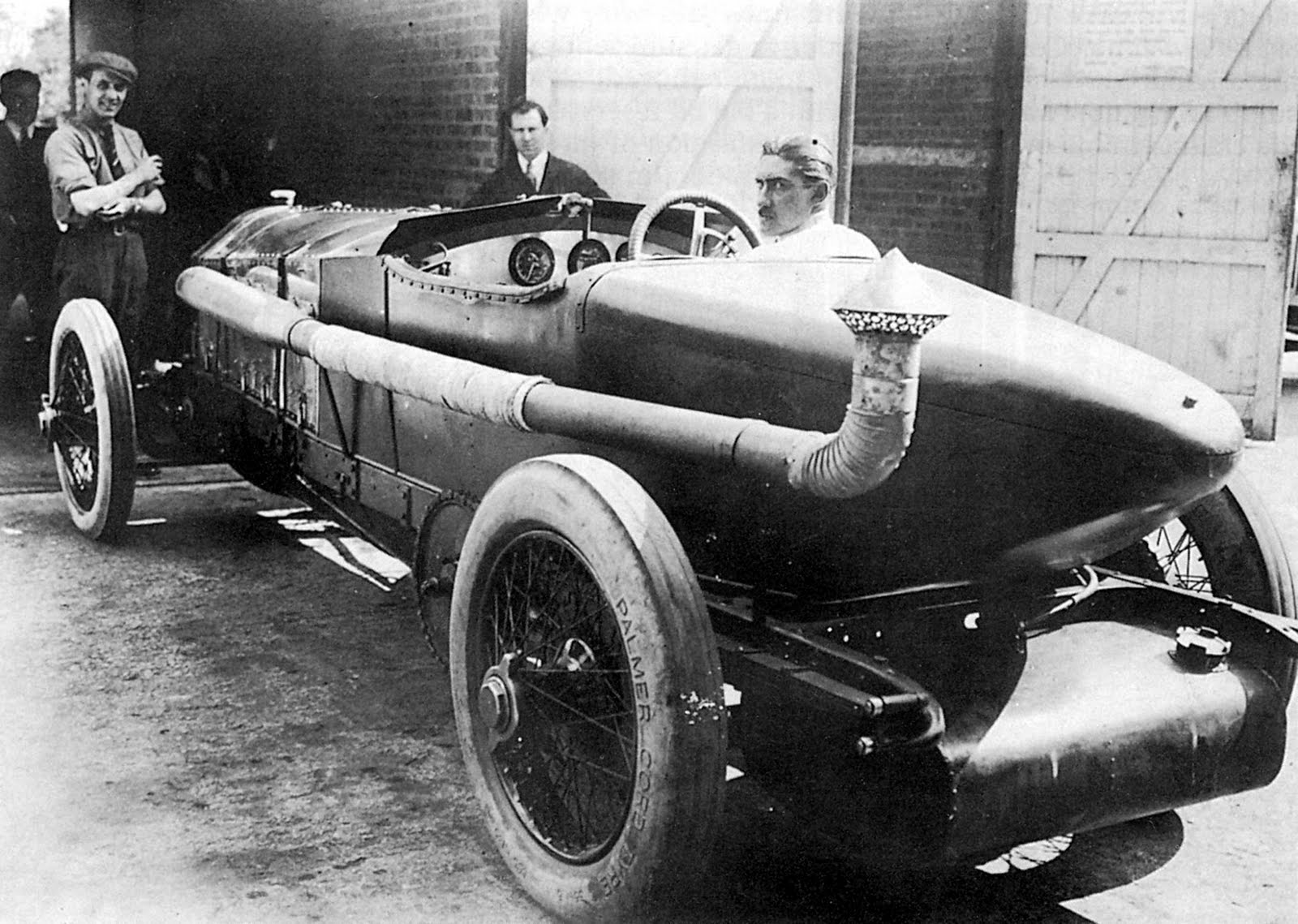
Louis Zborowski in the driving seat of "Chitty Bang Bang 1"

As he wrote Chitty-Chitty-Bang-Bang, Fleming used aspects of his life to flesh out the details, much as he did with many of his Bond stories. Thus, in the book, one of the children was called Jemima, after the daughter of his previous employer, Hugo Pitman. The advice Pott gave to his children—"Never say 'no' to adventure. Always say 'yes', otherwise you'll lead a very dull life"—is an echo of Fleming's outlook. Pott's naval rank was commander, which was also that held by Fleming during the Second World War; Fleming used the rank for James Bond and James Gunn, an unrealised television series he wrote in 1956.

The car Chitty-Chitty-Bang-Bang was based on a composite of two vehicles: Fleming's own Standard Tourer, which he had driven in Switzerland in the late 1920s, and Chitty Bang Bang, a chain-driven customised Mercedes with an eight-foot-long (two-point-four-metre) bonnet and a twenty-three-litre, six-cylinder aero-engine from Maybach. The engine was of the type used on First World War Zeppelins. Fleming had seen the car's owner, Louis Zborowski, race at the Brooklands race track. The origin of the name "Chitty Bang Bang" is disputed, but may have been inspired by early aeronautical engineer Letitia Chitty. An obscene song from the First World War may also be connected to the name; this referred to the "chits", or passes, given to officers to visit the bordellos of Paris. The bibliographer Jon Gilbert suggests that when Fleming was at Eton, there were two brothers called Chitty, the sons of one of the schoolmasters, the Reverend George Jameson Chitty, and it is possible that they are the origin of the name. Fleming had a long-held passion for cars, owning several over his life and reading avidly on the subject. The sound a car made was "almost as important as the appearance" to Fleming, according to Henry Chancellor, who has written for Ian Fleming Publications.

== Illustrations ==
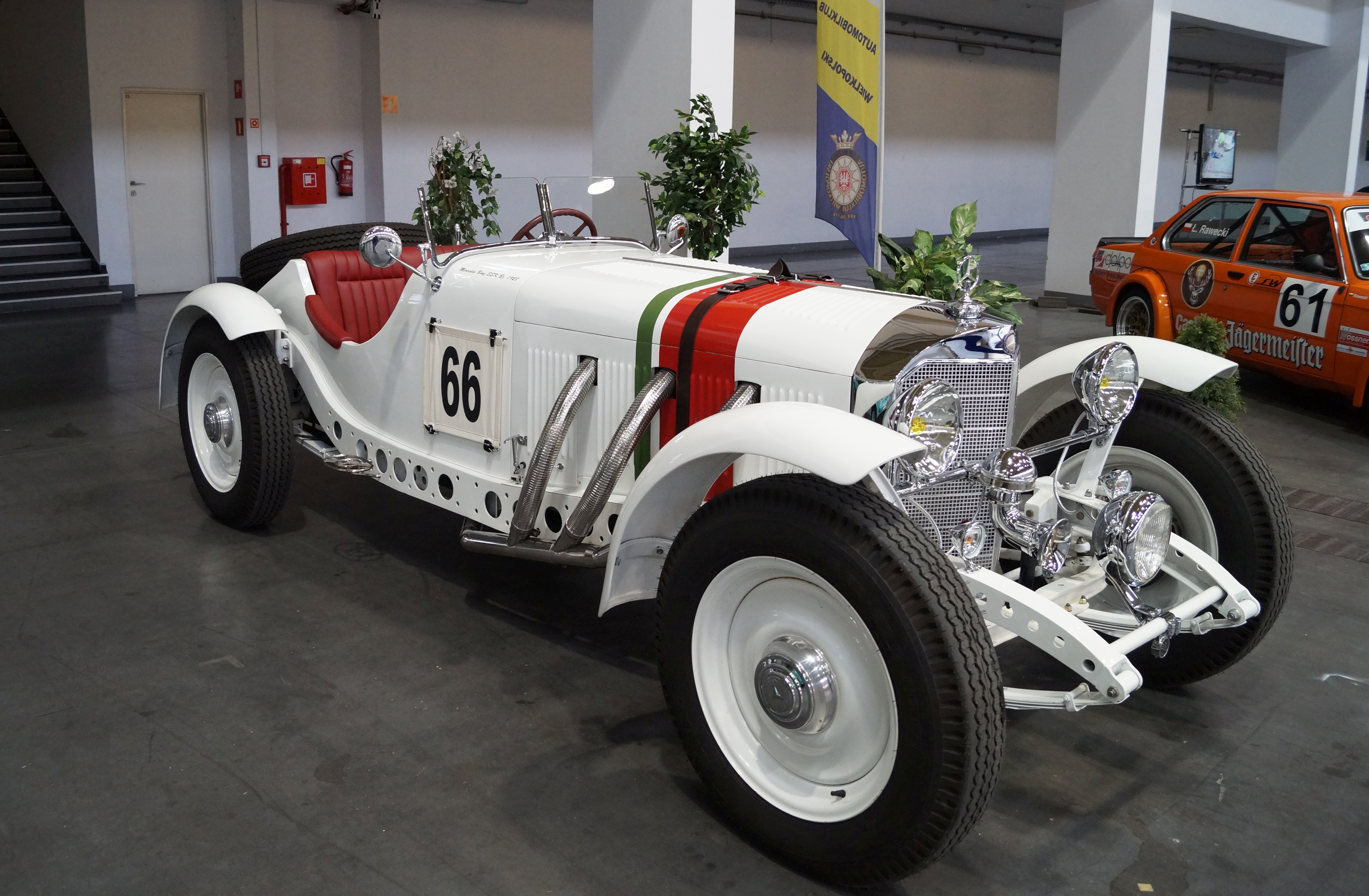
The Mercedes-Benz SSK, a car similar to that drawn by Amherst Villiers

When Fleming sent his publisher the manuscripts for the first two volumes of Chitty-Chitty-Bang-Bang in May 1961, he suggested The Daily Mail cartoonist Trog—the pseudonym of Wally Fawkes—as the book's illustrator. Fleming was an admirer of Trog's work and considered him a friend, describing him as "an extremely nice man and great fun". Although Trog completed preliminary drawings for the project, The Daily Mail refused to allow him to complete the work as many of Fleming's works were serialised in its rival, the Daily Express. While undertaking his preliminary drawings, Trog tried to make the fudge recipe included in the book and found it was not particularly good: the editors at Jonathan Cape spent a day making up batches from different recipes to find a better one to use.

Cape then asked the illustrator Haro Hodson if he would like to work on the book. He produced some trial sketches, but Fleming rejected them as not being suitable. Fleming asked his friend Amherst Villiers if he would be able to come up with a design for the car which was "really snazzy looking to excite the imagination of children about 7–10". He explained that the publishers "have got one or two artists lined up for the figures, landscapes, etc, they can't find anybody with enough technical know-how and imagination to draw a suitable Chitty-Chitty-Bang-Bang". Villiers was an engineer and engine designer who had provided Fleming with the technical details he used for Bond's cars in the novels; he also painted Fleming's portrait in 1962. According to Fleming's biographer, Andrew Lycett, Villiers's sketch was of "a low green rakish car, which looked like an SSK Mercedes with a round Delauney Belleville radiator".

Cape then commissioned John Burningham, who had recently won the 1963 Kate Greenaway Medal for his book Borka: The Adventures of a Goose with No Feathers. Burningham followed Fleming's instructions carefully and, although Villiers's drawings were not used, Burningham's illustrations of the car "bear a striking resemblance to Amherst's coloured drawings", according to Paul Kenny, Villiers's biographer.

== Release and reception ==
=== Publication history ===
Chitty-Chitty-Bang-Bang: The Magical Car was first published in the UK in three hard-backed volumes by Jonathan Cape, each costing 10s 6d. (Note: 10s 6d equates to approximately £9 in 2025, according to calculations based on the Consumer Price Index measure of inflation.) The first volume was launched on 22 October 1964, the second on 26 November 1964 and the third on 14 January 1965. Each volume was 48 pages. In July 1968 the three volumes were released in one single 123-page volume by Pan Books under the name Chitty-Chitty-Bang-Bang: The Complete Adventures of the Magical Car. Later editions and paperback versions used only the shortened name Chitty-Chitty-Bang-Bang. Since its initial publication the book has been re-issued in hardback and paperback editions and, as at 2024, has never been out of print.

The book was published in the US in 1964 by Random House. Rather than publishing in three volumes, the stories were produced in one volume, which meant American readers were able to read the third part of the story before British readers. In May 1965, Chitty-Chitty-Bang-Bang was third in The New York Times's list of best-selling books for children; by November that year, it was second.

=== Critical reception ===
Alexander Muir, in the Daily Mirror, considered that the first two volumes of Chitty-Chitty-Bang-Bang would be excellent Christmas presents for younger readers, although John Rowe Townsend, writing in The Guardian, suggested that a father, rather than the child, would be a better recipient of the present. The unnamed reviewer for The Birmingham Post thought the book would be enjoyed by both the children and their parents.

Both Oscar Turnill, writing for The Sunday Times, and Townsend described Fleming's writing as avuncular, although Townsend was being critical, saying that "we have the adult writer at play rather than the children's writer at work. The style is avuncular, the writing down too evident." Turnill, however, praised the good-humoured nature of Fleming's storytelling. The Birmingham Post commended Fleming's writing, stating he "proves himself already an accomplished, unpatronising story-teller for ... the 5–12-year-olds".

Turnill thought the writer "was right in judging the children's market ripe for the ... cliff-hanger"; Muir also praised the "thrilling cliff-hanger" nature of the book. The reviewer for The Times drew parallels with Fleming's other work, and noted that the book would be an excellent choice for younger readers before they started on a Bond novel. The author Richard Usborne, writing for The Daily Telegraph, also reviewed Chitty-Chitty-Bang-Bang in the light of the James Bond novels, and wrote:

These CCBB stories are highly professional in the field of children's books. The odd items of information, the super wicked villains, the hairsbreadth escapes, the happy family security, the magic, the happy endings, with the comforting assurance that family and car will soon be in mortal danger again. That's the stuff to give the infantry!

== Adaptations ==
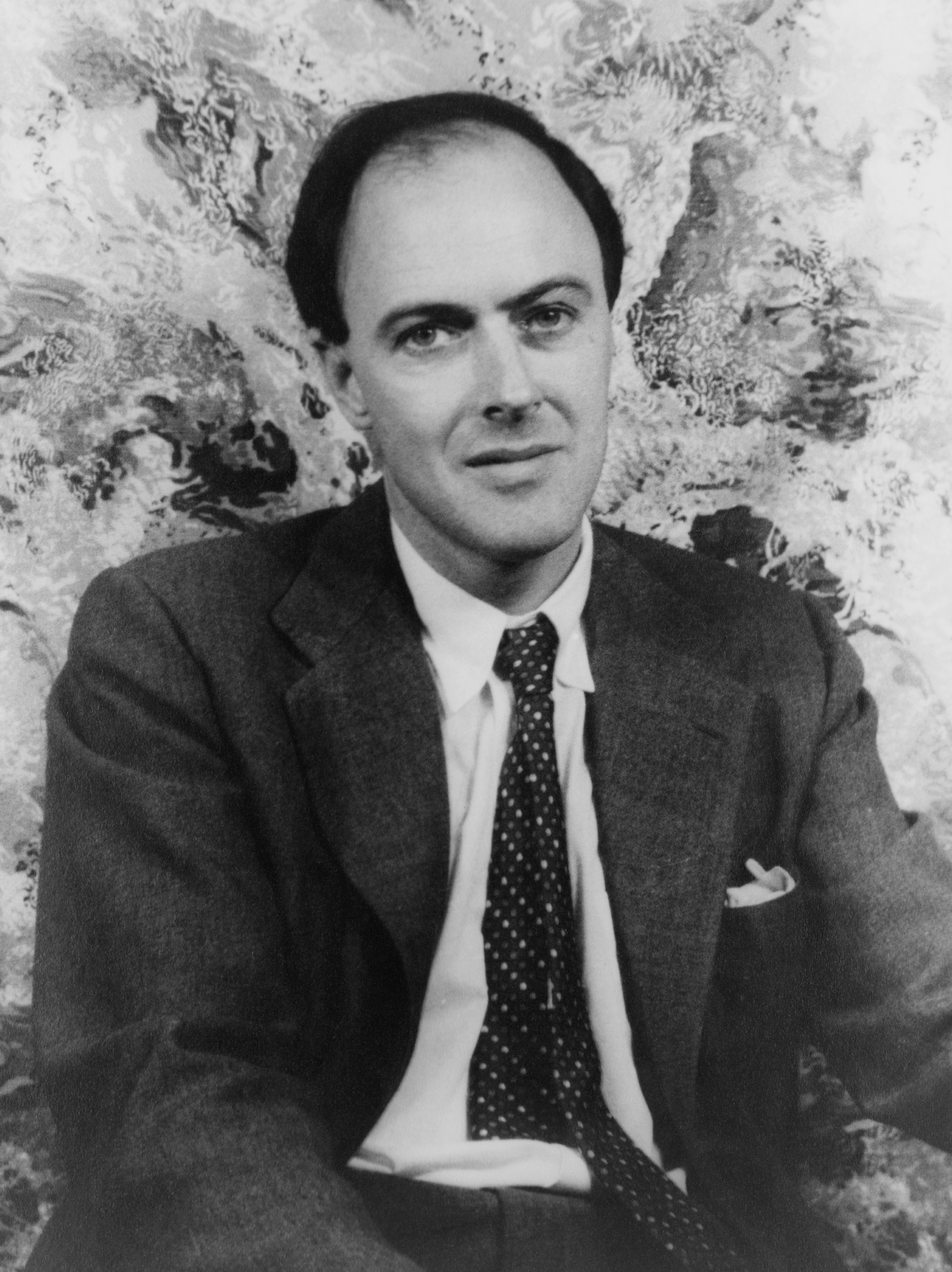
Roald Dahl, one of the screenwriters for the film Chitty Chitty Bang Bang

Chitty-Chitty-Bang-Bang was serialised in the Daily Express newspaper in five episodes over the course of a week, from 19 to 23 October 1964. In 1969 a strip cartoon version was issued in the UK under the title Chitty-Chitty-Bang-Bang: Authorised Edition.

A musical film loosely based on the book was made in 1968, with a screenplay written by Roald Dahl and Ken Hughes; Hughes also directed. It was produced by Albert R. "Cubby" Broccoli, who had made five James Bond films to that point. A novelisation of the film was published by Pan Books in 1968, written by the author John Burke. In December 2024 it was reported that a remake of the film was in early development, to be produced by Amazon MGM Studios and Eon Productions. Matthew Warchus was announced as the director with Enda Walsh as the screenwriter.

In April 2002 Chitty Chitty Bang Bang, a stage musical based on the film, opened at the London Palladium theatre, starring Michael Ball. It closed in September 2005. It was the longest-running show ever at the London Palladium, taking over £70 million in its three-and-a-half-year run. A Broadway version ran at the Hilton Theatre, New York, between March and December 2005, with 34 previews and 285 regular performances.

A one-hour adaptation of the story by Sherry Ashworth was broadcast on BBC Radio 4 Extra on 3 April 2011, starring Imogen Stubbs as the voice of Chitty and Alex Jennings as Caractacus Pott.

Three sequels to the book have been written by Frank Cottrell-Boyce. The first—Chitty Chitty Bang Bang Flies Again—was published in October 2011. The second, Chitty Chitty Bang Bang and the Race Against Time, was released in September 2012. A third sequel, Chitty Chitty Bang Bang Over the Moon, was released in September 2013.

== Notes and references ==
=== Sources ===
==== Books ====
- Benson, Raymond (1988). The James Bond Bedside Companion. London: Boxtree. ISBN 978-1-8528-3233-9.
- Chancellor, Henry (2005). James Bond: The Man and His World. London: John Murray. ISBN 978-0-7195-6815-2.
- Druce, Robert (1992). This Day our Daily Fictions: An Enquiry into the Multi-Million Bestseller Status of Enid Blyton and Ian Fleming. Amsterdam: Rodopi. ISBN 978-9-0518-3401-7.
- Fleming, Fergus (2015). The Man with the Golden Typewriter: Ian Fleming's James Bond Letters. New York: Bloomsbury. ISBN 978-1-6328-6489-5.
- Fleming, Ian (1964a). Chitty-Chitty-Bang-Bang: The Magical Car. New York: Random House. OCLC 175241.
- Gilbert, Jon (2012). Ian Fleming: The Bibliography. London: Queen Anne Press. ISBN 978-0-9558-1896-7.
- Kenny, Paul (2009). The Man who Supercharged Bond: The Extraordinary Story of Charles Amherst Villiers. Newbury Park, California: Haynes Publishing. ISBN 978-1-8442-5468-2.
- Lycett, Andrew (1996). Ian Fleming. London: Phoenix. ISBN 978-1-8579-9783-5.
- Macintyre, Ben (2008). For Your Eyes Only. London: Bloomsbury Publishing. ISBN 978-0-7475-9527-4.
- Parker, Matthew (2014). Goldeneye: Where Bond Was Born: Ian Fleming's Jamaica. London: Hutchinson. ISBN 978-0-0919-5410-9.
- Pearson, John (1967). The Life of Ian Fleming: Creator of James Bond. London: Pan Books. OCLC 669702874.

==== News ====
- "Children's Best Sellers". The New York Times. 9 May 1965. p. BRA38.
- "Children's Best Sellers". The New York Times. 7 November 1965. p. BRA48.
- "Chitty-Chitty-Bang-Bang". The Daily Express. 24 October 1964. p. 10.
- Fleming, Ian (19 October 1964b). "Chitty-Chitty-Bang-Bang". The Daily Express. p. 9.
- Fleming, Ian (23 October 1964c). "Chitty-Chitty-Bang-Bang". The Daily Express. p. 9.
- "For All Sorts of Children". The Times. 10 December 1964. p. 17.
- "High Court of Justice". The Times. 25 March 1961. p. 12.
- Muir, Alexander (15 December 1964). "Bright Ideas for Santa". The Daily Mirror. p. 17.
- Taylor, Judy (5 June 1964). "Internationalism in Children's Books". The Guardian. p. 15.
- Townsend, John Rowe (4 December 1964). "A New Mayne and a Mini Bond". The Guardian. p. 9.
- Turnill, Oscar (25 October 1964). "Overdrive Plus". The Sunday Times. p. 47.
- Usborne, Richard (23 October 1964). "James Bond for the Children?". The Daily Telegraph. p. 46.
- "Vintage Fleming". The Birmingham Post. 24 October 1964. p. 16.

==== Websites ====
- "Broccoli, Albert R. (1909–1996)". Screenonline. British Film Institute. Archived from the original on 8 August 2012.
- "Chitty Chitty Bang Bang". BBC Radio. Archived from the original on 9 April 2023.
- "Chitty Chitty Bang Bang". Internet Broadway Database. Archived from the original on 26 May 2024.
- "Chitty Chitty Bang Bang 3: Over the Moon". Pan Macmillan. Archived from the original on 14 October 2013.
- "Chitty Chitty Bang Bang Books". Ian Fleming Publications. Archived from the original on 4 March 2016.
- "Chitty Chitty Bang Bang the Musical". Eon Productions. Archived from the original on 8 December 2009.
- Clark, Gregory (2023). "The Annual RPI and Average Earnings for Britain, 1209 to Present (New Series)". MeasuringWorth. Archived from the original on 1 April 2023.
- "Credits: Chitty Chitty Bang Bang". BFI Film & TV Database. British Film Institute. Archived from the original on 22 January 2009.
- Gilbert, Jon (14 July 2016). "How Chitty came to be". Ian Fleming Publications. Archived from the original on 25 March 2023.
- "Ian Fleming's James Bond Titles". Ian Fleming Publications. Archived from the original on 10 August 2015.
- Jackson, Angelique (20 December 2024). "'Matilda the Musical' Director Matthew Warchus Boards 'Chitty Chitty Bang Bang' Remake From Amazon MGM, Eon". Variety.
- Lee, Benjamin (12 December 2024). "Chitty Chitty Bang Bang Remake in the Works". The Guardian.
