= Louis Zborowski =

British racing driver (1895–1924)

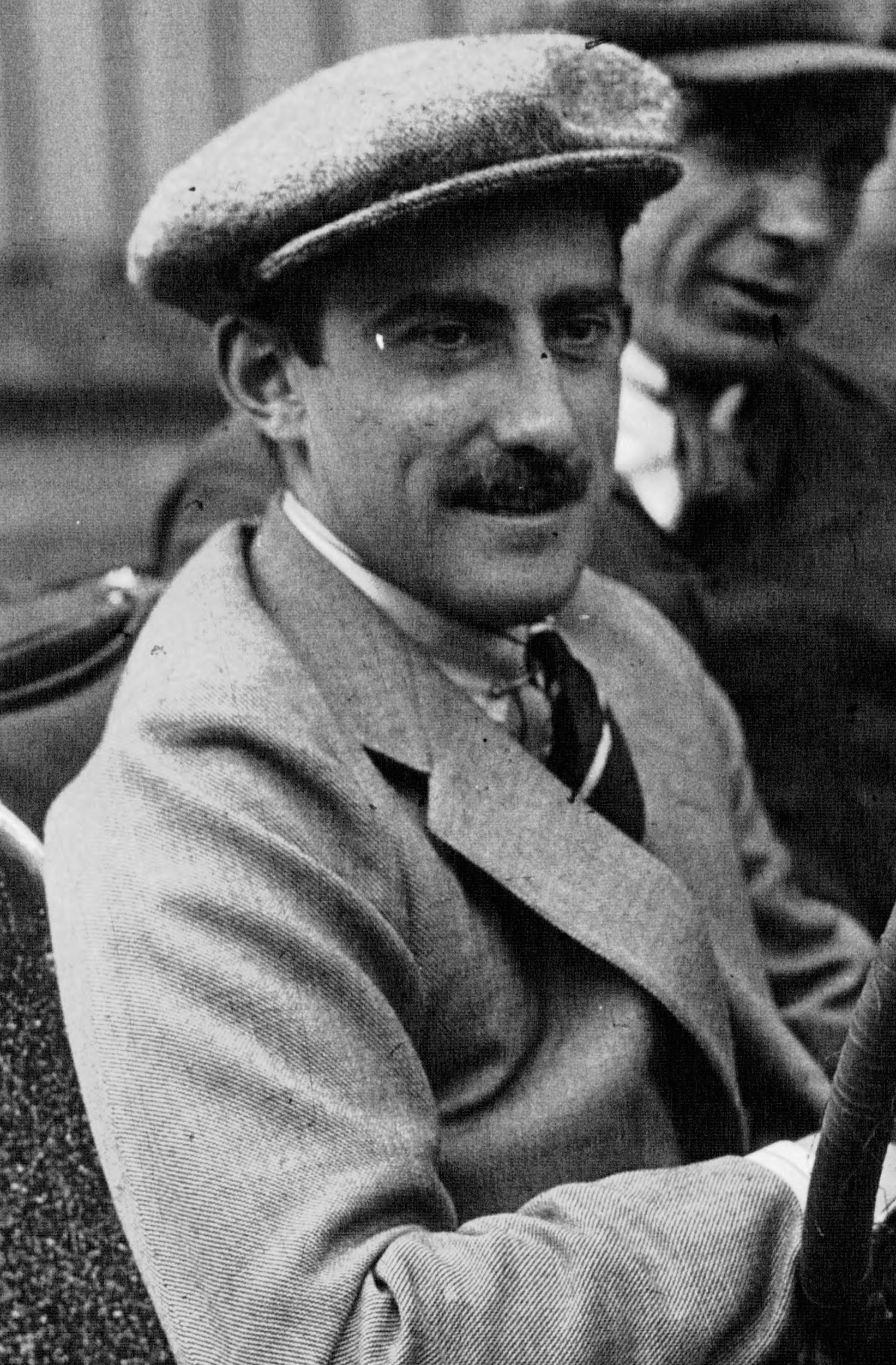
- Zborowski at the 1922 French Grand Prix
- Born: Louis Vorow Zborowski; 20 February 1895 Mayfair, London, England
- Died: 19 October 1924 (aged 29) Monza, Lombardy, Italy

Champ Car career
- 1 race run over 1 year
- First race: 1923 Indianapolis 500 (Indianapolis)
Wins	Podiums	Poles
0	0	0

Louis Vorow Zborowski (20 February 1895 – 19 October 1924) was a British racing driver and automobile engineer, best known for creating a series of aero-engined racing cars known as the "Chitty-Bang-Bangs", which provided the inspiration for Ian Fleming's children's story, Chitty Chitty Bang Bang and culminated in the "Higham Special" which, much modified in the hands of John Godfrey Parry Thomas, broke the World Land Speed Record 18 months after the death of its creator.

== Background ==
Zborowski was born in 1895 in London to American parents, who had moved to England nine years earlier. His father, Elliott Zborowski, was also a racing driver, and died in a racing crash, in 1903 at La Turbie Hillclimb in Nice, France. His mother was a wealthy American heiress, born Margaret Laura Astor Carey, a granddaughter of William Backhouse Astor Sr. and Margaret Rebecca Armstrong of the prominent Astor family. She had been Madame de Stuers before her divorce and marriage in 1892 to Elliott Zborowski. On arriving in England, Elliott had styled himself with the title "Count" and was known generally as "Count Zborowski", although there is no firm evidence that he had any legitimate claim to any such title. Following Elliott's death, Louis assumed his father's fictitious title.

== Early life ==
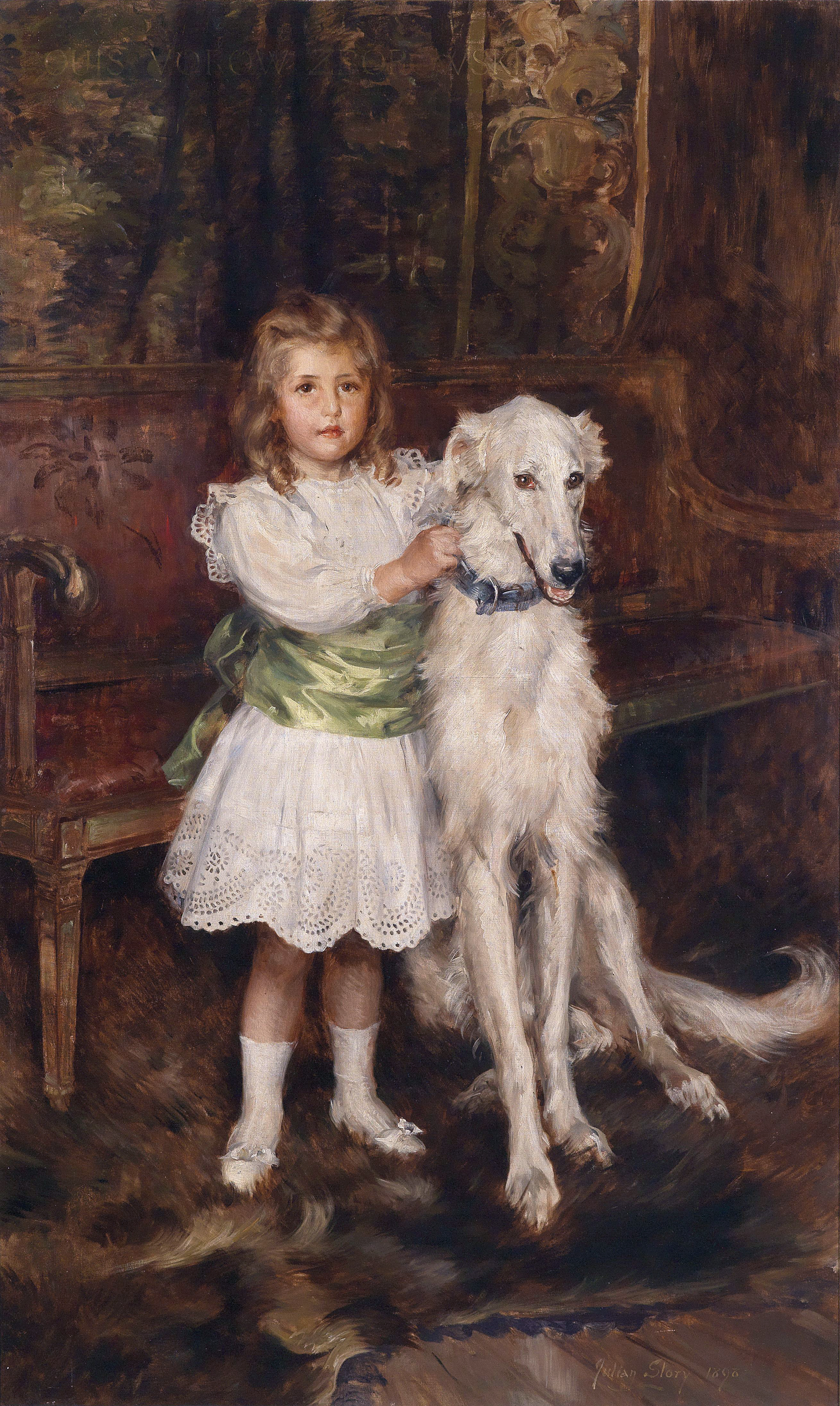
Louis Zborowski as child (Julian Russell Story, 1898)

After the death of Zborowski's father in 1903, in 1910, his mother bought the Higham Park estate at Bridge near Canterbury in Kent. Paying £17,500 to the executors of the estate of London banker William Gay, the sale included a farm, 225 acres (91 ha) and twelve houses. Mrs. Zborowski immediately commissioned a £50,000 refurbishment of the house from the architect Joseph Sawyer.

Upon her death in 1911, 16-year-old Zborowski became the fourth richest under-21-year-old in the world, with cash of £11 million and real estate in the United States, including 7 acres (2.8 ha) of Manhattan and several blocks on Fifth Avenue, New York.

== Early driving career ==
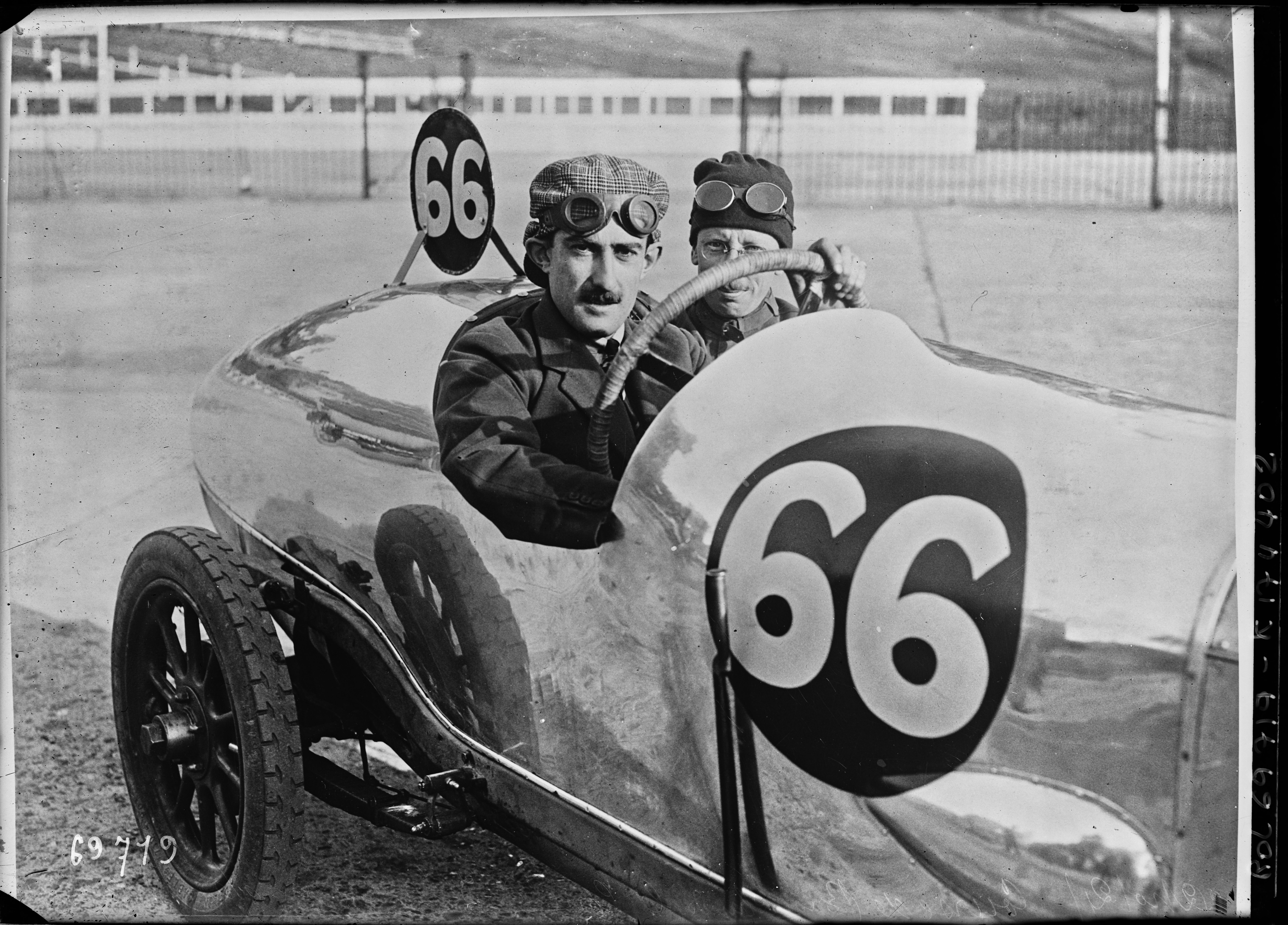
Zborowski and Clive Gallop in a 1,5-litre Aston Martin at the first JCC 200 Mile race at Brooklands on 22 October 1921, they ended in 10th place.

Zborowski's career as an amateur racing driver encompassed a wide experience of marques and events. He was an early patron of Aston Martin, and raced for them at Brooklands and in the 1922 French Grand Prix. In 1921, Zborowski was to drive one of the 1921 Grand Prix Sunbeams representing Britain at Le Mans but this did not transpire and instead he raced the car at the International Shelsley Walsh - England’s foremost Speed Hill-Climb.

== Car designs ==
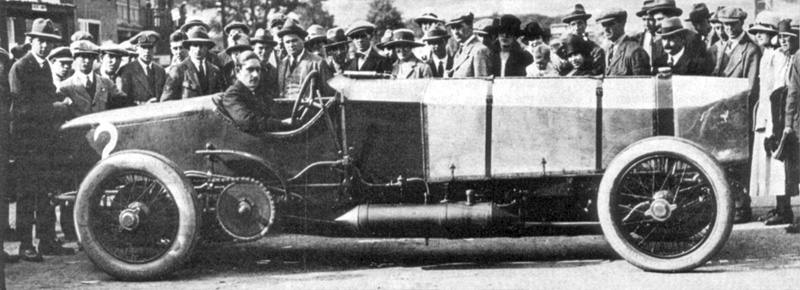
Louis Zborowski in the driving seat of Chitty Bang Bang 1 at Brooklands

Zborowski designed and built four of his own racing cars in the stables at Higham Park and workshops in Canterbury, assisted by his engineer and co-driver Captain Clive Gallop, who was later racing engineer to the "Bentley Boys".

While Gallop provided technical expertise for the chassis and mechanical elements, Zborowski turned to Bligh Brothers of Canterbury (a century-old local coachbuilding firm) to provide the bespoke coach work for these projects. He eventually acquired this business outright in order to retain a personal staff of coachbuilders.

The first car was powered by a 23,093 cc six-cylinder Maybach aero engine and called "Chitty Bang Bang". A second "Chitty Bang Bang" was powered by 18,825 cc Benz aero engine. A third car was based on a Mercedes 28/95, but fitted with a 14,778 cc 6-cylinder Mercedes aero engine and was referred to as the White Mercedes. These cars achieved some success at Brooklands.

Another car, also built at Higham Park with a huge 27-litre American Liberty aero engine, was called the "Higham Special". After Zborowski's death the "Higham Special" was purchased by J.G. Parry-Thomas to make bids on the land speed record. Designer/driver Thomas improved the car and christened her "Babs". In April 1926 J.G. Parry-Thomas successfully took the Land Speed Record at over 170 mph at Pendine Sands. Thomas' second attempt at the same location in 1927 turned out fatal. At over 100 mph the car overturned and caught fire, killing the driver. "Babs" has been restored and can be seen either at the Pendine Sands museum of speed in the summer months or in the Brooklands Museum during other months of the year.

In January 1922, Zborowski, his wife Vi, Clive Gallop and Pixi Marix together with a couple of mechanics took Chitty Bang Bang 2 and the White Mercedes across the Mediterranean for a drive into the Sahara Desert, in the tracks of Citroën's Kégresse-track-equipped expedition.

== Later career and death ==
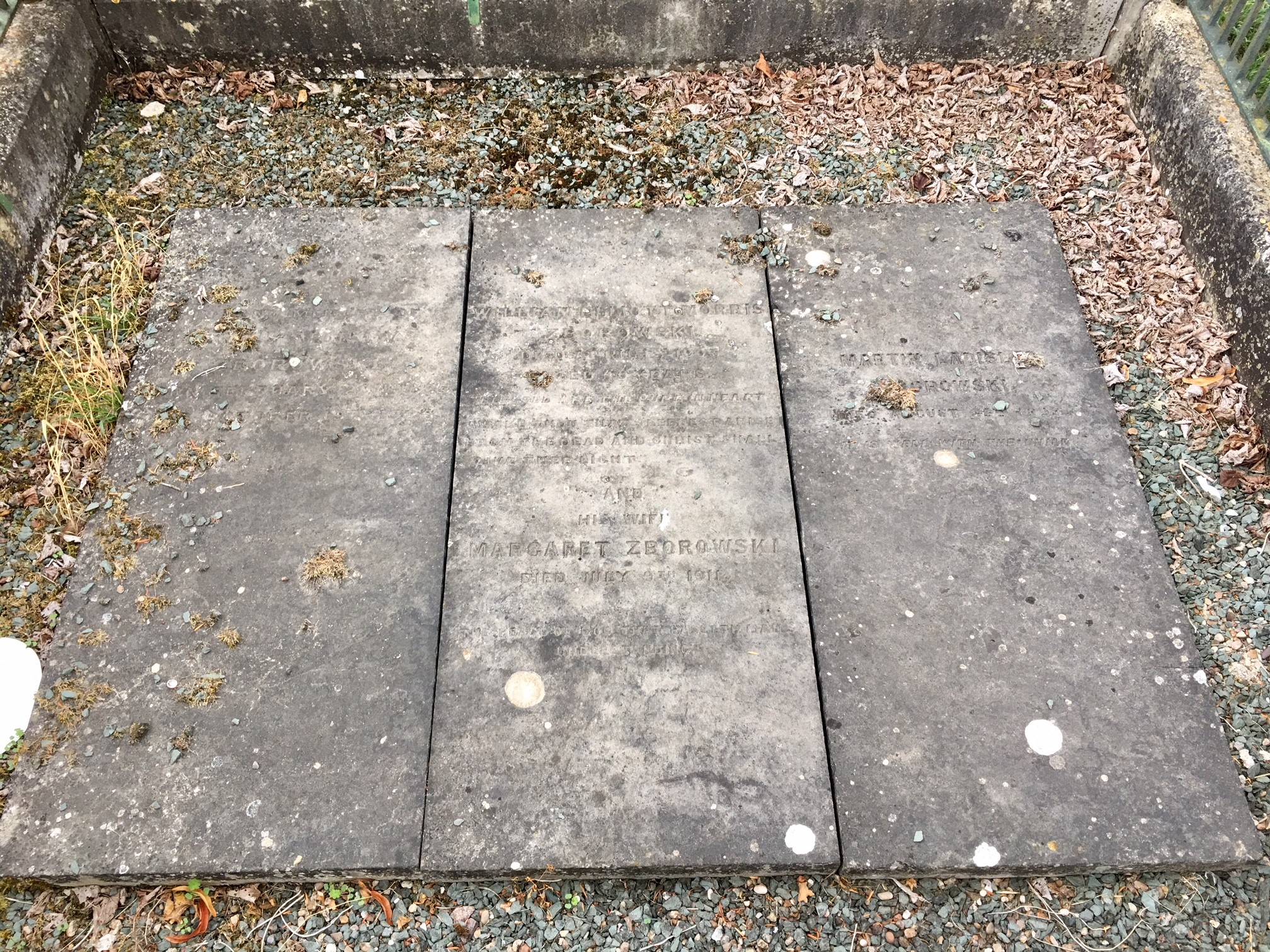
The grave of Louis Zborowski in the churchyard of St James, Burton Lazars

In the 1923 Indianapolis 500, Zborowski drove a Bugatti. He drove in the 1923 Italian Grand Prix at Monza in a car designed by American engineer Harry Miller, the single-seat "American Miller 122".

Zborowski joined the Mercedes team in 1924. He died in one of their cars while competing at the 1924 Italian Grand Prix at Monza, after his car skidded on a curve and turned over twice.

== Legacy ==
Zborowski was a railway enthusiast and a 15 in (381 mm) gauge railway circuit, the Higham Railway, was built around his estate in Kent. This line was part of the inspiration behind the joint decision by Zborowski and his racing friend Captain J. E. P. Howey to construct a long-distance passenger-carrying railway line in the same gauge. Many locations were investigated, but this eventually led to the founding of the 14-mile (23 km) long Romney, Hythe and Dymchurch Railway in Kent, which remains a popular tourist attraction and means of local transport. Zborowski ordered a steam locomotive from Bassett-Lowke, which ran on the Higham Railway in 1924. The locomotive was purchased by the Fairbourne Railway in Wales following Zborowski's death and named "Count Louis" in his honour. (Zborowski's father had claimed the title of count.) The locomotive remained at Fairbourne until 1988. Zborowski also ordered the first locomotives for the Romney, Hythe and Dymchurch Railway from Davey Paxman & Co. of Essex. The order (and the project) was continued by Capt Howey alone, following Zborowski's death.

The children's book by Ian Fleming, Chitty Chitty Bang Bang, and the subsequent musical film, were inspired by the romance of Zborowski's exploits. Fleming had watched Zborowski race at Brooklands as a school boy, and later visited Higham Park (then known as Highland Court) as a friend of its later owner, Walter Whigham, the chairman of Robert Fleming & Co. merchant bank founded by Ian's grandfather. In the third book, Zborowski is a major character, where his relationship to Chitty is explored and his future deadly crash is alluded to.

To mark the centenary of his death, Aston Martin in conjunction with Aston Martin Heritage Trust, arranged for apprentices at the firm to repaint the railings on Zborowski's family grave in British Racing Green. On the anniversary of the date itself (19 October 2024) the first two Aston Martin Grand Prix cars were presented in the graveyard (Zborowski had funded and raced both) and a service of remembrance was held.

== Motorsports career results ==
=== Indianapolis 500 results ===
Year	Car	Start	Qual	Rank	Finish	Laps	Led	Retired
1923	27	5	91.800	15	20	41	0	Rod
Totals						41	0	

Starts	1
Poles	0
Front row	0
Wins	0
Top 5	0
Top 10	0
Retired	1
