= J. G. Parry Thomas =

British racing driver and land speed record holder (1884–1927)

John Godfrey Parry Thomas
- Born: 6 April 1884; Wrexham, Wales
- Died: 3 March 1927 (aged 42); Pendine Sands
- Cause of death: Serious head injury in motor accident during land speed record attempt
- Resting place: Byfleet, Surrey
- Education: Oswestry School, The City and Guilds College London
- Occupations: Engineer & motor-racing driver
- Employer: Leyland Motors

John Godfrey Parry Thomas (6 April 1884 – 3 March 1927) was a Welsh engineer and motor-racing driver who at one time held the land speed record. He was the first driver to be killed in pursuit of the land speed record.

== Early life and education ==
John Godfrey Parry Thomas was born in Wrexham, Wales, the son of the curate of Rhosddu. The family moved to nearby Oswestry when he was five years old, and he was educated at Oswestry School. He went on to study engineering at The City and Guilds College in London. Despite claims elsewhere on the internet, his surname was Thomas, not a hyphenated Parry-Thomas. He was known as Godfrey to his family but used the Christian name Parry for work and subsequent motor racing.

== Leyland Motors ==
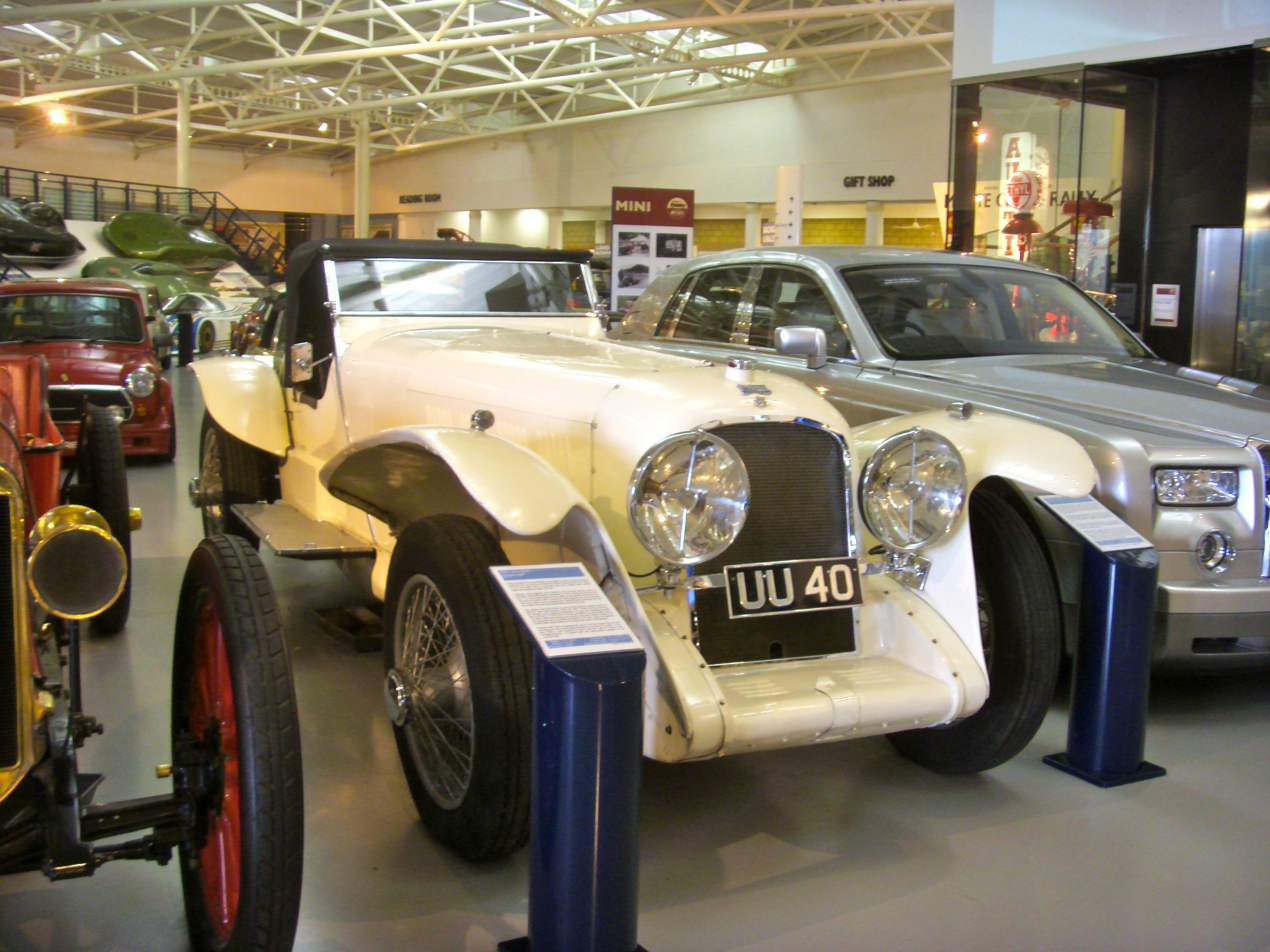
A 1927 Leyland Eight, with sports bodywork

Parry Thomas became chief engineer at Leyland Motors, a company whose main products were commercial vehicles. He filed for and received a number of patents, in the fields of electrical and automotive engineering. After the First World War he and his assistant Reid Railton designed the Leyland Eight luxury motor car, which was intended to compete with Rolls-Royce. His experience of driving this car around Brooklands in 1920 persuaded him to give up his career with Leyland to become a full-time motor-racing driver and engineer.

== Brooklands ==
In partnership with another engineer, Major Ken Thomson from New Zealand, he started Thomas Inventions Development Co., based inside the Brooklands circuit itself. After his death, this company became Thomson & Taylor and went on to build such cars as Malcolm Campbell's Blue Bird. From 1923 he lived in the "flying village" there, in a bungalow converted from a First World War hut named The Hermitage. It was an ascetic life, shared only with two Alsatian dogs and his cars, in stark contrast to the hedonism of the Bentley Boys. Parry-Thomas achieved some success on the circuit, winning 38 races in five seasons and setting numerous records.

In 1926, Thomas designed and built a Grand Prix car, the Thomas Special, which was not ready in time for the 1926 British Grand Prix; Thomas made two examples, which both raced in the 1927 British Grand Prix.

== Land speed record ==
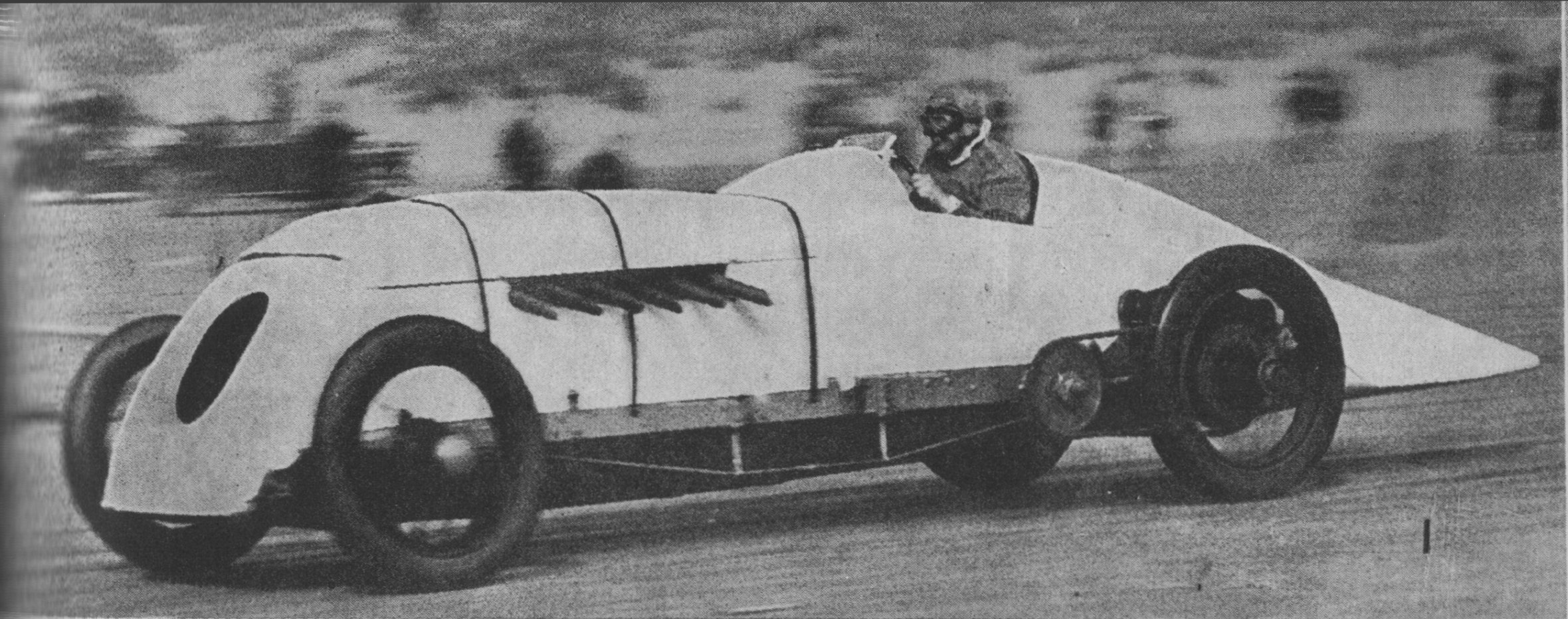
Babs at Pendine in 1926

By 1925 Parry Thomas realised that commercial success required a higher profile than Brooklands could offer, and switched his attention to the land speed record. He acquired the Higham Special from the estate of the deceased Louis Zborowski and rebuilt the car with new bodywork for improved aerodynamics. The car was powered by a huge 27-litre Liberty V-12 aero-engine. Without Campbell's money and prestige, or Henry Segrave's factory connections, Parry Thomas was unable to obtain a brand-new Napier Lion, as the other record contenders were planning. The car was running in 1925 but did not perform as expected.

In April 1926 the car, now named Babs, emerged with another new body. He celebrated by driving the lanes around Brooklands that same evening, despite his lack of headlamps.

A few days later, despite the poor conditions and soft, wet sand, Parry Thomas took the record at Pendine Sands, Wales, the same six-mile beach that Campbell had used in 1924 and 1925. The following day, 28 April 1926, he raised it to over 170 mph (270 km/h), a record that stood for almost a year.

== Death ==
During the winter of 1926/7 Babs was fitted with yet another new body, partially enclosing the drive and rear wheels by fairings. Parry Thomas was killed at Pendine Sands on 3 March 1927 while trying to regain the world land speed record that had been broken just weeks earlier by Malcolm Campbell on the same beach. At the time of the accident, it was thought that the right-hand chain had broken and had hit Thomas, causing a fatal head injury as the car was rolling.

During the subsequent restoration of the car, it was found that this could not have been the case and that it was more likely that Thomas had been killed as a result of the injuries he sustained while the car rolled and slid along the beach at more than 100 mph (160 km/h).

Parry Thomas was buried in St Mary's Churchyard in Byfleet, Surrey, close to the Brooklands Circuit. Following the inquest, Babs was buried in the dunes at Pendine Sands. Some 42 years later in 1969 it was controversially recovered, and over the next 15 years was restored by Owen Wyn Owen, at the time a member of Bangor University. For part of every summer, Babs remained on display at the Pendine Museum of Speed, Carmarthenshire until the museum's demolition in February 2021. The new museum building was completed in early 2023 and opened on 31 March.
