= Pendine Sands =

Beach along Carmarthen Bay, south Wales

Coordinates: 51°43′57″N 4°29′51″W

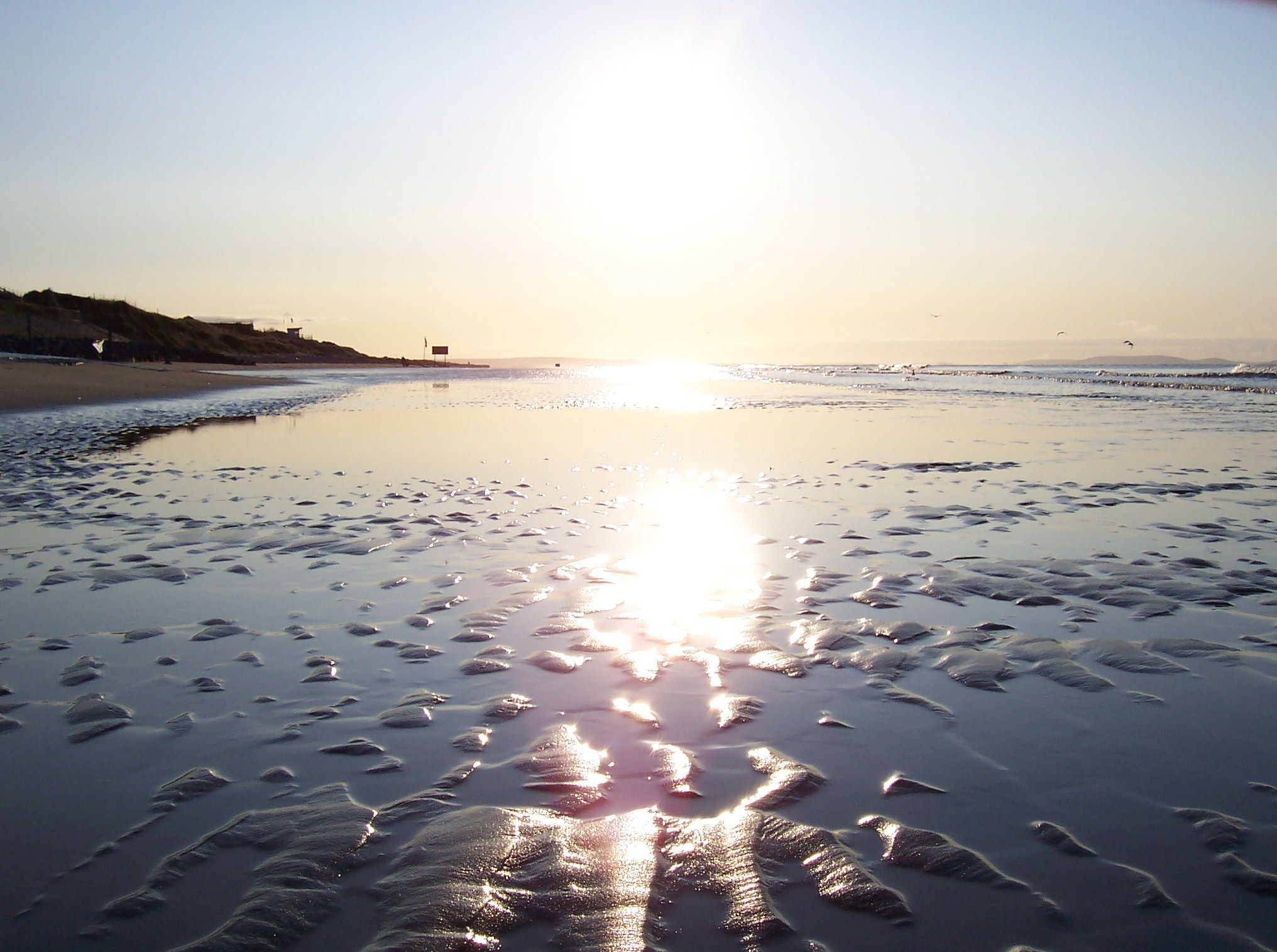
Pendine Sands (September 2008)

Map of South Wales coastline around Pendine Sands

Pendine Sands (Welsh: Traeth Pentywyn) is a 7-mile (11 km) beach on the shores of Carmarthen Bay on the south coast of Wales. It stretches west to east from Gilman Point to Laugharne Sands. The village of Pendine (Welsh: Pentywyn) is close to the western end of the beach.

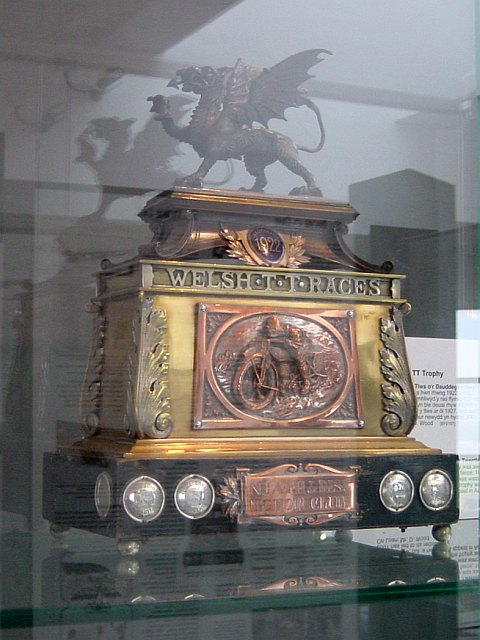
Welsh TT races Trophy, originally awarded for races on Pendine Sands, later (circa 1950) for races held on the hard roads of Mynydd Epynt

In the early 1900s the sands were used as a venue for car and motor cycle races. From 1922 the annual Welsh TT motor cycle event was held here. The firm, flat surface of the beach created a race track that was straighter and smoother than many major roads of the time. Motor Cycle magazine described the sands as "the finest natural speedway imaginable".

== Classic record attempts ==
In the 1920s it became clear that roads and race tracks were no longer adequate venues for attempts on the world land speed record. As record-breaking speeds approached 150 mph (240 km/h), the requirements for acceleration to top speed before the measured mile and safe braking distance afterwards meant that a smooth, flat, straight surface of at least 5 miles (8.0 km) in length was needed.

The first person to use Pendine Sands for a world land speed record attempt was Malcolm Campbell. On 25 September 1924 he set a world land speed record of 146.16 mph (235.22 km/h) on Pendine Sands in his Sunbeam 350HP car Blue Bird.

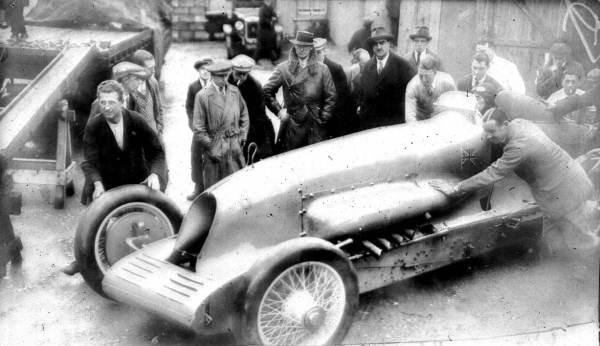
Campbell at Pendine in 1927

Four other record-breaking runs were made on Pendine Sands between 1924 and 1927; two more by Campbell, and two by Welshman J. G. Parry-Thomas in his car Babs. Firstly the 150 mph (240 km/h) barrier was broken by Campbell. In April 1926, Parry-Thomas added approximately 20 mph to break the land speed record at 171.02 mph (273.6 km/h). Campbell raised the record to 174.22 mph (280.38 km/h) in February 1927 with his second Blue Bird. On 3 March 1927, Parry-Thomas attempted to beat Campbell's record. On his final run while travelling at about 170 mph (270 km/h) the car crashed. There is an untrue urban myth that the exposed drive chain broke and partially decapitated him; Babs went out of control and rolled over. Parry-Thomas was the first driver to be killed in a world land speed record attempt.

One further attempt at the Land Speed Record was planned by Giulio Foresti in the "Djelmo", but Foresti crashed during a test run on 26 November 1927, totally destroying the car.

In 1933, Amy Johnson and her husband, Jim Mollison, took off from Pendine Sands in a de Havilland Dragon Rapide, G-ACCV "Seafarer", to fly non-stop to New York. Their aircraft ran out of fuel and was forced to crash-land at Bridgeport, Connecticut, just short of New York; both were seriously injured in the crash.

In June 2000, Donald Charles "Don" Wales, grandson of Sir Malcolm Campbell and a nephew of Donald Campbell, set the UK electric land speed record at Pendine Sands in Blue Bird Electric 2, achieving a speed of 137 mph (220 km/h).

== Present day ==
The Ministry of Defence (MOD) acquired Pendine Sands during the Second World War and used it as a firing range. The beach is still owned by the Ministry of Defence; prominent signs warn of the dangers of unexploded munitions and public access is restricted. From Monday to Friday part of the beach is closed off because of MOD operations. Between 9 July 2004 and May 2010 all vehicles were banned from using Pendine because of safety concerns, but since May 2010 cars have again been allowed access.

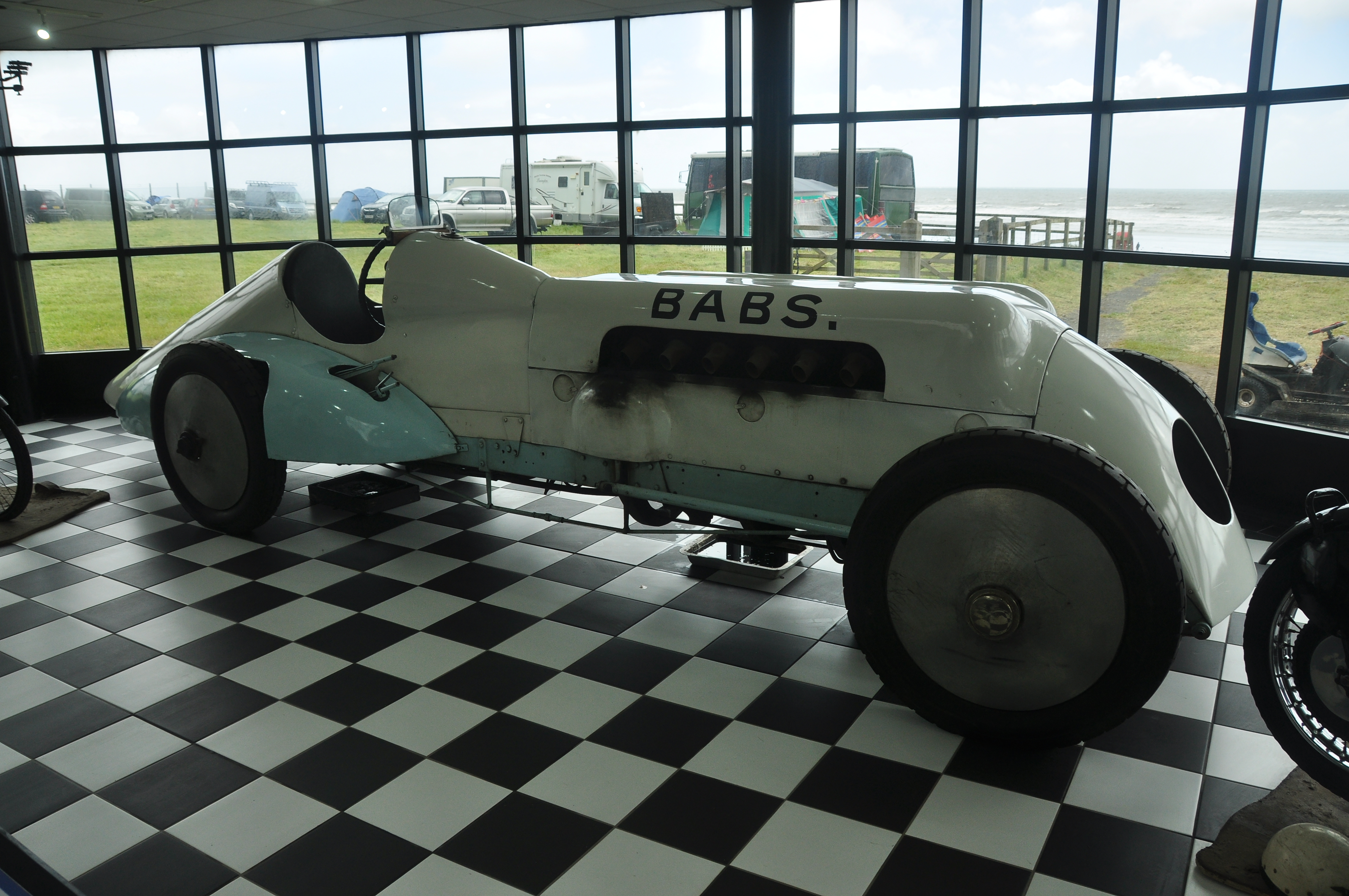
Babs in the former Pendine Museum of Speed

Parry-Thomas's car was buried in the sand dunes near the village of Pendine after his accident. In 1969, Owen Wyn Owen, an engineering lecturer from Bangor Technical College, received permission to excavate Babs, which he spent the next 16 years restoring. The car could be seen on display at the Museum of Speed in Pendine village during the summer months, prior to demolition of the building for redevelopment.

In 2011, Aardman Animations claimed the world's largest stop motion film set for Gulp, a short film. The beach was used as a 'canvas' with some props and characters sculpted from the sand. The film was captured using Nokia N8, then Nokia's top-of-the-range mobile phone. Overhead shots were obtained via a telescopic cherry picker platform on wheels. On 21 and 22 June 2013, Pendine Land Speed Racing Club initiated land speed racing events again on the sands.

The Vintage Hot Rod Association hosted their inaugural Amateur Hot Rod Races on Pendine Sands on 7 September 2013. Racing was open to members of the VHRA and their pre-1949 hot rods and saw 80 vehicles being timed flat out on the sands. This annual event involves participants from around the world. The event culminated in the VHRA winning a Motoring Event of the Year accolade at the International Historic Motoring Awards.

In September 2013, Guy Martin broke the UK speed record for a bicycle ridden in the slipstream of another vehicle. He hit a top speed of 112.9 mph while riding behind a modified truck driven by former British Truck Racing Championship winner, Dave Jenkins. The preparations for the record attempt were documented in Episode 1 of a Channel 4 series called Speed with Guy Martin, first broadcast in the UK in December 2013.

On 7 May 2015, actor Idris Elba broke the historic 'flying mile' UK land speed record, originally set by Malcolm Campbell, in a Bentley Continental GT Speed. The recorded speed was 180.361 mph.

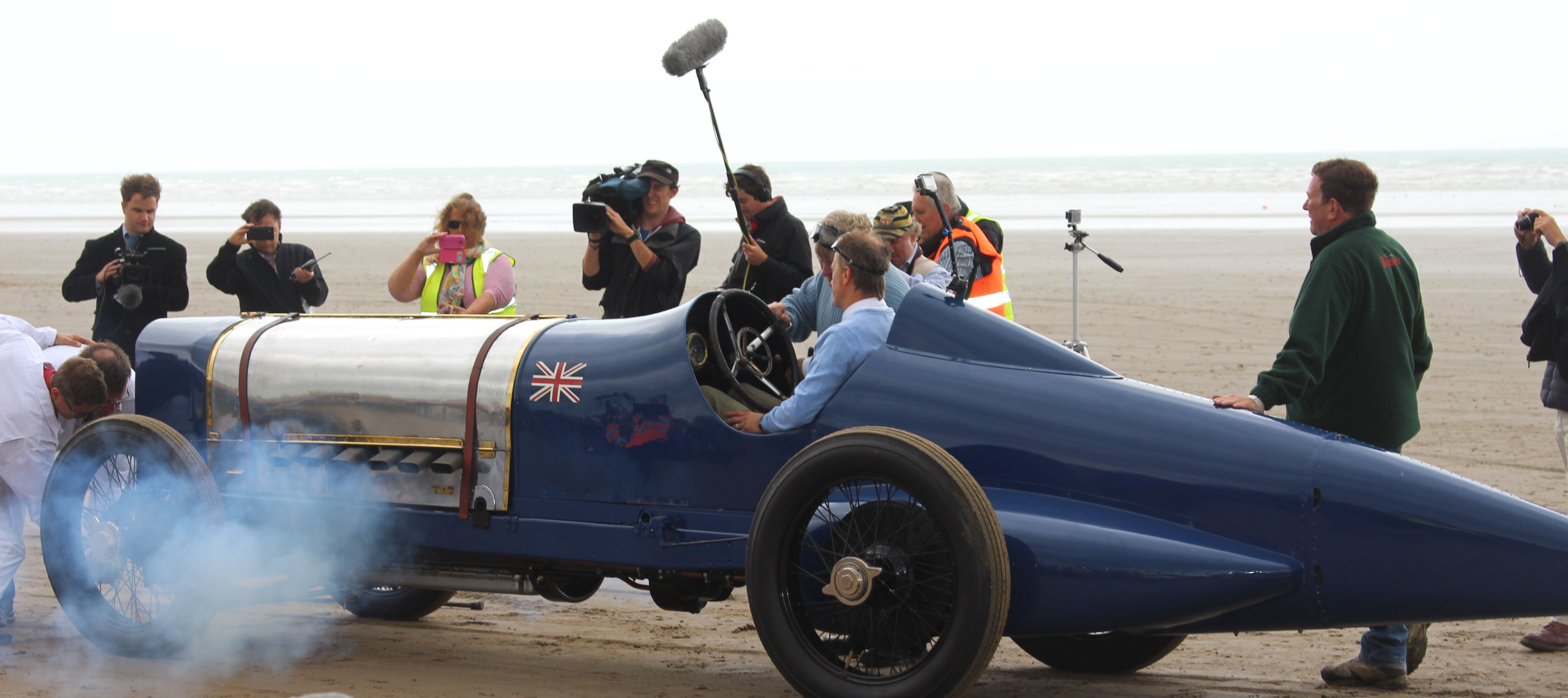
Sunbeam 350HP at Pendine Sands in Wales on the 90th anniversary of Sir Malcolm Campbell's land speed record

On 21 July 2015, at Pendine beach, the 90th anniversary of Sir Malcolm Campbell's first world land speed record in "Blue Bird" was recreated by his grandson, Don Wales, also a land speed record holder, in the fully restored car. Commenting on the restoration appeal, Wales said: "This beautiful car has been lovingly restored and looked after by Doug Hill and the team and it's only right that such an iconic car deserves to have the final pieces in place to complete her!"' The new gearbox will be part of a long-term project to restore the car to its 1925 specifications. This would also require the fabrication of two full-length exhaust pipes, a new seat and upholstery, and the re-manufacture of a slightly dropped nose cone and rear wheel spats.

On 12 May 2018, a home-built 'wooden shed' (using an Audi RS4 twin turbo engine, installed in a metal frame with wooden shed cladding) set a new speed record, achieving 101 mph (163 km/h), breaking its own previous record of 80 mph (130 km/h). The following day, 45-year-old Guernsey businessman Zef Eisenberg set a new land speed 'sand' record of 201.5 mph (324.3 km/h) on his 350-horsepower supercharged Suzuki Hayabusa motorcycle, the first time a speed in excess of 200 miles per hour had been achieved at Pendine. This was the fastest speed achieved by a wheel powered vehicle ever at Pendine. In 2019, Eisenberg set a new record of 210.332 mph (338.497 km/h) in a modified Porsche 911. He broke the records for flying mile and flying quarter on the same day.

Pendine Sands has been used as a location for filming, including BBC's Top Gear and the BBC Cymru drama Keeping Faith, starring Eve Myles.
