= Doll on a Music Box =

1968 song

"Doll on a Music Box" is a song originally from the 1968 musical film, Chitty Chitty Bang Bang. It was subsequently performed in the 2002/2005 stage musical Chitty Chitty Bang Bang as well. It is both a musical and lyrical counterpoint to the more free flowing, legato song, "Truly Scrumptious". In the song, Truly is disguised as a wind up music box doll, metaphorically and actually on a pedestal. In the song, Truly sings about herself and her rigid nature, all behind the mask of the "doll" she is portraying. In the motion picture, the part of Truly was played by actress Sally Ann Howes. In the stage musical version, the part was re-created by 19-year-old London actress, Emma Williams. In 2005, the Broadway "Truly" was portrayed by actress Erin Dilly, who was nominated for a Tony Award that year for the role.

== Visual metaphor ==
This sequence is a part of Caractacus's story, which he is telling to Truly and his children. In the song, Caractacus plays a rag doll, too flexible for his own good; whereas, Truly plays a doll that is too rigid for her own good. Twice during the counterpoint, the rag doll approaches the doll, only to be slapped in the face. This mirrors the earlier story where Caractacus's first two interactions with Truly are mistimed as well. The rag doll keeps trying, when suddenly he captures his own reflection and realizes how foolish he appears. It is only when Truly momentarily breaks character and shoves him slightly into the mirror to get his attention that he returns to his character. The rag doll properly courts the doll and is about to kiss the doll's hand, when she retracts her hand from him just in time. Rigidity wins out. Only at the end of the movie do Caractacus and Truly truly see eye to eye.

== Songwriters ==
The song was written by Robert B. Sherman & Richard M. Sherman.

== Trivia ==
- In 1992, "Doll on a Music Box" was re-enacted as part of a surrealistic sequence of the 1992 film, Arizona Dream starring Johnny Depp, Jerry Lewis, Faye Dunaway and Lili Taylor.
- The music video for the Barenaked Ladies 1998 single, "One Week" had a short reference to "Doll on a Music Box".

== Wardrobe ==
Truly Scrumptious sports a dirndl in this sequence consisting of a forest green satin bodice (trimmed in black velvet and accented with stitched crisscrossed red ribbon straps down the front and gold buttons), white blouse (the sleeves are double puffed done in delicate white silk satin; there are three yellow ribbons stitched to the sleeves for added detail; the collar is also trimmed in lace), full, printed (in the shape of gold diamonds) cotton red skirt (a tea length petticoat) and white, cotton apron (with a German inspired floral motif). Truly also wore white tights and black pumps (with a silver buckle near the toe area) with a Tyrolean hairstyle incorporating both pigtails and braids.
