= Come to the Funfair =

"Come to the Funfair" (originally called "Funfair") is a song first written for the 1968 musical film Chitty Chitty Bang Bang but was cut almost entirely from the final edit of the film. The musical theme is still heard in the soundtrack immediately after "Caractacus Potts" (Dick Van Dyke) sings "Hushabye Mountain". Then Potts gets the idea to earn money by cutting hair at the funfair. The music is heard as carnies walk by in the distance. The song was written by Robert B. Sherman & Richard M. Sherman.

== Musical resurrection ==
The song was resurrected for the 2002 stage production of the same name and was fashioned into a big transitional dance number. It was choreographed by Gillian Lynne. The song was directed with a "tinge of the psychedelic" by Royal Shakespeare Company director Adrian Noble partly as an ode to the original film's director's (Ken Hughes') fresh filmic treatment of the story. In the stage production of "Chitty Chitty Bang Bang" a siren whistle is featured in the song.
