= Lovely Lonely Man =

Song from "Chitty Chitty Bang Bang"

"Lovely Lonely Man" is a song from the 1968 musical film Chitty Chitty Bang Bang. It was written by Richard & Robert Sherman and sung by Sally Ann Howes as Truly Scrumptious. In the song, she pines for eccentric inventor Caractacus Potts (played by Dick Van Dyke) at her family's estate after she has an outing with the inventor and his children in the eponymous car.

Sally Ann Howes used the song in her audition for the role; van Dyke later recalled "They couldn't have picked a better Truly Scrumptious than Sally. ... I heard her voice and it was the richest contralto ... I thought 'My God, this girl is great'".

== Reasons for being cut ==
Due to the length of the motion picture and the need to accommodate standard TV broadcast practices, entire sequences are often cut for television programming purposes. "Lovely Lonely Man" and "The Roses of Success" are often cut from American television broadcasts.

- Both songs do not advance the main plot line of the film, so their absence is not missed in general.
- The song was cut from the 2002/2005 stage version of Chitty Chitty Bang Bang due to length and plot changes to the book by Jeremy Sams. The songwriters fought for the song's inclusion but were eventually convinced by director Adrian Noble that its inclusion was impossible.

:I've met so many men, So easy to forget

I thought I'd grown immune to them... and yet...
He's such a love... He's such a lovely lonely man...
