= U2 (disambiguation) =

U2 is an Irish rock band.

U2 or U-2 may also refer to:

== Arts and entertainment ==
- U2 by U2, an autobiography by the band members
- U2 (EP), a withdrawn 1991 record by Negativland
- Ultima II: The Revenge of the Enchantress, a 1982 role-playing video game
- Uncharted 2: Among Thieves, a 2009 action-adventure video game
- "U-2", a 2010 song of the bounty series by Iamamiwhoami
- U2, an Indian Kannada-language music television channel

== Aviation ==
- Lockheed U-2, a U.S. reconnaissance aircraft
- EasyJet (IATA code: U2), an airline
- Polikarpov U-2, a Soviet biplane known as U-2 before 1944
- Wills Wing U2, an American hang glider design
- Udet U 2, a German light aircraft

== Transportation and vehicles ==
- German submarine U-2, one of several German submarines
- London Buses route U2
- Siemens–Duewag U2, a light rail vehicle

=== U-Bahn lines ===
- U2 (Berlin U-Bahn)
- U2 (Frankfurt U-Bahn)
- U2 (Hamburg U-Bahn)
- U2 (Munich U-Bahn)
- U2 (Nuremberg U-Bahn)
- U2 (Vienna U-Bahn)

== Organizations ==
- Under2 Coalition, a group of states and subnational jurisdictions committed to fighting climate change
- U2 Clothing, a casual-wear brand

== Science and technology ==
- Diuranium (U_{2}), two uranium atoms in a molecule
- U(2), the two-dimensional unitary group in mathematics

=== Biology ===
- U2 spliceosomal RNA, a component of the spliceosome
- Urotensin 2, a cardiovascular peptide
- Haplogroup U2 (mtDNA), a human mitochondrial DNA lineage

=== Computing and electronics ===
- D battery, a dry-cell battery type also known as U2
- U.2 (formerly known as SFF-8639), a connector used by some NVM Express storage devices
- Rocket U2, UniVerse and UniData database systems
- The Apple U2, an ultra-wideband chip

== Other uses ==
- U2, an unemployment figure released by the U.S. Bureau of Labor Statistics
- Nikon U2, a film SLR camera also known as the F75 and N75

== See also ==
- 1960 U-2 incident, an international incident involving a U.S. Lockheed U-2 over the Soviet Union
- Yutu
- You Too (disambiguation)
- "You Two", a song from the 1968 musical film Chitty Chitty Bang Bang
- 2U (disambiguation)
- UU (disambiguation)
