= Chitty Chitty Bang Bang (musical) =

Stage musical

- Poster for original Broadway production
- Music: Richard M. Sherman; Robert B. Sherman
- Lyrics: Richard M. Sherman; Robert B. Sherman
- Book: Jeremy Sams
- Basis: Chitty Chitty Bang Bang by; Roald Dahl; Ken Hughes; Richard Maibaum; Chitty-Chitty-Bang-Bang by Ian Fleming
- Premiere: April 16, 2002: London Palladium
- Productions: 2002 West End; 2005 Broadway; 2005 national UK tour; 2007 Singapore; 2008 US tour; 2009 UK and Ireland Tour; 2012 Australian national tour; 2014 Munich; 2015 UK tour; 2024 UK Tour

Chitty Chitty Bang Bang is a stage musical with music and lyrics written by Richard M. and Robert B. Sherman and a book by Jeremy Sams. It is based on the 1968 film of the same name starring Dick Van Dyke, Sally Ann Howes and Lionel Jeffries with screenplay by Roald Dahl, Ken Hughes, and Richard Maibaum. The 1968 film was based in turn on the book of the same name by Ian Fleming. The musical's world premiere was staged at the London Palladium on April 16, 2002, directed by Adrian Noble before the show opened on Broadway in 2005.

== Synopsis ==
=== Act I ===
The junkyard manager Coggins recounts the last race of the British champion race car, the Paragon Panther, which was contested against the Vulgarian Vulture in the 1910 British Grand Prix: the Panther crashed after Vulgarian spies sabotaged it ("Opening"). Years later, the Panther sits in a junkyard, forgotten by all save the young siblings Jeremy and Jemima Potts, who are enamored with Coggins' tales and the car's history. They are shocked when Coggins tells them he plans to scrap it, but he promises to save the Panther for them if they can purchase and move it within a few weeks. Truly Scrumptious, daughter of the wealthy Lord Scrumptious, arrives at the junkyard seeking a spare part, but upon finding the truant children, takes them home to their father, the widowed inventor Caractacus. Meanwhile, two Vulgarian spies, Boris and Goran, acting under the direction of their leader, autocratic Baron Bomburst, have discovered the location of the Panther and make plans to purchase the car before the children.

Truly arrives at the Potts household, an old windmill, with the children and lectures Caractacus on their improper upbringing before leaving; as he prepares a meal for the children ("You Two"), they tell him about the plans to scrap the Panther and he promises to purchase the car for them. Caractacus's father, Grandpa Potts, recounts the family's troubles ("Them Three") and after trying some of his son's inventions, realizes he has devised a candy that can be played like a flute. The next day, Caractacus goes to Lord Scrumptious's candy factory to sell the design and raise the money needed for the Panther. Truly helps the Potts family make their sales pitch ("Toot Sweets"), but the demonstration ends in disaster as the musical boiled sweets unintentionally summon many stray dogs who invade the factory. Boris and Goran decide to pass themselves off as locals ("Think Vulgar" / "Act English") as they realize the patriotic Coggins will never sell the Panther to Vulgarians. Dispirited from the Scrumptious Sweet Factory debacle, Caractacus sings a lullaby to the children ("Hushabye Mountain") and decides to try selling another invention tomorrow.

In the morning, Caractacus brings another invention, his automatic hair-cutting machine, to a local fair ("Come to the Funfair"), but the first demonstration again goes awry, as the hapless inventor's machine shaves the prospective client nearly bald. Caractacus escapes the wrathful client by joining a spirited morris dance group ("Me Ol' Bamboo") and the hair-cutting machine is sold instead to a turkey farmer, who plans to use it to pluck and cook his birds, giving Caractacus the money he needs to purchase the Panther. After purchasing the derelict racer and towing it home, Caractacus performs an intensive restoration while Grandpa and the children maintain the household ("Posh!"); after several days, Caractacus emerges from the workshop with the beautifully refurbished car, which they decide to take for a drive with Truly. Collectively, they rename the car Chitty Chitty Bang Bang for the unusual noises made by the engine ("Chitty Chitty Bang Bang"), and the four go for a seaside picnic.

During the picnic, the children confess their love to Truly ("Truly Scrumptious"), who reciprocates and realizes she has feelings for Caractacus as well; distracted by their emotions, the adults fail to notice they have become stranded by the rising tide, but Chitty demonstrates its amphibious capabilities by transforming into a boat ("Chitty Chitty Bang Bang" (nautical reprise)) as the Vulgarians attempt to capture the car and the Potts make a clean escape with Truly. Learning the car is also a boat both infuriates Baron Bomburst and renews his desire to own it. The Vulgarians arrive at the Potts family windmill first, though, and believing mistakenly that Grandpa is responsible for the wonders of Chitty, they hook his hut from an airship, kidnapping him inside. The rest of the family arrive with Truly in time to see them taking off with Grandpa. Speeding in pursuit, Chitty goes over a cliff but in another remarkable display, transforms into an aircraft ("Chitty Takes Flight") and follows the airship, hut, and Grandpa back to Vulgaria.

=== Act II ===
Upon his arrival in Vulgaria ("Vulgarian National Anthem"), Grandpa is forced by Baron Bomburst to give the Baron's car floating and flying capabilities like Chitty, working with other inventors previously kidnapped by the Baron. After learning they have failed for years to accomplish this, Grandpa despairs but is cheered by his fellow prisoners, who see their failures merely as learning experiences ("The Roses of Success"). Chitty arrives shortly afterwards bearing Truly and the three remaining Potts; the Toymaker hustles them into his workshop just as the Childcatcher rushes to their landing site, suspecting the presence of children, who are banned in Vulgaria ("Kiddy-Widdy-Winkies"). As Caractacus learns that to comply, the citizens of Vulgaria have sent their children underground to live in the sewers, the Childcatcher tricks Truly and imprisons Jeremy and Jemima.

Caractacus, Truly, and the Toymaker devise a plan to rescue the children and Grandpa; having learned of Vulgaria's misery, Caractacus and Truly vow to end the Baron's rule ("Teamwork"), while the Baron and Baroness prepare for his birthday party ("Chu-Chi Face"). The Baroness's party plans come to fruition ("The Bombie Samba") as the Toymaker brings in Truly and Caractacus, disguised as dolls that sing and dance ("Doll on a Music Box" / "Truly Scrumptious" (reprise)), distracting the Baron as the children of Vulgaria rush from the sewers and overpower the Baron's henchmen. The Potts children and Grandpa are rescued ("Us Two" / "Chitty Prayer"). The Toymaker banishes the Baron and Baroness from Vulgaria and the children from underground are reunited with their families ("Teamwork" (reprise)). Caractacus and Truly declare their love for each other as they fly home to England ("Chitty Flies Home").

== Production history ==
=== Original London production (2002–2005) ===
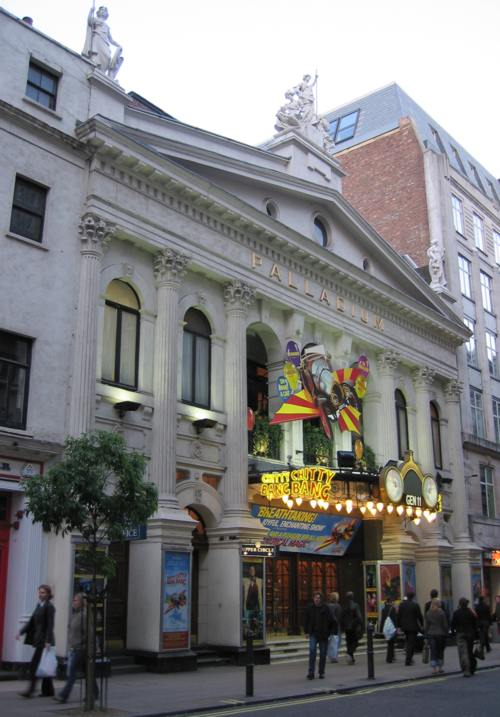
London Palladium marquee featuring the musical, May 2004

The West End production opened at the London Palladium on April 16, 2002, with six new songs by the Sherman Brothers who wrote the original Academy Award-nominated title and song score as well. The West End production was directed by Adrian Noble (at the time the artistic director of the Royal Shakespeare Company) with musical staging and choreography by Gillian Lynne and starred Michael Ball as Caractacus Potts, Emma Williams as Truly Scrumptious, Anton Rodgers as Grandpa Potts, Brian Blessed as Baron Bomburst, Nichola McAuliffe as Baroness Bomburst and Richard O'Brien as the Childcatcher. The Palladium's famous revolving stage (as seen on Sunday Night at the London Palladium) was entirely taken out to accommodate the technology and storage space for the flying Chitty car, identified by Guinness World Records as the most-expensive stage prop, costing £750,000.

The production closed on September 4, 2005, making it the longest running show ever at the London Palladium, taking in over £70 million in its three-and-a-half-year run.

=== Original Broadway production (2005) ===
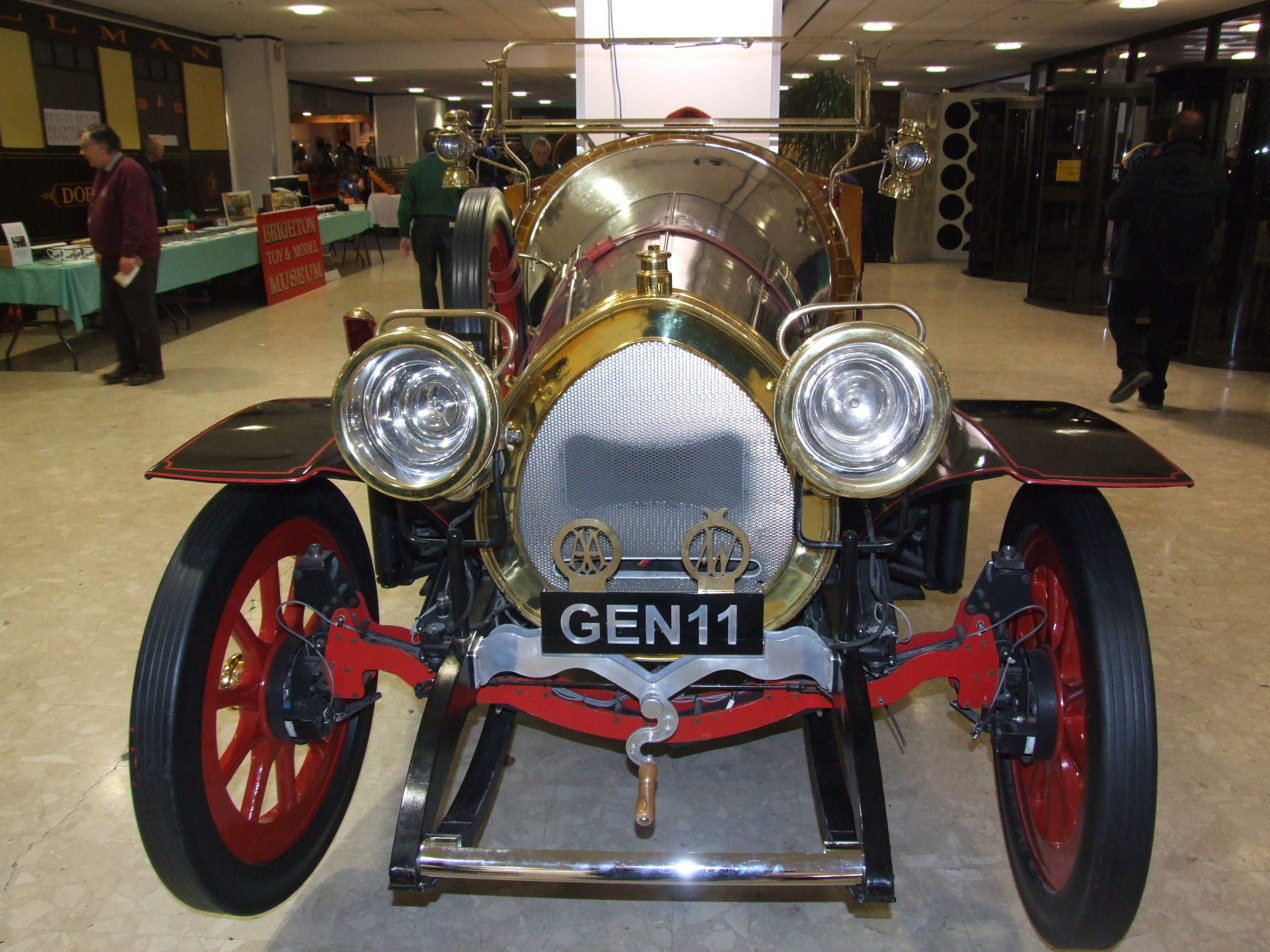
2005 Broadway prop car

The Broadway production opened on April 28, 2005, at the Lyric Theatre (then the Hilton Theatre), garnering good reviews only for the lavish sets. Ben Brantley in The New York Times noted that the show "naggingly recalls the cold, futurist milieus of movies like 'Modern Times' and 'Metropolis,' in which machines rule the universe" and featured songs that sounded "not unlike what you might hear in sing-along hour in a pre-K class". The production was again directed by Adrian Noble with choreography by Gillian Lynne and starred Raúl Esparza (Caractacus Potts), Erin Dilly (Truly Scrumptious), Philip Bosco (Grandpa Potts), Marc Kudisch (Baron Bomburst), Jan Maxwell (Baroness Bomburst), Ellen Marlow (Jemima Potts), and Henry Hodges (Jeremy Potts). The Broadway production closed on December 31, 2005, after 34 previews and 285 regular performances. According to producer Nicholas Paleologos, "A substantial portion of the $15 million (initial investment) will not be recouped on Broadway."

=== Touring productions ===
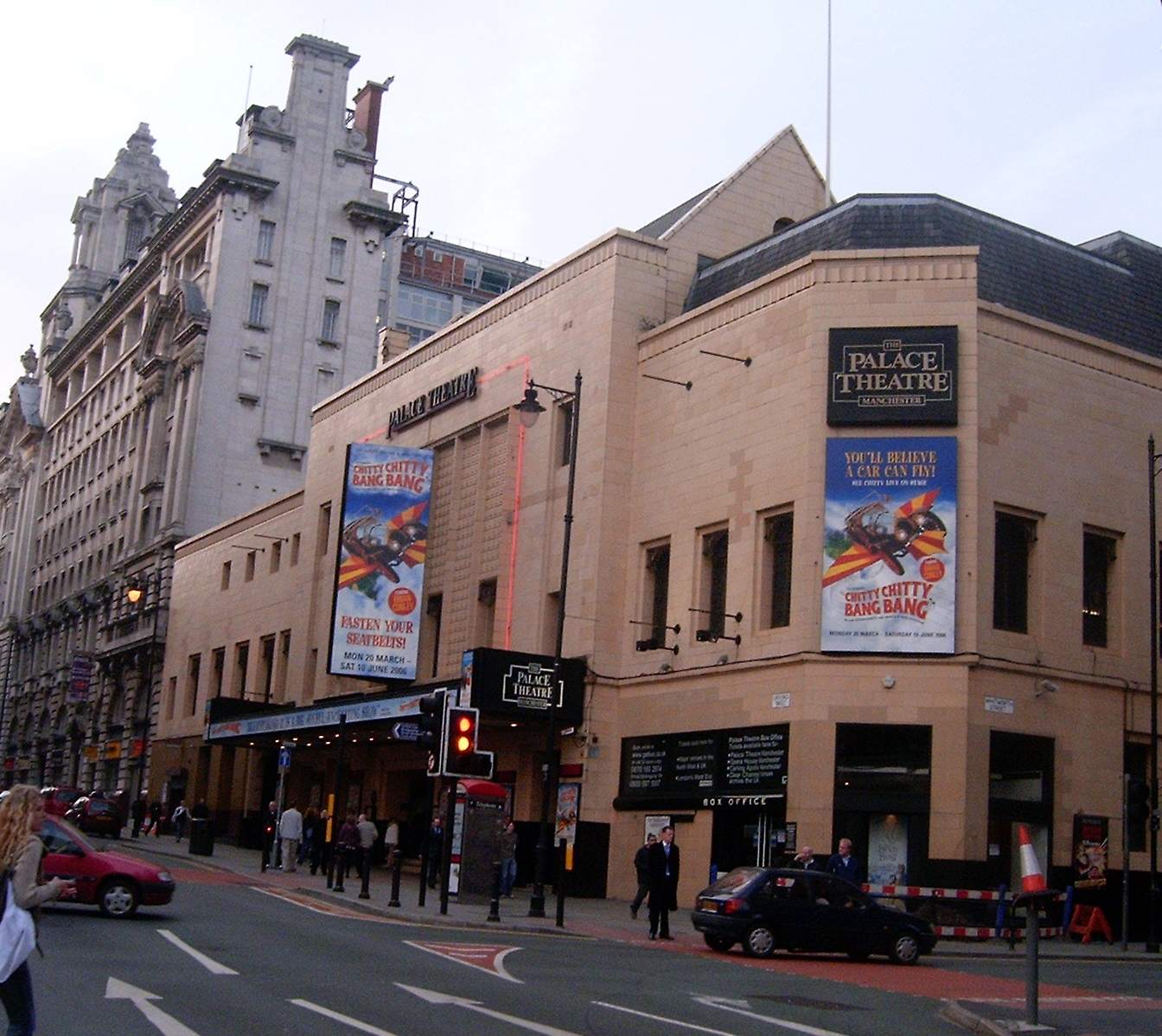
At the Palace Theatre (Manchester) (December 2006)

The London Palladium production toured around the UK, stopping in Sunderland (December 9, 2005 – March 4, 2006), Manchester (March 20 – June 10, 2006), Birmingham (June 23 – September 2, 2006), Liverpool (September 18 – November 18, 2006), Edinburgh (December 1, 2006 – February 24, 2007), Bristol (March 9 – June 9, 2007) and Southampton (June 25 – September 15, 2007), Bradford (February 11 – April 5, 2008), Sunderland (April 17 – June 7, 2008), Cardiff (July 3 – August 30, 2008). The UK tour visited Asia for the first time when it opened on November 2, 2007, in Singapore's Esplanade – Theatres on the Bay. Encouraging ticket sales resulted in an extension of the show to December 9, adding 24 more shows to a run which was originally planned to end on November 18, 2007.

A US national tour began in November 2008 at the Broward Center in Ft. Lauderdale, Florida, with a revised script by Ray Roderick, who was the tour director. These revisions have since become part of the licensed script. The original US touring prop car is now under exclusive ownership by Tony Garofalo of New York City, released by Big League Productions and currently being used for private display use as well as fundraising events. This prop vehicle is a full-sized version and fully equipped with many hydraulically activated stage tricks, such as surround stage mounted lighting, retractable wings, and spinning 45-degree tilt tires.

In 2009, the production toured the UK and Ireland until 2010 on a smaller scale, directed by original director Adrian Noble and choreographed by David Morgan. This tour used the script revisions used for the US tour by Ray Roderick. The tour opened in Plymouth at the Theatre Royal on July 3, 2009, and finished in Eastbourne (August 18 – September 4, 2010)

A new production produced by Music and Lyrics Productions opened at the West Yorkshire Playhouse for the Christmas 2015 season, directed by James Brining and choreographed by Stephen Mear. Following the run at the West Yorkshire Playhouse, the production toured the UK and Ireland and ended in February 2017 at the Bristol Hippodrome. Casting for the tour included Jason Manford and Lee Mead as Caractacus Potts, Phill Jupitus and Shaun Williamson as Baron Bomburst, Michelle Collins and Claire Sweeney as Baroness Bomburst, Carrie Hope Fletcher and Charlotte Wakefield as Truly Scrumptious and Martin Kemp and Jos Vantyler as the Childcatcher. On March 20, 2020, Charles Hanson of Hanson Auctioneers in Staffordshire announced the firm would sell approximately 120 items, including the flying car, from this production on April 20.

A new production directed by Thom Southerland, choreographed by Karen Bruce and designed by Morgan Large opened at the Mayflower Theatre, Southampton, on April 30, 2024, before embarking on a UK and Ireland tour until May 2025. In November 2023, it was announced that Adam Garcia would star as Caractactus Potts, with Ore Oduba taking over in the role from March 2025. Further casting included Liam Fox as Grandpa Potts, Ellie Nunn as Truly Scrumptious and Charlie Brooks, Elaine C. Smith and The Vivienne (who died during the tour) as the Childcatcher.

A revival will open at the Watermill Theatre in Newbury, Berkshire, from 26 May to 13 September 2026, directed by the theatre's artistic director Paul Hart.

=== Other worldwide productions ===
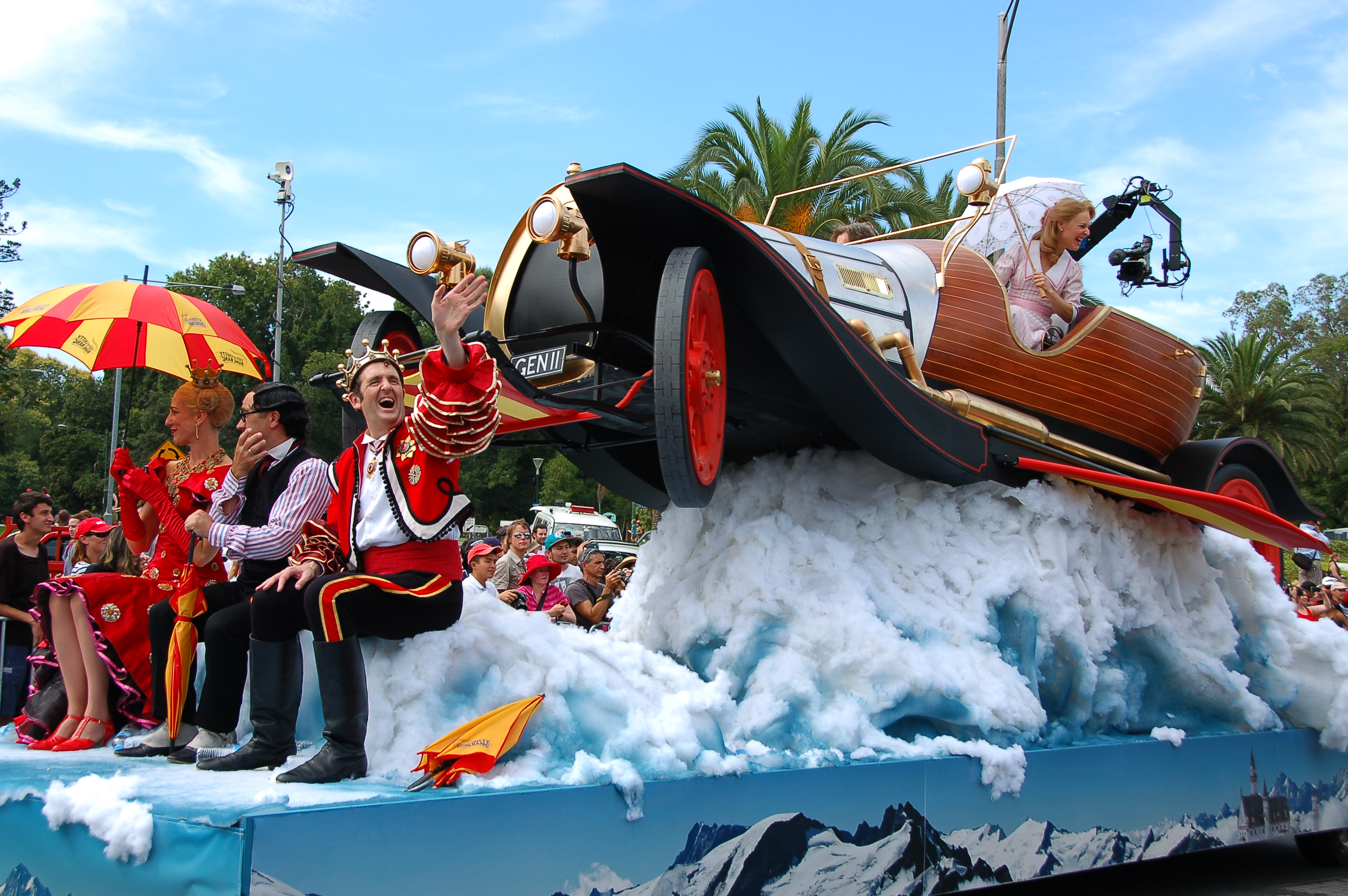
Australian cast on a float during the Moomba Parade in Melbourne (March 2013)

The Australian national production of Chitty Chitty Bang Bang opened on November 17, 2012, at the Capitol Theatre in Sydney, featuring David Hobson and Rachael Beck.

The German premiere of Chitty Chitty Bang Bang took place on April 30, 2014, at the Prinzregententheater in Munich, translated by Frank Thannhaeuser, directed by Josef E. Koepplinger and choreographed by Ricarda Regina Ludigkeit. The same team staged another production at State Theatre on Gaertnerplatz in early 2020.

== Musical numbers ==
Act I

- Overture — Orchestra
- Prologue — Company
- "You Two" — Caractacus, Jeremy & Jemima
- "Them Three" — Grandpa Potts
- "Toot Sweets" — Caractacus, Truly, Lord Scrumptious & Ensemble
- "Think Vulgar" (2002) "Act English" (2003–present) — Boris and Goran
- "Hushabye Mountain" — Caractacus
- "Come to the Funfair" — Company*
- "Me Ol' Bamboo" — Caractacus & Ensemble
- "Posh!" — Grandpa Potts, Jeremy & Jemima
- "Chitty Chitty Bang Bang" — Caractacus, Truly, Jeremy & Jemima, & Grandpa Potts
- "Truly Scrumptious" — Jeremy, Jemima & Truly
- "Chitty Chitty Bang Bang" (Nautical reprise) — Caractacus, Truly, Jeremy & Jemima
- "Chitty Takes Flight" — Company

Act II

- "Entr'acte" — Orchestra
- "Vulgarian National Anthem" — Company
- "The Roses of Success" — Grandpa Potts & Inventors
- "Kiddy-Widdy-Winkies" — Childcatcher*
- "Teamwork" — Caractacus, Toymaker, Truly & Juvenile Ensemble
- "Chu-Chi Face" — Baron & Baroness Bomburst
- "The Bombie Samba" — Baroness, Baron & Ensemble
- "Doll on a Music Box"/"Truly Scrumptious" (Reprise) — Truly & Caractacus
- "Us Two"/"Chitty Prayer" — Jeremy & Jemima*
- "Teamwork" (Reprise) — Toymaker & Company
- "Chitty Flies Home (Finale)" — Company

Notes

*Songs were omitted for the 2008 US tour. "Kiddy-Widdy-Winkies" was replaced with a version of "Lovely Lonely Man" from the original film, sung by Truly Scrumptious.

== Cast and characters ==
Main roles and performers, by production
Character	London	Broadway	UK tour	US tour	UK tour	Australia	UK and Ireland tour	UK and Ireland tour
Character	2002	2005	2005	2008	2009	2012	2015	2024
Caractacus Potts	Michael Ball	Raúl Esparza	Tim Flavin	Steve Wilson	Darren Bennett	David Hobson	Jon Robyns	Adam Garcia
Truly Scrumptious	Emma Williams	Erin Dilly	Marissa Dunlop	Kelly McCormick	Rachel Stanley	Rachael Beck	Amy Griffiths	Ellie Nunn
Grandpa Potts	Anton Rodgers	Philip Bosco	Paul Greenwood	Dick Decareau	John Griffiths	Peter Carroll	Andy Hockley	Liam Fox
Jeremy Potts	Luke Newberry George Gillies Harry Smith	Henry Hodges	Tom Hunter Connor Doyle Daniel Jukes Daniel Shaw Harrison Edwards Samuel Wright Adam Hargreaves	Jeremy Lipton Zachary Carter Sayle	Venue dependent	Michael Kilbane Anthony Garcia Max Walburn	Harry Grasby Henry Kent Hayden Goldberg Elliot Kelly	Ayrton English Charlie McGuire Roshan Thomson Louis Wilkins
Jemima Potts	Carrie Hope Fletcher Lauren Morgan Kimberley Fletcher	Ellen Marlow	Leyci Wightman Maddy Allison Shona Eaton Chloe Jones Harriet Back Shannon Wake Katie Reynolds Dominique Skinner Niamh Coombes (Singapore only)	Aly Brier Camille Mancuso	Venue dependent	Jasmin Younger Rose Shannon-Duhigg Ashleigh Ross	Lucy Sherman Caitlin Surtees Darcy Snares	Gracie Cochrane Isla Ithier Isabella Manning Jasmine Nyena
Baron Bomburst (Note: "Baron Bomburst" and "Lord Scrumptious" were played by the same actor after changes to the 2008 US tour.)	Brian Blessed	Marc Kudisch	Sean Blowers	George Dvorsky	Edward Peel	Alan Brough, Shane Bourne	Don Gallagher	Martin Callaghan
Baroness Bomburst (Note: Actress also played "Miss Phillips" after changes to the 2008 US tour.)	Nichola McAuliffe	Jan Maxwell	Jane Gurnett	Elizabeth Ward	Kim Ismay	Jennifer Vuletic	Tamsin Carroll	Jenny Gayner
Childcatcher (Note: Actor also played "Junkman" after changes to the 2008 US tour.)	Richard O'Brien	Kevin Cahoon	Robin Askwith	Oliver Wadsworth	Dean Maynard	Tyler Coppin	Stephen Matthews	Charlie Brooks
Toymaker (Note: Actor also played "Coggins" after changes to the 2005 UK tour.)	Edward Petherbridge	Frank Raiter	Richard Owens	Richard G. Rodgers	Tony Jackson	Phillip Gould	Ewan Cummins	John Macaulay
Boris	David Ross	Robert Sella	Robert Traynor	Dirk Lumbard	Richard Ashton	Todd Goddard	Sam Harrison	Adam Stafford
Goran	Emil Wolk	Chip Zien	Nigel Garton	Scott Cote	Nigel Garton	George Kapiniaris	Scott Paige	Michael Joseph
Lord Scrumptious	David Henry	Kenneth Kantor	Duncan Smith	George Dvorsky	Edward Peel	Alan Brough	Don Gallagher	Hadrian Delacey

=== Notable original London production replacements (2002–05) ===
- Caractacus Potts: Gary Wilmot, Jason Donovan, Brian Conley
- Truly Scrumptious: Caroline Sheen, Scarlett Strallen, Jo Gibb
- Grandpa Potts: Russ Abbott, Tony Adams
- Baron Bomburst: Victor Spinetti, Christopher Biggins
- Baroness Bomburst: Sandra Dickinson, Louise Gold
- Childcatcher: Paul O'Grady, Peter Polycarpou, Derek Griffiths, Lionel Blair, Stephen Gately, Wayne Sleep, Alvin Stardust
- Goran: Christopher Ryan

=== Notable 2005 UK tour replacements ===
- Caractacus Potts: Brian Conley, Gary Wilmot, Joe McFadden, Craig McLachlan, Kevin Kennedy, Matt Baker, Aled Jones
- Grandpa Potts: Gregor Fisher, Tony Adams
- Baron Bomburst: Ken Morley
- Baroness Bomburst: Barbara Rafferty
- The Childcatcher: Kevin Kennedy, Alvin Stardust, Richard O'Brien, Russ Spencer, Ian 'H' Watkins

=== Notable 2015 UK and Ireland tour replacements ===
- Caractacus Potts: Jason Manford, Lee Mead
- Truly Scrumptious: Carrie Hope Fletcher
- Baron Bomburst: Phill Jupitus, Shaun Williamson
- Baroness Bomburst: Michelle Collins, Claire Sweeney
- The Childcatcher: Martin Kemp, Jos Vantyler

=== Notable 2024 UK and Ireland tour replacements ===
- Caractacus Potts: Ore Oduba
- The Childcatcher: Elaine C. Smith, The Vivienne

== Awards and nominations ==
=== Original London production ===
Year	Award	Category	Nominee	Result
2003	Whatsonstage.com Awards	Best New Musical		Nominated
2003	Whatsonstage.com Awards	Best Actor in a Musical	Michael Ball	Nominated
2003	Whatsonstage.com Awards	Best Actress in a Musical	Emma Williams	Nominated
2003	Whatsonstage.com Awards	Best Supporting Actress in a Musical	Nichola McAuliffe	Nominated
2003	Whatsonstage.com Awards	Best Set Design	Anthony Ward	Won
2003	Laurence Olivier Award	Best New Musical		Nominated
2003	Laurence Olivier Award	Best Performance in a Supporting Role in a Musical	Nichola McAuliffe	Nominated
2003	Laurence Olivier Award	Best Set Design	Anthony Ward	Nominated

=== Original Broadway production ===
Year	Award	Category	Nominee	Result
2005	Tony Award	Best Performance by a Leading Actress in a Musical	Erin Dilly	Nominated
2005	Tony Award	Best Performance by a Featured Actor in a Musical	Marc Kudisch	Nominated
2005	Tony Award	Best Performance by a Featured Actress in a Musical	Jan Maxwell	Nominated
2005	Tony Award	Best Scenic Design	Anthony Ward	Nominated
2005	Tony Award	Best Lighting Design	Mark Henderson	Nominated

=== 2015 UK and Ireland tour ===
Year	Award	Category	Nominee	Result
2017	Whatsonstage.com Awards	Best Actress in a Musical	Carrie Hope Fletcher	Nominated
2017	Whatsonstage.com Awards	Best Regional Production (at the New Wimbledon Theatre)		Nominated
