= You Too =

You too or You Too may refer to:

- Tu quoque (Latin for "you too"), an informal logical fallacy
- WMEU-CD, a television station also known as U Too
- "You Too", a 2013 song by Para One

== See also ==
- Youtooz, a Canadian toy company
- "You Two", a song from the 1968 musical film Chitty Chitty Bang Bang
- To You (disambiguation)
- Yutu, the Moon rabbit or Jade Hare
- U2 (disambiguation)
