= Heather Ripley =

Former Scottish child actor famous for her role in 'Chitty Chitty Bang Bang'

- Born: Dundee, Scotland
- Occupation: Actress
- Known for: Playing Jemima Potts in Chitty Chitty Bang Bang

Heather Ripley is a Scottish former actress. She is best known for the film Chitty Chitty Bang Bang (1968), in which she played Jemima Potts.

== Early life ==
Ripley was raised in Broughty Ferry, outside of Dundee, Scotland. Her father and grandfather owned an opticians' business, and her mother worked as a wardrobe mistress at Dundee Rep. Ripley would accompany her mother to rehearsals and replaced a young actress in the play Roar Like a Dove one week before it opened, which gained the notice of a talent scout. Six months before filming began for Chitty Chitty Bang Bang, she travelled to London with her parents to audition for the role of Jemima Potts. It was the first film for the two child stars, Ripley and Adrian Hall, who were cast after an extensive talent search.

Ripley took lessons to change her accent for the film, and later recalled: "They thought I was perfect for the part, apart from the accent. But they said that wasn't a problem as they'd get rid of it. I thought that sounded a bit ominous. What did they mean? Brain surgery?” Accompanied by her mother, Ripley was away from her Dundee home for 14 months for the filming of Chitty Chitty Bang Bang.

== Later years ==
After making Chitty Chitty Bang Bang, Ripley continued to audition for roles and eventually left the film industry. Her earnings from the film were held in trust until her 18th birthday, but she later recalled "After 10 years of it being invested, it was only about £7,000". She returned to Dundee, where she later joined the family optician business. Ripley also became involved in anti-nuclear activism and campaigns for the environment.

Ripley participated in the 1999 documentary After They Were Famous: Chitty Chitty Bang Bang. She attended the London premiere of the musical Chitty Chitty Bang Bang at the London Palladium in 2002. In 2004, she made a brief appearance in the independent film The Interview which was screened at that year's Edinburgh Film Festival. In 2004, she was interviewed with members of the original cast on ITV1 on Christmas Eve.

She was a guest at the Broadway premiere of the musical Chitty Chitty Bang Bang at the Hilton Theatre in 2005. In 2016, Ripley was a volunteer worker at the Lagadikia refugee camp outside Thessaloniki in Greece which provided food, clothing and support to about 875 people. In 2020, she voiced the character Babs in the independent-made short animation Lavatory of Terror, telephoning her lines in via her smartphone.

== Filmography ==
=== Films ===
- Chitty Chitty Bang Bang (1968) - Jemima Potts

=== Television ===
- After They Were Famous (as herself) - TV documentary (1999)
- After They Were Famous: Chitty Chitty Bang Bang (as herself) - interview (2004)
