= Act English =

Act English is a song created specifically for the stage musical production of Chitty Chitty Bang Bang. It was written by Robert and Richard Sherman in 2003 as a replacement song for "Think Vulgar". The song was first premiered at the London Palladium on March 15, 2003. It is an expositional song. That is, aspects of the plotline are revealed in its lyric. In the song the vulgarian spies discuss their plans to steal the Chitty Chitty Bang Bang car.

== About the song ==
- After March 15, 2003 "Think Vulgar" was no longer performed on stage; however, the song can still be found on the Original London Cast Album which was recorded in June 2002. There is no authorized recording of "Act English".
- Songwriter, Robert Sherman agreed to write the replacement song, "Act English", but only under protest. He felt that the song, "Think Vulgar" better suited the vulgarian Spies' personalities. Also, Sherman believed that "Act English" would not be immediately accessible to American audiences (even though he and his brother wrote it) due to the song's numerous references to specific English eccentricities.

== Why the song was replaced ==
The concept for "Act English" was conceived by book writer Jeremy Sams and director Adrian Noble who felt that "Think Vulgar" was not moving the story along at a quick enough pace. Although there were disagreements with regard to its necessity, the creative parties have remained friendly throughout the course of the show's long life.
