= U of U =

U of U may refer to:

- University of Ulster in Northern Ireland
- University of Utrecht, alternatively known as Utrecht University, in the Netherlands
- University of Utah in the United States

== See also ==
- UU (disambiguation)
