= Erin Dilly =

American actress

- Born: May 12, 1972 (age 54); Royal Oak, Michigan, U.S.
- Education: University of Michigan
- Years active: 1997–present
- Spouse: Stephen Buntrock
- Children: 2

Erin Dilly (born May 12, 1972) is an American actress. She is most noted for her portrayal of Truly Scrumptious in the 2005 musical Chitty Chitty Bang Bang, for which she was nominated for the Tony Award for Best Performance by a Leading Actress in a Musical and the Outer Critics Circle Award.

== Career ==
Dilly was raised in Southfield, Michigan and graduated from Birmingham Groves High School and the University of Michigan. In 2000, she was announced to play the lead in Thoroughly Modern Millie but left the show, being replaced by Sutton Foster. In addition to appearing on Broadway in Chitty Chitty Bang Bang in 2005, she played the role of Cinderella in the 2002 revival of Into the Woods.

Dilly has performed in regional theatre in Ken Ludwig's Leading Ladies at the Cleveland Play House and the Alley Theatre, Houston, Texas (2004). She also was "The Younger Woman" in Putting It Together at the Cape Playhouse, Massachusetts. She has performed in the national tour companies of South Pacific as Nellie (2001), Martin Guerre as Bertrande, and Beauty and the Beast as Belle (ca. 2000). In 2015, she played The Baker’s Wife in The Muny’s production of Into the Woods.

She appeared in the 2009 film Julie & Julia as Judith Jones. On television, she played Eleanor Thompson, a relative of Enoch "Nucky" Thompson (played by actor Steve Buscemi and based on Atlantic City, New Jersey political boss and racketeer Enoch L. Johnson) in the HBO television series Boardwalk Empire (2014) and Gwen Rice in "Genetics", the 11th episode of the 7th season of the CBS police procedural and legal drama Blue Bloods (2017).

Dilly is married to actor Stephen Buntrock and they have two children together, Anna Louise Buntrock, born April 11, 2006, and Catherine Caroline Buntrock, born March 9, 2009. She also has a step-daughter, Haley Buntrock, from Stephen's previous marriage.

== Broadway credits ==
- A Christmas Story (2012 original production), as Mother
- Chitty Chitty Bang Bang (2005 original production), as Truly Scrumptious
- The Boys from Syracuse (2002 revival), as Luciana
- Into the Woods (2002 revival), as Cinderella, replacing Laura Benanti
- Follies (2001 revival), as Young Phyllis

== Other stage work ==
- Into the Woods The Muny, as the Baker’s Wife (2015)
- Something Good (June 28, 2002 tribute concert to Richard Rodgers), performed "Oh Diogenes"
- Babes in Arms City Center Encores! (1999), staged concert as Billie Smith (also recorded)
- City Center 60th Anniversary concert

| Preceded by Jo Gibb | Actress to portray Truly Scrumptious; 2005 | Succeeded by Marissa Dunlop |
