= Emma Williams (actress) =

English actress

- Born: Emma Louise Williams; 20 May 1983 (age 43); Halifax, West Yorkshire, England
- Occupation: Actress
- Notable work: Kirsty in Steve Coogan's The Parole Officer
- Spouse(s): Matthew Henaughan 2011–2013; James Newton 2018–present

Emma Williams (born 20 May 1983) is an English actress of stage, screen, TV and radio. She has been nominated four times for an Olivier Award.

== Early life ==
Emma Louise Williams was born on 20 May 1983 in Halifax, West Yorkshire, to parents Gordon and Joan Williams and attended North Halifax Grammar School. She attended Stage 84 – The Yorkshire School of Performing Arts, Idle, Bradford. She received a languages degree from the Open University in 2012.

== Career ==
=== Stage ===
Williams made her professional stage debut in 2002, aged 18, playing leading lady Truly Scrumptious in the original cast of the West End production of Chitty Chitty Bang Bang at the London Palladium, winning the Arts Correspondent Award for Best Newcomer.

Williams was signed to play Maria von Trapp under a six-month contract. However, the winner of the BBC reality TV show How Do You Solve A Problem Like Maria? would still get a six-month contract and perform four of the shows each week. On 22 September 2006, Williams, in a joint statement with Andrew Lloyd Webber, left The Sound of Music, by mutual agreement.

In 2007, she played Johanna Barker in a concert version of Sweeney Todd: The Demon Barber of Fleet Street opposite Bryn Terfel as Todd, Maria Friedman as Lovett, and Philip Quast as Turpin.

In 2008, Williams appeared in Zorro, a new musical with the book by Helen Edmundson, lyrics by Stephen Clark and music by the Gipsy Kings and John Cameron, at the Garrick Theatre. For this performance she was nominated for an Olivier Award for Best Actress in a Musical.

Her second nomination for an Olivier Award for Best Actress in a Musical was for her portrayal of leukaemia victim Jenny Cavilleri in Love Story, the musical based on the film. The show played at the Duchess Theatre in the West End in December 2010 to February 2011, after running at the Chichester Minerva Theatre in May to June 2010.

Her third Olivier nomination was for Maureen in Mrs Henderson Presents, another film to stage musical adaptation. This nomination was for Best Supporting Actress in a Musical. The production began at Bath Theatre Royal and transferred to the Noël Coward Theatre in the West End, starting in February 2016. In the interim Williams played the role of Betty in White Christmas at West Yorkshire Playhouse, Leeds, directed by Nikolai Foster.

In 2017 she played Helen Walsingham in Cameron Mackintosh's new production of Half A Sixpence, with a revised book by Julian Fellowes and score and lyrics by Stiles and Drewe. This production reunited her with director Rachel Kavanaugh and again started in Chichester, this time in the Festival Theatre.

From 9 December – 14 January 2017 Williams played the role of Alice Fitzwarren in Dick Whittington at the London Palladium. In 2022, she played Lily in a one night concert of The Secret Garden at the London Palladium opposite Hadley Fraser as Archibald.

=== Recordings ===
Williams is featured on the original cast recordings of Chitty Chitty Bang Bang, Tomorrow Morning, Zorro, Love Story, Mrs Henderson Presents and the rewritten Half A Sixpence. She also features on the Original London Cast Recording of Bat Boy which features "Mine All Mine", written specifically for the UK production. Williams can also be heard singing several guest tracks on the 'Momentous Musicals' album of 2012 and the original London cast album of A Spoonful of Sherman as well as featuring as a guest vocalist for Lance Horne on First Things Last and Alexander Bermange for Songs of Wit and Whimsy

=== Television and film ===
Williams's career started in television. She appeared in the Yorkshire drama Heartbeat in November 1997, episode titled "Substitute" (Season 7), and in February 2001, "Who's Who?" (Season 10)

She made guest appearances on TV in Where The Heart Is and Silent Witness, and appeared in one-off dramas like Four Fathers and Marple – The Body in the Library. She appeared in the 2005 BBC TV serial Bleak House as Rosa, Lady Dedlock's "sweet-natured maid."

Her film debut came in 2001 playing Kirsty in Steve Coogan's The Parole Officer and she appeared in First Night (2011) with Richard E. Grant and Sarah Brightman.

In 2020, Williams also appeared as a non-celebrity contestant on the second episode of series 2 of the ITV quiz show Beat the Chasers, when she played for £10,000 against all four chasers. In April 2022, she portrayed Freya Marsh in an episode of the BBC soap opera Doctors.

=== Concerts and radio ===
Williams appeared as a guest vocalist on Michael Ball's Past and Present concert tour, which was filmed for DVD at the Royal Albert Hall. She has appeared as a guest artist on Friday Night Is Music Night twice for BBC Radio 2 in 2009, singing "Time to Say Goodbye" and "Over the Rainbow" and singing several numbers for a Rodgers and Hammerstein special at the Theatre Royal Drury Lane in 2015. Auditioned for Lucie Miller in Big Finish's 8th Doctor Adventures range.

== Personal life ==
On 3 October 2011 Williams married Matthew Henaughan whom she met in 2009. They divorced in 2013.

In 2018, Williams married James Newton, a drummer. They met whilst working together in a musical in 2015. They ran the 2019 London marathon, to raise money for a cancer charity. The couple have a daughter born in 2019.

Preceded by Sally Ann Howes	Actress to portray Truly Scrumptious; 2002–2003	Succeeded by Caroline Sheen
