= 2U =

2U or 2-U may refer to:

- 2U (album), a 2006 album by Keshia Chante, and its title track
- 2U (company), an educational technology company
- "2U" (David Guetta song), a 2017 song by David Guetta featuring Justin Bieber
- "2U" (Kang Daniel song), a 2020 song by Kang Daniel
- 2&U, a planned high-rise office building in Seattle, Washington, USA
- Sun d'Or International Airlines' IATA code
- 2U, a rack unit measurement
- The acronym for the second (2nd) catalog of Uhuru x-ray sources

== See also ==
- To You (disambiguation)
- U2 (disambiguation)
- UU (disambiguation)
- "To Ü", a song by Skrillex and Diplo from the 2015 album Skrillex and Diplo Present Jack Ü
