= Truly Scrumptious =

- Chitty Chitty Bang Bang character
- Truly Scrumptious, as portrayed by Sally Ann Howes in Chitty Chitty Bang Bang (1968).
- First appearance: Chitty Chitty Bang Bang
- Portrayed by: Sally Ann Howes

In-universe information
- Gender: Female
- Family: Lord Scrumptious (father)
- Significant other: Caractacus Potts
- Nationality: British

Truly Scrumptious is a fictional character in the 1968 film Chitty Chitty Bang Bang and stage production based on the children's novel of the same name by author Ian Fleming.

In the film, Truly Scrumptious is played by Sally Ann Howes, after the role was declined by Julie Andrews. Truly Scrumptious develops a romantic relationship with the widower Caractacus Potts (played by Dick Van Dyke). The character of Truly Scrumptious does not appear in the original novel, but the filmmakers felt that a budding romantic relationship would serve the movie better than the marriage portrayed in the book.

== Film ==
Truly Scrumptious is introduced as she swerves her car into a pond to avoid children Jeremy and Jemima. Truly takes them home to their father, an absent-minded inventor named Caractacus Potts, and ends up having an argument over his child-rearing methods. She leaves, but not before inspecting Caractacus' inventions, including a sweet-making machine that is currently producing defective sweets with holes in them, though her suggested fix is dismissed.

When Truly visits her father, Lord Scrumptious, at his sweet-making factory the next day, she finds Caractacus there, waiting to show her father his sweets, which can be played like penny whistles. Truly unexpectedly supports Caractacus in making a successful pitch to her father ("Toot Sweets"), but a pack of neighborhood dogs, attracted by the high-pitched musical notes, descend on the factory and enrage Lord Scrumptious, spoiling the pitch.

The next day, Truly nearly runs into the Potts family, who are taking their newly restored car "Chitty Chitty Bang Bang", and ends up in the village pond once again. Caractacus carries her ashore and the children invite Truly to join them on their picnic. Truly joins in the film's title song ("Chitty Chitty Bang Bang"), and during the picnic at the beach, Truly and the children declare their growing affection for each other ("Truly Scrumptious"). Truly has a conversation with Caractacus, and the children spy on the couple from afar, hoping they are falling in love. Later, at the children's prompting, Caractacus begins to tell a story about a nasty "Baron Bomburst" from "Vulgaria" who desires Chitty for himself.

=== Caractacus' story ===
In the story, after being cut off by the rising tide, Chitty and the family escape from Baron Bomburst's approaching gunship through Chitty's magical transformation into an amphibious motorcraft. Truly acknowledges Caractacus' devotion to the children and how well he's fulfilling the difficult role of a widowed parent, and Caractacus implies in return that the children still need a mother. Afterwards, safely back at her family mansion, Truly reflects on her developing love for Caractacus ("Lovely Lonely Man").

The Vulgarian spies make several more bungling attempts to steal their car, until, frustrated, the Baron decides to kidnap the car's inventor instead, but mistakes Grandpa for his son Caractacus. The family give chase in Chitty all the way to the Baron's castle in Vulgaria. Along the way, Chitty saves them again by magically sprouting wings to fly. In Vulgaria, a local Toymaker shelters them from the guards, and they learn that children have been forbidden by the Baron's wife, Baroness Bomburst. Meanwhile, soldiers have found Chitty and taken the car to the Baron.

Caractacus and the Toymaker investigate the castle, and Truly leaves to get food for the children, returning just in time to witness their capture by the sinister Child Catcher. Caractacus, Truly, and the Toymaker meet with the villagers' hidden children and plan their rescue mission ("Hushabye Mountain"). Truly and Caractacus disguise themselves as life-sized dolls to distract the Baron during his birthday party ("Doll on a Music Box"/"Truly Scrumptious") as the village children infiltrate the castle. Grandpa is freed, the Potts children are rescued, and the Baron is defeated. The family are hailed as heroes by the people of Vulgaria and fly home in Chitty.

=== After the story ===
As the story finishes, an awkward moment ensues when the children announce that 'Daddy and Truly were married and lived happily ever after'. Truly asks Caractacus if that is how the story ends, and, embarrassed, he drives Truly home without answering. Caractacus apologises, saying the children didn't understand how ridiculous it would be for a man in his situation to marry into a family of such wealth, but Truly is affronted, pointing out that were she to say such a thing, Caractacus would call her a snob. The Potts drive home glumly, but upon arriving, find that Lord Scrumptious has changed his mind about 'Toot Sweets' and intends to buy the idea from Caractacus. This newfound wealth removes the last remaining barrier to Caractacus admitting his love for Truly, and he hurriedly drives off in Chitty to find her. Truly is run off the road and into the duck pond for a third time, but as Caractacus rescues her, he admits to her that the children were right and there's nothing ridiculous about the idea of them getting married, and they kiss.

== Character ==
Truly Scrumptious is an intelligent, educated, practical woman, the daughter of a wealthy industrialist. She is pragmatic and proactive, and boldly opposes wrongdoing. She is portrayed as feisty and modern (for the Edwardian era in which the film is set), and is more than ready to spar verbally with Caractacus, take the initiative in their developing romance, stand up to her wealthy father, and indignantly reject social attitudes she disagrees with. She is also very warm and maternal towards the children.

The author of the original story, Ian Fleming, was known for using puns in the naming of his female characters. Although the names of the female characters in the James Bond series, by the same author, are usually racy double entendres, Truly Scrumptious is rather more innocent, as appropriate to a children's story. The pun on Truly is used in several ways in the recurring song of the same name "Truly Scrumptious".

In the film, a running gag is Truly running her car off the road into the same duck pond. The registration plate of Truly's motor car was CUB 1, an homage to the film's producer, Cubby Broccoli.

== Stage productions ==
Various actresses have now played Truly Scrumptious in stage productions of Chitty Chitty Bang Bang. These include the following in the order they have played the character.

Approximate Dates given where available

- Emma Williams - Originated the role in London (2002–2003)
- Caroline Sheen (2003–2004)
- Scarlett Strallen (2004–2005)
- Jo Gibb - Closed out the London Production (2005)
- Erin Dilly - Originated the role on Broadway and closed out the Production (2005)
- Marissa Dunlop - Originated the role in the National UK Tour (2005–2007)
- Rachel Stanley - Closed out the National UK Tour (2008)
- Kelly McCormick in the US National Tour in 2008–2009.
- Rachael Beck - Australian Tour 2012–2013.
- Carrie Hope Fletcher - UK Tour (4 May 2016 - 2 October 2016)
