= Posh! =

Song

"Posh!" is an up-tempo song from the 1968 musical film Chitty Chitty Bang Bang, written by the songwriting team of Sherman & Sherman. It makes reference to the myth that the word "posh" is an acronym for "Port Out, Starboard Home". In the film it is sung when "Grandpa Potts" (played by Lionel Jeffries) is being carried away in his outhouse. He sees the situation as serendipitous until he finally meets his kidnapper, Baron Bomburst, in Vulgaria.

== Use in stage musical ==
The song is also featured prominently in the 2002 and 2005 stage musical versions of the film. In the stage musical versions, Grandpa sings the song to the children in the family dining room and not while being kidnapped. An extra verse was also added to the beginning of the stage version, to tell the story of when Grandpa sailed out from Liverpool. The song is reprised a few times and is used as Grandpa's leitmotif.
