= To You =

To You may refer to:

- "To You" (1939 song), 1939 song composed by Tommy Dorsey with Benny Davis and Ted Shapiro
- "To You" (Earth, Wind & Fire song), 2005
- "To You", a 1979 song by Wings from Back to the Egg
- "To You" (그대에게), a 1988 song by Shin Hae-chul
- "To You", a 1989 song by Leslie Cheung
- "To You", a 2012 song in the Robin Schulz discography

== See also ==
- 2U (disambiguation)
- "To Ü", a 2015 song by Skrillex and Diplo
- You Too (disambiguation)
