= Mungojerrie and Rumpleteazer =

Fictional characters from T. S. Eliot's 1939 poetry book

- Mungojerrie and Rumpleteazer as depicted in Cats
- First appearance: Old Possum's Book of Practical Cats
- Created by: T. S. Eliot

Mungojerrie and Rumpleteazer are fictional characters in T. S. Eliot's 1939 poetry book Old Possum's Book of Practical Cats. The Jellicle cat duo are mischievous petty thieves who often cause trouble for their human family. Although originally published as part of a collection, the poem "Mungojerrie and Rumpleteazer" was published as a standalone book by Faber and Faber in 2018.

Eliot's book was adapted into the Andrew Lloyd Webber musical Cats. The roles of Mungojerrie and Rumpleteazer were originated by John Thornton and Bonnie Langford in the West End in 1981 and by Rene Clemente and Christine Langner on Broadway in 1982.

== Characteristics ==
Mungojerrie and Rumpleteazer are partners-in-crime, specialising in petty theft and mischief. In Eliot's original poem "Mungojerrie and Rumpelteazer", they are depicted knocking over Ming vases and stealing items from their human family. As they are identical twins, their owners never know which of the two is responsible for the mischief. Mungojerrie is also mentioned in the poem "Macavity, the Mystery Cat", where he is rumoured to be one of Macavity's agents. They live in Victoria Grove in Kensington, England.

== In "Cats" ==
While Rumpelteazer is suggested to be a male cat in Eliot's original poem ("... they were plausible fellows ..."), the character is portrayed as female in the musical. Vocally, Mungojerrie is meant to be played by a high baritone and Rumpleteazer by a high belter. Acrobatic skills are also required to portray the duo.

=== Musical number ===
The duo's eponymous song "Mungojerrie and Rumpleteazer" has been revised several times. In the original London production, the number was a singsong-style duet that was mainly composed in 12/8 time with a slower tempo and more jazz-like sound. When Cats opened on Broadway, the song was rewritten to be faster and more upbeat, alternating between vaudeville-style verses (in 4/4 time) and a "manic patter" section (in 7/8 time). The London version was later rewritten to incorporate some aspects of its Broadway counterpart. Mungojerrie and Rumpleteazer dance throughout their number and perform acrobatic feats, including their "trademark" two-person cartwheels.

A new setting of the song "Mungojerrie and Rumpleteazer" was also written for the original Broadway production, in which the song was sung by Mr. Mistoffelees, while the actors playing Coricopat (Rene Clemente) and Etcetera (Christine Langner) danced the song as "dolls" made of junk, brought to life, and appearing out of the boot (trunk) of a car through the magic of Mr. Mistoffelees. In 1987, the Broadway production was re-worked and the song was given back to the characters of Mungojerrie and Rumpelteazer, then played by Ray Roderick (who had formerly been the character Carbucketty) and Christine Langner, whose role of Etcetera was replaced by Rumpleteazer.

=== Costumes ===
Onstage, Mungojerrie and Rumpleteazer are usually costumed as orange, black and brown calico or tabby cats. When they perform their song, they have additional costume pieces: a vest and stockings for Mungojerrie; a garter belt, stockings and stolen jewellery for Rumpleteazer. In the original Broadway production, they wore baggy clown-like costumes seemingly made of various food wrappers as characters performing for Bustopher Jones.

=== Notable casting ===
==== Mungojerrie ====
The role of Mungojerrie was originated by John Thornton on the West End in 1981, and by Rene Clemente on Broadway in 1982. On screen, Mungojerrie was portrayed by Drew Varley in the 1998 film adaptation, and by Danny Collins in the 2019 film adaptation.

==== Rumpleteazer ====
Rumpleteazer was originated by Bonnie Langford on the West End in 1981, and by Christine Langner on Broadway in 1982. On screen, the character was played by Jo Gibb in the 1998 filmed version, and by Naoimh Morgan in the 2019 film adaptation.

== Cultural references ==
- The rock, pop, and skiffle band Mungo Jerry, most famous for their hit "In the Summertime", are named after the character.
- The character "Mingojerry Rample" in the film Serenity was a reference to the character Mungojerrie.
- A wax sculpture of Rumpleteazer is displayed at the Panoptikum Hamburg wax museum in Hamburg, Germany.
