= Chu-Chi Face =

1968 song from Chitty Chitty Bang Bang

"Chu-Chi Face" is a song from the 1968 musical motion picture Chitty Chitty Bang Bang. In the film it is sung by Gert Fröbe as Baron Bomburst and Anna Quayle as Baroness Bomburst. "Chu-Chi Face" is also featured prominently in the stage musical version of Chitty Chitty Bang Bang which premiered in London at the Palladium in 2002 and on Broadway in 2005 at the newly refurbished Foxwoods Theatre (then the Hilton Theatre). Brian Blessed and Nichola McAuliffe originated their respective stage roles at the London Palladium in 2002.

== About the song ==
As the baronial couple profess their love for one another, the Baron is simultaneously trying to kill his wife through a variety of barbaric means, yet his attempts always fail. Despite the obvious attempts on her life, the Baroness completely overlooks the fact that her husband wants her dead, even after he triggers an axe to fall on her head, a barbed spike to fall from the chandelier, and a trap door to open under her. The song is a humorous take on couples who maintain a façade of undying love, but have secretly grown to despise one another.

== Songwriters ==
The song was written by Robert B. Sherman & Richard M. Sherman (also known as the "Sherman Brothers").

The instrumental version of this song is called the traditional Vulgarian dance which is accompanied by a brass band in the waltz's rhythm.

A version titled "My Fluffy One" was used in a Yoplait commercial.
