= Hushabye Mountain =

Song from the 1968 film Chitty Chitty Bang Bang

Single by Dick Van Dyke
- A-side: "You Two"
- Released: 1968
- Length: 1:51
- Label: United Artists
- Songwriter: Sherman Brothers

"Hushabye Mountain" is a ballad by the songwriting team Robert and Richard Sherman. It appears twice in the 1968 Albert R. Broccoli motion picture Chitty Chitty Bang Bang: first as an idyllic lullaby by Caractacus Potts (Dick Van Dyke) to his children; and later when the children of Vulgaria have lost all hope of salvation. The song is also featured prominently in the 2002 and 2005 stage musical versions.

== Other versions ==
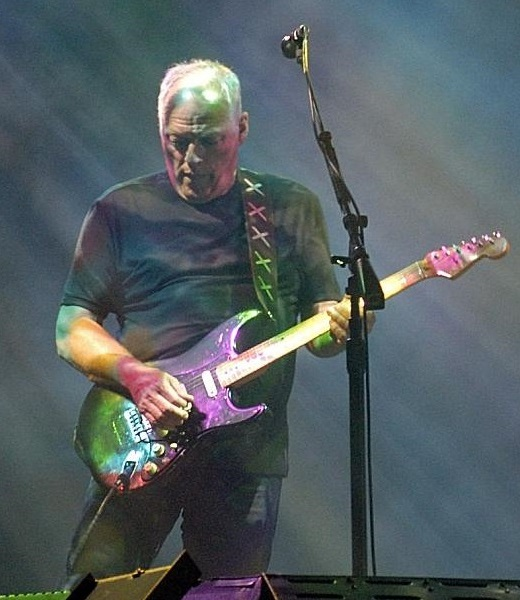
David Gilmour performed the song in 2001 for his concert DVD David Gilmour in Concert.

The song was first released in a version by Tony Bennett in June 1968, before the film and its soundtrack were released. "Hushabye Mountain" has since been covered by many artists. Bobbie Gentry, Julie London, Monty Sunshine and Wendy Craig also recorded the song in 1968. Alvin and the Chipmunks covered the song for their 1969 album The Chipmunks Go to the Movies.

Singer Stacey Kent recorded a version of this song for her 2001 album Dreamsville, British cellist Julian Lloyd Webber recorded the song on Unexpected Songs (2006), Hayley Westenra recorded a version for her album Hushabye (2013), Pink Martini and the von Trapps recorded a version for their 2014 collaboration album Dream a Little Dream, British comedian Alexander Armstrong performed it for his album debut A Year of Songs (2015), British comedian Jason Manford included the song on his album A Different Stage (2017), American Belz Hasidic singer Shulem Lemmer covered the song on his album The Perfect Dream (2019), English actress Eleanor Tomlinson recorded a version for her 2018 album Tales From Home, and English actress and television personality Amanda Holden recorded her version for her 2020 debut album Songs from My Heart.

Pink Floyd guitarist David Gilmour performed the song at his 2001-2 semi-acoustic solo performances, as captured on the David Gilmour in Concert DVD. In October 2017, Belly released a cover of the song, as part of a PledgeMusic campaign for their new album. It was also included on their 2018 EP Feel, released as a Record Store Day exclusive.

== In popular culture ==
- A version of the song was used in a Boots commercial for their Full Impact No.7 mascara, directed by Dougal Wilson.
- The song was recorded by Danny Elfman as the character Jack Skellington for the film The Nightmare Before Christmas (1993), but was ultimately not used.
- Dakota Fanning sang the song in Steven Spielberg's 2005 release of War of the Worlds.
- A cover by Maggie Szabo was used in a 2016 episode of Criminal Minds.
- In the Family Guy episode "Friends of Peter G", this song is playing when Peter tunes his car radio to the Lullaby Channel.
