= German submarine U-2 =

U-2 may refer to one of the following German submarines:

- SM U-2 (Germany), a unique submarine launched in 1908 that served in the First World War as a training submarine and was scrapped in 1919
  - During the First World War, Germany also had these submarines with similar names:
    - SM UB-2, a Type UB I submarine launched in 1915 and scrapped in 1919
    - SM UC-2, a Type UC I submarine launched in 1915 and sunk on 30 June 1915
- German submarine U-2 (1935), a Type IIA submarine that served in the Second World War and was sunk on 8 April 1944
- German submarine U-2 (1962), a Type 201 submarine of the Bundesmarine, launched in 1962
- German submarine U-2 (1966), a Type 205 submarine of the Bundesmarine that was launched in 1966 and sold in 1993

U-2 or U-II may also refer to:

- SM U-2 (Austria-Hungary), a U-1-class Austro-Hungarian Navy submarine
