= Jo Gibb =

British actress (born 1976)

- Born: JoAnn Gibb; 18 April 1976; Bo'ness, Scotland
- Occupations: Actress; dancer; singer
- Spouse: Alex Bourne

JoAnn Gibb is a Scottish theatre actress best known for her role of Rumpleteazer in the 1998 film of Andrew Lloyd Webber's Cats, and as the replacement Pearl the Observation Car in the original production of Starlight Express. She also played Belle in the 2006 UK Productions tour of Beauty and the Beast and appeared as Columbia in the 2000 UK national tour of The Rocky Horror Show.

== Career ==
Gibb first began her training at the Dance School of Scotland in Glasgow, then continuing in Epsom at Laine Theatre Arts.

Her first appearance in a London West End show was at the New London Theatre playing Rumpleteazer in Andrew Lloyd Webber's musical Cats, 1996–1997. She also understudied and played the roles of Demeter and Jemima in that same production. She subsequently played the role of Rumpleteazer in the 1998 Cats film.

In 2003 Gibb played the young Jesse Matthews in the West End production of Over My Shoulder – The Story of Jesse Matthews at the Wyndham's Theatre. Her performance in the role was reviewed as "pert and sweet if somewhat underpowered" by The Times. The Times praised Gibb's performance as Ruby in the 2005 musical Time's Up stating that she gave "a performance of enormous appeal".

Some of her other theatre work includes Belle in Disney's Beauty and the Beast, at the Dominion Theatre, London, and on tour; Columbia in the national tour of The Rocky Horror Show; and Pearl, in the final cast of the original London production of Starlight Express at the Apollo Victoria Theatre. Her work in The Rocky Horror Show was described as "impressive" in a review in the Coventry Evening Telegraph. The Evening Standard called her "musical queen Jo Gibb" in an article on Beauty and the Beast.

Gibb then appeared as Hell Let Loose and Rosalind in Beautiful and Damned in 2004 at the Lyric Theatre, also understudying and playing the lead role of Zelda Fitzgerald, and as Truly Scrumptious in the musical Chitty Chitty Bang Bang in 2005.

In 2014 Gibb played the part of Vera in the West End production of Songs for Victory at the Dominion Theatre.

She regularly performs around the world as one third of the singing group "The Patriot Girls".

== Personal life ==
Gibb is married to former Beauty and the Beast co-star Alex Bourne.
