= UU =

UU or uu may refer to:

== Arts and media ==
- Unseen University, in the fictional Discworld novels of Terry Pratchett
- Undead Unluck, a shorthand for the manga by Yoshifumi Tozuka
- The Mind Robber, a 1968 Doctor Who serial (production code UU)

== Businesses ==
- United Utilities (LSE stock symbol UU)
- Air Austral (IATA airline code UU)

== Language ==
- "uu", an old way of spelling the letter "w" in certain Germanic languages, including Old English
- The letter combination of uu

== Science and technology ==
- UUNET, Internet Service Provider commonly referred to as 'UU'
- Unique users, may be counted as part of web analytics in determining the popularity of a website
- UMTS air interface or "Uu interface", which links User Equipment to the UMTS Terrestrial Radio Access Network
- Unix-to-Unix, as in uuencode, a data transport encoding
  - .uu, a compressed archive file extension, associated with uuencode

== Universities ==
- Ulster University in Northern Ireland
  - Ulster University F.C.
- Union University in Jackson, Tennessee, United States
- University of Utah in Salt Lake City, Utah, United States
- Uppsala University in Sweden
- Utica University in Utica, New York, United States
- Utrecht University in the Netherlands
- Uttaranchal University in Uttarakhand, India

== Other uses ==
- Union of Utrecht (Old Catholic), a federation of Old Catholic churches
- Unitarian Universalism, a theologically liberal religion characterized by its support for a "free and responsible search for truth and meaning."
- U'u a war club from Marquesas Islands
- Uudenkaupungin Urheilijat, a Finnish basketball team, now known as Korihait

== See also ==
- VV (disambiguation)
- W (disambiguation)
- 2U (disambiguation)
- U2 (disambiguation)
