= You Two =

Single by Dick Van Dyke
- B-side: "Hushabye Mountain"
- Released: 1968
- Length: 2:47
- Label: United Artists
- Songwriter: Sherman Brothers

"You Two" is a song from the 1968 film musical Chitty Chitty Bang Bang. The song also appears in the 2002–2005 stage musical version. It was written by Robert and Richard Sherman. The song is sung by a single–widower father, Caractacus Potts (Dick Van Dyke) to his two twin children ("Jeremy" and "Jemima"). An inventor by trade, Potts sings the song against the backdrop of his eccentric inventor's workshop. The melody from this song was also used in counterpoint several times with the melody of the title song, "Chitty Chitty Bang Bang".

== Stage version ==
"Them Three" is a short reprise of "You Two" that was written for the stage musical in 2002. It is sung by "'Grandpa' Potts" and was also authored by the Sherman Brothers nearly thirty-five years after the song was originally written. It is not heard in the movie.

"Us Two" is also a short reprise crafted especially for the stage musical and written by the same writers. It is sung in the Vulgarian dungeons by Jeremy and Jemima, just before "Chitty Prayer", which is a short reprise of the title song. It is also not heard in the movie.

== External sources ==
- Sherman, Robert B. Walt's Time: from before to beyond. Santa Clarita: Camphor Tree Publishers, 1998.
