= Adrian Hall (actor) =

British actor

- Born: 1 January 1959 (age 67); Staines, Middlesex, England
- Occupations: Actor, co-director
- Years active: 1968–2002
- Known for: Playing Jeremy Potts in Chitty Chitty Bang Bang
- Spouse: Jayne Courtney
- Children: 4

Adrian Hall (born 1 January 1959) is an English former actor and co-director. He is best known for the film Chitty Chitty Bang Bang (1968), in which he portrayed the part of Jeremy Potts. He was later Principal of the Academy of Live and Recorded Arts (ALRA) until 2020, 2 years before ALRA closed.

== Filmography ==
Year	Title	Role	Notes
1968	Chitty Chitty Bang Bang	Jeremy Potts	Film debut
1970	The Man Who Had Power Over Women	Boy	Uncredited
1971	Jason King	Bell Boy	Episode: Variations on a Theme
1972	BBC Play of the Month	Fleming	Episode: Stephen D
1972	The Viaduct	Andy Smith	Miniseries
1972	Kadoyng	Billy	
1979	Two People	Dave	2 episodes
1983	Jemima Shore Investigates	Sid	Episode: The Crime of the Dancing Duchess
