= Yutu =

Yutu may refer to:

== Mythology ==
- Jade rabbit or Yùtù (Chinese: 玉兔), a rabbit in East Asian folklore that lives on the Moon with Chang'e
- Youdu or Yutu (Chinese: 幽都), the capital of the underworld in Chinese mythology

== Vehicles ==
- Yutu (rover), a Chinese lunar rover on Chang'e-3 mission
  - Yutu-2, the rover on Chang'e-4
- Foton Tunland Yutu, a mid-size pickup truck

== Places ==
- Yutu Linea, a geographic feature on Pluto named after lunar rover
- Coalsack Dark Nebula, or Yutu (Quechua: partridge), a partridge shaped nebula

== Other uses ==
- Tropical Storm/Typhoon Yutu, see List of tropical storms named Yutu

== See also ==
- Tu'er Ye
- Tu Yu
- Yu (disambiguation)
- Tu (disambiguation)
- U2 (disambiguation)
