= Chitty Chitty Bang Bang =

1968 musical fantasy film by Ken Hughes

- Theatrical release poster
- Directed by: Ken Hughes
- Screenplay by: Roald Dahl; Ken Hughes
- Additional dialogue by: Richard Maibaum
- Based on: Chitty-Chitty-Bang-Bang (1964 novel) by Ian Fleming
- Produced by: Albert R. Broccoli
- Starring: Dick Van Dyke; Sally Ann Howes; Lionel Jeffries; Gert Fröbe; Anna Quayle; Benny Hill; James Robertson Justice; Robert Helpmann
- Cinematography: Christopher Challis
- Edited by: John Shirley
- Music by: Sherman Brothers (songs); Irwin Kostal (score)
- Production companies: Warfield Productions Limited; Dramatic Features
- Distributed by: United Artists
- Release dates: 16 December 1968 (London premiere); 17 December 1968 (UK); 18 December 1968 (US)
- Running time: 145 minutes
- Countries: United Kingdom; United States
- Language: English
- Budget: $10 million or $12 million
- Box office: $7.5 million (rentals)

Chitty Chitty Bang Bang is a 1968 musical fantasy comedy film directed by Ken Hughes, produced by Albert R. Broccoli, and starring Dick Van Dyke, Sally Ann Howes, Lionel Jeffries, Gert Fröbe, Anna Quayle, Benny Hill, James Robertson Justice, Robert Helpmann, Heather Ripley and Adrian Hall. The film is based on the 1964 children's novel by Ian Fleming, with a screenplay co-written by Hughes and Roald Dahl.

Irwin Kostal supervised and conducted the music for the film based on songs written by the Sherman Brothers, Richard and Robert, and the musical numbers were staged by Marc Breaux and Dee Dee Wood.

The film was released in the United Kingdom by United Artists on December 17, 1968, and in the United States on December 18. It was a critical success and was one of the highest-grossing films in the US for 1969. The film's title song was nominated for an Academy Award and Golden Globe Award for Best Original Song, with a second Golden Globe nomination for Best Original Score.

== Plot ==
In 1910s rural England, two young children, Jemima and Jeremy, are enthralled by the wreck of a champion racecar. When they learn it is due to be scrapped, they vow to ask their father, widower and eccentric inventor Caractacus Potts, to save it. They shortly meet the wealthy Truly Scrumptious, who drives them home to report their truancy to Caractacus; she leaves angered when he rejects her concerns. To raise money for the car, Caractacus attempts to sell one of his inventions, a musical candy whistle, to the large Scrumptious candy company, which Truly is heiress to; however, the sound attracts a horde of dogs, ruining his sales pitch.

That evening, Caractacus goes to a carnival and attempts to raise money instead with an automatic hair-cutting machine. Fleeing a furious customer whose hair is accidentally ruined by the machine, Caractacus joins a song-and-dance act. He earns enough money in tips to buy the car and rebuilds it, naming it "Chitty Chitty Bang Bang" after its unusual engine sounds. For their first trip in the car, Caractacus and the children go to a beach to have a picnic. They are joined by Truly and enjoy their time together. Caractacus then tells the children a story.

=== Caractacus' story ===
Baron Bomburst, ruler of the land of Vulgaria, attempts to steal Chitty while it is stranded by high tide. The family escapes thanks to Chitty's sudden transformation into a boat, and Caractacus returns Truly to Scrumptious manor; she finds she has fallen in love with Caractacus. The Baron sends two spies to get the car. During one attempt, the spies accidentally kidnap Truly's father, Lord Scrumptious, and his valet; they take advantage of the blunder by disguising themselves as English gentlemen, hoping to kidnap Caractacus. Arriving at Caractacus' home, they mistake Grandpa Potts for him. The spies take Grandpa's outhouse with him inside using Bomburst's airship and the Vulgarian party flies away. When Caractacus, Truly, and the children follow them, Chitty sprouts wings and propellers, and Caractacus flies the car to Vulgaria.

Grandpa is taken to Bomburst's castle, where the Baron has imprisoned other elderly inventors, and ordered to make another floating car. When the Potts party arrives in the neighbouring village, they learn that children have been outlawed in Vulgaria as Bomburst's wife, the Baroness, abhors them. The local Toymaker hides the group in his shop from Bomburst's soldiers and Child Catcher. The Potts family and Truly disguise themselves as jack-in-the-boxes. Chitty is taken to the castle. While Caractacus and the Toymaker survey the castle, and Truly searches for food, the Child Catcher returns and kidnaps Jeremy and Jemima. The Toymaker takes Caractacus and Truly to a grotto beneath the castle where the townspeople have been hiding their children; there, Caractacus concocts a scheme to free Vulgaria from the tyranny of the Bombursts.

The next day during Bomburst's birthday, the Toymaker sneaks Caractacus and Truly into the castle disguised as lifelike dolls that sing and dance. At Caractacus' signal, the Vulgarian children swarm the banquet hall, overcome Bomburst's guests, and capture the Baron, Baroness, and Child Catcher. The Vulgarian townsfolk storm the castle, while Caractacus, Truly, and the Toymaker free Jemima and Jeremy. The group joins the fight against Bomburst's soldiers; Chitty comes to their aid, and Grandpa is rescued. With the battle won, the Potts party bids farewell to the Vulgarians and fly home to England.

=== After the story ===
As Caractacus' story concludes with the Bomburst regime toppled, the children ask if it ends with him and Truly married, but Caractacus does not answer. He later apologizes for his children when he takes Truly home, saying that the difference in their social status would make a relationship between them unfeasible, offending Truly. Returning home, Caractacus is surprised to encounter Truly's father Lord Scrumptious, who is revealed to have been Grandpa Potts' former brigadier. Lord Scrumptious offers to buy Caractacus' failed candies and market them to the public as dog treats. Overjoyed, Caractacus rushes off to tell Truly, whose house staff has already told her the news, and she meets him halfway. They confess their love for each other and agree to marry. As they return home, Chitty flies up into the sky, this time without wings.

== Cast ==
- Dick Van Dyke as Caractacus Potts
- Sally Ann Howes as Truly Scrumptious
- Lionel Jeffries as Grandpa Potts
- Gert Fröbe as Baron Bomburst
- Anna Quayle as Baroness Bomburst
- Benny Hill as Toymaker
- James Robertson Justice as Lord Scrumptious
- Robert Helpmann as Child Catcher
- Heather Ripley as Jemima Potts
- Adrian Hall as Jeremy Potts
- Barbara Windsor as Blonde at the carnival
- Davy Kaye as Admiral
- Alexander Doré as First Spy
- Bernard Spear as Second Spy
- Stanley Unwin as Chancellor
- Peter Arne as Captain of the Guard
- Desmond Llewelyn as 'Bill' Coggins
- Victor Maddern as the Junkman
- Arthur Mullard as Big Man (Cyril) at the carnival

Uncredited

- George Leech as Chitty's original driver
- Richard Wattis as Philips, the secretary at Scrumptious Sweet Co.
- Michael Audreson as Peter, the blonde Vulgarian boy

== Production ==
=== Background and development ===
After Ian Fleming had a heart attack in 1961, he decided to write a children's novel based on the stories about a flying car that he used to tell his infant son. He wrote the book in longhand, as his wife had confiscated his typewriter in an attempt to force him to rest.

The novel was initially published in three volumes, the first in October 1964, which was two months after Fleming's death. It became one of the best-selling children's books of the year. Albert R. Broccoli, producer of the James Bond films (which were based on novels by Fleming), read the novel and was not initially enthusiastic about turning it into a film, but the success of Mary Poppins (1964) changed his mind.

In December 1965, it was reported Earl Hamner had completed a script based upon the novel. The following July, it was announced the film would be produced by Broccoli, without Harry Saltzman, who was his producing partner on the James Bond films. By April 1967, Ken Hughes was set to direct the film from a screenplay by Roald Dahl, and Hughes subsequently rewrote Dahl's script. Further rewrites were made by regular Bond scribe Richard Maibaum.

=== Casting ===
Van Dyke was cast in the film after he turned down the role of Fagin in the 1968 musical Oliver!. The role of Truly Scrumptious was originally intended for Julie Andrews to reunite her with Van Dyke after their success in Mary Poppins (1964), but Andrews rejected the part because she felt it was too similar to Poppins; Sally Ann Howes, who had replaced Andrews as Eliza Doolittle in My Fair Lady on Broadway in 1958, was then offered the role, and she accepted.

Broccoli announced the casting of Dick Van Dyke in December 1966. The film was the first in a multi-picture deal Van Dyke signed with United Artists. Sally Ann Howes was cast as the female lead in April 1967, soon thereafter signing a five-picture contract with Broccoli, and Robert Helpmann joined the cast in May. Chitty Chitty Bang Bang was the first film for both of its child stars, Heather Ripley and Adrian Hall, who were cast after an extensive talent search.

=== Filming ===
Filming for Chitty Chitty Bang Bang began on 17 July 1967 and ended on 4 October 1967.

The weather was so miserable during the summer, that the film's production moved to Cap Taillat and the South of France, where they had to hide vineyards in the background.

Location in film	Image of location	Location of filming
Duck pond Truly drives into		Russell's Water, Oxfordshire, England
Potts Windmill/Cottage		Cobstone Windmill (also known as Turville Windmill) in Ibstone near Turville in Buckinghamshire, England
Scrumptious Sweet Company factory (exterior)		Kempton Park Waterworks on Snakey Lane in Hanworth, Greater London, England; This location now includes Kempton Park Steam Engines (a museum open to the public)
Scrumptious Mansion		Heatherden Hall at Pinewood Studios in Iver Heath in Iver, Buckinghamshire, England
Where Chitty passes a train		Longmoor Military Railway in Hampshire, England; This line closed in 1968 (the same year the film was released)
Beach		Cap Taillat in Saint-Tropez, France
Where the two spies put dynamite underneath Bucks Bridge in an attempt to destroy Chitty		Iver Lane in Iver, Buckinghamshire, England
Railway bridge where the two spies mistakenly kidnap Grandpa Potts		Ilmer Bridge in Ilmer, Buckinghamshire, England
White cliffs Chitty drives off		Beachy Head in East Sussex, England
White rock spires in the ocean and lighthouse when Chitty first flies		The Needles stacks and lighthouse on England's Isle of Wight
Baron Bomburst's castle (exterior)		Neuschwanstein Castle in Bavaria, West Germany
Vulgarian village		Rothenburg ob der Tauber, Bavaria, West Germany

=== Special effects and production design ===
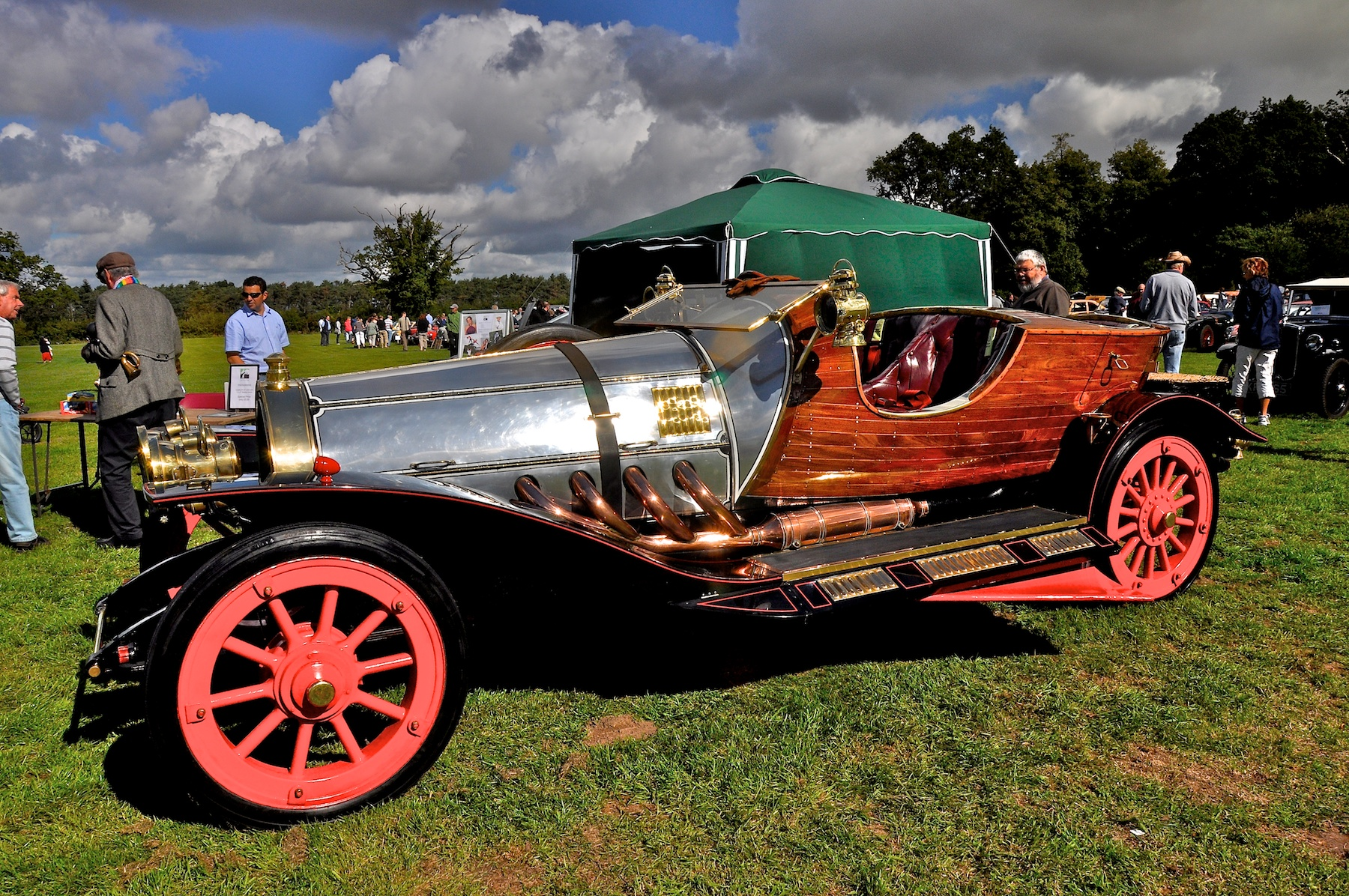
The main car used for filming carried a valid UK registration of GEN 11.

John Stears supervised the film's special effects, and Caractacus Potts' inventions were created by Rowland Emett. An article about Emett that appeared in Time magazine in 1976 mentioned his work on the film, saying that no term other than "'Fantasticator' [...] could remotely convey the diverse genius of the perky, pink-cheeked Englishman whose pixilations, in cartoon, watercolor and clanking 3-D reality, range from the celebrated Far Tottering and Oyster Creek Railway to the demented thingamabobs that made the 1968 movie Chitty Chitty Bang Bang a minuscule classic."

Ken Adam designed the film's titular car and six Chitty Chitty Bang Bangs were created for the film, though only one was fully functional. At a 1973 auction in Florida, one Chitty sold for $37,000, equivalent to $268,347 in 2025. The original "hero" car, in a condition described as "fully functional" and "road going", was put up for auction on 15 May 2011 by a California-based auction house. Expected to fetch $1 million to $2 million, it was purchased for $805,000 by New Zealand film director Sir Peter Jackson.

=== Music ===
The songs in the film were written by the Sherman Brothers, who had also worked as the songwriters for Mary Poppins. Poppins' musical supervisor and conductor Irwin Kostal would also work in the same capacity for this movie, as well as the choreographers Marc Breaux and Dee Dee Wood.

=== Airship ===
Chitty Bang Bang was an airship built for the film. It was intended to represent the airship of Baron Bomburst of Vulgaria. Although fictional in inspiration, it was a fully functional flying airship. Vulgaria, and the airship, is drawn from Roald Dahl's screenplay for the film, rather than Ian Fleming's original book.

Artistic impression of a 1904 Lebaudy airship.

The semi-rigid airship, whose appearance was designed by Ken Adam, was an approximate replica of a 1904 Lebaudy airship. The envelope was symmetrical fore-and-aft and short and deep compared to typical rigid airships, with pointed ends above the centre of the envelope that gave it the distinctive Lebaudy "hooked" appearance. The gondola was a long open truss structure beneath this and a crew basket beneath, with the typical Lebaudy feature of cruciform control surfaces at the rear of the gondola. The ends of the airship envelope were coloured with bands of the Vulgarian tricolor: black and purple on white. The flanks were adorned with a large black griffin, the arms of Vulgaria.

The airship was built in 1967 by Malcolm Brighton (Note: Later the pilot of the trans-Atlantic attempt balloon Free Life.) with the assistance of Giles Camplin, (Note: Later chairman of the Airship Heritage Trust, The Airship Association and vice chairman of the British Balloon Museum.) Arthur Eveleigh-de-Moleyns, 7th Baron Ventry (Note: Who had served in the Airship Branch of the Royal Air Force.) and Anthony Smith. It was only the second British airship to be built post-war, the first being the Airship Club's 1951 Bournemouth. It was also the first British airship to be mainly filled with helium rather than hydrogen, though it was topped up with hydrogen.

The envelope was 112 feet long, with a width of 30 feet and height of 44 feet, giving a volume of 37,000 cubic feet (1,000 m^{3}). A single Volkswagen Beetle engine of 40 hp drove two two-bladed propellers. The small Lebaudy control surfaces made the airship difficult to control in pitch.

During a flight by Malcolm Brighton and Derek Piggott, the airship was damaged when it collided with two sets of high-voltage power wires. The airship was repaired, but was subsequently destroyed when it was torn from its moorings during a storm.

== Release ==
United Artists promoted the film with an expensive, extensive advertising campaign, hoping to reproduce the success of The Sound of Music (1965), and it was initially released on a roadshow basis.

== Reception ==
=== Original release ===
Film critic Roger Ebert wrote, "Chitty Chitty Bang Bang contains about the best two-hour children's movie you could hope for, with a marvelous magical auto and lots of adventure and a nutty old grandpa and a mean Baron and some funny dances and a couple of [scary] moments." His review was not without criticism, stating that "these two hours of fun are surrounded by about another 45 minutes of soppy love songs, corny ballads and a lot of mushy stuff. This was apparently meant for the adults. At least, I didn't see any kids who looked interested." Despite this, he called the film "more colorful, moves faster, and has more believable children, who occasionally even have dirty faces. Best of all, there are a lot of incredibly complicated inventions and gadgets that you can really see working!"

Time stated the film is a "picture for the ages—the ages between five and twelve", and ended by writing that "At a time when violence and sex are the dual sellers at the box office, Chitty Chitty Bang Bang looks better than it is simply because it's not not all all bad bad." The review also said that the film's "eleven songs have all the rich melodic variety of an automobile horn. Persistent syncopation and some breathless choreography partly redeem it, but most of the film's sporadic success is due to director Ken Hughes's fantasy scenes, which make up in imagination what they lack in technical facility."

Renata Adler of The New York Times wrote that "in spite of the dreadful title, Chitty Chitty Bang Bang [...] is a fast, dense, friendly children's musical, with something of the joys of singing together on a team bus on the way to a game." She called the screenplay "remarkably good" and said the film's "preoccupation with sweets and machinery seems ideal for children". She summarized by saying, "There is nothing coy, or stodgy or too frightening about the film; and this year, when it has seemed highly doubtful that children ought to go to the movies at all, Chitty Chitty Bang Bang sees to it that none of the audience's terrific eagerness to have a good time is betrayed or lost."

=== Box-office ===
Although the film was the tenth-most popular at the U.S. box office in 1969, because of its high budget, it lost United Artists an estimated $8 million during its initial theatrical run. The same year, five films produced by Harry Saltzman, Battle of Britain among them, lost UA $19 million. All of these financial difficulties caused UA to scale back their operations in the UK. Van Dyke stated in 2025 that he was supposed to get 20 percent of the box office for the film, but said the cheques "never came."

=== Awards and nominations ===
Award	Category	Nominee(s)	Result	Ref.
Academy Awards	Best Song – Original for the Picture	"Chitty Chitty Bang Bang"; Music & Lyrics by The Sherman Brothers	Nominated	
Golden Globe Awards	Best Original Score – Motion Picture	Richard M. Sherman, Robert B. Sherman	Nominated	
Golden Globe Awards	Best Original Song – Motion Picture	"Chitty Chitty Bang Bang"; Music & Lyrics by The Sherman Brothers	Nominated	
Laurel Awards	Top Musical	Chitty Chitty Bang Bang	Nominated	

=== Later responses ===
On review aggregator website Rotten Tomatoes, the film has an approval rating of 70% based on 30 reviews, with an average score of 5.9/10. Metacritic, which uses a weighted average, assigned the film a score of 64 out of 100, based on 6 critics, indicating "generally favorable" reviews.

FilmInk stated: "It's a gorgeous looking movie with divine sets, a fabulous cast and cheerful songs; it's also, like so many late '60s musicals, far too long and would have been better at a tight 90 minutes." Film historian Leonard Maltin disagreed, giving the movie just 1.5 out of a possible 4 stars, and claiming "the film is to children's musicals what the Edsel was to cars, with totally forgettable score and some of the shoddiest special effects ever." Neil Jeffries of Empire gave the film four out of five stars, describing it as a "too long at well over two hours, but the effects are impressive for the time and the musical numbers zippy." In a 2024 respective, The Telegraph's Alex Larman called the film "a piece of harmless fun" that "was riddled with inexplicable darkness and chaos", noting the troubled production and the director's misgivings. He felt that the film "was generally met with disappointment, with the undistinguished songs and generally over-busy storyline being cited as the reasons for family audiences refusing to take this particular adventure".

The character of the Child Catcher has been seen by some as antisemitic. Aimee Ferrier said that the character "bears many anti-Semitic stereotypes, most notably, his large prosthetic nose, which appears like a caricature. Antisemitic depictions of Jewish people have often included men wearing tophats, something that is also sported by The Child Catcher."

== Soundtrack ==
The film's original soundtrack album, as was typical of soundtrack albums for musical films of the period, featured mostly songs with vocals, and few instrumentals. Some of the songs were edited to accommodate the time constraints of a standard 12-inch LP and help create a fluid listening experience.

The soundtrack has been released on CD four times. The first two releases used the original LP masters, rather than going back to the original movie masters to compile a more complete soundtrack album with underscoring and complete versions of songs. The 1997 Rykodisc release, which has gone out of circulation, included several short bits of dialogue from the film between some of the tracks, but otherwise used the LP master. On 24 February 2004, a few months after MGM released a two-disc "Special Edition" DVD package of the film, Varèse Sarabande reissued a newly remastered soundtrack album without the dialogue tracks, restoring the original 1968 LP format.

In 2011, Kritzerland released a two-CD set featuring the original soundtrack album, plus bonus tracks, music from the "Song and Picture-Book Album", the Richard Sherman demos, and six playback tracks (including a long version of international covers of the theme song). This release was limited to only 1,000 units. Perseverance Records re-released the Kritzerland double-CD set in April 2013, with new liner notes by John Trujillo and a new booklet by James Wingrove.

No definitive release of the original film soundtrack featuring the performances that lock to picture without the dialogue and effects can be made, as the original isolated scoring session recordings were lost or discarded when United Artists merged its archives. All that is left is the 6-track 70MM sound mix with the other elements already added in.

=== Songs ===
All lyrics are written by the Sherman Brothers; all music is composed by the Sherman Brothers.

No.	Title	Performer(s)	Length
1.	"You Two"	Dick Van Dyke, Heather Ripley & Adrian Hall	2:47
2.	"Toot Sweets"	Dick Van Dyke & Sally Ann Howes	5:38
3.	"Hushabye Mountain"	Dick Van Dyke	1:51
4.	"Me Ol' Bamboo"	Dick Van Dyke & Chorus	2:55
5.	"Chitty Chitty Bang Bang"	Dick Van Dyke, Sally Ann Howes, Heather Ripley & Adrian Hall	1:54
6.	"Truly Scrumptious"	Heather Ripley, Adrian Hall & Sally Ann Howes	4:00
7.	"Lovely Lonely Man"	Sally Ann Howes	4:22
8.	"Posh!"	Lionel Jeffries	2:44
9.	"The Roses of Success"	Lionel Jeffries & Chorus	2:51
10.	"Hushabye Mountain (Reprise)"	Dick Van Dyke & Sally Ann Howes	1:12
11.	"Chu-Chi Face"	Gert Fröbe & Anna Quayle	3:02
12.	"Doll on a Music Box/Truly Scrumptious (Reprise)"	Dick Van Dyke & Sally Ann Howes	2:27
13.	"Chitty Chitty Bang Bang (Finale)"	Dick Van Dyke & Sally Ann Howes	1:18

== Home media ==
Chitty Chitty Bang Bang was released numerous times on VHS, as well as on Betamax, CED, and LaserDisc. It was released on DVD for the first time on 10 November 1998, and a two-disc "Special Edition" package was released in 2003. On 2 November 2010, MGM Home Entertainment, through 20th Century Fox Home Entertainment, released a two-disc Blu-ray and DVD combination featuring the extras from the 2003 release, as well as new features. The 1993 gatefold LaserDisc release by MGM/UA Home Video was the first home video release of the film with the proper 2.20:1 Super Panavision 70 aspect ratio; it is also the only release that contains the original British theatrical trailer.

== Adaptations ==
=== Novelisation ===
The film did not follow Fleming's novel closely. A novelisation of the film written by John Burke was published at the time of the film's release. It basically followed the film's story, but there were some differences in tone and emphasis; for example, the novelisation mentioned that Caractacus had difficulty coping after the death of his wife and made it clearer that the sequences including Baron Bomburst were fantasy.

=== Comic book adaption ===
- Gold Key: Chitty Chitty Bang Bang. Gold Key Comics. February 1969.

=== Scale models ===
Corgi Toys released a scale replica of the titular vehicle with working features, such as pop out wings. Mattel Toys produced a replica with different features, while Aurora produced a detailed hobby kit of the car. Post Honeycomb cereal contained a free plastic model of Chitty inside specially-marked boxes, with cutout wings for the car on the back of the box.

=== PC game ===
An educational PC game titled Chitty Chitty Bang Bang's Adventure in Tinkertown was released in October 1996. It featured the titular car and required players to solve puzzles to win.

=== Musical theatre adaptation ===
A musical theatre adaptation of the film with music and lyrics by Richard and Robert Sherman and book by Jeremy Sams premiered on 16 April 2002 at the London Palladium in the West End. This adaptation features six new songs by the Sherman brothers that were not in the film. A Broadway production of the play opened on 28 April 2005 at the Hilton Theatre.

After closing in London, Chitty Chitty Bang Bang toured around the UK, and the UK Tour opened in Singapore on 2 November 2007. The Australian national production of the play opened on 17 November 2012. The German premiere took place on 30 April 2014.

=== Possible remake ===
In 2008, Telegraph reported Michael G. Wilson was conceding to a possible remake of the film.

In 2024, it was reported that a remake of the film was in early development, to be produced by Amazon MGM Studios and Eon Productions, the production company behind the James Bond movies. Matthew Warchus is set to direct the film with Enda Walsh as screenwriter. Warchus has expressed uncertainty regarding the inclusion of the Child Catcher character; "You have to be mindful and navigate the culture that you're in," he said.
