= Adrian Noble =

British theatre director (born 1950)

- Born: 19 July 1950 (age 76); Chichester, Sussex, England
- Occupation: Theatre director
- Known for: Royal Shakespeare Company artistic director and chief executive

Adrian Keith Noble (born 19 July 1950) is a theatre director, and was also the artistic director and chief executive of the Royal Shakespeare Company from 1990 to 2003.

== Education and career ==
Noble was born in Chichester, Sussex, England. After leaving Chichester High School for Boys, he studied at the University of Bristol, where he studied English. He began his professional career as a director at Drama Centre London. In 1976 he moved on to the Bristol Old Vic and worked at the same time for TV. From 1980 till 1981 he worked at the Royal Exchange Theatre in Manchester, producing the Duchess of Malfi, which won him the London Drama Critics' Award and the Circle Theatre Award (also for his production of Doktor Faust, and as Best Director for A Doll's House in 1980). He also directed the French version of his production of The Duchess of Malfi under a tent at the Carré Silvia Monfort in Paris (1981).

During his career, he received over 20 Olivier Award nominations. In 1980 he became assistant director at the Royal Shakespeare Company (RSC) where his first production was Alexander Ostrovsky's The Forest. In 1988 he was promoted to director, but in 1989 he took a break and left the company. He then worked for the Peter Hall Company, directing the Fairy Queen. He also worked at the Manhattan Theatre Club and the Kent Opera.

After this time away, Noble returned to the RSC in March 1991, this time as artistic director. In 1993, he won the Globe Award for Best Director for The Winter's Tale. His production of A Midsummer Night's Dream (1994) was popular enough to be revived two years later, and Noble also turned it into a film adaptation in 1996. He resigned from the RSC in 2002, stating that "it is now time for me to seek new artistic challenges".

He has also directed several successful London West End musicals including Chitty Chitty Bang Bang and The Secret Garden, and adapted Henrik Ibsen's play, Brand, for the London theatre in 2003. In 2007, he took Jean-Paul Sartre's Kean to Malvern, Bath and Brighton, before it transferred to the West End in the spring of that year. In 2008 he directed Hamlet for the Stratford Shakespeare Festival, and in 2010 Alcina for the Vienna State Opera. In 2014, he co-directed Kate Bush's Before the Dawn concert series.

== Personal life ==
Noble is married to actress and playwright Joanne Pearce. They have two children, Jude and Rose, the latter of whom works as a film and television producer.

== Theatre (selected productions) ==
- The Duchess of Malfi (Royal Exchange, Manchester, 1980)
- A Doll's House (1980)
- King Lear (Royal Shakespeare Company (RSC), 1982)
- Antony and Cleopatra (The Pit, London, 1983)
- A New Way to Pay Old Debts (The Pit, London, 1984)
- The Comedy of Errors (Theatre Royal, Newcastle-upon-Tyne, 1984)
- Measure for Measure (Theatre Royal, Newcastle upon Tyne, 1984)
- Henry V (RSC, 1984)
- The Desert Air (RSC, 1984)
- As You Like It (RSC, 1985)
- The Art of Success (RSC, 1986; Manhattan Theatre Club, 1989)
- Kiss Me, Kate (Old Vic, London, 1987)
- Three Sisters (Gate Theatre, 1990)
- The Thebans (Oedipus Tyrannos, Oedipus at Colonus, and Antigone) by Sophocles in translations by Timberlake Wertenbaker at the Swan Theatre (Stratford)
- The Winter's Tale (RSC, 1993)
- Macbeth (RSC, 1988, and 1993)
- A Midsummer Night's Dream (RSC, 1995)
- Romeo and Juliet (RSC, 1995)
- Il ritorno d’Ulisse in patria (Aix-en-Provence, 2000)
- Chitty Chitty Bang Bang (Palladium, London, 2002-2005)
- Pericles, Prince of Tyre (RSC, 2002)
- Brand (London tour, 2003)
- Kean (London, 2007)
- Macbeth (Metropolitan Opera, New York, 2008)
- Alcina (Vienna State Opera, 2010)
- The Captain of Köpenick (Royal National Theatre, London, 2013)
- Don Carlo (Bolshoi Theatre, Moscow, 2013)
- Otello (Vienna State Opera, 2019)

== Images ==
"Hänsel und Gretel", Vienna State Opera 2015
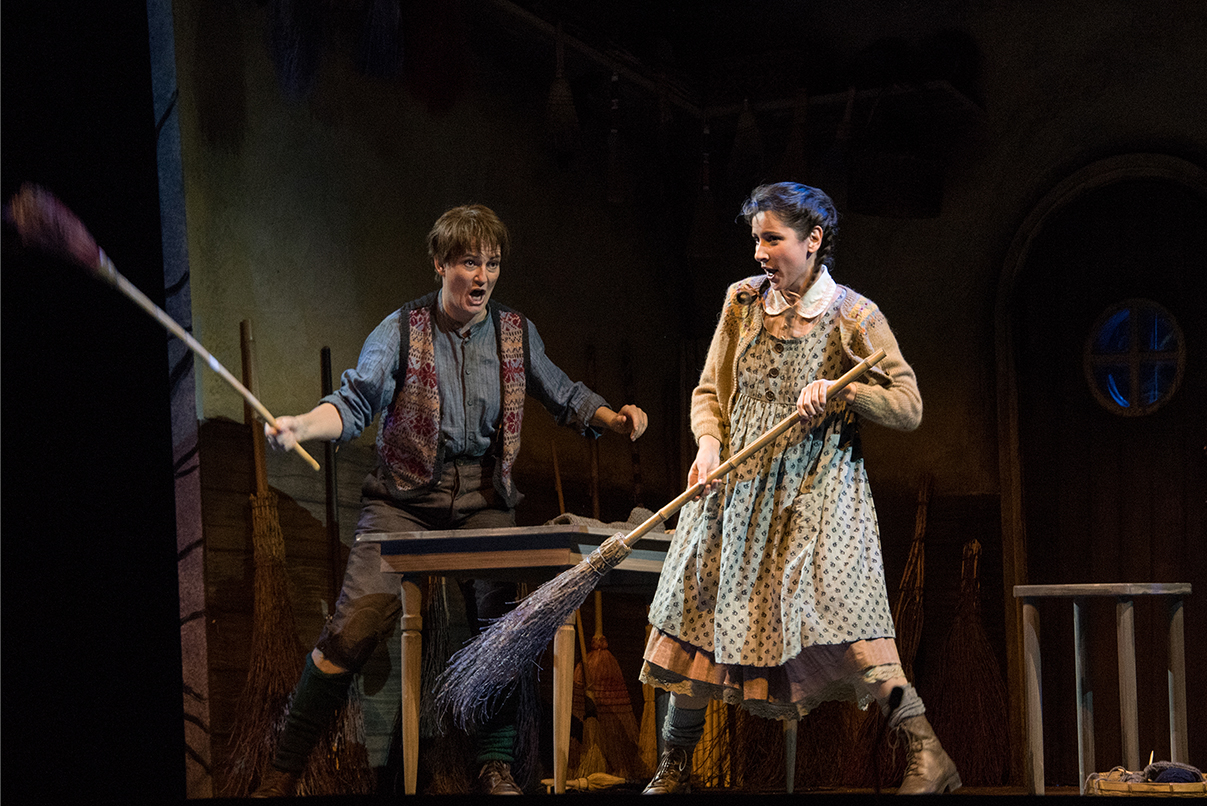

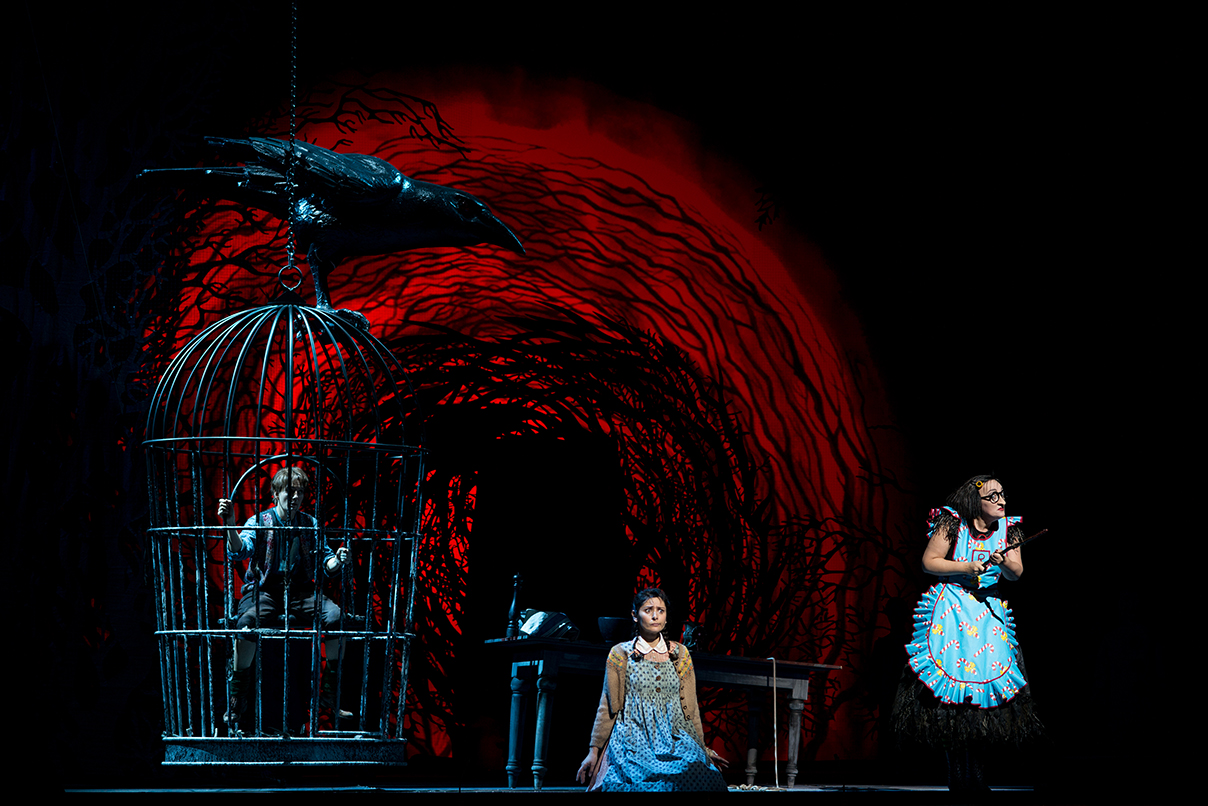

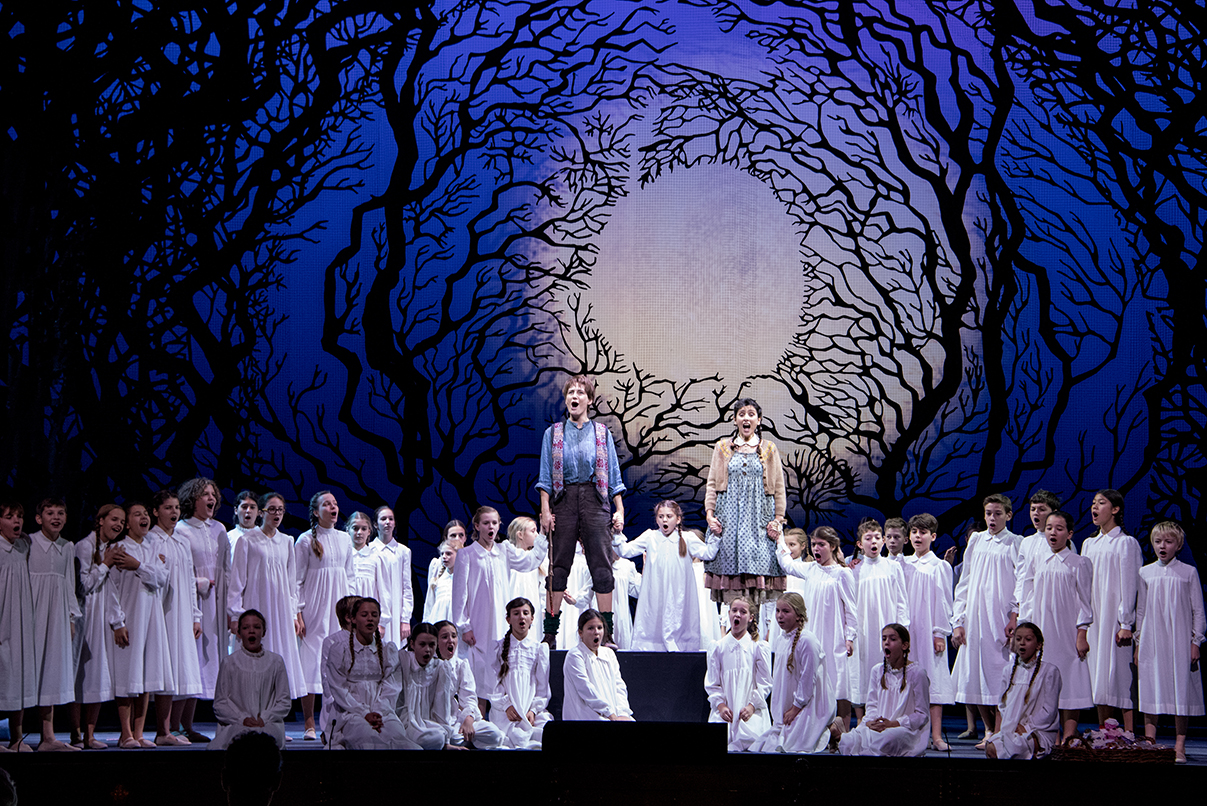

== Publications ==
- Noble, Adrian (November 2009). How to Do Shakespeare. London: Routledge. ISBN 978-0-415-54926-4.
