= Sally Ann Howes =

British actress and singer (1930–2021)

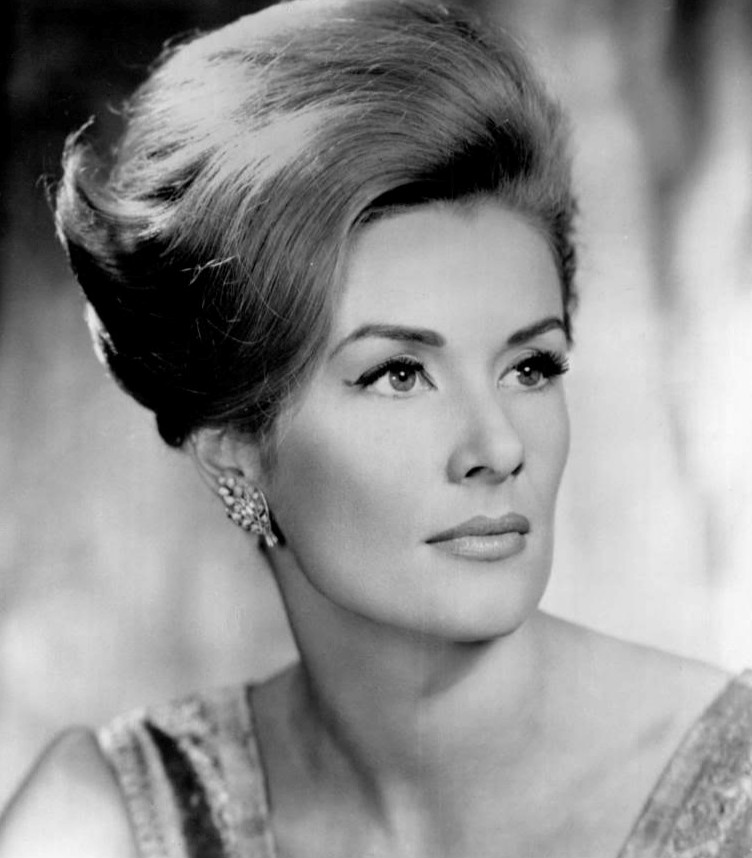
- Howes in 1965
- Born: 20 July 1930; St John's Wood, London, England
- Died: 19 December 2021 (aged 91); Palm Beach Gardens, Florida, U.S.
- Citizenship: United Kingdom; United States
- Occupations: Actress, singer
- Years active: 1943–2021
- Spouses: Maxwell Coker (m. 1950; div. 1953); Richard Adler (m. 1958; div. 1966); Douglas Rae (m. 1972; died 2021)
- Parent: Bobby Howes; Patricia Malone
- Relatives: Joseph Malone (great-grandfather)

Sally Ann Howes (20 July 1930 – 19 December 2021) was an English actress and singer, whose career on screen, stage and television spanned six decades. She was best known as a leading lady of musical theatre, both on the West End and on Broadway. She was nominated for a Tony Award for Best Lead Actress in a Musical for her performance in Brigadoon in 1963, and a Drama Desk Award for Outstanding Featured Actress in a Musical for James Joyce's The Dead in 2000. She was also known for portraying Truly Scrumptious in the 1968 film Chitty Chitty Bang Bang.

== Childhood and early film career ==
=== Family ===
Howes was born on 20 July 1930, in St John's Wood, London, the daughter of British comedian/actor/singer/variety star Bobby Howes (1895–1972) and actress/singer Patricia Malone (1899–1971). She was the granddaughter of Capt. J.A.E. Malone (died 1928), London theatrical director of musicals, and she had an older brother, Peter Howes, a professional musician and music professor. Her great-grandfather, Captain Joseph Malone, was awarded the Victoria Cross in 1854 at the Charge of the Light Brigade. Her uncle, Pat Malone, was an actor on stage, films, and television.

Howes moved to the family's country house in Essendon, Hertfordshire, for the duration of World War II. She was a show-business baby who lived a quiet, orderly childhood, where she grew up with a nanny and was surrounded by a variety of pets and her parents' theatrical peers, including actor/writer Jack Hulbert and his wife, actress Cicely Courtneidge, who had an adjoining house.

=== Thursday's Child ===
Her first taste of the stage was school productions, but as she came from a theatrical family, another family friend, an agent who was visiting the Howes family for dinner, became impressed with her and not long after suggested the young Sally Ann for a role in a film. Two hundred young girls had already been screen tested without success, and the producers were desperate to find a talented little girl to play the lead, and they asked her father to please rush in some pictures on the recommendation of the agent. The film, Thursday's Child (1943), was written by playwright and screenwriter Rodney Ackland, also a close neighbour to the Howes family, and it would become Ackland's directorial debut. Thursday's Child launched her career.

=== Ealing ===
A second film, The Halfway House (1944), in which she plays a major role as a teenager trying to get her parents to stay together, led to Howes being put under contract by Michael Balcon of Ealing Studios, and this was followed by many other film roles as a child actress, including Dead of Night (1945) with Michael Redgrave, Pink String and Sealing Wax (1945), Nicholas Nickleby (1947), My Sister and I (1948), and Anna Karenina (1948), with Vivien Leigh.

=== Rank ===
At the age of 18, the Rank Organisation put Howes under a seven-year contract, and she went on to make the films Stop Press Girl (1949), The History of Mr. Polly (1949) with John Mills, Fools Rush In (1949), and Honeymoon Deferred (1951). She married Maxwell Coker in 1950.

== Musical theatre ==
=== West End ===
On a teacher friend's recommendation, Howes took singing lessons – not only to bring out her natural talents, but in an effort to lower her speaking voice, which was quite high. While still in her teens, she made her first musical-comedy stage appearance in Fancy Free. In late 1950, she starred in a BBC TV version of Cinderella.

The same year, Howes accepted her first professional stage role in the Sandy Wilson musical Caprice. She terminated her contract with Rank, where she had been unhappy with the film roles she'd received, and with being "lent out" to other studios. She was finding gainful employment in television and radio, and looking to flex her singing talent, something Balcon and Rank had overlooked. Caprice was followed by Bet Your Life with Julie Wilson, Arthur Askey, and Brian Reece, with whom Howes was also simultaneously on radio. She participated in a TV version of The Golden Fool.

In 1953, she starred in the West End in the musical Paint Your Wagon with her father, Bobby Howes, which ran for 18 months. It was followed by Summer Song, also in the West End, firmly establishing Howes as a leading musical comedy star.

Then came her critically acclaimed performance in the stage drama A Hatful of Rain. In the early-to-mid-1950s, Howes's career expanded to include television appearances, modelling, commercials, and product endorsements.

Howes appeared as a comics character in TV Fun serial comics and annuals, as a young, wholesome teacher in the wild American West (at a time when Western TV shows were very popular). She appeared on many magazine covers, most notably Life (3 March 1958), when she took over Julie Andrews's role in My Fair Lady on New York City's Broadway.

=== Broadway ===
Howes was offered the part in My Fair Lady twice before: first, to join the musical's U.S. touring company (which she declined); and second, to replace Andrews on Broadway – which, at the time, conflicted with Howes's commitment to film The Admirable Crichton (1957) with Kenneth More. My Fair Lady creators Lerner and Loewe were persistent, though, and Howes accepted the third time, with a year's contract, and at a higher salary than Andrews. Howes was an instant hit as Eliza Doolittle.

In January 1958, Howes married Tony-winning composer Richard Adler (The Pajama Game, Damn Yankees). The following December, she appeared in Adler's musical television adaptation of O. Henry's short story The Gift of the Magi (1958), which Adler wrote expressly for her. Adler and Bob Merrill also collaborated on a musical version of W. Somerset Maugham's Of Human Bondage so Howes could play Mildred.

She appeared on many TV shows, including those of Perry Como and Dinah Shore, and Jack Paar's The Tonight Show in 1962. She appeared on The Bell Telephone Hour, The Kraft Music Hall, and The United States Steel Hour, and appeared on The Ed Sullivan Show four times.

When her contract in My Fair Lady ended, she returned to Britain to tape six 1-hour installments of The Sally Ann Howes Show, a variety show for ITV, the British commercial television network.

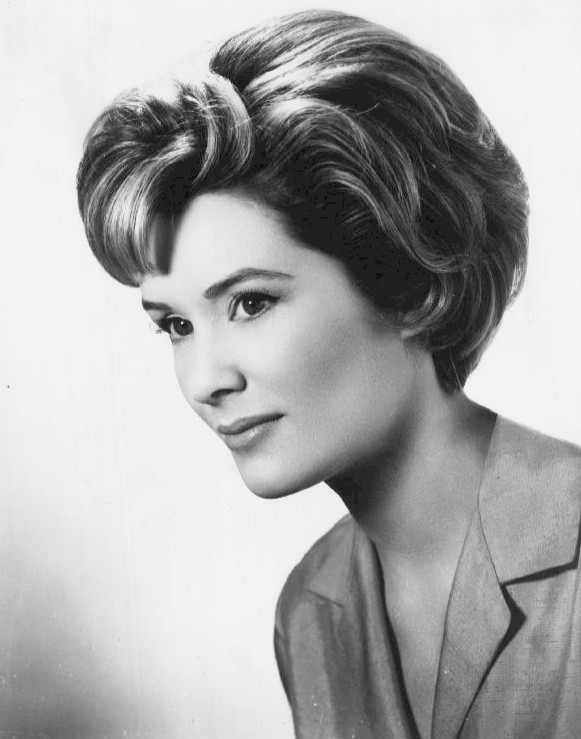
Sally Ann Howes in 1961.

Howes was invited to sing for US presidents Dwight D. Eisenhower, John F. Kennedy, and Lyndon B. Johnson. She became a frequent guest panellist on game shows and was known for her quick, spontaneous answers.

She returned to Broadway in 1961 in the short run of Kwamina, another musical Adler wrote for her, where she starred opposite Terry Carter. That same year, she starred in an hour-long television adaptation of Jane Eyre.

In 1962, she starred in a short revival of the musical Brigadoon at the New York City Opera, and received a Tony nomination, the first performer to be nominated for a revival performance. She recreated the role in a private White House performance at the invitation of President and Mrs. Kennedy.

In 1964, she starred on Broadway opposite Robert Alda and Steve Lawrence in the musical What Makes Sammy Run?, with over 500 performances.

She returned to familiar territory on TV in 1966 with Brigadoon opposite Robert Goulet, Peter Falk, and some of her Broadway cast; it won six Emmy Awards.

=== Chitty Chitty Bang Bang ===
Truly Scrumptious, as portrayed by Sally Ann Howes in the 1968 film, Chitty Chitty Bang Bang.

In 1968, Howes appeared in the children's film Chitty Chitty Bang Bang, starring as Truly Scrumptious, the beautiful aristocratic daughter of a confectionery magnate.

At her audition for this role, Howes was asked if she could dance. Her father had taught her to always say "yes" if a director asks if you can do something, and then if you can't do it, learn very quickly how to. She had a crash course in dancing lessons before filming a dance as a wooden doll. 150 extras watched her film this scene, which was completed in one take.

== Later career ==
=== Television ===
Chitty Chitty Bang Bang did not, however, restart Howes' film career or launch a career for her in episodic television despite several guest-starring roles in Mission: Impossible, Marcus Welby, M.D., Branigan, and The Men From Shiloh. Even the pilot Prudence and the Chief, which was a spoof on The King and I, did not get picked up as a TV series. In addition, film musicals were now failing at the box office, and that avenue was closed to her. As a result, she returned almost exclusively to the stage, appearing in only a few more films and television productions.

"I would have liked a film career, but I didn't pursue it – I just loved connecting with an audience," said Howes. "The theatre is a drug. The problem is that to be remembered, you have to do films."

=== Later theatrical career ===
In the 1970s, she toured Britain with The King and I and later the United States with The Sound of Music. After her debut with the Los Angeles Civic Light Opera in 1972 with The Sound of Music, she returned to Britain to star in the stage drama, Lover, which was written specifically for her.

In the 1970s and 1980s, she began to cross over from standard musicals to operettas. She performed two summers with the Kenley Players in Blossom Time and The Great Waltz, and she later added Franz Lehár's The Merry Widow and then two seasons of Stephen Sondheim's A Little Night Music at the New York City Opera. She also added the role of Gertrude in Hamlet to her repertoire. In the 1980s, she twice appeared in BBC TV's long-running Edwardian Music Hall programme, The Good Old Days.

She later said "The moment you hit 45... your career changes. You have to rethink everything, and you have to adjust. I was always aware of it because of the people I was brought up with. We saw careers go up and down and be killed off. I've never been prepared for anything, I've always jumped into the next thing, and therefore it's been a strange career. I've enjoyed experimenting. I've been so fortunate to be able to change – do cabaret, do concerts, or lectures."

In 1990, she debuted her one-woman show, From This Moment On, at the Edinburgh Festival and at a benefit for the Long Island AIDS Association at the John Drew Theatre in East Hampton, New York. Her last film was the 1992 miniseries Judith Krantz's Secrets. That marked her 50th year in film.

Her other projects included narrations of Cubby Broccoli, The Man Behind Bond on the release of the DVD Diamonds Are Forever in 2000, The Making of Chitty Chitty Bang Bang The Musical (2002), and her appearance in the documentary, After They Were Famous – Chitty Chitty Bang Bang (2004).

Except for occasional lectures, charity functions, and some Broadway openings, she was semi-retired, although she still hosted events or performed two or three times per year. Over the period September 2007 to January 2008, she toured the U.S. in the Cameron Mackintosh production of My Fair Lady, appearing as Mrs. Higgins. When she was not performing, she was an artistic advisor for the Palm Beach Theatre Guild, a non-profit organisation dedicated to preserving the Royal Poinciana Playhouse in Palm Beach, Florida.

== Personal life ==
Howes married Richard Adler in 1958, and adopted his sons Andrew and Christopher after their mother died in 1964. Howes and Adler divorced in 1966, though she continued raising the boys after their divorce. Howes recalled her marriage to Adler as a mistake stating, "We were both in show business but our values were very different. And his career was plummeting and mine was going great guns. And I made another mistake – I began turning down work because I thought if I was working and he wasn't, it would increase his insecurity." Christopher was a Broadway lyricist, and died of AIDS-related cancer in 1984 at the age of 30.

She was married to the English literary agent Douglas Rae from 1972 until his death in September 2021. According to her nephew, they were "inseparable".

=== Death ===
Howes died in Palm Beach Gardens, Florida, on 19 December 2021, at the age of 91.

== Legacy ==
In May 2023, a plaque was installed near Russell's Water, Oxfordshire, where the iconic pond scene was filmed for Chitty Chitty Bang Bang.

== Performances ==
=== Filmography ===
- Thursday's Child (1943) as Fennis Wilson
- The Halfway House (1944) as Joanna French
- Dead of Night (1945) as Sally O'Hara (segment Christmas Party)
- Pink String and Sealing Wax (1945) as Peggy Sutton
- Nicholas Nickleby (1947) as Kate Nickleby
- Anna Karenina (1948) as Kitty Scherbatsky
- My Sister and I (1948) as Robina Adams
- Fools Rush In (1949) as Pamela Dickson
- The History of Mr. Polly (1949) as Cristabel
- Stop Press Girl (1949) as Jennifer Peters
- Honeymoon Deferred (1951) (aka Due moglie sono troppe, Italy) as Katherine Fry
- The Admirable Crichton (1957) aka Paradise Lagoon (USA Title) as Lady Mary
- Chitty Chitty Bang Bang (1968) as Truly Scrumptious
- Death Ship (1980) as Margaret Marshall
- Broadway: The Golden Age, by the Legends Who Were There (2003) (documentary)

=== Theatre ===
- Caprice (Joan) – stage debut in Glasgow – written by Sandy Wilson
- Bet Your Life (Jane) – at the London Hippodrome, with Julie Wilson, Arthur Askey and Brian Reece – 1952
- Paint Your Wagon (Jennifer Rumson) at Her Majesty's Theatre, Haymarket – with father Bobby Howes – production ran for 477 performances over 18 months starting February 1953.
- Babes in the Wood (Robin Hood) – British pantomime – Golders Green Hippodrome – with Arthur Askey, holiday season 1954
- Romance in Candlelight (Margaret) – at Piccadilly – 1955 – 53 performances
- Summer Song (Karolka) – Princes Theatre, Shaftesbury Avenue, W.C.2 148 performances – directed by Charles Hickman – opened February 1956. Premiered at the Opera House, Manchester on 21 December 1955 before moving to the Princes Theatre on London's West End.
- A Hatful of Rain (Celia Pope) – Princes Theatre, Shaftesbury Avenue, W.C.2 – directed by Sam Wanamaker – 1956
- My Fair Lady (Eliza Doolittle) – Mark Hellinger Theater, Broadway – took over for Julie Andrews in February 1958 for one year.
- Kwamina (Eve Jordan) - 54th Street Theatre, 32 shows – 23 October – 18 November 1961
- Brigadoon (Fiona McLaren) – at New York City Center Light Opera Company – 1962
- Brigadoon (Fiona McLaren) – at New York City Center Light Opera Company – 28 January – 10 February 1963 (Tony Award Nomination)
- Brigadoon (Fiona McLaren) – Carter Barron Amphitheater, Washington, D.C. – 24–30 June 1963
- What Makes Sammy Run? (Kit Sargent) – 54th St. Theatre, 540 performances – 24 February 1964 – 12 June 1965
- My Fair Lady – (Eliza Doolittle) – Melody Top Theatre, Chicago – July 1964
- My Fair Lady – (Eliza Doolittle) – Melody Top Theatre, Chicago – July 1965
- Camelot (Guenevere) – St. Louis Municipal Opera (aka The Muny) – summer 1969
- My Fair Lady (Eliza Doolittle) – Kenley Players – Florida theatre – 23 December 1969 – 4 January 1970
- Blossom Time (Mitzi Kranz) – Morris Mechanic Theatre, Baltimore. Also starred Earl Wrightson and Lois Hunt – 1970
- Blossom Time (Mitzi Kranz) – Kenley Players, Memorial Hall in Dayton, Ohio – (one week) – August 1970.
- The Sound of Music (Maria) – Kenley Players – 1970 or 1971
- The Great Waltz (Resi) – Kenley Players, Packard Music Hall, Warren, Ohio – August 1971
- The Sound of Music (Maria) – The Los Angeles Civic Light Opera – 1972
- The Sound of Music (Maria) – San Francisco Light Opera Association – 1972
- Lover (Suzy Martin) – with Jeremy Hawk, Derren Nesbitt and Max Wall – Theatre Royal, Brighton – week of 11–17 February 1973 – thriller
- The King and I (Anna Leonowens) – British tour. Also starred Peter Wyngarde – 1973.
- Man and Superman (Ann Whitefield) – with Denis Quilley – 1973
- The King & I (Anna Leonowens) - the Dorothy Chandler Pavilion – with Ricardo Montalbán – April 1974.
- I Do! I Do! – Cherry County Playhouse, Traverse City, MI. – 18 August 1976
- Goodbye Charlie – 1976?
- Robert and Elizabeth (Elizabeth) – Yvonne Arnaud Theatre in Guildford – also starred Jeremy Brett – 22 December 1976 – 29 January 1977.
- Robert and Elizabeth (Elizabeth) – O'Keefe Center, Toronto – March 1977
- Hans Anderson (Jenny Lind) – with Tommy Steele. 10-week run at the London Palladium – 17 December 1977 – 28 February 1978.
- The Sound of Music (Maria) – 1978 USA touring company
- Hamlet (Queen Gertrude) – New Shakespeare Company, Gardner Arts Centre, Brighton. Opened 9 May 1983.
- The Merry Widow – with Barry Clark – 1986
- Noël Coward's Semi-Monde – Royalty Theatre, London – 13 September 1989
- A Little Night Music (Desiree) – New York City Opera, Lincoln Center – 7 November 1990
- From This Moment On – one woman show – 1990.
- A Little Night Music (Desiree) – New York City Opera, Lincoln Center – 1992
- Cinderella (Fairy Godmother) – New York City Opera, Lincoln Center, 9–21 November 1993
- Cinderella (Fairy Godmother) – New York City Opera, Lincoln Center, 15 November 1995 – with Jane Powell and Jean Stapleton
- Where's Charley? (Charley's Aunt) – 13–16 August 1998
- James Joyce's The Dead world premier (Aunt Julia) – 14 December 1999 – 16 April 2000
- Dear World (Countess Aurelia) – 16 November – 10 December 2000
- My Fair Lady (Mrs. Higgins) – USA touring company – 12 September 2007 – 20 January 2008.

=== Television films, miniseries, series, musicals and specials ===
Early TV appearances included a guest appearance in Cafe Continental with her father when they faced the camera together for the first time. Other appearances included Kaleidoscope, and her series titled Short and Sweet with Harry Jacobson at the piano. She appeared in the 1951 Festival of Musical Production, written for her and titled The Golden Year.

- Cinderella (1950) TV, BBC, 26 December 1950
- The Golden Year (1951) TV, BBC, as Susan Halliday
- Hallmark Hall of Fame playing Della Young in the episode "The Gift of the Magi", 9 December 1958
- The Sally Ann Howes Show (6 variety shows, UK) 1960
- The Fifth Column (1960)
- Jane Eyre (1961)
- Play of the Week in the episode "After Hours", 1961 with Christopher Plummer
- Play of the Week in the episode "The Old Foolishness", 6 March 1961
- The Sally Ann Howes Special, a General Motors Special, A CBS Special for the opening of Lincoln Center, 23 September 1962
- Brigadoon, 1966
- Prudence and the Chief, 1970, TV pilot
- The Hound of the Baskervilles, 1972
- Female Artillery, 1973 as Sybil Townsend
- The Good Old Days, BBC TV, two appearances in the 1980s
- Great Performances, playing herself in "An Evening with Alan Jay Lerner", 23 and 24 October November 1989
- Judith Krantz's "Secrets", 1992, miniseries
- After They Were Famous, playing herself in the episode "Chitty Chitty Bang Bang", 24 December 2004

=== Television guest appearances ===
- "Cafe Continental" – variety show 1947–1953. Appeared with her father as a guest star.
- "Saturday Spectacular" / "Startime" – variety show broadcast from Prince of Wales Theatre – 1950s?
- "Have You A Camera?" playing "Herself" with Royal photographer, Baron – mid-1950s.
- "Toast of the Town" playing "Herself" (episode No. 11.20) 9 February 1958, (episode No. 17.37) 21 June 1964, (episode No. 19.12) 28 November 1965, (episode No. 20.23) 12 February 1967
- "Sunday Night at the London Palladium" – March 1959
- "The Perry Como Show" – 17 May 1958, 15 November 1958, 3 June 1959
- "The Bell Telephone Hour" in episode: "A Night of Music" 9 October 1959, "Holiday in Music" 30 September 1960, "Music hath Charms" 20 January 1961, "A Measure of Music" 19 January 1962
- "Dinah Shore Show" -"Herself" – 8 May 1960
- "The United States Steel Hour" in episode: "The Leonardi Code" (episode No. 8.19) 17 May 1961
- "To Tell the Truth" – various appearances 1962–1965, Daytime and nighttime versions
- "Password" – various appearances 1962–1965, Daytime version
- "The Match Game" – various appearances 1963–1964, Daytime version
- "I've Got a Secret" playing "Guest Panelist" 24 June 1963
- "The Merv Griffin Show" – 1963 or 1964
- "You Don't Say!" (gameshow) – 1963, 1964 or 1965
- "The Price Is Right" – (with host Bill Cullen) – "Guest Star" – 1963 or 1964
- "The Miss U.S.A. Pageant" (hostess) – 4 June 1965
- "The Miss Universe Beauty Pageant" (hostess) – 24 July 1965
- "Fanfare" playing "Herself" 28 August 1965
- "Bob Hope presents the Chrysler Theatre" playing "Allison Lang" in episode: "The Enemy on the Beach" (episode No. 3.10) 5 January 1966
- "Run for Your Life" playing "Rhona" in episode: "The Savage Machines" (episode No. 1.29) 2 May 1966
- "The Dean Martin Show" playing "Herself" 6 April 1967
- "Everybody's Talking" playing "Guest Panelist" 22–26 May 1967
- "What's My Line?" playing – various appearances 1968–1970, Daytime version
- "The Hollywood Palace" playing "Herself" 5 April 1969
- "This Is Tom Jones" playing "Herself" 22 May 1969
- "Mission: Impossible" playing "Beth" in episode: "Fool's Gold" (episode No. 4.5) 26 October 1969
- "It Takes Two" – "Guest Panelist" – 25 May 1970
- "The Hollywood Squares" – "Guest Panelist" – 23–27 November 1970
- "Bracken's World" playing "Isabel Blue" in episode: "Miss Isabel Blue" (episode No. 2.15) 25 December 1970
- "The Virginian" playing "Martha Clayton" in episode: "Tate, Ramrod" (episode No. 9.20) 24 February 1971
- "The Virginia Graham Show" – guest appearance approx. 1971
- "Sesame Street" - guest star. 1 February 1972
- "Marcus Welby, M.D." in episode: "The Day After Forever" (episode No. 4.23) 27 February 1973
- "Give Us a Clue" (gameshow) - 4 appearances 1988-1989
- "The Rosie O'Donnell Show" playing "Herself" 19 October 1998
- "Theatre Talk" – regarding "James Joyce's The Dead" – 20 January 2000

=== Radio ===
In the late 1940s and early 1950s, she appeared on many radio programmes including: Ignorance is Bliss, Geraldo's Open House, Taxi with Jerry Verno, Desert Island Discs, Talk Yourself Out of This, and she appeared twice on the Calling All Forces show.

- Arthur's Inn – radio variety program with Arthur Askey & Brian Reece – June 1952
- Marle Becker's "Out-FM" show, heard on WBAI-FM (99.5) (or on the internet at Home) from 6:30 to 7:30 pm. – 1 October 2000

=== Other live performances ===
- Royal Variety Performance – at the Victoria Palace Theatre – 29 October 1951
- London Palladium "Midnight Cavalcade 1954" – A Gala Night of World-Famous Stars in aid of the Actors' Orphanage, the Charitable Funds of the Grand Order of Water Rats & the J.N.F. Charitable Trust – Thursday, 18 March 1954
- London Palladium "Night of 100 Stars" – A Midnight Revue in aid of the Actors' Orphanage – Thursday, 23 June 1955
- Grand opening of the Heinz Hall in Pittsburgh, PA – 21 September 1971
- "Golden Gala" – London Palladium – A musical spectacular from the London Palladium to mark the 50th anniversary of Equal Voting Rights For Women. Princess Margaret was the guest of honour. 2 July 1978
- "Cinderella's Star Night" – Charity gala at the Prince Edward Theatre, 31 January 1982.
- "A Royal Night of One Hundred Stars" – one night performance at the NT Olivier Theatre – in aid of the "Save the Children Fund." 17 March 1985 (Sunday 8:00 pm)
- Memorial service for Alan J. Lerner – was a speaker/singer at St. Paul's Church, Covent Garden – 1 September 1986
- A Celebration of Shakespeare "Hamlet Travestie" – Action Against Aids, at the Sadlers Wells Theatre – Howes sang "So in Love" from "Kiss Me Kate" – 12 April 1987
- "An Evening With Alan Jay Lerner" – Theatre Royal, Drury Lane. (Recorded Live – recordings available). – 7 June 1987 (Sunday)
- "An Evening With Alan Jay Lerner" – Opera House, Manchester – 27 March 1988
- Being Alive – A Celebration of the Genius of Stephen Sondheim – at the Drury Lane Theatre, on 4 June 1989, 7:00 pm
- "Let's Do it" – all star celebration of Noël Coward/Cole Porter – 1 night event at Barbican Centre Concert Hall – 19 October 1989
- "Kids at Heart" – at the London Palladium – a fundraising evening for Medical Aid for Free Romania. – 20 January 1991
- "A Glamorous Night with Evelyn Laye and Friends" – one-night gala at the London Palladium – Sunday, 26 July 1992
- "A Time To Start Living" – A Celebration of the great Elizabeth Welch – Shaftsbury Lyric Theatre – A World Aid's Day Gala, a fundraising event for Crusaid – 6 December 1992
- "Jack in Review" – charity gala concert in tribute to Jack Tinker, the theatre critic with the Daily Mail newspaper. London Palladium, London. Friday, 28 February 1997, 2:30 pm. Howes sang "Alice Blue Gown."
- Cabaret at the Algonquin Hotel's Oak Room in New York City – late 1990s – the cabaret may have been the inspiration for her album "Mary Lea, Songs My Sister Loved and Sang."
- "A Cultural Affair" – New York Pops Gala, A Cultural Affair honours New York City Commissioners of Cultural Affairs Schuyler Chapin – 15 May 2000
- Broadway Honours BMI Composer Lehman Engel – Merkin Concert Hall – hosted by Sally Ann Howes. 2 April 2001
- The 12th Annual New York Cabaret Convention – "A Nightingale Sang in Berkeley Square" – 24 October 2001 – was booked for but cancelled due to the events of 9/11.
- Lansing Town Hall Celebrity Lecture Series – guest lecturer in "The Best of Broadway" – Lansing, Michigan – Monday, 20 May 2002
- Age Cannot Wither – Rosemary Harris, Sally Ann Howes and Hayley Mills appeared in A Benefit for Shakespeare Globe Centre USA called "Coward X2"- presented at University Club, 1 West 54th Street, in New York City. – 17 March 2003 (Monday)
- Town Hall Celebrity Lecture Series, 11:30 am, Michigan League Ballroom (University of Michigan) – guest lecturer in "The Best of Broadway" – Wednesday, 15 October 2003
- Port Huron Town Hall – guest lecturer in "The Best of Broadway" – Monday, 8 December 2003
- The 16th Annual New York Cabaret Convention – Mabel Mercer Foundation – "Music From the Movies" – 20 October 2005
- 23rd Annual S.T.A.G.E. event – Side by Side by Side by Side by Sondheim – 10 & 11 March 2007, Wilshire Theatre, Los Angeles.
- "I'd Like To Teach The World to Sing" – charity gala concert in tribute to vocal coach Ian Adam at Her Majesty's Theatre London, 24 February 2008. Howes sang "Send In The Clowns."

=== Discography ===
She has several Broadway, West End, TV and Film cast albums available including:

- Bet Your Life (1952)
- Paint Your Wagon (1953)
- Romance in Candlelight (1955) – Original 78 recorded 15 October 1955 in London.
- Summer Song (1956)
- Gift of the Magi (1958)
- Kwamina (1961)
- What Makes Sammy Run? (1964)
- Brigadoon (1966)
- Chitty Chitty Bang Bang (1968)
- Hans Andersen (1977)
- I Remember Mama (1985)
- Great Expectations (1995)

She can also be found on the albums The Best of the Telephone Hour, Cole Porter: A Remembrance (1965), An Evening With Alan Jay Lerner (1987), and the three Christmas songs she recorded, Toyland, It Came Upon A Midnight Clear, and O Little Town of Bethlehem can be found reissued each year on various compilation Christmas albums. The last known recording she made was a gift album for a party for a friend, called Mary Lea, Songs My Sister Loved & Sang (1998) for which she held the production rights and copyright.

=== Product endorsements and modelling ===
In the late 1940s and early 1950s, Sally Ann Howes lent her face to many products, a few of which are mentioned here:

- Blend-rite Hair Clips (late 1940s)
- Britvic Gold Pure Juice Cocktail (1953) – the ad includes a photo of Sally Ann Howes and mentions she starred in the new Jack Hylton musical Paint Your Wagon.

She did some modelling in the 1950s and early 1960s, and can be found in the following publications:

- Weldons Knitting Booklet No. 319 (c. 1953) — the ad includes a photo of Sally Ann Howes modelling a jersey and mentions she starred in the new Jack Hylton musical Paint Your Wagon.
- TV Guide ( 13–19 October 1962) – "Sally Ann Howes With Fall Fashions" (pages 22–24)

Preceded by Originator of role	Actress to portray Truly Scrumptious; 1968	Succeeded by Emma Williams
