= Caractacus Pott =

Fictional character

Caractacus Potts
- Chitty Chitty Bang Bang character
- First appearance: Chitty Chitty Bang Bang
- Created by: Ian Fleming
- Portrayed by: Dick Van Dyke

In-universe information
- Nationality: British (book); American (film)

Caractacus Pott (Caractacus Potts in the film adaptation) is the main protagonist of Ian Fleming's novel Chitty-Chitty-Bang-Bang and its film adaptation. The film version of the story makes several changes to his character.

In the original 1964 book, Chitty-Chitty-Bang-Bang: The Magical Car, Pott is a Royal Navy Commander and eccentric inventor who lives with his wife Mimsie and their twin eight-year-old children, Jeremy and Jemima, on their hilltop farm. He and his family are mentioned in the sequel books before appearing in the final one: Chitty Chitty Bang Bang: Over the Moon, where they assist the Tooting family in stopping Tiny Jack.

The filmmakers, including author/screenwriter Roald Dahl, altered many of the book's details for the 1968 film musical version of Chitty Chitty Bang Bang, in which Caractacus is portrayed by Dick Van Dyke. The name Pott was changed to Potts and the character of Mimsie was written out as it was felt a burgeoning romance would serve the story better. Caractacus' film character is a widower who develops a romantic relationship with Truly Scrumptious, the daughter of the sweets magnate, Lord Scrumptious. The film also expunged the naval commander part of his life. His other inventions as seen in the film were designed and created by the craftsman Rowland Emett and are on display at Mid-America Science Museum.

In the movie, Caractacus' wife has died leaving him as a single parent to their two children Jeremy and Jemima. The daily routine is that Caractacus invents things to sell for his family's sustenance, while Jeremy and Jemima go to school or play in a garage owned by a neighbour, Mr. Coggins. The children discover and grow fond of a decrepit racing car which had been involved in a high-speed road race accident. When a dog and a child ran into the road from the cheering crowd, it had crashed down an embankment where it caught fire and exploded. The children persuade their father to restore it.

A stage musical based on the film premiered in London's West End in 2002, with Caractacus Potts played by Michael Ball. The role has since been played on stage in the West End by Gary Wilmot (also on tour), Jason Donovan, Brian Conley (also on tour); and on tour by Tim Flavin, Joe McFadden, Craig McLachlan, Kevin Kennedy (after playing the Childcatcher), Matt Baker, Aled Jones, Darren Bennett, Jon Robyns, Jason Manford and Lee Mead. For the 2005 Broadway production the role was played by Raúl Esparza. For the 2012 Australian production the role was played by David Hobson. Since 2024, the character was played by Ore Oduba and Adam Garcia.
