= The Knack discography =

- Studio albums: 7
- Live albums: 3
- Compilation albums: 5
- Singles: 16
- Video albums: 3

The discography of American power pop band the Knack consists of 7 studio albums, 3 live albums, 5 compilation albums, 16 singles, and 3 video albums. The band first gained success with their debut single, "My Sharona", first released on the band's debut studio album, Get the Knack, on the 11th of June, 1979, before being released as a separate single on the 18th. The single reached number one on the Billboard Hot 100 and become the band's signature hit, while the album it came from also hit number 1 on the Billboard 200. The second single, "Good Girls Don't" was also a decent success, hitting number 11 on the Billboard Hot 100 and reaching number 1 in Canada.

The band's second studio album, ...But the Little Girls Understand, was released on February 15, 1980, and charted much less than its predecessor, only hitting number 15 on the Billboard 200. Meanwhile, the album's lead single, "Baby Talks Dirty", only hit number 38 on the Billboard Hot 100, while the second and final single from the album, "Can't Put a Price on Love", hit number 62. The band's third studio album, Round Trip, released in October 1981, fared even lower, hitting number 93, with its lead single, "Pay the Devil (Ooo, Baby, Ooo)", charting at number 67, and the second single, "Boys Go Crazy" not hitting the Billboard Hot 100 at all. The band broke up a year later, in 1982.

Four years after their initial breakup, in 1986, the band reunited, and five years later, on January 15, 1991, the band released their fourth studio album, Serious Fun. The album was the first from the band to not chart on the Billboard 200 at all, and the only chart the album hit was the Canadian Albums chart. The band then break up again in 1992, although they reunited again in 1994, and then once more in 1996. After their 1996 reunion, the band released three more studio albums, Zoom on June 14, 1998, Normal as the Next Guy on September 25, 2001, and Re-Zoom, a reissue of Zoom, in 2003. The band broke up once more in 2010, after lead singer, Doug Fieger, died on February 14. After his death, the band dropped their final studio album, Rock & Roll Is Good for You: The Fieger/Averre Demos, on September 11, 2012. None of the band's final four studio albums charted.

== Albums ==
=== Studio albums ===
Title	Album details	Peak chart positions										Certifications
Title	Album details	US	AUS	CAN	GER	IT	JPN	NL	NZ	SWE	UK	Certifications
Get the Knack	Released: June 1, 1979; Label: Capitol; Formats: LP, MC, 8-track	1	1	1	24	11	6	36	2	39	65	AUS: Gold; CAN: 4× Platinum; NZ: Gold; US: 2× Platinum
...But the Little Girls Understand	Released: February 15, 1980; Label: Capitol; Formats: LP, MC, 8-track	15	32	12	57	—	19	—	47	26	—	CAN: Platinum; US: Gold
Round Trip	Released: October 1981; Label: Capitol; Formats: LP, MC, 8-track	93	—	—	—	—	—	—	—	—	—	
Serious Fun	Released: January 15, 1991; Label: Charisma; Formats: CD, LP, MC	—	—	56	—	—	—	—	—	—	—	
Zoom	Released: July 14, 1998; Label: Rhino; Formats: CD, MC	—	—	—	—	—	—	—	—	—	—	
Normal as the Next Guy	Released: September 25, 2001; Label: Smile; Formats: CD	—	—	—	—	—	—	—	—	—	—	
Rock & Roll Is Good for You: The Fieger/Averre Demos	Released: September 11, 2012; Label: Omnivore; Formats: CD, LP, digital download	—	—	—	—	—	—	—	—	—	—	
"—" denotes releases that did not chart or were not released in that territory.

=== Live albums ===
Title	Album details
Live from the Rock n Roll Funhouse	Released: April 23, 2002; Label: Zen; Formats: CD
Havin' a Rave-Up! Live in Los Angeles, 1978	Released: May 22, 2012; Label: Zen/Omnivore; Formats: CD, digital download
Live at the House of Blues (September 25, 2001)	Released: April 23, 2022; Label: Liberation Hall/Smile; Formats: CD, 2xLP, digital download

=== Compilation albums ===
Title	Album details
My Sharona	Released: 1986; Label: Capitol; Formats: MC
Retrospective – The Best of the Knack	Released: 16 November 1992; Label: Capitol; Formats: CD, MC
My Sharona	Released: 1992; Label: EMI; Formats: CD, MC
Proof – The Very Best of the Knack	Released: 19 May 1998; Label: Rhino; Formats: CD
The Best of the Knack	Released: 17 August 1999; Label: EMI-Capitol; Formats: CD

=== Video albums ===
Title	Album details
The Knack Live at Carnegie Hall	Released: 1980; Label: Pioneer Artists; Formats: LaserDisc
Live from the Rock n Roll Funhouse	Released: April 23, 2002; Label: Zen; Formats: DVD
On Stage at World Cafe Live	Released: May 8, 2007; Label: Decca; Formats: DVD

== Singles ==
Title	Year	Peak chart positions										Certifications	Album
Title	Year	US	AUS	BE (FL)	CAN	GER	IT	NZ	SPA	SWI	UK	Certifications	Album
"My Sharona"	1979	1	1	12	1	12	2	3	7	7	6	CAN: Platinum; IT: Gold; UK: Gold; US: Gold	Get the Knack
"Good Girls Don't"	1979	11	—	—	1	—	—	20	—	—	66	CAN: Gold	Get the Knack
"Baby Talks Dirty"	1980	38	—	—	13	—	—	40	19	—	—		...But the Little Girls Understand
"I Want Ya" (Germany and Australia-only release)	1980	—	—	—	—	—	—	—	—	—	—		...But the Little Girls Understand
"Can't Put a Price on Love"	1980	62	—	—	—	—	—	—	—	—	—		...But the Little Girls Understand
"It's You" (UK and Spain-only release)	1980	—	—	—	—	—	—	—	—	—	—		...But the Little Girls Understand
"Mr. Handleman" (Netherlands-only release)	1980	—	—	—	—	—	—	—	—	—	—		...But the Little Girls Understand
"Africa" (Germany-only release)	1981	—	—	—	—	—	—	—	—	—	—		Round Trip
"Just Wait and See" (Japan-only release)	1981	—	—	—	—	—	—	—	—	—	—		Round Trip
"Pay the Devil (Ooo, Baby, Ooo)"	1981	67	—	—	—	—	—	—	—	—	—		Round Trip
"Boys Go Crazy"	1981	—	—	—	—	—	—	—	—	—	—		Round Trip
"Rocket O' Love"	1991	— (Note: "Rocket O' Love" did not enter the Billboard Hot 100, but it peaked at number 9 on the Billboard Mainstream Rock chart.)	—	—	30	—	—	—	—	—	—		Serious Fun
"My Sharona" (re-release)	1994	91	72	—	—	—	—	—	—	—	—		Reality Bites soundtrack
"Midnight Misogynist"	2012	—	—	—	—	—	—	—	—	—	—		Non-album single
"That's What the Little Girls Do"	2022	—	—	—	—	—	—	—	—	—	—		Live at the House of Blues
"Harder on You"	2022	—	—	—	—	—	—	—	—	—	—		Live at the House of Blues
"—" denotes releases that did not chart or were not released in that territory.
