= Your Number or Your Name =

Song by The Knack

from the album Get the Knack
- Released: June 11, 1979
- Recorded: April 1979
- Genre: Power pop
- Label: Capitol
- Songwriters: Doug Fieger, Berton Averre
- Producer: Mike Chapman

"Your Number or Your Name" is a song by American power pop band the Knack. It was released as the second track off of their debut studio album Get the Knack, released on the 11th of June, 1979. The song was written by Doug Fieger and Berton Averre, and was produced by Mike Chapman.

The song has also appeared on a number of live and compilation albums, including 1980's The Knack Live at Carnegie Hall, 1992's Retrospective – The Best of the Knack, 1998's Proof – The Very Best of the Knack, 1999's The Best of the Knack and 2012's Havin' a Rave-Up! Live in Los Angeles, 1978.

== Lyrics and music ==
According to co-writer Averre "Your Number or Your Name" was intended to sound like a Hollies song. However, he feels that Bruce Gary's drumming transformed it into the type of song where the band was "jumping and slamming and thrusting." Modern Drummer wrote that "the barrage of gonzo fills" Gary provides on the song confirm Gary's description of the Knack as "a very good, sensible pop band with a very bombastic drummer". Modern Drummer compared Gary's performance on the song to the Who's Keith Moon. Ultimate Classic Rock critic Dave Swanson confirmed that even with Gary's performance on drums the song still evokes the Hollies' sound that was intended. The lyrics describe a woman who the singer often sees but can never contact. Los Angeles Times critic Robert Hilburn has commented about the teenage innocence of the lyrics.

== Reception ==
Billboard Magazine praised "Your Number or Your Name" for its distinctive melody and for its lyrics, as well as the drumming, guitar playing and vocal harmonies. Music journalist John M. Borack described "Your Number or Your Name" as a "ridiculously catchy gem." He also described it as "excellent," ranking it No. 22 on his list of definitive power pop songs. Something Else! critic JC Mosquito rated "Your Number or Your Name" as one of five power pop songs greater than the Raspberries classic "Go All the Way". Mosquito praised its restraint compared with the Knack's more famous songs. Musichound reviewer John Nieman described the song as a "standout" ballad. Swanson described the song as "pure pop gold". Rock Beat International editor Beverly Paterson described it as a "charmingly chiming" song. PopMatters critic Ryan Taylor reviewing the live version on The Knack: Havin' a Rave-Up! Live in Los Angeles, 1978 described the song as "a Who-like stunner." Antonio Méndez ranked this as a great song on which the Knack demonstrates its talent for composition. Musician Robbie Rist regards it as part of the "lethal opening salvo" of Get the Knack. Knack bassist Prescott Niles particularly liked the song's melody and its guitar hooks.

== Other releases ==
"Your Number or Your Name" was often played at the Knack's live shows and was included in several of the band's live albums. It was included on the 2012 live album Havin' a Rave-Up! Live in Los Angeles, 1978, which was based on two concerts the band performed in Los Angeles in 1978, before signing their record deal with Capitol Records. The Knack also performed it at the 1979 concert at Carnegie Hall and it was included on the video disc The Knack Live at Carnegie Hall.

"Your Number or Your Name" was also included on several of the Knack's compilation albums, and AllMusic critic Greg Prato called it one of the "expected tracks" on such albums along with the Top 40 singles "My Sharona," "Good Girls Don't" and "Baby Talks Dirty." Compilation albums on which "Your Number or Your Name" appears include The Retrospective: The Best of the Knack (released on the 16th of November, 1992), Proof – The Very Best of the Knack (released on the 19th of May, 1998) and Best of the Knack (released on the 17th of August, 1999).
