= (She's So) Selfish =

Song by The Knack

from the album Get the Knack
- Released: June 11, 1979
- Recorded: April 1979
- Genre: New wave, hard rock, power pop
- Length: 4:30
- Label: Capitol
- Songwriters: Doug Fieger, Berton Averre
- Producer: Mike Chapman

"(She's So) Selfish" is a song by American power pop band The Knack, from their debut studio album, Get the Knack, released on the 11th of June, 1979. The song was written by Doug Fieger and Berton Averre, and was inspired by the same woman who inspired the band's #1 single "My Sharona. It was intended for release as a single, but the singles release was prevented by its "scatological" lyrics. It was praised by critics for its hooks and style, but criticized for its nastiness and sexism.

The song has also appeared on a number of live and compilation albums, including 1980's The Knack Live at Carnegie Hall, 1992's Retrospective – The Best of the Knack and My Sharona, 2002's Live from the Rock n Roll Funhouse, 2007's On Stage at World Cafe Live, and 2012's Havin' a Rave-Up! Live in Los Angeles, 1978.

== Lyrics and music ==
The music of "(She's So) Selfish" is based on a Bo Diddley-like riff. According to Averre, Fieger wrote most of "(She's So) Selfish" and Averre wrote the "release" section with its "dirty words":

When she takes you by the short hairs
It's the only thing she'll leave you down there
No fuck-a me fuck-a me today
No fuck-a me fuck-a me today

The song was inspired by Fieger's as-yet-unrequited passion for Sharona Alperin, girlfriend of Doug Fieger, who also inspired other Knack songs such as "My Sharona," and Averre has called it a "teasing, playful look" at her. Alperin concurs that she was the inspiration. According to Ed Stephens, Jr. of Saipan Tribune, the song is about a "manipulative tease." Taking a line from the song, Ira Robbins and Michael Sandlin of Trouser Press describe the girl in the song as "rich bitch." Ultimate Classic Rock writer Dave Swanson included it as one of the Knack's "top shelf, hook-laden rockers" but acknowledged that it is "full of words that wouldn't fly past radio censors." Critic Robert Hilburn of the Los Angeles Times describes that the Knack uses crude, locker room language to portray a teenager's view of frustration. Robert Wilonsky of the Dallas Observer described it as a "teen-beat [anthem] about doin' it to your girlfriend while Mom and Dad were out of the house"

== Reception ==
The Associated Press, TV Guide and others identified "(She's So) Selfish" as one of the Knack's radio hits. Classic Rock History critic Skip Anderson rated it as the Knack's 7th best song and noted the "Bo Diddley hambone style beat." Terry Atkinson of the Los Angeles Times calls it "one of the Knack's better songs." Mike Daily of The Age claims that it deserves equal credit with "My Sharona" for the success of Get the Knack. Audio magazine called it a "basher" with "plenty of style". Tina Maples of the Milwaukee Journal Sentinel praised its "hooky effervescence". Charla Wasel of The Evening Independent described it as a song "with which we can all relate." Billboard says that it is "delivered in a smart, sophisticated post-punk style that oozes Southern Californian snootiness." It also uses the song as an example of the Knack being "mad about the way things are" with lyrics that "are as innocent as the chief of police in a Latin American dictatorship," citing such lines as "she got a smile in her ass" and "she says she'll make your motor run but she won't give you none" as setting the tone. Author John Borack described "(She's So) Selfish" as a "mean pop tune" in which Fieger comes off "like a leering, sexist twit with hormones a-raging." J. J. Syrja of The Seguin Gazette said that with this song the Knack "[struck] pure teenage delirium." Paul Wagner of Santa Cruz Sentinel claimed that "it had the same sparkle" as "My Sharona."

Cue New York criticized the "sexist get-a-girl lyrics." Jim Sullivan of The Boston Globe calls it "a tiresome, sexist rant." The 3rd edition of The Rolling Stone Album Guide, music critic Robert Christgau and other critics commented on the song's nastiness, with authors Michael Uslan and Bruce Solomon calling it "by far the nastiest and most up-front cut on the album." Eric Siegel of The Sun claims that lines such as "It's just me me me me/She's so (dramatic pause) selfish" make apparent the group's "lack of lyrical ability," comparing the lyrics unfavorably to Carly Simon's similarly themed "You're So Vain."

Producer Mike Chapman considers "(She's So) Selfish" his favorite song from Get the Knack besides "My Sharona". Actor/musician Robbie Rist considers it part of the "lethal opening salvo" that opens Get the Knack, which Rist feels few if any albums can match.

== Censored version ==
Capitol Records wanted to release "(She's So) Selfish" as a follow-up single from Get the Knack to "My Sharona" and "Good Girls Don't" in time for Christmas 1979. However, they could not do so unless some of the more "scatological" references were edited out. The band, having already edited out some lyrics for the single release of "Good Girls Don't," refused to do it again, preventing the single release. According to Knack bassist Prescott Niles, Fieger felt that altering the lyrics to "(She's So) Selfish" would be "selling out." Averre didn't see anything problematic about including the profane lyrics, since that is how teenagers spoke and they heard such language all the time.

Despite the band's concerns, an edited version of the song was released in Canada, removing lines such as "fuck-a me today" and "she don't give a shit about anybody else but herself." This version was accidentally included on the initial CD release of Get the Knack in the USA, despite the fact that according to Fieger the tape with the altered lyrics was in a box with big red letters stating "NOT MASTER! NOT TO BE USED! ONLY CANADIAN RADIO!."

== Other releases ==
"(She's So) Selfish" was a staple of the Knack's live shows and was included in several of the band's live albums, generally towards the end of the set right before "My Sharona." It was included on the live album Havin' a Rave-Up! Live in Los Angeles, 1978 (released on the 22nd of May, 2012), which was based on two concerts the band performed in Los Angeles, California in 1978, before signing their record deal that would lead to Get the Knack. The Knack performed it at the 1979 concert at Carnegie Hall which was used for the 1980 video disc The Knack Live at Carnegie Hall. It was later included on the CD of Live From the Rock 'N' Roll Funhouse (released on the 23rd of April, 2002) and on the DVD On Stage at World Cafe Live (released on the 8th of May, 2008).

"(She's So) Selfish" appeared on the Knack's 1992 compilation albums The Retrospective: The Best of the Knack and My Sharona (the former releasing on the 16th of November of that year). Ben Folds covered the song on his 2007 album Get Nack.
