= Pay the Devil (Ooo, Baby, Ooo) =

1981 single by The Knack

Single by The Knack

from the album Round Trip
- B-side: "Lil' Cals Big Mistake"
- Released: 1981
- Genre: Power pop
- Length: 3:52
- Label: Capitol
- Songwriter: Berton Averre
- Producer: Jack Douglas

The Knack singles chronology
| "Can't Put a Price on Love" (1980) | "Pay the Devil (Ooo, Baby, Ooo)" (1981) | "Rocket O' Love" (1991) |

"Pay the Devil (Ooo, Baby, Ooo)" is a song written by Berton Averre and first released by the Knack on their 1981 album Round Trip. It was also released as a single, and reached #67 on the Billboard Hot 100. It continued the descending patterns of the Knack's singles from "My Sharona" which reached #1 to "Good Girls Don't" which reached #11 to "Baby Talks Dirty" which peaked at #38 to "Can't Put a Price on Love" which only reached #62. However, it was the last Knack single to chart at all until "My Sharona" re-entered the charts at #91 in 1994 in the wake of its appearance in the soundtrack of Reality Bites. "Pay the Devil" was later included on Knack compilation albums The Retrospective: The Best of the Knack and Very Best of the Knack.

== Lyrics & music ==
Although lead singer Doug Fieger wrote or co-wrote most of the Knack's songs, lead guitarist Berton Averre received the sole writing credit for "Pay the Devil." Fieger claimed that it was "a very personal song" of Averre's. Fieger interpreted the song as "whatever you may want, there's always a price to pay." Rolling Stone critic David Fricke interprets the song as possibly containing an apology for some of the band's earlier mistakes in lines such as:

Everybody's got to read the reviews
... even you
Got to learn to give the devil his due

Fricke describes the music of "Pay the Devil" as country music waltz although other critics, such as Allmusic's Steve Schnee describe the song as a ballad.

== Single release ==
Round Trip contained an eclectic collection of songs, and it was not obvious which song should be the lead single. The band's choice for a lead single was "Soul Kissin'." However, to the band's surprise, an A&R man at their label, Capitol Records, felt that "Pay the Devil" could become a hit single, and so "Pay the Devil" was released instead. Although producer Jack Douglas felt "Pay the Devil" was "a really good song," he didn't think "Pay the Devil" was an appropriate song for the lead single because it did not give a representative taste of the album. Averre claims that the band was not surprised that the song "failed to click as a single."

== Critical reception ==
Allmusic critic Steve Schnee praised "Pay the Devil" as a "beautifully haunting ballad" and included it as one of "the Knack's best tracks." Billboard described the song as "the kind of tune that gets better with every listen." Record World said that it "spotlights Doug Fieger's expert lead vocals and the band's harmonies." Record World also said that "The candy-coated hook is delivered with Doug Fieger's loving care, and aimed at pop radio." Ira Robbins and Michael Sandlin of Trouser Press called "Pay the Devil" "mushy, pandering lounge-rock." Rolling Stone's David Fricke described the song as "slick, sub-Eagles fluff." Keith Tuber of Orange Coast Magazine called "Pay the Devil" "a tasty melodic ballad," although he preferred the band's choice for a single, "Soul Kissin'." Classic Rock History critic Skip Anderson felt that its gospel music music influences turned many listeners off and that "Boys Go Crazy" would have been a more suitable lead single from the album.

== "Lil' Cals Big Mistake" ==
"Lil' Cals Big Mistake"

Song by The Knack

from the album Round Trip
- Released: 1981
- Length: 3:45
- Label: Capitol Records; EMI
- Songwriters: Berton Averre and Doug Fieger
- Producer: Jack Douglas

"Lil' Cals Big Mistake" is the 8th track off of The Knack's third studio album, Round Trip. The song was originally released as the B-side to the album's first single, "Pay the Devil (Ooo, Baby, Ooo)" in 1981, and would later be released on Round Trip in October of that same year, where it would be the second song of the second side of the album, called "Back". The song is 3 minutes and 45 seconds long, and was one of 7 songs to be written by Berton Averre and Doug Fieger.
