= Chipmunk Punk =

Studio album by The Chipmunks
- Released: June 1980
- Recorded: September 1979–April 1980
- Genres: Rock, new wave, novelty
- Length: 29:27
- Labels: Mercury (UK); Excelsior (US)
- Producer: Steve Vining

The Chipmunks chronology
The Chipmunks Go to the Movies (1969)	Chipmunk Punk (1980)	Urban Chipmunk (1981)

Singles from Chipmunk Punk
- 1. "Call Me"/"Refugee" Released: 1980

Chipmunk Punk is an album by the Chipmunks, as well as being the first album released by Ross Bagdasarian Jr., after he took over the voices of the Chipmunks after the death of his father in 1972. Despite the title of the album, none of the songs listed are considered to be in the style of real punk rock music. It was released in June 1980 (see 1980 in music). The album peaked at No. 34 on the Billboard 200. It was certified gold by the RIAA on October 14, 1980, becoming the Chipmunks' first gold record. In 2005, it was re-released on CD, although the CD was only available through the official Chipmunks website. In Canada, the album reached No. 59.

== History ==
The inspiration for the album came when KMET DJ Chuck Taylor played the 12″ version of the Blondie song "Call Me" at 45 instead of 33 1/3 RPM and announced, in jest, that it was the Chipmunks' latest single. So many requests came for this new Chipmunks release that Ross Bagdasarian Jr. and his collaborator Steve Vining rushed to record this album.

In addition to "Call Me", the album features covers of songs by The Knack ("My Sharona," "Good Girls Don't," "Frustrated"), The Cars ("Let's Go"), Tom Petty and the Heartbreakers ("Refugee"), Billy Joel ("You May Be Right"), Queen ("Crazy Little Thing Called Love"), and Linda Ronstadt ("How Do I Make You").

Chipmunk Punk marked the rebirth of the Chipmunk franchise. It was the first new Chipmunk release since 1969's The Chipmunks Go to the Movies. Previous Chipmunk activity ceased in 1972 with the death of franchise creator/producer Ross Bagdasarian Sr. (also known as David Seville) from a heart attack.

Though this release followed a long dormancy record-wise, the characters had returned to public view via Saturday morning repeats of the cartoon series The Alvin Show on NBC in 1979. The album sparked a second run of the characters and led to another Saturday morning cartoon series, Alvin and the Chipmunks, which began in 1983 and also aired on NBC.

== Critical reception ==
Professional ratings
Review scores
Source	Rating
Allmusic	3/5 stars

The album met mixed critical reviews. Peter Goddard of the Toronto Star gave the album two stars, writing, "if you want to go out and buy this ridiculous album, go ahead. But remember this: if you do, you'll just encourage Frankie Avalon to come out of retirement." Bill Provich of the Ottawa Citizen commented that while any of the individual songs could have made an amusing novelty single, over the course of a full album the joke quickly wears thin. Wayne Robins of Newsday similarly remarked that if heard once on the car radio, the Chipmunks joke is funny, but it wears out its welcome over multiple listens at home. Gus Walker of The Arizona Republic described Chipmunk Punk as grating and a chore to listen to.

Marc Zakem's review for The Courier-Journal, was facetiously written under the conceit that the Chipmunks are real musicians and included an extensive rundown of what the members had been doing in the years that the band was inactive. He noted that despite the title, Chipmunk Punk consists not of punk rock but of pop rock and new wave music which was inspired by the punk movement. He praised the song selection as all being works well-suited to the Chipmunks, and said they were executed well, though he judged it inferior to some of their older albums.

The album received mixed-to-negative reviews in the United Kingdom. Smash Hits advised that the album does not actually have much to do with punk, and lacks the freshness and enthusiasm of the Chipmunks records from the 1950s and 1960s. While a critic for the Somerset Standard called it "a fun record", James Belsey of the Bristol Post called it "humourless" and "silly".

In a retrospective review, Doug Stone of Allmusic called it "good clean fun" which "if nothing else...provides a portrait of a prime period in radio."

In 2015, Canadian musician Brian Borcherdt posted recordings of the album on SoundCloud which slowed down the recordings to 16 revolutions per minute, and titled the project "Chipmunks on 16 Speed". Chris Dart of The A.V. Club described the resulting recordings as sounding like sludge metal.

== Track listing ==
=== Vinyl/cassette ===
Track listing per AllMusic.

==== Side one ====
1. "Let's Go" (Ric Ocasek) – 3:35
2. "Good Girls Don't" (Doug Fieger) – 3:13
3. "How Do I Make You" (Billy Steinberg) – 2:23
4. "Refugee" (Tom Petty, Mike Campbell) – 3:07
5. "Frustrated" (Berton Averre, Doug Fieger) – 2:54
  - contains an unlisted excerpt from "(I Can't Get No) Satisfaction" (Mick Jagger, Keith Richards).

==== Side two ====
1. "Call Me" (Debbie Harry, Giorgio Moroder) – 3:11
2. "You May Be Right" (Billy Joel) – 4:03
3. "Crazy Little Thing Called Love" (Freddie Mercury) – 2:39
4. "My Sharona" (Berton Averre, Doug Fieger) – 4:03

=== CD ===
1. "Call Me" (Debbie Harry, Giorgio Moroder) – 3:11
2. "Refugee" (Tom Petty, Mike Campbell) – 3:07
3. "Frustrated" (Berton Averre, Doug Fieger) – 2:54
4. "You May Be Right" (Billy Joel) – 4:03
5. "Crazy Little Thing Called Love" (Freddie Mercury) – 2:47
6. "My Sharona" (Berton Averre, Doug Fieger) – 4:03
7. "How Do I Make You...?" (Billy Steinberg) – 2:23
8. "Good Girls Don't" (Doug Fieger) – 3:13
9. "Let's Go" (Ric Ocasek) – 3:35

== Personnel ==
=== Musicians ===
The original release credits only the fictional characters as performers, with Alvin on lead guitar and vocals, Simon on bass and vocals, and Theodore on drums and vocals.

- Ross Bagdasarian, Jr.: vocals as Alvin and Simon
- Steve Vining: vocals as Theodore
- Danny Kortchmar: lead guitar
- Tommy Organ: rhythm guitar
- Leland Sklar: bass
- Russ Kunkel: drums
- Clarence McDonald: keyboards

=== Production ===
- Steve Vining: producer
- Bob McNabb: engineer
- Ross Bagdasarian, Jr.: production consultant
- Doug Oudekerk: cover art

==== 2005 CD edition ====
- Janice Karman: reissue producer
- Spencer Chrislu: digital remastering
