= Normal as the Next Guy =

Studio album by the Knack
- Released: September 25th, 2001
- Genre: Pop, power pop
- Label: Smile Records
- Producer: Richard Bosworth

The Knack chronology
Zoom (1998)	Normal as the Next Guy (2001)	Re-Zoom (2003)

Singles from Normal as the Next Guy
- 1. "Les Girls" Released: 2001; 2. "Normal as the Next Guy" Released: 2002; 3. "The Man on the Beach" Released: 2024

Professional ratings
Review scores
Source	Rating
Allmusic	3/5 stars

Normal as the Next Guy is the sixth studio album by American rock band the Knack, released on September 25, 2001. It marks the fourth comeback attempt by the band after its second album, ...But the Little Girls Understand, failed to achieve the success of the band's début album. AllMusic critic Mark Deming noted that the album finds songwriter and lead singer Doug Fieger having resolved his issues with women, but has not "found a subject that appears to compel him nearly as much as the treacheries of girls once did." Therefore, Deming feels that compared to older songs by the band, the songs on Normal as the Next Guy "may be more pleasant, but they're not as interesting." The Rolling Stone Album Guide gave the album a 3 star rating, as high as the group's début Get The Knack, and higher than any other Knack studio album.

Normal as the Next Guy was the Knack's first release on Smile Records. Pat Torpey and David Henderson play drums on Normal as the Next Guy, instead of original Knack drummer Bruce Gary. Fieger has described the album as "us doing whatever we want."

== Track listing ==
1. "Les Girls" (Doug Fieger) - 3:21
2. "Disillusion Town" (Berton Averre, Doug Fieger) - 4:14
3. "Girl I Never Lied to You" (Monty Byrom, John Corey) - 3:35
4. "Normal as the Next Guy" (Berton Averre, Doug Fieger) - 3:21
5. "Spiritual Pursuit" (Doug Fieger) - 2:17
6. "It's Not Me" (John Bossman, Doug Fieger) - 2:57
7. "One Day at a Time" (Berton Averre, Doug Fieger) - 4:46
8. "Seven Days of Heaven" (Doug Fieger, Hannah Mancini, Sergej Pobegaijlo) - 4:45
9. "Dance of Romance" (Berton Averre, Doug Fieger) - 3:35
10. "Reason to Live" (John Bossman, Doug Fieger) - 4:20
11. "A World of My Own" (John Bossman, Doug Fieger) - 4:15
12. "The Man on the Beach" (Berton Averre) - 4:14

== Personnel ==
- Doug Fieger — lead and backing vocals, electric and acoustic guitars, bass, Mellotron, Vox organ, percussion
- Berton Averre — lead guitar, backing vocals, piano, Wurlitzer electric piano, Hammond organ, Mellotron, synth horns
- Prescott Niles — bass, six-string bass
- David Henderson — drums
- Pat Torpey — drums
- John Amato — saxophone (track 1)
- Art Fein — accordion (track 1)
- John Jorgenson — guitar solo (track 11)
- Justin Rocherolle — percussion (track 12)
