= The Chipmunks Go to the Movies =

Studio album by Alvin and the Chipmunks and David Seville
- Released: 1969
- Recorded: 1969
- Genre: Pop, children's
- Length: 24:46
- Label: Sunset Records/Liberty Records
- Producer: Ross Bagdasarian

Alvin and the Chipmunks and David Seville chronology
The Chipmunks See Doctor Dolittle (1968)	The Chipmunks Go to the Movies (1969)	Chipmunk Punk (1980)

Singles from The Chipmunks Go to the Movies
- 1. "Chitty Chitty Bang Bang" Released: 1969

The Chipmunks Go to the Movies is a 1969 music album by David Seville and Alvin and the Chipmunks, released by Sunset Records, the budget-line subsidiary of Liberty Records. As its title suggests, it consists of covers of songs from films.

This was the final Chipmunks studio album credited to "Alvin, Simon & Theodore with David Seville", and the last to be released before the death of Ross Bagdasarian in 1972. It was also the last new Chipmunks album until 1980, when Chipmunk Punk was released by Bagdasarian's son, Ross Bagdasarian Jr.

The Chipmunks Go to the Movies was released on cassette in 1987 and compact disc in 2008 by Capitol Records.

The title The Chipmunks Go to the Movies was later used for the final season of the TV series Alvin and the Chipmunks, which first aired in 1990. Each episode of the season parodied a popular film of the time.

== Track listing ==
All songs written by Richard M. Sherman and Robert B. Sherman except where noted.

Side one
No.	Title	Writer(s)	Featured film	Length
1.	"Chitty Chitty Bang Bang"		Chitty Chitty Bang Bang (1968)	2:42
2.	"Hushabye Mountain"		Chitty Chitty Bang Bang	2:10
3.	"Supercalifragilisticexpialidocious"		Mary Poppins (1964)	2:08
4.	"We're Off to See the Wizard"	Harold Arlen, Yip Harburg	The Wizard of Oz (1939)	2:32
5.	"The Bare Necessities"	Terry Gilkyson	The Jungle Book (1967)	2:34

Side two
No.	Title	Writer(s)	Featured film	Length
6.	"Chim Chim Cher-ee"		Mary Poppins	2:20
7.	"Que Sera, Sera (Whatever Will Be, Will Be)"	Jay Livingston, Ray Evans	The Man Who Knew Too Much (1956)	1:50
8.	"Consider Yourself"	Lionel Bart	Oliver! (1968)	3:02
9.	"You Two"		Chitty Chitty Bang Bang	2:39
10.	"The Roses of Success"		Chitty Chitty Bang Bang	2:53
Total length:				24:46

Tracks 3 and 7 were originally released on The Chipmunks Sing with Children (1965)

Cassette tape release
No.	Title	Writer(s)	Featured film	Length
1.	"We're off to See the Wizard"	Harold Arlen, Yip Harburg	The Wizard of Oz
2.	"Supercalifragilisticexpialidocious"		Mary Poppins
3.	"Que Sera, Sera (Whatever Will Be, Will Be)"	Jay Livingston, Ray Evans	The Man Who Knew Too Much
4.	"Whistle While You Work"	Frank Churchill, Larry Morey	Snow White and the Seven Dwarfs (1937)
5.	"Chitty Chitty Bang Bang"		Chitty Chitty Bang Bang
6.	"What's New Pussycat?"	Burt Bacharach, Hal David	What's New Pussycat? (1965)
7.	"Hello, Dolly!"	Jerry Herman	Hello, Dolly! 1964
8.	"Talk to the Animals"	Leslie Bricusse	Doctor Dolittle (1967)
9.	"A Hard Day's Night"	Lennon–McCartney	A Hard Day's Night (1964)

Track 4 was originally released on Let's All Sing with The Chipmunks, Track 6 Chipmunks à Go-Go, Track 7 The Chipmunks Sing with Children, Track 8 The Chipmunks See Doctor Dolittle, and Track 9 The Chipmunks Sing the Beatles Hits.
