= Rock & Roll Is Good for You: The Fieger/Averre Demos =

Studio album by The Knack
- Released: September 11, 2012
- Recorded: 1973, 1975
- Genre: Power pop
- Length: 47:15
- Label: Omnivore Recordings
- Producers: Lee Lodyga, Cheryl Pawelski

The Knack chronology
Re-Zoom (2003)	Rock & Roll Is Good for You: The Fieger/Averre Demos (2012)

Rock & Roll Is Good for You: The Fieger/Averre Demos is the seventh and final studio album by The Knack which was released on September 11, 2012. It includes demo recordings made by Doug Fieger and Berton Averre made between 1973 and 1975. Most of the songs are performed by just Fieger and Averre, both singing and playing guitar, but some songs include the full band. Two of the songs, "Good Girls Don't" and "That's What the Little Girls Do," were released in more polished form on the Knack's debut album, Get the Knack. Other songs whose demos appear on Rock & Roll Is Good for You later provided elements for other Knack songs. For example, "Corporation Shuffle (Daddy Turns the Volume Down)," described by Allmusic critic Stephen Thomas Erlewine as "a nifty bit of fuzzy, snarky rock & roll in the vein of the Move," provided the basis for "Terry & Julie Step Out," a song from the 1998 album Zoom.

== Critical reception ==
Professional ratings
Review scores
Source	Rating
Allmusic	3.5/5 stars

Allmusic critic Stephen Thomas Erlewine praises the "pop craftsmanship" shown by Fieger and Averre on the album. He also notes that "the best moments are the noisiest" but that the quieter moments are fine too. He also states that the songs on the album demonstrate that the Knack had the ability to be "more than a one-hit wonder."

== Track listing ==
All tracks are written by Doug Fieger, except where noted

1. "Have a Heart" - 2:14
2. "Corporation Shuffle (Daddy Turns the Volume Down)" (Fieger, Berton Averre) - 3:11
3. "Good Girls Don't" - 3:14
4. "Little Lies" (Fieger, Averre) - 2:26
5. "Flower My Fate" - 3:54
6. "Weiss On Rye (Hold the Mavo)" - 3:21
7. "You'll Never Know" - 2:33
8. "That's What the Little Girls Do" - 2:48
9. "Get On the Plane" - 2:14
10. "(Here On This) Lonely Night" - 2:33
11. "Lazer Days" - 4:12
12. "The Other Side (Of the Line)" - 3:22
13. "Who'll Set You Down" - 2:45
14. "Mama I Feel Your Sadness" - 2:39
15. "What Ya Gonna Do Now?" - 2:18
16. "Rock & Roll Is Good for You" - 3:31

Notes

Tracks 1–6, 11–12 recorded 1975, tracks 7–10, 13–16 recorded 1973.

== Personnel ==
- Lee Lodyga – compilation producer, liner notes
- Cheryl Pawelski – compilation producer
- Gavin Lurssen – mastering
- Reuben Cohen – mastering
- Greg Allen – art direction, design
