= Round Trip (The Knack album) =

Studio album by the Knack
- Released: October 1981
- Genres: Power pop, new wave
- Labels: Capitol; EMI
- Producer: Jack Douglas

The Knack chronology
...But the Little Girls Understand (1980)	Round Trip (1981)	Serious Fun (1991)

Singles from Round Trip
- 1. "Pay The Devil (Ooo, Baby, Ooo)" Released: 1981; 2. "Just Wait and See" Released: 1981 (single in Japan); 3. "Boys Go Crazy" Released: 1981; 4. "Art War" Released: 1981; 5. "Africa" Released: 1981

Professional ratings
Review scores
Source	Rating
AllMusic	3.5/5 stars
Rolling Stone	3/5 stars

Round Trip is the third studio album by power pop/new wave band the Knack, released by Capitol Records in 1981. It received generally unfavorable critical reviews, and peaked at No. 93 in the Billboard 200. It contained the single "Pay the Devil (Ooo, Baby, Ooo)" (which hit No. 67 on the Billboard Hot 100). "Boys Go Crazy" was issued as the single from the album in Australia. It was also issued as a follow-up single to "Pay the Devil" in the U.S. and was expected to be "chart bound" on the Hot 100, but it did not chart. The band broke up a few months after its release, with their label dropping them due to failed expectations. They remained disbanded until a 1986 reunion.

== Overview and reviews ==
Round Trip was their third album, and it was produced by Jack Douglas. The album was generally critically panned at the time of its release, however, some critics have subsequently been more positive. Steve "Spaz" Schnee of Allmusic called it "brilliant" and stated that it was better than the previous two albums. Darren Robbins of the pop culture review website The Zeitgeisty Report has called the album a "masterpiece" and "possibly the most underrated album of all-time".

Critic David Fricke of Rolling Stone gave a generally positive review, commenting:

Like Icarus in a skinny tie, the Knack flew too close to the sun and got burned real bad. Now they'd have us believe that they want to make amends. If the message of the first album was Get the Knack (or get lost) and the second LP insisted that the critics don't know...but the little girls understand, then the gist of Round Trip is, "We're sorry, give us another chance"... Given another chance with Round Trip, however, the Knack acquit themselves better than we had any reason to expect. If this were their first record, it'd be an impressive, entertaining debut. As their third, it's a somewhat remarkable comeback from beyond the grave of superhype.

The New York Times was less generous. The Times, while calling the album "well-crafted" said that "with its careful harmonies, psychedelic sound effects and jazzy touches, [the album] tries to conceal the utter fatuity of its songs under studio cosmetics," and took the album as proof that The Knack was a "one-hit wonder."

"Boys Go Crazy" was included in the 1992 EMI Music compilation album My Sharona. The songs "Another Lousy Day in Paradise," "Africa," "Sweet Dreams," "Just Wait and See," "Pay the Devil (Ooo, Baby, Ooo)" and "We Are Waiting" were incorporated into The Retrospective: The Best of the Knack, which was released by Capitol Records on November 16, 1992. Songs "Another Lousy Day in Paradise," "Just Wait and See" and "Pay the Devil (Ooo, Baby, Ooo)" were included in Very Best of the Knack, released by Rhino Records on May 19, 1998. "Boys Go Crazy" and "Pay the Devil (Ooo, Baby, Ooo)" were included in Best of the Knack, released by Collectables Records on August 17, 1999. A live version of "Art War" was included on Havin’ a Rave-Up! Live In Los Angeles, 1978, a live album from the Knack's 1978 concerts in Los Angeles prior to the release of "Get the Knack."

Classic Rock History critic Skip Anderson rated "Boys Go Crazy" as the Knack's 8th best song and felt it should have been the lead single in the U.S. rather than "Pay the Devil". Record World called it "a straight-ahead rocker" in which "Doug Fieger's emphatic vocal rides a racehorse rhythm."

== Track listing ==
Instead of the conventional "side 1" and "side 2", the sides of the original vinyl issue were labeled as "there" and "back".

All songs are by Berton Averre and Doug Fieger unless noted

=== There ===
1. "Radiating Love" 4:42
2. "Soul Kissin'" 3:40
3. "Africa" 4:34
4. "She Likes the Beat" (Doug Fieger) 3:04
5. "Just Wait and See" 3:04
6. "We Are Waiting" (Doug Fieger, John Corey) 4:25

=== Back ===
1. "Boys Go Crazy" (Doug Fieger) 2:48
2. "Lil' Cals Big Mistake" 3:45
3. "Sweet Dreams" (Doug Fieger) 3:37
4. "Another Lousy Day in Paradise" 3:34
5. "Pay the Devil (Ooo, Baby, Ooo)" (Berton Averre) 4:13
6. "Art War" 4:13

== Personnel ==
The Knack

- Doug Fieger – lead vocals, rhythm guitar
- Berton Averre – lead guitar, keyboards, vocals
- Prescott Niles – bass guitar
- Bruce Gary – drums and percussion

Additional personnel

- Flo & Eddie - Backing Vocals, Track 1 Radiating Love
- Mark Volman - Backing Vocals Track 11 Pay The Devil
- Jack Douglas – producer
- Lee De Carlo – engineer
- Malcolm Pollack – assistant engineer, mixing (mixed in Studio C at Power Station)

== See also ==
- 1981 in music
