= Can't Put a Price on Love =

1980 single by The Knack

Single by The Knack

from the album ...But the Little Girls Understand
- B-side: "(Havin' a) Rave Up"
- Released: March 1980
- Recorded: December 1979
- Studio: MCA-Whitney Studios, Glendale, California
- Genre: Rock, new wave, power pop
- Length: 4:43 (album version); 3:35 (7" version)
- Label: Capitol
- Songwriter(s): Doug Fieger, Berton Averre
- Producer(s): Mike Chapman

The Knack singles chronology
"Baby Talks Dirty" (1980)	"Can't Put a Price on Love" (1980)	"Pay the Devil (Ooo, Baby, Ooo)" (1981)

"Can't Put a Price on Love" is a 1980 song written by Doug Fieger and Berton Averre. It was originally released by American pop group The Knack on their second album, ...But the Little Girls Understand. It was the second song from that album that was released as a single, reaching #62 on the Billboard Hot 100, falling short of the performance by its preceding single, "Baby Talks Dirty", which reached #30 in Cash Box and #38 in Billboard. Overall, it was the fourth single which The Knack had released, and was the first such release which did not reach the Top 40.

== Lyrics and music ==
In his scathing review of ...But the Little Girls Understand, Rolling Stone critic Dave Marsh wrote "All of Fieger's lyrics finally boil down to one sentiment: f*** me, honey. (When he's feeling ambitious, he writes something like 'Can't Put a Price on Love,' which translates: f*** me for free, babe.)" The Sydney Morning Herald was kinder, noting that the song provided a slower contrast to the faster songs on ...But the Little Girls Understand, and that there was "a kick in the lyrics," i.e.:

You smoked me like a cigarette
I was burning, I was cast aside
Now you knew what you couldn't get
So you settled for my pride.

Billboard found it to be an improvement over the Knack's previous single "Baby Talks Dirty," describing it as a "midtempo,'60's flavored pop tune" and stating that "Fieger shows honest emotion in his vocals." Cash Box called it "an unpretentious, honest love ballad." Cash Box also said that "trembly guitar and echoed snare shots give a raw edge." Calling the song a "power ballad", Record World said that "the Knack shows a more subtle side that profits from Mike Chapman's glossy production." Classic Rock History critic Skip Anderson rated it as the Knack's 10th best song and noted a resemblance to John Cafferty and the Beaver Brown Band.

Cash Box and other critics commented on the similarity between "Can't Put a Price on Love" and the 1978 Rolling Stones' song "Beast of Burden". Jim Sullivan of the Bangor Daily News claimed that "the guitar line from 'Can't Put a Price on Love' is nicked directly from the Stones' 'Beast of Burden.'" However, in an interview, Fieger denied that the song is an homage to "Beast of Burden," stating "The reality to that is that it was a homage to any number of Steve Cropper songs which 'Beast of Burden' was a homage to." Fieger has acknowledged that, like many songs on The Knack's first two albums, "Can't Put a Price on Love" was written about the same Sharona Alperin who inspired "My Sharona".

== Other appearances ==
"Can't Put a Price on Love" was first released in February 1980 on the album ..But the Little Girls Understand, and then as a single in April 1980, as a follow-up to "Baby Talks Dirty." Subsequently, "Can't Put a Price on Love" was released on several Knack compilation albums, including The Retrospective: The Best of The Knack (1992), Very Best of The Knack (1998) and Best of The Knack (1999). The version which was released on Very Best of The Knack was the single edit rather than the original album version.

== "(Havin' a) Rave Up" ==
"(Havin' a) Rave Up"

Song by The Knack

from the album ...But the Little Girls Understand
- Released: February 15, 1980
- Length: 1:48
- Label: Capitol Records
- Songwriter(s): Berton Averre, Doug Fieger
- Producer(s): Mike Chapman

The B-side of the "Can't Put a Price on Love" single was "(Havin' a) Rave Up," which had also been released on ...But the Little Girls Understand, and also was written by Fieger and Averre. "(Havin' a) Rave Up" was written well before ...But the Little Girls Understand and was included in the band's live set even before their first album Get the Knack. Live performances of "(Havin' a) Rave Up" were included on the live LaserDisc of The Knack's 1979 concert at Carnegie Hall, The Knack Live at Carnegie Hall, and on a live CD of the band's 1978 concert in Los Angeles, Havin' a Rave Up. Dave Marsh of Rolling Stone claimed that the song was based on cliches from The Beatles and Buddy Holly. The Sydney Morning Herald claimed that the song was "more than a nod to Elvis." Cash Box called it "tasty mainstream rock ‘n’ roll as only The Knack could perform it."
