= Zoom (The Knack album) =

1998 album by The Knack

Studio album by the Knack
- Released: July 14, 1998
- Genre: Power pop
- Label: Rhino
- Producer: Richard Bosworth, the Knack, Oliver Leiber

The Knack chronology
Serious Fun (1991)	Zoom (1998)	Normal as the Next Guy (2001)

Singles from Zoom
- 1. "Pop Is Dead" Released: 1997; 2. "Love Is All There Is" Released: 1998; 3. "Terry & Julie Step Out" Released: 1998; 4. "In Blue Tonight" Released: 1998

Zoom is the fifth studio album released by the Knack in 1998. It marked a second attempted comeback by the Knack, after their first attempt in 1991 with Serious Fun fizzled. Terry Bozzio served as the drummer on the album in place of Bruce Gary. The album received positive reviews, including one that described it as the Knack's best effort since their debut album. The album was re-released several years later as Re-Zoom with three bonus tracks.

== Critical reception ==
Professional ratings
Review scores
Source	Rating
Allmusic	3/5 stars

Allmusic critic Steve Erlewine praised the album as the "best album the maligned power-pop band has recorded since their debut," Get The Knack. Writing in the Hartford Courant, Roger Catlin noted similarities between the opening song "Pop Is Dead", the Beatles' "And Your Bird Can Sing", and the Who's Tommy; he also noted similarities between the album's second song "Can I Borrow a Kiss" and the classic song "Needles and Pins." He commented that while the album initially seems "to be on a track to produce a classic in '60s rock emulation along the lines of Flamin' Groovies' Shake Some Action, some of the later tracks "disappoint." Author John Borack called the album "a stunning effort" and called it his favorite album of the year. Trouser Press referred to the album as "a good, solid effort" that "isn't at all bad as slick, commercial Beatlesque power pop goes" but also noted that "the Knack is firmly caught in a dead zone between nostalgia, irrelevance and scorn."

The lyrics to the song "Can I Borrow a Kiss" were based on an incident from when songwriter Doug Fieger visited Haight-Ashbury in San Francisco as a teenager, and a girl asked if she could borrow a kiss. Fieger noted that that kind of thing did not happen in his hometown of Oak Park, Michigan. The song "Terry & Julie Step Out" is based on the Kinks' song "Waterloo Sunset".

== Re-Zoom ==
Re-Zoom

Studio album by the Knack
- Released: 2003
- Genre: Power pop
- Label: Rhino
- Producer: Richard Bosworth, the Knack, Oliver Leiber

The Knack chronology
Normal as the Next Guy (2001)	Re-Zoom (2003)	Rock & Roll Is Good for You: The Fieger/Averre Demos (2012)

After the rights reverted to the band from its original label, the Knack re-released the album with additional tracks in 2003 under the title Re-Zoom. This release followed the band's next unsuccessful comeback with the album Normal as the Next Guy. Allmusic critic Steve Mason called Re-Zoom "probably the best Knack album since 1979's Get the Knack, with at least a few fine examples of pure L.A.–style power pop and a psychedelic closing ballad." Mason also noted that although the songs on the album did not have misogynist lyrics like earlier Knack songs, the lyrics are "still rather smug," and that lead singer Doug Fieger sings "with a self-satisfaction unwarranted by his flagrantly derivative musical sense." The additional tracks included covers of Badfinger's "No Matter What" and Elvis Costello's "Girls Talk."

== Track listing ==
1. "Pop Is Dead" (Berton Averre, Doug Fieger) - 3:47
2. "Can I Borrow a Kiss" (Berton Averre, Doug Fieger) - 4:03
3. "Smilin'" (Berton Averre, Doug Fieger) - 4:03
4. "Ambition" (Doug Fieger, Stan Lynch) - 4:28
5. "Mister Magazine" (Doug Fieger) - 4:02
6. "Everything I Do" (Melissa Connell, Doug Fieger) - 3:50
7. "Love Is All There Is" (Doug Fieger) - 4:13
8. "Terry & Julie Step Out" (Berton Averre, Doug Fieger) - 3:33
9. "Harder on You" (Prescott Niles, Berton Averre, Kim Amadril)- 3:05
10. "You Gotta Be There" (Doug Fieger) - 3:22
11. "Good Enough" (Berton Averre, Doug Fieger) - 4:49
12. "In Blue Tonight" (Doug Fieger) - 3:48
13. "Tomorrow" (Berton Averre, Doug Fieger, Prescott Niles, Kim Amadril )- 4:27
14. "(All in The) All in All" (Doug Fieger, Oliver Leiber) - 5:13

== Personnel ==
- Doug Fieger - lead vocals, rhythm guitar
- Berton Averre - lead guitar, backing vocals, keyboards
- Prescott Niles - bass
- Terry Bozzio - drums

== Re-Zoom track listing ==
As for the original album, with three additional tracks:

15. "No Matter What" (Pete Ham) - 2:54
16. "Girls Talk" (Elvis Costello) - 3:26
17. "Mister Magazine" (Instrumental) - 4:01
18. "Harder on You" Prescott Niles, Berton Averre, Kim Amadril, Doug Fieger
19. "Tomorrow" Prescott Niles, Berton Averre, Doug Fieger, Kim Amadril
