= Baby Talks Dirty =

1980 single by The Knack

Single by The Knack

from the album ...But the Little Girls Understand
- B-side: "End of the Game"
- Released: January 1980
- Recorded: December 1979
- Studio: MCA-Whitney Studios, Glendale, California
- Genre: Rock, new wave, power pop
- Length: 3:45
- Label: Capitol
- Songwriter(s): Doug Fieger, Berton Averre
- Producer(s): Mike Chapman

The Knack singles chronology
"Good Girls Don't" (1979)	"Baby Talks Dirty" (1980)	"Can't Put a Price on Love" (1980)

"Baby Talks Dirty" is a 1980 Top 40 single written by Doug Fieger and Berton Averre from the Knack's second album, ...But the Little Girls Understand. Like the album it was taken from, "Baby Talks Dirty" fell short of the success of its predecessors.

Whereas the Knack's first single, "My Sharona" reached #1 in the U.S., and its follow-up from their debut album Get the Knack, "Good Girls Don't" reached #11, "Baby Talks Dirty" only reached #30 in Cash Box and #38 on the Billboard Hot 100, spending just 2 weeks in the Top 40. The song did better in Canada, where it reached #13. It also reached #40 in New Zealand.

== Music and lyrics ==
Part of the song's lack of success has been attributed to its similarity to "My Sharona". The 1983 edition of The New Rolling Stone Record Guide referred to the song as a "'Sharona carbon copy." Allmusic's Chris Woodstra noted that the entire ...But the Little Girls Understand album is a "rewrite" of the band's first album, stating that this is "especially evident on the lead-off single 'Baby Talks Dirty.'" Author Tim English called "Baby Talks Dirty" "a transparent 'My Sharona' rewrite." Anne Sharp of The Michigan Daily pointed out similarities between "My Sharona" and "Baby Talks Dirty" with respect to "vocal arrangements," "guitar licks" and "subject matter, i.e., a sexually ardent young female." The Sydney Morning Herald also pointed out that "Baby Talks Dirty" "sounds for all the world like 'My Sharona.'" Jim Sullivan of the Bangor Daily News noted the songs' "structural similarity" and referred to "Baby Talks Dirty" as "My Sharona Mach II." Sullivan also criticizes Fieger's performance on the song as "whooping it up like a Sea World porpoise indulging in S&M games." Record World said that "slashing guitars & spanking percussion join desperate vocals creating a sound similar to 'My Sharona.'"

Another factor in the song's, and its album's, relative lack of chart success was its timing, being released a mere eight months after "My Sharona" and Get The Knack. This made the similarity between "My Sharona" and "Baby Talks Dirty" more jarring. Theodore Cateforis notes that "In this context, 'Baby Talks Dirty,' with its syncopated, bouncing octave eighth-note hook cut from the same mold as 'My Sharona,' sounded most of all as if the band had plagiarized itself." Fieger has stated that "We got a lot of criticism for 'Baby Talks Dirty.' Had that song come out on our fifth album, I think people would have said 'oh, they've gone back to their roots. They take the 'My Sharona' riff to another place.' But as it was, people were gunning for us." But Fieger has also stated that he doesn't think the song sounds like "My Sharona," other than the fact that "it's got a rhythmic G note that goes from G major to the seventh of the G."

"Baby Talks Dirty" was also given by critics as a prime example of the group's misogyny, where the girl in the song wants the singer to hurt her and "loves a real neat beating." In his review of ...But the Little Girls Understand, Rolling Stone critic Dave Marsh referred to the protagonist as "a foul-mouthed windup doll." The Associated Press stated that the song "contained enough orgasmic sounds to fill the next Sharon Stone movie." Cash Box said that the song has "the same infectious staccato guitar rock groove as on 'My Sharona,' as well as the thundering drum rolls" but warned that "the lyrical content is imbued with sexual connotation, so preview before playing." Classic Rock History critic Skip Anderson rated it as the Knack's 3rd best song despite noting the resemblance to "My Sharona".

Although Fieger believed that "Baby Talks Dirty" was an "honest song" that could have been successful, other members of the band acknowledged reservations with the lyrics. Averre acknowledged that the lyrics were "slimy," and may have gone too far over the line. Bassist Prescott Niles claims to have disliked the lyrics altogether, disliking that the woman in the song is asking for a beating and the moaning "ah"'s that follow her requests to be hurt. Producer Mike Chapman felt that the lyrics were "over the top" and that they represent Fieger being a "smart ass."

Fieger has acknowledged that, like many songs on the Knack's first two albums, "Baby Talks Dirty" was written about the same Sharona Alperin (girlfriend of Doug Fieger) who inspired "My Sharona".

== Other appearances ==
The Knack's follow up single to "Baby Talks Dirty" was "Can't Put a Price on Love," also from ...But the Little Girls Understand. That song peaked lower on the Billboard charts than "Baby Talks Dirty," peaking at #62. Subsequent to its appearance on ...But the Little Girls Understand, "Baby Talks Dirty" was released on a number of Knack compilation albums, including The Retrospective: The Best of the Knack (1992), Very Best of The Knack (1998) and Best of The Knack (1999). It also appeared on the 2002 live album and DVD Live From the Rock 'N' Roll Funhouse and the 2007 live DVD On Stage at World Cafe Live. It also appeared on the multiartist compilation album Rock of the 80's Vol. 5.

== Chart performance ==
Chart (1979)	Peak position
Canadian RPM Singles Chart	13
U.S. Cash Box Top 100	30
U.S. Billboard Hot 100	38
New Zealand Singles Chart	40

== "End of the Game" ==
"End of the Game"

Song by The Knack

from the album ...But the Little Girls Understand
- Released: January 1980
- Recorded: December 1979
- Studio: MCA-Whitney Studios, Glendale, California
- Length: 2:04
- Label: Capitol Records
- Songwriter(s): Doug Fieger
- Producer(s): Mike Chapman

The B-side of the "Baby Talks Dirty" single was "End of the Game," which was also a song from ...But the Little Girls Understand, and was written by Fieger. "End of the Game" was written well before ...But the Little Girls Understand and was included in the band's live set even before their first album Get the Knack. Live performances of "End of the Game" were included on the live LaserDisc of the Knack's 1979 concert at Carnegie Hall, The Knack Live at Carnegie Hall, and on a live CD of the band's 1978 concert in Los Angeles, Havin' a Rave Up. Dave Marsh of Rolling Stone claimed that the song was based on cliches from early Fleetwood Mac. The Sydney Morning Herald claimed that the song is "has shades of the Everly Brothers." Allmusic critic Mark Deming stated that the live version of "End of the Game" has "a joyous force nearly any act would envy."
