= ...But the Little Girls Understand =

Studio album by the Knack
- Released: February 15, 1980
- Recorded: December 1979
- Studio: MCA-Whitney, Glendale, California
- Genre: Power pop
- Label: Capitol
- Producer: Mike Chapman

The Knack chronology
Get the Knack (1979)	...But the Little Girls Understand (1980)	Round Trip (1981)

Singles from ...But the Little Girls Understand
- 1. "Baby Talks Dirty" Released: January 1980; 2. "Can't Put a Price on Love" Released: March 1980; 3. "I Want Ya" Released: 1980; 4. "It's You" Released: 1980; 5. "How Can Love Hurt So Much" Released: 1980; 6. "Mr. Handleman" Released: 1980

...But the Little Girls Understand is the second studio album by power pop/new wave group the Knack, released by Capitol Records in February 1980. The album reached the number 15 spot on the Billboard 200 album chart in 1980. The singles "Baby Talks Dirty" and "Can't Put a Price on Love" charted on the Billboard Hot 100 at No. 38 and No. 62, respectively. The song "Mr. Handleman" was released as a single in some countries, such as New Zealand. Guitarist Berton Averre has stated that "Mr. Handleman" was the first song he and lead singer Doug Fieger wrote together. The RIAA certified the album as Gold on April 14, 1980.

== Overview ==
The album's title is a reference to blues musician Willie Dixon's song "Back Door Man", which has the lyrics: "I'm a back door man. The men don't know, but the little girls understand." Recording was done at MCA-Whitney Studios in Glendale, where Mike Chapman—credited as "Commander" Chapman—produced the album. Chapman also wrote a comedic description of the album in the liner notes, including the line "The songs are an assortment of feelings expressed redundantly as only the Knack can. This record is very dear to me and my bank manager." Band members Berton Averre and Doug Fieger wrote all of the songs except for "The Hard Way" which was written by Ray Davies and recorded by the Kinks on their album Schoolboys in Disgrace (1975).

== Reception ==
Professional ratings
Review scores
Source	Rating
AllMusic	3/5 stars
Robert Christgau	C−
Record Mirror	2/5 stars

The album was a commercial disappointment, failing to match the immense commercial success of the band's 1979 debut Get the Knack. The album did, however, sell well enough to hit the No. 15 spot on the Billboard 200 album chart in 1980, propelled by the singles "Baby Talks Dirty" and "Can't Put a Price on Love" which both charted on the Billboard Hot 100 at No. 38 and No. 62, respectively. The RIAA certified the album as Gold on April 14, 1980, about two months after its release. Capitol Records released an expanded version of the album with bonus tracks in 2002.

Critic Dave Marsh of Rolling Stone, known for his utter disdain for most artists of the era, wrote a scathing review, commenting:

The music can't redeem the lyrics–not only because such dehumanization is irredeemable, but also because the music is lame. Indeed, the Knack are the most nefarious sort of hacks. They're terribly competent and they have a seemingly inexhaustible storehouse of clichés... the Knack's greatest achievement is to make hard-rock clichés sound completely gutless... Fieger's puling vocals suggest that, for him, the ultimate agony would be to imagine that somewhere in the world there exists a woman who might find him sexually unattractive. Compared to Doug Fieger, Rod Stewart is a paragon of sexual humility.

Specifically addressing some of the songs on the album, Marsh wrote "In Fieger's lyrics, women are literally commodities whose chief purpose is to be brutalized. The kid in 'Baby Talks Dirty' is a foul-mouthed windup doll, and in 'Mr. Handleman,' the tame calypso that's the new LP's catchiest number, the protagonist is pimping for his wife–a situation the group views with dispassion, if not outright approbation." He further wrote "All of Fieger's lyrics finally boil down to one sentiment: f*ck- me, honey. (When he's feeling ambitious, he writes something like 'Can't Put a Price on Love,' which translates: f*ck me for free, babe.)"

Trouser Press remarked that the band "replicated the sound" of their debut album, and described "Baby Talks Dirty" as "anemic" and an "inferior replicant of 'My Sharona' (minus the thunderous hook)." Trouser Press also remarked on the bad taste of some of the album's lyrics, giving "Mr. Handleman's" wife-pimping lyrics as an example. In a generally negative review, Robert Christgau stated that "little girls prefer catchy, punchy second-hand songs to varied, indecisive thirdhand ones. In fact, so do critics." On the other hand, critic Chris Woodstra of AllMusic has retrospectively given a positive opinion. He called the album "a good time for those who don't take rock & roll too seriously." Critic Steve "Spaz" Schnee of AllMusic has also stated that ...But the Little Girls Understand is "unfairly dismissed as an inferior rehash of the debut".

The album's front cover features Sharona Alperin, girlfriend of Doug Fieger, the young woman who had inspired the band's hit "My Sharona".

== Track listing ==
Original release

Side one
No.	Title	Writer(s)	Length
1.	"Baby Talks Dirty"	Doug Fieger; Berton Averre	3:46
2.	"I Want Ya"	Fieger	2:40
3.	"Tell Me You're Mine"	Fieger	3:54
4.	"Mr. Handleman"	Fieger; Averre	3:23
5.	"Can't Put a Price on Love"	Fieger; Averre	4:43
6.	"Hold on Tight and Don't Let Go"	Fieger	3:50

Side two
No.	Title	Writer(s)	Length
1.	"The Hard Way""	Ray Davies	2:13
2.	"It's You"	Fieger; Averre	2:09
3.	"End of the Game"	Fieger	2:03
4.	"The Feeling I Get"	Fieger	3:11
5.	"(Havin' a) Rave Up"	Fieger; Averre	1:46
6.	"How Can Love Hurt So Much"	Fieger	3:50

== Chart positions ==
Album

Year	Chart	Position
1980	Billboard 200	15
1980	Kent Music Report (Australia)	32

== Certifications ==
Region	Certification	Certified units/sales
Canada (Music Canada)	Platinum	100,000^{^}
United States (RIAA)	Gold	500,000^{^}
^{^} Shipments figures based on certification alone.

== Personnel ==
Personnel taken from ...But the Little Girls Understand liner notes.

The Knack

- Doug Fieger – vocals, rhythm guitar
- Berton Averre – lead guitar
- Prescott Niles – bass
- Bruce Gary – drums

Production

- Mike Chapman – production, liner notes
- Lenise Bent – engineering
- Peter Coleman – engineering, mix down engineering
