= Serious Fun (The Knack album) =

Studio album by the Knack
- Released: January 16, 1991
- Genre: Power pop
- Label: Charisma
- Producer: Don Was

The Knack chronology
Round Trip (1981)	Serious Fun (1991)	Zoom (1998)

Singles from Serious Fun
- 1. "Rocket O' Love" Released: 1991; 2. "Won't Let Go/Aces and Eights" Released: 1991; 3. "One Day at a Time" Released: 1991

Serious Fun is the fourth album by power pop/new wave band the Knack released by Charisma Records on January 16, 1991. It was their fourth record; a comeback after a decade-long separation. It was accompanied by a public reunion and tour. Although the album did not achieve either commercial or critical success, it resulted in the hit single "Rocket O' Love," which reached number 9 in Billboard's Mainstream Rock Chart.

== Overview ==
The album was released by Charisma Records on January 16, 1991. Musician Don Was, a member of the group Was (Not Was), produced the album. He was a friend of Knack frontman Doug Fieger since high school.

The Knack split up in 1981 just a few weeks after the release of Round Trip, which failed to achieve critical success although it reached number 93 in the Billboard 200. Serious Fun represented a reunion after around a decade of separation. The album represented a more hard rock sound for the band, reminiscent of the Raspberries. Serious Fun also failed to achieve either commercial or critical success. However, it resulted in the popular single "Rocket O' Love," which reached #9 in Billboard's Mainstream Rock Chart. The band created a rarely seen music video for the song. "One Day at a Time" was intended to be the second single from the album, but the label decided to stop promoting the album at the time of the intended release. According to Knack guitarist Berton Averre, an A&R man at the label thought "One Day at a Time" would be a hit but felt it would be preferable for the lead single to be a harder rock song, and so "Rocket O' Love" was released as the lead single. And apparently when the time came to release a second single, the label had lost interest in the band, and so buried the intended release of "One Day at a Time." Nevertheless, it did land on several Adult Contemporary stations and a handful of Contemporary Hit stations, but failed to chart.

The bomb-riding and lasso-waving scene from the 'Rocket O' Love' music video

A deluxe CD reissue complete with 24-bit digital remastering, bonus tracks, and detailed liner notes was released in 2002 by parent company Virgin Records. It includes a cover of the Martha & the Vandellas song "Nowhere to Run" done in the Knack's power pop style. The official website for the band states that: "The Knack's fourth studio album is serious fun! Some of the best music the band ever made."

The songs "I Want Love," "Rocket O' Love" and "One Day at a Time" were incorporated into the greatest hits album The Retrospective: The Best of the Knack, which was released by Capitol Records on November 16, 1992. "Rocket O' Love" was also included in the greatest hits album Very Best of the Knack, released by Rhino Records on May 19, 1998.

Classic Rock History critic Skip Anderson rated "Rocket O' Love" as the Knack's 5th best song, particularly praising the guitar riff and noting a resemblance to Foghat.

== Reception ==
Professional ratings
Review scores
Source	Rating
AllMusic	2/5 stars
The Encyclopedia of Popular Music	2/5 stars
Musician	(Unfavorable)
The Rolling Stone Album Guide	1/5 stars

Musician panned the album, stating that "Anyone who believes the musical legacy of the '70s is nothing to be ashamed of might want to reconsider after hearing this one." Critic Stewart Mason of AllMusic gave a mixed review. He remarked that even though "the songs are neat little packages of appropriately crunchy guitar hooks and harmonies", still "Serious Fun doesn't manage to be quite as much fun as it could be." Critic William Ruhlmann, also with AllMusic, commented that "it's hard to imagine anyone other than die-hard Knack fans expressing any interest in it." Walter Allread panned the album as uninspired, stating that it consisted of "12 new tunes that succeed only at making you want to hear 'My Sharona' again," but also conceded that "One Day at a Time" might have some radio success. The Rolling Stone Album Guide called the album "lumbering arena-rock."

== Track listing ==
All songs are by Berton Averre and Doug Fieger except where noted.

=== Original release ===
1. "Rocket O' Love" [3:10]
2. "I Want Love" [4:02] (Berton Averre, Doug Fieger, Prescott Niles, Pat Torpey)
3. "Serious Fun" [4:32]
4. "One Day at a Time" [4:25]
5. "River of Sighs" [5:30]
6. "Let's Get Lost" [4:10]
7. "Can Tickle" [0:40]
8. "Shine" [3:52]
9. "Won't Let Go/Aces & Eights" [4:55]
10. "Body Talk" [4:24] (Berton Averre, Doug Fieger, Prescott Niles, Pat Torpey)
11. "(I'll Be Your) Mau Mau" [3:52]
12. "Doin' the Dog" [3:45]

=== New release ===
All songs are by Berton Averre/Doug Fieger except where noted.

1. Rocket O' Love [3:10]
2. I Want Love [4:02] (Written by Berton Averre/Doug Fieger/Prescott Niles/Pat Torpey)
3. Serious Fun [4:32]
4. One Day at a Time [4:25]
5. River of Sighs [5:30]
6. Let's Get Lost [4:10]
7. Can Tickle [0:40]
8. Shine [3:52]
9. Won't Let Go/Aces & Eights [4:55]
10. Body Talk [4:24] (Written by Berton Averre/Doug Fieger/Prescott Niles/Pat Torpey)
11. (I'll Be Your) Mau Mau [3:52]
12. Doin' the Dog [3:45]
13. Down w/the Blond (Pts. I & II) [7:14]
14. The Spinning Song [3:43]
15. Nowhere to Run [3:56] (Written by Holland–Dozier–Holland)
16. A Prayer [4:15]

== Personnel ==
- Doug Fieger – lead vocals, rhythm guitar
- Berton Averre – lead guitar, backing vocals, keyboards
- Prescott Niles – bass
- Billy Ward – drums

== See also ==
- 1991 in music
- The Knack discography
