= The Chipmunks See Doctor Dolittle =

Studio album by Alvin and the Chipmunks with David Seville
- Released: 1968
- Recorded: 1968
- Genre: Children's music Novelty
- Length: 25:02
- Label: Sunset Records/Liberty Records
- Producer: Ross Bagdasarian

Alvin and the Chipmunks with David Seville chronology
| Chipmunks à Go-Go (1965) | The Chipmunks See Doctor Dolittle (1968) | The Chipmunks Go to the Movies (1969) |

Singles from The Chipmunks See Doctor Dolittle
- 1. "Talk to the Animals" Released: 1968

The Chipmunks See Doctor Dolittle is a 1968 album by Alvin and the Chipmunks with David Seville, released by Sunset Records.

The storyline linking each song consists of the Chipmunks and Dave having just finished viewing the musical film Doctor Dolittle starring Rex Harrison with songs by Leslie Bricusse. Alvin, Simon and Theodore enjoyed the film so much that they beg Dave to let them see it again, who agrees on the condition that they allowed themselves to be quizzed on different aspects of the plot.

One single was released from the album: "Talk to the Animals" b/w "My Friend the Doctor".

The Chipmunks See Doctor Dolittle has never been reissued on CD or as a digital download.

== Track listing ==
All songs written by Leslie Bricusse.

=== Side One ===
1. "Doctor Dolittle" – 2:56
2. "My Friend the Doctor" – 4:32
3. "Talk to the Animals" – 3:42
4. "When I Look In Your Eyes" – 2:39

=== Side Two ===
1. "Fabulous Places" – 3:01
2. "I've Never Seen Anything Like It" – 2:30
3. "Beautiful Things" – 3:07
4. "Finale: Doctor Dolittle/My Friend the Doctor" – 2:04
