= Platonic =

Plato's influence on Western culture was so profound that several different concepts are linked by being called Platonic or Platonist, for accepting some assumptions of Platonism, but which do not imply acceptance of that philosophy as a whole. It may also refer to:

- Platonic love, a relationship that is not sexual in nature
- Platonic forms, or the theory of forms, Plato's model of existence
- Platonic idealism
- Platonic solid, any of the five convex regular polyhedra
- Platonic crystal, a periodic structure designed to guide wave energy through thin plates
- Platonism, the philosophy of Plato (Classical period)
- Middle Platonism, a later philosophy derived from that of Plato (1st century BC to 3rd century AD)
- Neoplatonism, a philosophic school of Late Antiquity deriving from Plato (starting in the 3rd century AD)
- Platonism in the Renaissance
- Platonic (TV series)
