= The Chipmunks Sing the Beatles Hits =

Studio album by Alvin and the Chipmunks with David Seville
- Released: 1964
- Recorded: 1964
- Genre: Children's music
- Length: 28:21
- Label: Sunset; Liberty
- Producer: Ross Bagdasarian

Alvin and the Chipmunks with David Seville chronology
| Christmas with The Chipmunks, Vol. 2 (1963) | The Chipmunks Sing the Beatles Hits (1964) | The Chipmunks Sing with Children (1965) |

Singles from The Chipmunks Sing the Beatles Hits
- 1. "All My Loving" Released: 1964; 2. "She Loves You" Released: 1964 (Germany); 3. "All My Loving" Released: 1964 (Netherlands)

Professional ratings
Review scores
| Source | Rating |
|---|---|
| Allmusic | 4/5 stars |
| Record Mirror | 3/5 stars |

The Chipmunks Sing the Beatles Hits is a tribute album of Alvin and the Chipmunks singing the hits of the Beatles. It was originally released in 1964 by Liberty Records on vinyl record, and consists of Chipmunk renditions of early Beatles hits. This was the first Beatles tribute album.

One single was released from the album ("All My Loving" b/w "Do You Want to Know a Secret?") and a six-song stereo jukebox EP was also issued. On later pressings on the Sunset label and all reissues on vinyl, cassette and compact disc since, the opening guitar chord on the song "Do You Want to Know a Secret?" is partially cut off.

The album debuted on the Billboard 200 album chart at number 110 for the week ending September 5, 1964. Six weeks later, the album peaked at number 14 on the albums chart for the week ending October 10, 1964. It remained on the albums chart for more than five months.

The Chipmunks are not involved in any incidents on the recordings, however, during the instrumental of "Twist and Shout", Dave Seville tells Alvin that his wig is falling off and to fix it, with Alvin yelling "Okay! Okay!" and then the sound of Alvin fixing the wig with muffled tones.

== Production ==
For his work on the album, engineer Dave Hassinger won the 1964 Grammy Award for Best Engineered Recording – Special Or Novel Effects.

== Reception ==
In a December 1982 Goldmine magazine interview, Ross Bagdasarian Jr. remembered that his father "thought it would be a cute idea for a Chipmunk record and he spoke with the Beatles. When he was in London, he even met the Beatles, who were very supportive of the idea."

== Track listing ==
All songs written by Lennon–McCartney unless otherwise noted.

=== Side one ===
1. "All My Loving" – 2:21
2. "Do You Want to Know a Secret" – 2:04
3. "She Loves You" – 2:14
4. "From Me to You" – 1:57
5. "Love Me Do" – 2:18
6. "Twist and Shout" (Phil Medley, Bert Russell) – 2:39

=== Side two ===
1. "A Hard Day's Night" – 2:47
2. "P.S. I Love You" – 2:21
3. "I Saw Her Standing There" – 2:57
4. "Can't Buy Me Love" – 2:07
5. "Please Please Me" – 2:05
6. "I Want to Hold Your Hand" – 2:36

== See also ==
- List of cover versions of Beatles songs
