= Chipmunks à Go-Go =

Studio album by David Seville and Alvin and the Chipmunks
- Released: 1965
- Recorded: 1965
- Genre: Pop, children's
- Length: 28:54
- Label: Sunset Records/Liberty Records
- Producer: Dave Pell

David Seville and Alvin and the Chipmunks chronology
| The Chipmunks Sing with Children (1965) | Chipmunks à Go-Go (1965) | The Chipmunks See Doctor Dolittle (1968) |

Singles from Chipmunks à Go-Go
- 1. "What's New Pussycat?" Released: 1980

Professional ratings
Review scores
| Source | Rating |
|---|---|
| Allmusic | 2.5/5 stars |

Chipmunks à Go-Go is an album by Alvin and the Chipmunks and David Seville, released by Liberty Records in 1965, again in 1982, and on compact disc in 1990.

Early pressings of the album incorrectly list the song "Sunshine, Lollipops and Rainbows" as "Sunshine, Lollipops and Roses".

David Seville does not appear on the album, nor are there any incidents between Seville and the three Chipmunks. Chipmunks à Go-Go also marked the only occasion that Ross Bagdasarian did not provide the singing voices of the Chipmunks. Given the variety of musical styles covered, Bagdasarian opted to hire professional studio performers to handle vocal duties.

== Track listing ==
Side One
| No. | Title | Original Artist | Length |
|---|---|---|---|
| 1. | "What's New Pussycat?" (Burt Bacharach, Hal David) | Tom Jones | 2:30 |
| 2. | "This Diamond Ring" (Al Kooper, Bob Brass, Irwin Levine) | Gary Lewis & the Playboys | 2:20 |
| 3. | "Mr. Tambourine Man" (Bob Dylan) | Bob Dylan | 2:22 |
| 4. | "Mrs. Brown, You've Got a Lovely Daughter" (Trevor Peacock) | Herman's Hermits | 2:53 |
| 5. | "I'm a Fool" (Red West, Joey Cooper) | Dino, Desi & Billy | 2:38 |
| 6. | "Sunshine, Lollipops and Rainbows" (Marvin Hamlisch, Howard Leibling) | Lesley Gore | 1:43 |

Side Two
| No. | Title | Original Artist | Length |
|---|---|---|---|
| 1. | "The Race Is On" (Don Rollins) | Jack Jones | 1:43 |
| 2. | "King of the Road" (Roger Miller) | Roger Miller | 2:10 |
| 3. | "Downtown" (Tony Hatch) | Petula Clark | 2:55 |
| 4. | "California Girls" (Brian Wilson, Mike Love) | The Beach Boys | 2:40 |
| 5. | "The 'In' Crowd" (Billy Page) | Dobie Gray | 2:54 |
| 6. | "I'm Henry the VIII, I Am" (Fred Murray, R. P. Weston) | Herman's Hermits | 2:11 |

"Sunshine, Lollipops and Rainbows" and "The Race Is On" were deleted for the 1982 re-release.
