= Sky (American band) =

American music group (1970–1973)

- Origin: Detroit, Michigan, U.S.
- Genres: Power pop; folk rock
- Years active: 1969–1973
- Label: RCA
- Past members: Doug Fieger; John Coury; Rob Stawinski; Bob Greenfield

Sky was an American music trio from Detroit, Michigan, that were active during the late 1960s and early 1970s. They played a mixture of pop, rock and roll and folk, presaging the power pop movement of the mid-1970s.

They released two studio albums with RCA—Don't Hold Back in 1970 and Sailor's Delight in 1971—before disbanding in 1973 but are best known for starting the career of Doug Fieger, who would later find success as the frontman and singer of the Knack.

== History ==
The group was formed in around 1969 in the Detroit area. It consisted of Doug Fieger (bass, lead vocals), John Coury (guitar, backing vocals, keyboards) and Bob Greenfield (drums). The band was formed as their members finished high school. Rob Stawinski (drums, backing vocals) replaced Bob after their first album was released. Sky gained a local following after serving as an opening act for popular groups such as the Stooges, the Who, Jethro Tull, Traffic, the Jeff Beck Group and Joe Cocker.

The band's sound was a mixture of rock and roll, folk and pop, hearkening back to the mid-1960s while presaging the power pop movement of the mid-1970s. They incorporated three-part-harmonies into their music and were also influenced by Traffic.

The group put out two albums on RCA, Don't Hold Back (1970) and Sailor's Delight (1971), both produced in England by Jimmy Miller, who had also produced Traffic and the Rolling Stones. They released the low-charting single "Goodie Two Shoes", which they performed on American Bandstand on February 27, 1971.

After relocating to Los Angeles, the band appeared in the 1971 exploitation film Private Duty Nurses, from Roger Corman's New World Pictures. Director George Armitage cast them in the film after seeing them perform at a high school.

Sky broke up in 1973, shortly after their second album's release. Fieger then toured with the Carpenters and worked with Triumvirat and the Sunset Bombers before forming the Knack with lead guitarist Berton Averre, drummer Bruce Gary and bassist Prescott Niles. Coury later worked with the Eagles, Don Henley, Rod Stewart and Jude Cole. Stawinski toured with Badfinger before returning to the local music scene in Detroit.

== Band members ==
- Doug Fieger – vocals, bass
- John Coury – guitar, keyboards, backing vocals
- Rob Stawinski – drums, backing vocals
- Bob Greenfield – drums

== Discography ==
- Don't Hold Back (1970)
- Sailor's Delight (1971)

== See also ==
- Music of Detroit
- 1970s in music
