= The Chipmunks Sing with Children =

Studio album by Alvin and the Chipmunks
- Released: January 1, 1965
- Genre: Children's music
- Length: 26:29
- Label: Liberty Records
- Producer: Don Blocker

Alvin and the Chipmunks chronology
The Chipmunks Sing the Beatles Hits (1964)	The Chipmunks Sing with Children (1965)	Chipmunks à Go-Go (1965)

Singles from The Chipmunks Sing with Children
- 1. "Supercalifragilisticexpialidocious" Released: 1965

Professional ratings
Review scores
Source	Rating
Record Mirror	3/5 stars

The Chipmunks Sing with Children is an album by Alvin and the Chipmunks with David Seville. It was released on January 1, 1965, by Liberty Records.

== Track listing ==
Side One
No.	Title	Writer(s)	Length
1.	"Do-Re-Mi"	Richard Rodgers, Oscar Hammerstein II	2:20
2.	"Rag Mop"	Johnnie Lee Wills, Deacon Anderson	2:03
3.	"Me Too (Ho-Ho! Ha-Ha!)"	Harry M. Woods, Charles Tobias, Al Sherman	2:32
4.	"Mr. Sandman"	Pat Ballard	1:58
5.	"Hello, Dolly!"	Jerry Herman	2:15
6.	"Puff, the Magic Dragon"	Leonard Lipton, Peter Yarrow	2:43

Side Two
No.	Title	Writer(s)	Length
7.	"Tonight You Belong to Me"	Billy Rose, Lee David	2:17
8.	"Supercalifragilisticexpialidocious"	Robert B. Sherman, Richard M. Sherman	2:05
9.	"Tea for Two"	Vincent Youmans, Irving Caesar	2:20
10.	"Que Sera, Sera (Whatever Will Be, Will Be)"	Jay Livingston, Ray Evans	1:50
11.	"Mississippi Mud"	Harry Barris	1:45
12.	"Down by the Old Mill Stream"	Tell Taylor	2:21
Total length:			26:29

Tracks 8 and 10 were reissued on The Chipmunks Go to the Movies (1969)

== Production ==
Credits adapted from 1965 vinyl release.

- Ross Bagdasarian – Alvin, Simon, Theodore, David Seville
- Jimmy Joyce Children's Chorus – chorus
- Pete King – arranger
- Bob Doherty – engineer
- Rober Marshutz – cover photograph
