= Platonic crystal =

Platonic crystals are periodic structures which are designed to guide flexural wave energy through thin elastic plates.

The term platonic crystal is formed by analogy to photonic crystals, phononic crystals, and plasmonic crystals. The name emphasizes a thin plate formulation, which is governed by a fourth order partial differential equation, as opposed to a second order equation which governs other types of crystals. There are also strong connections between platonic crystals and metamaterials.

The study of platonic crystals is referred to as platonics, and does not refer to the teachings of Plato, or the Platonic solids. The term is now in common usage by multiple research groups in Australia, New Zealand, France, and the United Kingdom.

== Applications ==
The types of platonic structures that have been examined include arrays of perforations, arrays of pins, arrays of point masses, as well as periodic variations in the plate material itself. Platonic crystals have been shown to exhibit a number of behaviours similar to photonic crystals, including negative refraction, beam splitting, and wave trapping. They may also feature large stopbands where wave propagation is not possible through the crystal, as well as cloaking near degenerate band surfaces. Investigations into defective platonic crystals has also revealed strong energy localization effects within the defects, with high quality factors.

Experimental work in platonics to date has shown promising results in cloaking and flat lens focusing of flexural wave energy.
