= Peter Goddard (journalist) =

Canadian music journalist

Peter Darwin Goddard (born July 13, 1943 – March 23, 2022) was a Canadian music and culture journalist for Toronto-area newspapers starting with the Globe and Mail, the Toronto Telegram, and for most of his career, the Toronto Star.

He started writing music criticism while still an undergraduate student at the University of Toronto's Varsity newspaper. In the 1980s, he wrote ten books on popular music. He also freelanced as a film critic, mostly for the Toronto Star in the 1990s onwards.

== History ==
Peter Goddard was a pupil of Margaret Butler (piano) at The Royal Conservatory of Music and of Mieczyslaw Kolinski (musicology) and Gustav Ciamaga (electronic music) at the University of Toronto. Goddard played piano in a succession of Toronto rock groups, then began his career as a journalist in 1966 concurrently with studying music. He obtained Bachelor and Master degrees in music in 1967 and 1971, respectively.

From 1966 to 1988, Goddard held positions as the pop music critic for The Globe and Mail (1966 – 1967) the Toronto Telegram (1968 – 1971) and the Toronto Star (1972 – 1988). He received the 1972 Juno Award as Journalist of The Year.

Goddard maintained an ongoing association with the Toronto Star, for which he continued to write in other editorial capacities.

Goddard also has written for many magazines (Maclean's, Saturday Night, RPM, Canadian Composer, etc) and is the author of the biography Frank Sinatra (Don Mills, Ont, 1973) and the novel The Sounding (Toronto 1988), and co-author with Ronnie Hawkins of Ronnie Hawkins: Last of the Good Old Boys (Toronto 1989). With the Toronto photographer Philip Kamin, Goddard collaborated on 10 books, published 1982-6 in Toronto, documenting concert tours during the early and mid-1980s by the Rolling Stones, the Who, David Bowie, Duran Duran, Genesis, Michael Jackson, the Police, Van Halen, the Cars, and Cyndi Lauper. Goddard also edited The Video Hits Book (Toronto 1986, for the CBC-TV series 'Video Hits') and with Kamin co-edited the collection of essays Shakin' All Over: The Rock 'N' Roll Years in Canada (Toronto 1989).

== Death ==
Goddard died after a battle with glioblastoma at Toronto Grace Health Centre on March 23, 2022. He was married to Carol Ann Goddard for 52 years and had one child and several grandchildren at the time of his death.

== Publications ==
=== Non-Fiction ===
- 1989 Ronnie Hawkins - Last of The Good Ol' Boys (with Ronnie Hawkins) (Stoddart)
- 1989 Shakin' All Over: The Rock 'n' Roll Years in Canada (with Philip Kamin, as co-editor) (McGraw-Hill)
- 1986 The Video Hits Book (with Philip Kamin) (CBC Enterprises)
- 1986 The Cars (with Philip Kamin) (McGraw-Hill)
- 1986 Triumph: The Book (with Philip Kamin) (Goddard and Kamin Publishing)
- 1986 Cyndi Lauper (with Philip Kamin) (McGraw-Hill)
- 1984 Michael Jackson & The Jacksons Live On Tour In '84 (with Philip Kamin) (St. Martin's Press)
- 1984 Van Halen (with Philip Kamin) (Stoddart)
- 1984 Duran Duran Live (with Philip Kamin) (St. Martin's Press)
- 1984 Genesis: Peter Gabriel, Phil Collins and Beyond (with Philip Kamin; introduction by Phil Collins) (Beaufort)
- 1984 The Police Chronicles (with Philip Kamin) (Musson)
- 1984 Springsteen Live (with Philip Kamin) (Stoddart)
- 1983 David Bowie - Out of The Cool (with Philip Kamin) (Beaufort)
- 1983 The Who - The Farewell Tour (with Philip Kamin) (Musson)
- 1982 The Rolling Stones: The Last Tour (with Philip Kamin) (Olympia)
- 1973 Frank Sinatra - The Man, The Myth and The Music (Greywood)
- 2017 The Great Gould (Dundurn Press)

=== Fiction ===
- 1989 The Sounding (General Publishing)
