= Bruce Gary =

American drummer

- Born: Bruce Gary; April 7, 1951; Burbank, California, U.S.
- Died: August 22, 2006 (aged 55) Tarzana, California, U.S.
- Genres: Rock; power pop; blues-rock; blues
- Occupations: Musician; producer
- Instruments: Drums; percussion
- Years active: 1969–2006
- Formerly of: The Knack; Bang

Bruce Gary (April 7, 1951 – August 22, 2006) was an American musician who was best known as the drummer for the music group the Knack. He was nominated for two Grammy Awards as a stage performer, producer, and recording artist.

Born in Burbank, California, the young Gary had a lot of energy so his parents allowed him to set up the drum kit that his cousin had offered him after getting bored with it. Gary left home at 15 and was drawn to the musical scene of Topanga Canyon, California. He made friends with guitarist Randy California. In the 1960s and early 1970s he played with bluesman Albert Collins. By the time he was twenty-four he was touring and recording with former Cream bassist Jack Bruce and guitarist Mick Taylor, who had just left the Rolling Stones. This stellar lineup also included jazz pianist Carla Bley. Gary also worked with Dr. John in the 1970s.

In 1978, singer Doug Fieger asked him to join a group with guitarist Berton Averre. The three were subsequently joined by bassist Prescott Niles. Fieger and Averre brought in a tune they'd written about Sharona Alperin (girlfriend of Doug Fieger), a teenage girl Fieger was obsessed with. Despite his initial reservations about the song, Gary came up with a beat to match "My Sharona"'s stuttering style. He later said he approached the song like a surf stomp. As he explained, drummers in surf bands often play songs using no cymbals, just kick drum, snare drum, and toms. He also borrowed from the drum part to "Going to a Go Go" by Smokey Robinson and The Miracles. The final ingredient, he said, was the drum rudiment called a flam, in which one drumstick strikes the drum just before the other does; the flam registers as a single beat, but with a particularly full sound. Gary's immediately recognisable kick-and-snare-drum intro helped propel the power-pop anthem to the top of the US charts.

The Knack's debut album Get the Knack sold 6 million copies.

After the breakup of the Knack in the early 1980s, Gary became an in-demand drummer for studio work and live performance with musicians including Bob Dylan, George Harrison, Stephen Stills, Rod Stewart, Bette Midler, The Ventures, Harry Nilsson, Robby Krieger, Jack Bruce, Mick Taylor, Cherie Currie, Spencer Davis, Emmett Chapman, and Sheryl Crow. He also worked with blues masters Albert King and John Lee Hooker.

In addition to his work as a drummer, he achieved recognition for his work as a producer, recording new albums with the Ventures and co-producing (with Alan Douglas) a series of seminal archival recordings of Jimi Hendrix including the Blues compilation.

== Death ==
Gary died on August 22, 2006 at the age of 55 at the Tarzana Regional Medical Center in Tarzana, California, of non-Hodgkin lymphoma.
