= Good Girls Don't =

1979 single by the Knack

Single by The Knack

from the album Get the Knack
- B-side: "Frustrated"
- Released: August 1979
- Genre: Power pop; new wave
- Length: 3:07
- Label: Capitol
- Songwriter: Doug Fieger
- Producer: Mike Chapman

The Knack singles chronology
| "My Sharona" (1979) | "Good Girls Don't" (1979) | "Baby Talks Dirty" (1980) |

"Good Girls Don't" is a 1979 hit single written by Doug Fieger and released by power pop band The Knack, on their album Get the Knack. It was the follow-up to the group's number-one hit single, "My Sharona". "Good Girls Don't" was a No. 1 hit in Canada. It reached #11 on the Billboard Hot 100, #10 in Record World, and #11 in Cash Box, as well as No. 66 on the United Kingdom chart. It also reached No. 20 in New Zealand. The song has since been covered by a number of artists, including The Chipmunks, Ben Folds, The Chubbies, and The McRackins.

== Writing and recording ==
Fieger originally wrote "Good Girls Don't" in 1972, and claimed that he wrote the song with Johnny Cash's voice in mind. He had included it on three or four demos in various attempts to get a recording contract, including with The Knack. It was also one of the first songs The Knack recorded. They had made a demo which included "Good Girls Don't" and "That's What the Little Girls Do" in 1978, despite which the band was turned down multiple times in their efforts to get their first record contract. By the time The Knack was recording Get the Knack, he was tired of the song and reluctant to record it, but was convinced by producer Mike Chapman to attempt one take. That one take was used on the album.

== Lyrics and music ==
"Good Girls Don't" begins with Fieger playing the harmonica, in a part which authors Michael Uslan and Bruce Solomon liken to The Beatles' song "I Should Have Known Better." The lyrics, such as the refrain "She'll be telling you 'good girls don't but I do,'" were considered misogynistic by some critics. However, Joyce Canaan of the CCCS wrote that this line succinctly captures the transformation of teenage girls' representations of their sexual practices; while they want to be seen as "good girls", even good girls may engage in practices not corresponding to established moral standards. Fieger has stated that "All we were doing in songs like the naughty 'Good Girls Don't' was reflecting the way 14-year-old boys feel. And there's a little 14-year-old boy in all of us. I think that's why the record did so well." Other lyrics that created controversy included the lines:

"And she makes you want to scream; wishing you could get inside her pants" (this line was re-recorded as "wishing she was givin' you a chance" on the "clean" single release), and:

And it's a teenage sadness
Everyone has got to taste.
An in-between age madness
That you know you can't erase
Til she's sitting on your face (and it hurts!).

The "clean" single edit also changed this last line to "when she puts you in your place", which led to criticism this changed the meaning of the song. Spin critic Doug Brod claimed that another song from Get the Knack, "That's What the Little Girls Do" was the Knack's own answer to "Good Girls Don't". Like some other power pop songs, such as Blondie's "Hanging on the Telephone" and "Sunday Girl", as well as The Beatles' "Please Please Me" and "I Want to Hold Your Hand", the drumming pattern of "Good Girls Don't" employs a double backbeat rhythm.

== Critical reception ==
Critic Chris Woodstra of AllMusic retrospectively described the song as an "unforgettable hit". Robert Hilburn of the Los Angeles Times called it the highlight of Get the Knack and suggested had similar flavor to early songs by Sweet. Critic Greil Marcus described the song as a "smutty little Beatles imitation". Author John Borack described the song as "a mean pop tune", noting too that in the song lead singer and songwriter Fieger comes off "like a leering, sexist twit with hormones a-raging." Billboard described the song as "a cleverly worded, youth-oriented melodic rocker" and referred to the song's "hearty harmonica" part and Beatle-esque harmonies, noting that "the music is delivered in tight little notes at top speed." Cash Box said that it is "in the same quick, slick mode of immensely infectious pop-rock geared directly to the teenage market both musically and lyrically" as "My Sharona." Record World said that "The hook is right for teen rockers."

Audio described the song as "irresistible". Wayne Wadhams, David Nathan and Susan Gedutis Lindsay described the song as a "well written pop tune" and note that the music is prettier than "My Sharona" and contains harmonies similar to those in songs by The Searchers and The Hollies. However, they also go on to note that the lyric "portrays a character more doggedly bent on sex than naturally aroused" and represents a "leering, postpubescent sales pitch by a dirty young man." J. J. Syrja of The Seguin Gazette said that with this song the Knack "[struck] pure teenage delirium." Other critics regarded the song as "derivative" and "sexist".

== Chart performance ==
=== Weekly charts ===
| Chart (1979) | Peak position |
|---|---|
| Canada RPM Top Singles | 1 |
| New Zealand Singles Chart | 20 |
| UK Singles Chart | 66 |
| U.S. Billboard Hot 100 | 11 |
| U.S. Cash Box Top 100 | 11 |

=== Year-end charts ===
| Chart (1979) | Rank |
|---|---|
| Canada | 33 |
| U.S. Cash Box | 83 |
| U.S. (Joel Whitburn's Pop Annual) | 83 |

== Other appearances ==
"Good Girls Don't" was also released on The Knack's compilation albums The Retrospective: The Best of the Knack (1992), The Very Best of The Knack (1998) and Best of The Knack (1999). The band made a music video of the song as well. A live version also appears on the 2002 live album and DVD Live from the Rock 'N' Roll Funhouse and on the 2012 live CD Havin' a Rave Up, taken from a 1978 concert in Los Angeles. It was part of the Carnegie Hall concert that was released on Laserdisc. It was also included on a number of multiband compilation albums, such as Greatest Hits of the 70's and Party Starter: 80s Mix.

== "Frustrated" ==
"Frustrated"

Song by The Knack

from the album Get the Knack
- Released: June 11, 1979
- Recorded: April 1979
- Studio: The Record Plant (New York)
- Length: 3:51
- Label: Capitol Records
- Songwriters: Doug Fieger, Berton Averre
- Producer: Mike Chapman

"Frustrated", written by Fieger and Knack guitarist Berton Averre, was the B-side of "Good Girls Don't". Like a number of songs on Get the Knack, such as "My Sharona", "Frustrated" was inspired by Fieger's girlfriend Sharona Alperin, and reflected Fieger's real life frustration at the fact that he had a crush on her, but she was keeping him at arm's length (they eventually had a relationship). Lyrics include lines such as "She'll make you weak and out of breath, feeling like you're done to death." Jack Lloyd of Knight Ridder described it as a song of teen-age woe. The Knack also included "Frustrated" on the live DVD On Stage at World Cafe Live released in 2007. Although not released as an A-side, the band made a promotional music video of the song.

Billboard described "Frustrated" as "The Rolling Stones' answer to Sharona", and called it one of the album's "best tracks". Ken Tucker of Rolling Stone called "Frustrated" a "neck breaker" and considered the song an "artfully veiled metaphor for their leader's professional ambitions", which describes Fieger as "an ingenious overreacher just now closing in on his real goal of securing power by whipping up a pop-rock treat that'll have kids begging to rot their minds on it." Ira Robbins and Michael Sandlin of Trouser Press described the song as a "tight guitar pop" song which described women as "prick-teases". Author John Borack described "Frustrated" like "Good Girls Don't" as a "mean pop tune" in which Fieger comes off "like a leering, sexist twit with hormones a-raging." Pete Bishop of the Pittsburgh Press claimed that "Frustrated" "lean(s) towards bubblegum". Critic S. Victor Aaron of Something Else! praised the song's "huge backbeat", "lively bass line" and "thick slab of guitar riffs" as well as Fieger's "impishly sung lyrics". Aaron summed up "Frustrated" as a "perfect danceable tough rocker for any party" and noted that it got significant airplay on AOR radio stations. Audio magazine called it a "basher" with "plenty of style". Tina Maples of the Milwaukee Journal Sentinel praised its "hooky effervescence". Charla Wasel of The Evening Independent described it as a song "with which we can all relate." The Knack bassist Prescott Niles described the song as "catchy" and noted that it was "a big crowd favorite".

Like "Good Girls Don't" and "My Sharona", "Frustrated" was covered by the Chipmunks on their album Chipmunk Punk. The Chipmunks' version incorporates an excerpt from the Rolling Stones' song "(I Can't Get No) Satisfaction". Dave Grohl and Greg Kurstin covered “Frustrated” for their “Hanukkah Sessions” in 2020.
