= Girlfriend =

Regular female companion in a platonic, romantic or sexual relationship

A girlfriend is a woman who is a friend, acquaintance or partner to the speaker, usually a female companion with whom one is platonically, romantically, or sexually involved. In a romantic context, this normally signifies a committed relationship where the individuals are not married. Other titles, for example "wife", usually signify that the individuals are legally married.

The analogous term for men is "boyfriend".

== Scope ==
Partners in committed relationships are also sometimes described as "significant others" or simply "partners", especially if the individuals are cohabiting.

"Girlfriend" and "partner" mean different things to different people, and the distinctions between the terms are subjective. How the term is used will ultimately be determined by personal preference.

In 2005, a study was conducted of 115 people ages 21 to 35 who were either living with or had lived with a romantic partner. It notes that the lack of proper terms often leads to awkward situations, such as someone becoming upset over not being introduced in a social situation to avoid the question of their relationship.

There exists some ambiguity between the terms "girl friend," or a friend who is female, and "girlfriend." The transition between the two is a significant aspect of adolescent development.

Both forms of "girlfriend" and "girl friend" are used by different people to mean different things. For example, when the term "girlfriend" is used by a woman about another woman in a non-sexual, non-romantic context, the two-word form "girl friend" is sometimes used to avoid confusion with the sexual or romantic meaning. In this sense of its usage, "girlfriend" is used in terms of very close friends and has no sexual connotations, unless it, for example, is in the case of lesbian, bisexual or pansexual women. The term "girlfriend" is also used in LGBT communities and can refer to people of any sex or sexuality.

The term "girlfriend" does not necessarily imply a sexual relationship, but is often used to refer to a girl or woman who is dating a person she is not engaged to without indicating whether she is having sex with them. With differing expectations of sexual mores, the term "dating" can imply romantic activity whereas simply using "friend" would likely avoid implying such intimacy. It is essentially equivalent to the term "sweetheart", which has also been used as a term of endearment. A similar relationship wherein there is no exclusivity is sometimes referred to by terms such as friend with benefits.

=== Style guides ===
As of 2007, The New York Times style guide discouraged the use of the term "girlfriend" for an adult romantic partner: "Companion is a suitable term for an unmarried partner of the same or the opposite sex." The Times received some criticism for referring to Shaha Riza as the "girlfriend" of World Bank president Paul Wolfowitz in one article about the controversy over their relationship. Other news articles in the Times had generally referred to her as Wolfowitz's "companion".

The 2015 edition of the New York Times Manual of Style states, however, that the view on the term "girlfriend" as being informal is now relegated to the realm of traditionalism, and that it has become accepted to use "girlfriend" and "boyfriend" to describe people of all ages (with consideration given to the preferences of the people involved).

== History of usage ==
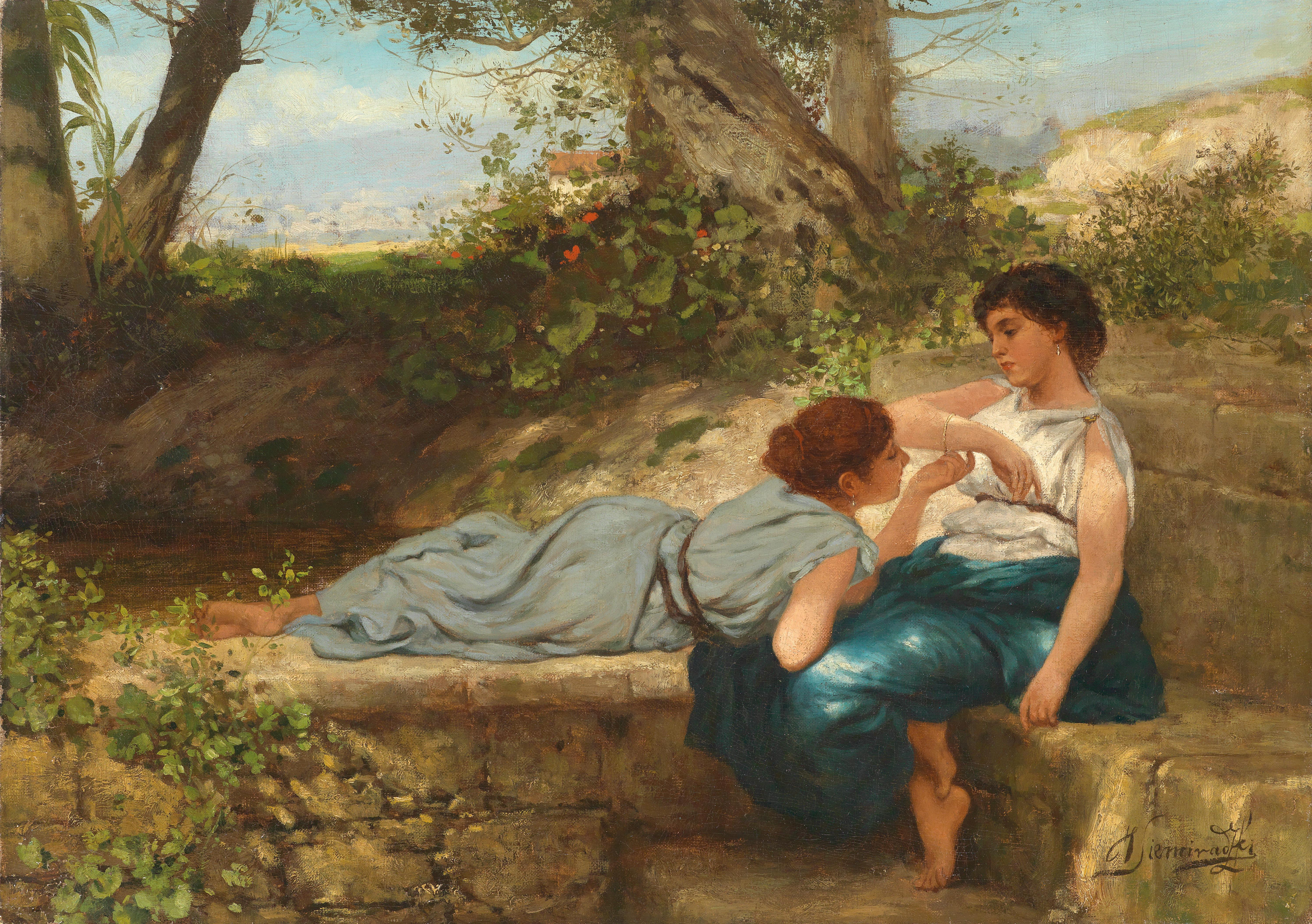
Henryk Siemiradzki's Conversation, depicting a lesbian couple

According to the Oxford English Dictionary, the earliest meaning of the word "girlfriend", from 1859 on, was to designate "a female friend; esp. a woman's close female friend". This was to distinguish from "friend" alone, which was being used by women to denote a male suitor, beau, or companion. In the late 1800s, it took on the meaning of "A female with whom a person has a romantic or sexual relationship".

== Related terms ==
- A female engaged in an extramarital relationship with a married man is frequently considered a "mistress". The word "mistress" was originally used as a neutral counterpart for the words "mister" or "master".
- The word "madam" is still a respectful form of address, but has had sexual connotations since the early 18th century and has been used to refer to the owner of a brothel since the early 20th century.
- Some terms of endearment directed to females, a romantic relationship not required, are "darling", "sweetheart", "love", etc.
- Users of Internet slang and SMS slang often shorten "girlfriend" to the initialism "gf".
- Additionally, gender-indiscriminate terms also apply (e.g., lover, heartthrob, paramour, squeeze, sweetheart, true love, wooer, date, steady, admirer, bae, or companion).

== Distinction from "lady friend" ==
A similar, but not equivalent, concept is the more ambiguous "lady friend" – a companion of the female gender who is possibly less than a girlfriend but potentially more than a friend. That is to say, the relationship is not necessarily platonic, nor is it necessarily an exclusive, serious, committed, or long-term relationship. The term avoids the overt sexual implications that come with referring to a woman as someone's "mistress" or "lover". In that sense, it can often be a euphemism. The term can also sometimes be employed when someone simply does not know the exact status of a woman that a man has been associating with. For instance, tabloid headlines often note that a celebrity has been seen with a new "lady friend". "Lady friend" may also be used to signify a romantic relationship with an older woman, when the term "girl" as in "girlfriend" may be deemed age-inappropriate.

== See also ==
- Domestic partnership
- Girlfriend experience

== Bibliography ==
- Sociocultural Perspectives on Language Change in Diaspora David R. Andrews (1998); John Benjamins Publishing Company, ISBN 90-272-1835-8.
- The Handbook of Language and Gender By Janet Holmes, Miriam Meyerhoff (2003); Blackwell Publishing, ISBN 0-631-22502-1.
- In Your Face: Stories from the Lives of Queer Youth Mary L. Gray (1999); Haworth Press, ISBN 0-7890-0076-8.
- Defining Language: A Local Grammar of Definition Sentences Geoff Barnbrook (2002); John Benjamins Publishing Company, ISBN 1-58811-298-5.
- How Not To Say What You Mean: A Dictionary of Euphemisms R. W. Holder (2002); Oxford University Press, ISBN 0-19-860402-5.
