= The Knack =

American band

- The Knack in 1978. From left to right: Gary, Fieger, Niles, Averre

Background information
- Origin: Los Angeles, California, U.S.
- Genres: Power pop; new wave
- Years active: 1978–1982; 1986–1992; 1994; 1996; 1998–2008
- Labels: Capitol; Charisma
- Past members: Berton Averre; Doug Fieger; Bruce Gary; Prescott Niles; Stephen 'Mac' McNally; Pat Torpey; Billy Ward; Terry Bozzio; David Henderson; Phil Jost
- Website: theknack.com

The Knack was an American power pop band formed in Los Angeles, California, in 1978 by Doug Fieger (lead vocals, rhythm guitar), Berton Averre (lead guitar, backing vocals), Prescott Niles (bass) and Bruce Gary (drums). Spearheaded by the success of their debut single "My Sharona", their first album, Get the Knack (1979), reached number-one in several countries. However, their next two albums, ...But The Little Girls Understand (1980) and Round Trip (1981), were less successful, leading the band to disband in 1982.

The band reunited in 1986 and released their fourth album, Serious Fun, in 1991, before breaking up again the following year. After a brief reunion in 1994, the Knack reunited a final time in 1996, recording two more albums, Zoom (1998) and Normal as the Next Guy (2001). Following Fieger's death in 2010, the Knack permanently disbanded. Their final studio album, Rock & Roll Is Good for You: The Fieger/Averre Demos was released in 2012.

== History ==
=== Founding (1977–1978) ===
Singer Doug Fieger was a native of Oak Park, Michigan, a northern suburb of Detroit, Michigan, and grew up in the 9 Mile/Greenfield area. The brother of attorney Geoffrey Fieger (later known for representing Jack Kevorkian in a series of assisted suicide cases), Fieger had previously played in an eclectic rock band called Sky as well as the Sunset Bombers. Although Sky had received a modest amount of acclaim, including being produced by Rolling Stones producer Jimmy Miller, the band broke up without having any chart success. As a result, Fieger made the decision to move to Los Angeles and start another band.

Shortly after arriving in L.A., Fieger met Berton Averre (lead guitar, backing vocals and keyboards), and the two started a songwriting partnership. Fieger had also known Bruce Gary (drums) for years before forming the Knack in 1978 with Prescott Niles (bass). Niles was the last to join, a week before the band's first show in June 1978. In the meantime, Fieger had been doubling on bass on a series of demos that the group had shopped to several record labels, all of which were rejected. Some of these songs later made up the band's debut album Get the Knack, and included "Good Girls Don't".

=== Get the Knack ===
Within months of their live debut, popular club gigs on the Sunset Strip, as well as guest jams with musicians such as Bruce Springsteen, Tom Petty and Ray Manzarek, led to the band being the subject of a record label bidding war. The band was pursued by ten record labels, but decided on Capitol Records; at the time, the Knack was given the largest signing sum in the label's history. A&R executives Bruce Garfield and Bruce Ravid are credited with signing the band.

The band's debut album, Get the Knack, was one of the year's best-selling albums, holding the number one spot on Billboard magazine's album chart for five consecutive weeks and selling two million copies in the United States. The lead single, "My Sharona", was a No. 1 hit in the US, and became the number-one song of 1979. Fieger wrote the song about the woman who would later become his girlfriend, Sharona Alperin.The follow-up single "Good Girls Don't" peaked at No. 11 in the US, and reached No. 1 in Canada.

However, the band's rise to the top of the charts also precipitated a backlash. Capitol's packaging of Get the Knack included a perceived cover likeness to Meet the Beatles! with the record's center label being the same design and style as the Beatles' early 1960s LPs. Coupled with the band's "retro" 1960s look and pop/rock sound, the company's stylings led detractors to accuse them of being Beatles rip-offs, which the band and their record company denied. Fieger acknowledged the band's likeness to the Beatles, claiming that it was their intention to present the Knack as a replica of the British Invasion. He went on to mention how fans of the Knack had not been able to experience the times of the 1960s, and that it was wrong to deny them the privilege of experiencing something similar. Critics fought back, claiming the band was imposing inadequate memories of the 1960s on those who didn't know better. Soon, as Get the Knack became more popular, the band was met with hostility from other artists who felt the intense marketing of the band was invalidating their own efforts of invoking the 1960 sound. This perception, and the perception that the object of some of the Knack's songs were teenaged girls (subsequently acknowledged when the band was years older), quickly led to a "Knuke the Knack" campaign led by San Francisco artist Hugh Brown.

=== The follow-up albums (1980–1981) ===
The Knack quickly recorded a follow-up album ...But the Little Girls Understand, which was released in early 1980. Though the album went gold in the US and Japan, and platinum in Canada, it didn't meet with the same level of commercial success as their debut. Fieger claimed in later interviews that all of the tracks for Get the Knack and ...But the Little Girls Understand were written before the first LP was recorded and were intended to be put out as a double album. Additionally, the lead single "Baby Talks Dirty" only briefly made the US Top 40, stalling at No. 38 (but reaching No. 13 in Canada); follow-up single "Can't Put a Price on Love" missed the top 40 altogether, peaking at No. 62.

After nearly a year of touring in the US, Canada, Europe, New Zealand, Australia, and Japan, starting in April 1980 the band took a year off because of exhaustion and "internal dissent". They reconvened in the summer of 1981 to record their third album, Round Trip. However, the record (released in October 1981) was a commercial disappointment, only reaching No. 93 on the Billboard chart, selling 150,000 copies. As well, the lead single "Pay the Devil (Ooo, Baby, Ooo)" peaked at No. 67 on the Billboard Hot 100. The group made several concert appearances during 1981 to promote Round Trip. Keyboardist Phil Jost was brought into the lineup at this time to enable the band to duplicate the more heavily layered sound of their new release.

With the Knack experiencing rapidly diminishing chart success, and mounting critical backlash against them, Fieger left amidst internal squabbles on December 31, 1981, just months after the release of Round Trip. Averre, Niles, and Gary briefly continued with former Roadmaster vocalist Stephen 'Mac' McNally as "The Game" after the Knack's initial break up. By mid-1982, the Knack had split up while Fieger formed a new band, "Doug Fieger's Taking Chances".

=== Return of the Knack and final album (1986–2010) ===
The Knack reunited in November 1986, to play a benefit for Michele Myers, who had been the first person to book the band for a show in 1978. They continued to play club gigs for the next several years.

In July 1989 Billy Ward replaced Bruce Gary as the band's drummer (after a brief interim by Pat Torpey of Mr. Big). In 1990, the Knack signed with Charisma Records and recorded the album Serious Fun which was released in February 1991. Lead single "Rocket O' Love" was a top 10 hit on US AOR stations (and a top 30 hit in Canada). To promote the song, they released a music video loaded with visual innuendo thematic to the song. Charisma collapsed after the death of the label's founder, Tony Stratton Smith, and the group broke up again in 1992.

In 1994, with Ward back on drums, the band reunited to make some concert appearances to capitalize on the new popularity of "My Sharona" after its appearance in the movie Reality Bites. During that time, they appeared on The Tonight Show with Jay Leno and performed "My Sharona" for the first time ever on network television.

In 1996 all four original band members, including Bruce Gary, reunited in the studio one last time to record a track for a multi-artist compilation album, saluting the British band Badfinger (where the band covered Badfinger's hit "No Matter What").

The Knack continued as a touring and recording act through the late 1990s and into the 2000s. The four original members, with special guest Irvin "Magic" Kramer (keyboards, guitar), reunited for a one/off at The Roxy in Hollywood, California on April 28th, 1988. But Terry Bozzio took over as drummer for 1998's Zoom then David Henderson (as "Holmes Jones") took over on drums for 2001's Normal as the Next Guy and Live at the Rock N Roll Funhouse albums. Drummer Pat Torpey returned to take over for Henderson and played with the group until Fieger's death in 2010.

In 2005 the Knack made an appearance on the TV program Hit Me, Baby, One More Time, performing "My Sharona" and Jet's "Are You Gonna Be My Girl".

In 2006 Doug Fieger and Berton Averre filed a lawsuit against the hip hop music group Run–D.M.C. for copyright infringement. The lawsuit alleges that the defining guitar riff from "My Sharona" was used without permission in the Run-D.M.C. track "It's Tricky" from their 1986 album Raising Hell.

In 2006 during a performance in Las Vegas, Fieger became disoriented, developing a dull headache, and grasping for the words to the songs that he had written and performed for years. Diagnosed with two brain tumors, Fieger underwent surgery and radiosurgery and returned to performing. However, he still continued to battle brain and lung cancer until his death on February 14, 2010, in Woodland Hills, California, at the age of 57, effectively bringing the band to an end.

In 2026, bassist Prescott Niles began performing Knack–centered concerts at small venues across the United States. Though billed as "Prescott Niles' The Knack", management for The Knack elaborated that the project is not a continuation of the band, while expressing their support.

== Outside the Knack ==
In the interim between the Knack's break-up and 1986 reunion, Doug Fieger worked as a guest vocalist on a few tracks by Was (Not Was). Fieger had grown up with band member Don Was; Was later produced the Knack's album Serious Fun. Fieger released his debut solo album, First Things First, in 1999. He also appeared as a solo artist in the Countdown Spectacular 2 concert series in Australia between late-August and early-September 2007. He sang the Knack favorite "My Sharona" only. Fieger's second solo album, Hankerings, was released posthumously in 2010. In 1985, Averre, Niles, and Gary formed The Front with actor Steven Bauer as lead vocalist.

Bruce Gary became a producer (archive recordings of Jimi Hendrix and new recordings of The Ventures) and a sideman performing live and on studio sessions with a wide range of artists. Gary died from lymphoma on August 22, 2006, at the age of 55.

== Members ==
- Berton Averre - lead guitar, backing vocals, keyboards (1978–1982, 1986–1992, 1994, 1996, 1998–2008)
- Prescott Niles - bass (1978–1982, 1986–1992, 1994, 1996, 1998–2008)
- Doug Fieger - lead vocals, rhythm guitar (1978–1981, 1986–1992, 1994, 1996, 1998–2008; died 2010)
- Bruce Gary - drums (1978–1982, 1986–1989, 1996; died 2006)
- Phil Jost - keyboards (1981)
- Stephen 'Mac' McNally - lead vocals (1982)
- Irvin Magic Kramer - keyboards, guitar (1988)
- Pat Torpey - drums (1989, 2001–2008; died 2018)
- Billy Ward - drums (1989–1992, 1994)
- Terry Bozzio - drums (1998–2001)
- David Henderson ("Holmes Jones") - drums (2001)

== Discography ==
- Get the Knack (1979)
- ...But the Little Girls Understand (1980)
- Round Trip (1981)
- Serious Fun (1991)
- Zoom (1998)
- Normal as the Next Guy (2001)
- Rock & Roll Is Good for You: The Fieger/Averre Demos (2012)
