= Sunset Records =

American record label (1965–1970); imprint of Liberty Records

- Parent company: Liberty Records
- Founded: 1965
- Founder: Liberty Records
- Defunct: 1970
- Status: Defunct

Sunset Records was a record label started in 1965 as the budget album subsidiary of Liberty Records to reissue and issue material originally recorded for Liberty, Imperial, Minit and other Liberty subsidiaries as well as leased material from other entities.

== History ==
Sunset Records was started by Liberty Records in 1965 as a budget line, with Ed Barsky at the helm. The label was named for the location of Liberty's corporate offices, and possibly a sly acknowledgement that the material was towards the end of its economic usefulness to Liberty.

The Sunset label was introduced to the United Kingdom in February, 1968, which also included licensing from Hanna-Barbera. Later in 1968, Liberty was acquired by Transamerica Corporation, an insurance company who then merged Liberty with its United Artists Records subsidiary. Sunset was retained as the budget imprint for the combined operation, and United Artist's brands Tale Spinners, True Action and UnArt subsequently appeared as Sunset releases, all under the direction of Ed Barsky.

The label was discontinued in early 1970 in the United States, but remained in operation in the United Kingdom until 1978.

The Sunset Records catalog is currently owned by the Capitol Records subsidiary of the Universal Music Group.

== Content ==
Material released on the Sunset label consisted primarily of tracks that had been previously included on other, full priced albums on labels under the control of Liberty. Sunset also released material leased from other companies, such as Vee-Jay Records. Rarely were any charting hits included, although songs appearing at the lower reaches of the charts might be incorporated.

Sunset albums generally consist of a wide diversity of a given artist's output, which could disappoint a buyer looking for the artist's current sound, but is of value to collectors because some of the material is otherwise very difficult to locate. Liberty owner Simon Waronker considered it a "way to keep money flowing in" because there were no production costs associated with the releases, it was material already in the vaults.

In keeping with industry practice regarding budget labels, Sunset albums lacked paper inner sleeves and were pressed on lower-quality material, usually polystyrene. However, the album covers were usually full cover portraits of the artist, and liner notes were included on the back.

== Labels ==
Both United States pressings and United Kingdom pressings consisted of a black label with silver printing, and the Sunset logo on the left side. However, United States pressings are colored light blue on the far left side, while the United Kingdom product contains an orange area instead. The logo was a "modernistic" sun setting in rainbow-colored clouds, all depicted in undulating lines.

== Artists ==
Notable artists whose material appears on Sunset include:

- Nancy Ames
- Frankie Avalon
- Chet Baker
- Charlie Barnet
- Buddy Bregman
- Walter Brennan
- Bud & Travis
- Johnny Burnette
- Jerry Butler
- Al Caiola
- Canned Heat
- Vicki Carr
- Carter Family
- Mel Carter
- Jeff Chandler
- Cher
- The Chipmunks
- Dee Clark
- Petula Clark
- Eddie Cochran
- Eddie Condon
- Vic Dana
- Damita Jo DeBlanc
- Martin Denny
- Fats Domino
- Nelson Eddy
- Duke Ellington
- Betty Everett
- Ferrante & Teicher
- The Fleetwoods
- Snuff Garrett
- Georgia Gibbs
- Bobby Goldsboro
- Eddie Harris
- Woody Herman
- Eddie Heywood, Jr.
- Al Hibbler
- Billie Holiday
- Dick Hyman
- Isley Brothers
- Burl Ives
- Jan and Dean
- Jay and the Americans
- Gordon Jenkins
- Ray Kinney
- Gary Lewis & the Playboys
- Joe Loco
- Julie London
- Nellie Lutcher
- Gloria Lynne
- Henry Mancini
- Johnny Mann
- Gene McDaniels
- Jimmy McGriff
- Rod McKuen
- Russ Morgan
- Gerry Mulligan
- Billy Mure
- Ozzie Nelson
- Ricky Nelson
- Sandy Nelson
- Willie Nelson
- Minnie Pearl
- Johnnie Ray
- Jimmy Reed
- Del Reeves
- Nelson Riddle
- Johnny Rivers
- Bud Shank
- Del Shannon
- Charlie Shavers
- Felix Slatkin
- The Standells
- Kay Starr
- Billy Strange
- Harry Sukman
- The T-Bones
- Ike & Tina Turner
- Stanley Turrentine
- Bobby Vee
- The Bonzo Dog Band
- The Ventures
- Jerry Wallace
- Slim Whitman
- Tex Williams
- Bob Wills
- Flip Wilson
- Lester Young
- Timi Yuro
- Si Zentner

== See also ==
- List of record labels
