= Get the Knack =

Studio album by The Knack
- Released: June 1, 1979
- Recorded: April 1979
- Studio: The Record Plant (New York)
- Genres: Power pop; new wave
- Length: 40:58
- Label: Capitol Records
- Producer: Mike Chapman

The Knack chronology
Get the Knack (1979)	...But the Little Girls Understand (1980)

Singles from Get the Knack
- 1. "My Sharona" Released: June 18, 1979; 2. "Good Girls Don't" Released: August 1979

Get the Knack is the debut studio album by American power pop band The Knack, released in June 1979. At the time, the album was one of the most successful debuts in history, selling over 1,000,000 copies in less than 2 months and spending 5 weeks at #1 on the Billboard 200 album chart.

The lead single from the album, "My Sharona", was number one on the Billboard Hot 100 for 6 weeks and #1 on Billboard's Top Pop Singles of 1979 year-end chart. The follow-up single, "Good Girls Don't", reached #11 on the Hot 100 and followed "My Sharona" to number one on the Canadian Singles Chart. In Billboard magazine's year-end charts, Get the Knack ranked at #16 for 1979, and #72 for 1980.

== Background ==
The Knack formed in L.A. in May 1978, and after shopping their demo tape to various record labels without success, the band began playing the local club circuit beginning in June, playing over 50 gigs in the next six months. The band quickly gained a following as word of mouth spread about their energetic shows, and musicians such as Ray Manzarek, Tom Petty, and Bruce Springsteen came to their shows and joined the group on stage. By December, 13 record labels, including some that previously rejected them, were offering recording contracts, and the group signed with Capitol Records in January 1979.

== Recording ==
Get the Knack was recorded in just two weeks at a cost of only $18,000, an extremely quick and inexpensive recording at a time when many established artists were spending months and several hundred thousand dollars to record an album. The album was produced by Mike Chapman, who had written hits for Sweet in the early 1970s and most recently produced Blondie's breakout album Parallel Lines.

== Release and reception ==
Professional ratings
Review scores
Source	Rating
AllMusic	4.5/5 stars
The Rolling Stone Album Guide	3/5 stars
Smash Hits	5/10
The Village Voice	B−

Get the Knack was released in June 1979 and became an immediate success, thanks in part to an intense promotional campaign by Capitol Records. The Knack's image was largely influenced by the Beatles. The album cover imitates the Beatles' first Capitol LP, Meet the Beatles!, and the back cover photo depicts a scene from the Beatles' film A Hard Day's Night. To complete the Beatles' imagery, the 1960s Capitol rainbow label adorned the LP, a detail the band had written into its contract. The album obtained a gold certification from the RIAA in just 13 days, becoming Capitol Records' fastest-selling debut LP since Meet the Beatles! in 1964. In August, the album reached #1 on the Billboard 200, where it remained for 5 weeks, and was certified platinum by the RIAA for 1,000,000 copies sold. The lead single, "My Sharona", also met with immediate success, becoming Capitol's fastest-selling debut single since the Beatles' "I Want to Hold Your Hand" and staying at #1 on the Billboard Hot 100 for 6 weeks.

A backlash against the Knack's overnight success formed among critics who found the band's image too contrived and their attitude too brash. San Francisco conceptual artist Hugh Brown, who had designed the Clash's Give 'Em Enough Rope album cover, started a "Knuke the Knack" campaign complete with T-shirts, buttons, and bumper stickers. Some music writers began to criticize the band for what they perceived as arrogance, hype, and a misogynist attitude expressed in their songs. The band's refusal to do interviews was also viewed negatively by the music press. One entertainment weekly, Scene magazine, refused to publish a review of the Knack's concert in Cleveland due to what it called "attempts at censorship" by the band's management.

Robert Christgau of The Village Voice was critical of the album's misogynistic themes and remarked that if the Knack "felt this way about girls when they were unknowns, I shudder to think how they're reacting to groupies." However, Christgau countered critics who had dismissed the band on "purely technical terms", arguing that "if they're less engaging musically than, say, the Scruffs, they have a lot more pop and power going for them than, say, the Real Kids." Billboard critic Dick Nusser was particularly complimentary of tracks such as "Let Me Out", "Maybe Tonight" and "That's What the Little Girls Do", while noting that the pleading song "Oh Tara" indicates that the Knack "aren't strict girl haters."

== Legacy ==
In a retrospective review, AllMusic critic Chris Woodstra wrote that the Knack's attempt to "update the Beatles sound for the new wave era" was "a good idea that was well executed", describing Get the Knack as "at once sleazy, sexist, hook-filled, and endlessly catchy – above all, it's a guilty pleasure and an exercise in simple fun." Trouser Press noted the negative portrayal of the female protagonists of certain songs and singled out "Maybe Tonight" as "bottom-of-the-barrel sap", but praised "My Sharona", "Let Me Out" and "Frustrated" as "tight guitar pop." In 2016, Paste ranked Get the Knack at number 39 on its list of the 50 best new wave albums. Nirvana frontman Kurt Cobain listed Get the Knack as one of his 50 favorite recordings.

== Re-issues ==
When the album was initially released on CD in 1989, the song "(She's So) Selfish" had vocals different from the original release, with lyrics like "coming from the quaalude scene" changed to "...lame'o scene". Capitol Records used a censored, alternate version of the track which was requested in certain countries.

The album was re-issued on CD in 2002 as a remastered version true to the original vinyl release. This version included bonus demos of "My Sharona" and "That's What the Little Girls Do", as well as a rehearsal take of "Maybe Tonight". It also included a cover of Bruce Springsteen's Darkness on the Edge of Town outtake "Don't Look Back", which the Knack recorded in 1979 but was left off the Get the Knack LP, and a cover of Nick Lowe's "I Knew the Bride". A subsequent CD re-issue was remastered by Iconoclassic Records in 2011. Unlike the previous remaster, the 2011 release contains no dynamic range compression.

In April 2017, Mobile Fidelity Sound Lab released an audiophile version of the album on hybrid SACD. This release, like the 2002 Capitol and 2011 Iconoclassic versions, utilizes the original, un-censored mixes.

== Track listing ==
Side one
No.	Title	Writer(s)	Length
1.	"Let Me Out"	Doug Fieger, Berton Averre	2:20
2.	"Your Number or Your Name"	Fieger, Averre	2:57
3.	"Oh Tara"	Fieger	3:04
4.	"(She's So) Selfish"	Fieger, Averre	4:30
5.	"Maybe Tonight"	Fieger	4:00
6.	"Good Girls Don't"	Fieger	3:07

Side two
No.	Title	Writer(s)	Length
7.	"My Sharona"	Fieger, Averre	4:52
8.	"Heartbeat"	Bob Montgomery, Norman Petty	2:11
9.	"Siamese Twins (The Monkey and Me)"	Fieger, Averre	3:25
10.	"Lucinda"	Fieger, Averre	4:00
11.	"That's What the Little Girls Do"	Fieger	2:41
12.	"Frustrated"	Fieger, Averre	3:51
Total length:			40:58

== Personnel ==
Taken from the Get The Knack liner notes, and Sound on Sound.

The Knack

- Doug Fieger – lead and backing vocals, rhythm guitar, harmonica on "Good Girls Don't"
- Berton Averre – lead guitar, backing vocals
- Prescott Niles – bass, backing vocals on "My Sharona"
- Bruce Gary – drums, backing vocals on "My Sharona"

Additional personnel

- Mike Chapman – production
- David Tickle – recording, backing vocals on "My Sharona"
- Peter Coleman – recording

== Charts ==
=== Weekly charts ===
Chart (1979–80)	Peak position
Australian Albums (Kent Music Report)	1
Canada Top Albums/CDs (RPM)	1
Dutch Albums (Album Top 100)	36
German Albums (Offizielle Top 100)	24
New Zealand Albums (RMNZ)	2
Swedish Albums (Sverigetopplistan)	39
UK Albums (Official Charts)	65
US Billboard 200	1

=== Year-end charts ===
Chart (1979)	Position
New Zealand Albums (RMNZ)	34
Billboard Magazine (USA)	16

== Certifications ==
Region	Certification	Certified units/sales
Australia (ARIA)	Gold	20,000^{^}
Canada (Music Canada)	4× Platinum	400,000^{^}
New Zealand (RMNZ)	Gold	7,500^{^}
United States (RIAA)	2× Platinum	2,000,000^{^}
^{^} Shipments figures based on certification alone.
