= My Sharona =

1979 single by the Knack

- Standard US picture sleeve, featuring the song's inspiration – Sharona Alperin

Single by the Knack

from the album Get the Knack
- B-side: "Let Me Out"
- Released: June 18, 1979
- Recorded: April 1979
- Genre: Power pop; new wave; garage rock
- Length: 3:58 (single edit); 4:52 (album version)
- Label: Capitol
- Songwriters: Doug Fieger; Berton Averre
- Producer: Mike Chapman

The Knack singles chronology
| "My Sharona" (1979) | "Good Girls Don't" (1979) |

Music video
- The Knack – "My Sharona" on YouTube

"My Sharona" (/ʃəˈroʊnə/) is the debut single by American power pop band the Knack. The song was written by Berton Averre and Doug Fieger, and it was released in June 1979 by Capitol Records, from their debut album, Get the Knack (1979). It reached number one on both the US Cash Box Top 100 and Billboard Hot 100 charts, where it remained for six weeks, and was number one on Billboard's 1979 Top Pop Singles year-end chart.

It was certified gold by the Recording Industry Association of America, representing 1,000,000 copies sold, and was Capitol Records' fastest gold status debut single since the Beatles' "I Want to Hold Your Hand" in 1964. It has since gone on to sell more than 10 million copies as of 2010, becoming one of the best-selling singles of all time.

== Inspiration ==
When Doug Fieger was 25 years old, he met 17-year-old Sharona Alperin, who inspired a two-month-long run of songwriting, as well as eventually becoming his girlfriend for the next four years. Fieger recounted that "It was like getting hit in the head with a baseball bat; I fell in love with her instantly. And when that happened, it sparked something and I started writing a lot of songs feverishly in a short amount of time." Fieger and Averre worked out the structure and melody of the song. Averre was originally averse to using Alperin's name in the song, but Fieger wanted it to be a direct expression of his feelings; Averre ultimately relented. Fieger claimed that "My Sharona" was written in 15 minutes; moreover, it was purportedly mixed in an additional 15 minutes after the recording of the song was made in a single take (not including background vocals).

Fieger and Alperin were engaged at one point but never married. She went on to have a successful career as a realtor in Los Angeles. In a 2005 interview, Fieger said they remained "great friends". Additionally, Alperin visited Fieger regularly during the final months of his life when he was dying of cancer.

== Music and lyrics ==
The music of the song echoes many elements of songs from the 1960s. According to a Trouser Press reviewer, the song's main melodic hook is "an inversion of the signature riff" from "Gimme Some Lovin'", a 1966 song by the Spencer Davis Group. Fieger acknowledged that the song's tom-tom drum rhythm is "just a rewrite" of "Going to a Go-Go", a song from Smokey Robinson and the Miracles from 1965. Drummer Bruce Gary has stated that although he did not particularly like the song when Fieger introduced it to the band, he came up with the stuttering beat for the song similar to a surf stomp, with just tom-tom and snare. He also decided to incorporate a flam, in which two drum strokes are staggered, creating a fuller sound, which Gary considered to be crucial to the song's success.

In an interview with The Washington Post, Fieger claimed that the song was written from the perspective of a 14-year-old boy.

The song's stuttering vocal effect of the repeated "muh muh muh my Sharona" phrase is reminiscent of Roger Daltrey's vocals in the 1965 song "My Generation" by the Who.

== Music video ==
The music video features the band performing the song in a white room. Another music video features clips from the film Reality Bites, concert footage and Another Lousy Day in Paradise music video.

== Artwork ==
In addition to being the inspiration for the song, Sharona Alperin posed for the single's picture sleeve holding a copy of the Knack's debut studio album Get the Knack.

== Reception ==
Produced by Mike Chapman, the song's clean sound was reminiscent of the sound of the 1960s British Invasion. Billboard Magazine described "My Sharona" as "an energetic rocker with a subtle melody line." Dick Nusser of Billboard remarked on the song's "catchy, deliberately awkward, stop-go drum and guitar breaks", its "quirky lyrics" and "suggestive tone", and that the song will "make you ready, willing and able to hum the refrain at the right moment." Cash Box said it begins with "slamming drums and rock steady, building guitar work." In the Pazz & Jop 1979 Critic's Poll, "My Sharona" and Fleetwood Mac's "Tusk" were tied for sixth place in the list of top singles of the year.

Chris Woodstra of AllMusic has subsequently referred to the song as an "unforgettable hit." The New Rolling Stone Album Guide claimed that the song "was a hit for a good reason. The beat is urgent, the chorus calls out for drunken shouting along and the guitar solo is a firecracker flash."

== Legacy ==
"My Sharona" has retrospectively been viewed as a symbol for the fall of the 1970s' disco and the rise of the 1980s' new wave. The New York Times called the song "an emblem of the new wave era in rock and a prime example of the brevity of pop fame."

My Sharona was covered by American musical parody artist "Weird Al" Yankovic as his debut single My Bologna (1979). The song was later re-recorded for his unnamed debut album (1983) and also features on the 1993 compilation album The Food Album. A "bathroom version" of it was re-released on the box sets Permanent Record: Al in the Box (1994) and Squeeze Box: The Complete Works of "Weird Al" Yankovic (2017).

During the making of Michael Jackson's 1982 Thriller album, producer Quincy Jones aspired to include a rock-and-roll-inspired song in the vein of "My Sharona". Jackson subsequently wrote "Beat It".

In 2008, "My Sharona" was ranked in two Billboard 50th anniversary charts. It ranked 75 on the Billboard Hot 100 All-Time Top Songs and 16 on the Top Billboard Hot 100 Rock Songs.

In 1994, "My Sharona" re-entered the Billboard Hot 100 chart and peaked at number 91, when it was released as part of the Reality Bites soundtrack album. In the film itself, the characters dance to the song at a convenience store. This version was remixed by Dave Jerden and features, among other changes, a much more prominent drum sound. Director Quentin Tarantino wanted to use this song in the 1994 film Pulp Fiction during the film’s rape scene, but the idea was ultimately discounted due to its use in Reality Bites, which had been released that same year.

In 2005, the song gained some attention when it appeared on the playlist of U.S. President George W. Bush's iPod.

"Girl U Want" by Devo, from the album Freedom of Choice, was allegedly inspired by "My Sharona", although Devo's Gerald Casale has denied this.

In 2023, Berton Averre stated that the song continues to generate royalties of between $100,000 and $300,000 for him annually.

The song featured in an episode of the 1990s TV show Eerie, Indiana; the lyrics were repeated over and over by a (seemingly) crazy homeless person and was a major part of the plot.

In 2025, a viral French language advertising campaign developed by Sid Lee for Canadian home improvement retailer Rona used a rewritten version of the song, "Mike chez Rona" ("Mike, at Rona").

== Personnel ==
Taken from the Get The Knack liner notes, and Sound on Sound.

The Knack

- Doug Fieger – lead and backing vocals, rhythm guitar
- Berton Averre – lead guitar, backing vocals
- Prescott Niles – bass guitar, backing vocals
- Bruce Gary – drums, backing vocals

Additional performer

- David Tickle – backing vocals

== Charts ==
=== Weekly charts ===
| Chart (1979–1980) | Peak position |
|---|---|
| Argentina | 8 |
| Australia (Kent Music Report) | 1 |
| Austria (Ö3 Austria Top 40) | 13 |
| Belgium (Ultratop 50 Flanders) | 12 |
| Canada (RPM 100 Singles) | 1 |
| France (SNEP) | 3 |
| Ireland (IRMA) | 14 |
| Italy (Musica e dischi) | 1 |
| Netherlands (Dutch Top 40) | 20 |
| Netherlands (Single Top 100) | 13 |
| New Zealand (Recorded Music NZ) | 3 |
| Switzerland (Schweizer Hitparade) | 7 |
| UK Singles (Official Charts) | 6 |
| US Billboard Hot 100 | 1 |
| US Cash Box Top 100 | 1 |
| West Germany (GfK) | 12 |

| Chart (1994) | Peak position |
|---|---|
| Australia (ARIA) | 72 |
| US Billboard Hot 100 | 91 |
| US Cash Box Top 100 | 88 |

=== Year-end charts ===
Annual chart rankings for "My Sharona"
| Chart (1979) | Position |
|---|---|
| Australia (Kent Music Report) | 11 |
| Canada (RPM) | 3 |
| New Zealand | 24 |
| US Billboard Hot 100 | 1 |

| Chart (1980) | Position |
|---|---|
| Italy (TV Sorrisi e Canzoni) | 10 |

=== All-time charts ===
| Chart (1958–2018) | Position |
|---|---|
| US Billboard Hot 100 | 95 |

== Sales and certifications ==
| Region | Certification | Certified units/sales |
|---|---|---|
| Canada (Music Canada) | Platinum | 150,000^{^} |
| Italy (FIMI) | Gold | 25,000^{‡} |
| United Kingdom (BPI) | Gold | 400,000^{‡} |
| United States (RIAA) | Gold | 1,000,000^{^} |
^{^} Shipments figures based on certification alone.^{‡} Sales+streaming figures based on certification alone.

== Covers, parodies, and samples ==
=== Royal Blood version ===
- The song was covered by British rock duo Royal Blood on the BBC Live Lounge.

=== Parodies ===
- "My Bologna" by "Weird Al" Yankovic – The 1979 song kickstarted Yankovic's career in song parody. The Knack approved of the parody and even had Yankovic inked to a one-off deal with their label, Capitol Records. A re-recorded version appeared on his eponymous début album.
- "Ayatollah" by Chicago radio personality Steve Dahl – The song covered current events related to the Iranian Revolution of 1979. It reached No. 12 on the weekly Musicradio survey of Chicago superstation WLS on February 9, 1980.
- "Pull My Strings" by the Dead Kennedys – The song was performed live only once at the 1980 Bay Area Music Awards in order to criticize BAM Magazine for inviting the Dead Kennedys to the show for the sake of providing, in the magazine's words, "new wave credibility," which the band viewed as an insulting description. In doing so, the song criticizes mainstream pop music practices and "prefabricated superstars" of the late 1970s. Deeming "My Sharona" as an example of supposedly soulless popular music, "Pull My Strings" parodies the chorus by repeating the words "drool, drool, drool, drool, drool, drool... my Payola!"
- "My Scrotum" by Cheech Marin – The song was featured in the 1980 film Cheech & Chong's Next Movie.
- "Nine Coronas" by John Mammoser – Originally recorded in 1987 with release in 1995, and with two follow-up versions ("10 Coronas" in 1996, and "9 Coronas ('99 version')" in 1999) that were showcased on the Dr. Demento radio programs.
- "My Menorah" by American Comedy Network – a Flash parody in 2004 with singing candles.
- In 2020, multiple parodies were performed called "My Corona", referencing the coronavirus outbreak. These included YouTube medical personality Dr. Zubin Damania, and Inbar and Gilor Levi.
  - The Knack band members Berton Averre and Prescott Niles released a video of their own parody, titled "Bye, Corona!"
- In March 2025, Rona released a French-language commercial named "Mike chez Rona" (lit. 'Mike at Rona') – which is a parody both in the lyrics and the title. This commercial have gone viral in Canada, especially in Quebec.

=== Audio samples ===
- American hip-hop group Run–D.M.C. used an unauthorized audio sample from the song in their 1986 hit "It's Tricky". In 2006, Berton Averre and Doug Fieger filed suit against Apple, Run-D.M.C. and others for electronically redistributing the work. The case was settled in 2009.
- British girl group Girls Aloud incorporated parts of the song for the track "No Good Advice".

== "Let Me Out" ==
"Let Me Out"

Song by the Knack

from the album Get the Knack
- B-side: "My Sharona""
- Released: June 11, 1979
- Recorded: April 1979
- Genre: Power pop; new wave
- Length: 2:20
- Label: Capitol
- Songwriters: Doug Fieger; Berton Averre
- Producer: Mike Chapman

The B-side of the "My Sharona" single was "Let Me Out". It was written by Fieger and Averre to fill the band's need for a strong opening track for concerts and later for their Get the Knack album. Averre has stated that the song is "absurdly fast." Drummer Bruce Gary felt that the words of "Let Me Out" helped make the song a perfect opener since the band wanted to "let out", and bassist Prescott Niles noted that, with the song, the band was all of a sudden "out of the box." Gary has also claimed that the song was "me trying to be Buddy Rich in a rock 'n' roll band. It was just full on."

Billboard described "Let Me Out" as "a teen anthem delivered at full throttle" and praised the song's "delightful" harmonies, "slapping" guitars and "perfectly tuned" drumming. Superchunk and The Mountain Goats drummer Jon Wurster commented on the "full force" of Gary's drumming on "Let Me Out." Ira Robbins and Michael Sandlin of Trouser Press described the song as "tight guitar pop." Author John Borack described the song as "a damn fine pop tune." Audio magazine called it a "basher" with "plenty of style." AllMusic critic Mark Deming stated that the live version of "Let Me Out" has "a joyous force nearly any act would envy." Dave Swanson of Ultimate Classic Rock called it "one of the most powerful album openers ever." Classic Rock History critic Skip Anderson called it a "smoking track" and rated it as the Knack's 10th best song.

A 1979 live performance of "Let Me Out" from Carnegie Hall was included on the LaserDisc of Live at Carnegie Hall. The song was included on their compilation album, Premium Gold Collection. A 2012 vinyl EP for Record Store Day includes 1978 live performances of "Let Me Out" and "My Sharona" from Los Angeles and two other songs. The two performances are also included on the live CD of the entire 1978 Los Angeles concert Havin' a Rave-Up.
