= Doug Fieger =

American singer-songwriter

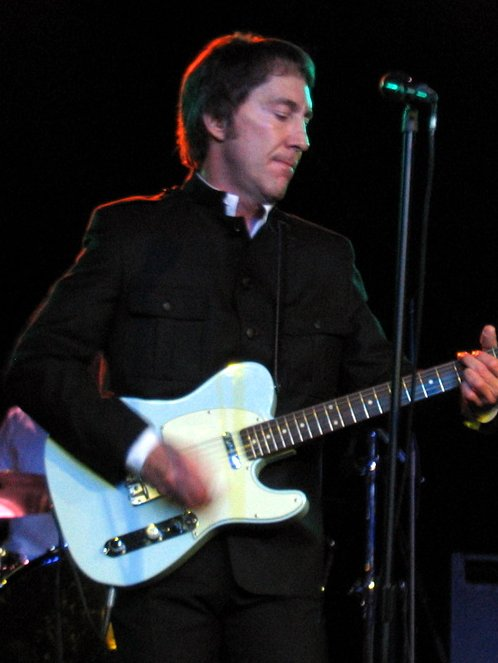
- Fieger in 2005

Background information
- Born: Douglas Lars Fieger; August 20, 1952; Detroit, Michigan, U.S.
- Died: February 14, 2010 (aged 57) Los Angeles, California, U.S.
- Genres: Rock; power pop; new wave
- Occupations: Musician; songwriter
- Instruments: Vocals; guitar; harmonica
- Years active: 1969–2010
- Labels: RCA; Capitol; Rhino; Ariola Records
- Formerly of: The Knack; Sky
- Website: dougfieger.com
- Spouse: Mia
- Partner: Sharona Alperin
- Relatives: Geoffrey Fieger (brother)

Douglas Lars Fieger (August 20, 1952 – February 14, 2010) was an American musician, singer and songwriter. He was the rhythm guitarist and lead vocalist of the rock band the Knack. He co-wrote "My Sharona," the biggest hit song of 1979 in the U.S., with lead guitarist Berton Averre.

== Life and career ==
Fieger was born in Detroit, Michigan, the son of June Beth (née Oberer) and Bernard Julian Fieger. His father was Jewish and his mother was of Norwegian descent. Doug was the younger brother of Detroit attorney Geoffrey Fieger, most famous for representing Jack Kevorkian.

Fieger was raised in Oak Park, Michigan, a northern suburb of Detroit, where he attended Oak Park High School. Before forming the Knack, Fieger played bass and sang lead in the group Sky, which was produced by Jimmy Miller. Sky released two albums on RCA Records: Don't Hold Back 1970 and Sailor's Delight 1971, co-produced by Miller and Andy Johns.

In addition to performing, Fieger produced the Rubber City Rebels' debut album for Capitol Records and an album for the Los Angeles–based band Mystery Pop. Fieger collaborated with the Rebels drummer Brandon Matheson as bandmates in the Sunset Bombers. They released one album on Ariola Records prior to Fieger's formation of the Knack. The Knack played its first show at Hollywood's Whisky a Go Go nightclub on June 1, 1978. In addition, they played other Los Angeles–area nightclubs including the Troubadour in West Hollywood. In 1979 they were signed by Capitol Records.

"My Sharona" spent six straight weeks at No. 1 on Billboard's Hot 100 in 1979. It was the biggest hit of the year. Fifteen years later the track gained renewed interest when it was featured in the film Reality Bites. It was also featured regularly in a Saturday Night Live skit parodying Janet Reno. The follow-up hit to "My Sharona," "Good Girls Don't," stopped a notch short of the Top 10, peaking at No. 11. Their album Get the Knack spent five straight weeks at No. 1. Three million copies were sold in the United States and 6 million sold worldwide.

Fieger released two solo albums. First Things First was released in 1999. Hankerings, a Hank Williams tribute, was released posthumously in 2010.

Additionally, Fieger provided lead vocals on two tracks on Was (Not Was)'s 1983 album Born to Laugh at Tornadoes. Shortly before his death, he provided lead vocals for the track "Dirty Girl" from Bruce Kulick's 2010 album BK3; "Dirty Girl" was named 29th-best song of 2010 by Classic Rock magazine.

As a songwriter, Fieger wrote English lyrics for two songs on the 1987 album Brasil by The Manhattan Transfer, working to music by the Brazilian singer-songwriter Djavan.

== Death ==
Fieger was diagnosed with lung cancer in 2004. After surgery in 2006, he went into remission, but the cancer resurfaced in 2009. His former wife, Mia, contributed to Fieger's care during his illness.

Fieger died at his home in the Los Angeles neighborhood of Woodland Hills on February 14, 2010. He was 57 years old. In addition to his older brother, Geoffrey Fieger, survivors included his younger sister, Beth Falkenstein.

Fieger wrote "My Sharona" for Sharona Alperin, his not-yet girlfriend. Fieger and Alperin dated for four years, but they parted, married other people, and remained friends. Alperin visited him frequently in his final months. "People that meant so much to him in the music industry came to pay their respects to him," she said. "It was really beautiful."
