= Berton Averre =

Musical artist (born 1953)

- Born: Berton Leslie Averre; December 13, 1953 (age 72); Los Angeles, California, U.S.
- Genres: Rock
- Instruments: Guitars; keyboards
- Label: Capitol

Berton Leslie Averre (born December 13, 1953) is an American guitarist, born in Van Nuys. He was the lead guitarist and one of the founders of the band The Knack. That group had a No. 6 UK / No. 1 US hit with "My Sharona", which sold 10 million copies in the US. Averre is also a vocal arranger, and has toured with Robby Krieger, Bette Midler, The Cowsills and Sarah Brightman.

Averre's mother was Jewish, and his father converted to Judaism.

In the 1990s, he turned his creative energies towards the theater and developed a screenplay with Tom Schulman, screenwriter of Dead Poets Society and What About Bob?. In 1993, he joined the Lehman Engel Musical Theatre Workshop in Los Angeles, where he met Rob Meurer. As a duo with Averre as composer, Meurer as lyricist, and both as book writers, they have written three musical comedies. The first, The Party's Over, received productions in Chicago and La Mirada. The second, Jungle Man!, has had two hit productions at Stage One in Wichita, in 2000 and 2002. The third, Robin Hood: The Untold Story, was the hit of the ASCAP/Disney Workshop in 2001, and has been seen in Los Angeles, Chicago, and Long Beach.

Averre and Meurer have written two more shows in collaboration with playwright Mark Saltzman. Setup & Punch premiered in the summer of 2009 at The Blank Theater in Hollywood, and received a nomination by L.A. Weekly for Best New Musical. The show featured in a public staged reading on October 13, 2010 at the York Theater in New York. The trio's other show, the musical Vrooom!, had readings in New York in early 2011.
