= Laugharne Township (electoral ward) =

Electoral ward in Carmarthenshire, Wales

Coordinates: 51.770°N 4.537°W

Laugharne Township (Welsh: Lacharn) is an electoral ward for Carmarthenshire County Council in Carmarthenshire, Wales. It is represented by one county councillor.

As well as the town of Laugharne, the ward covers the neighbouring communities of Eglwyscummin, Llanddowror and Pendine. It includes the villages and settlements of Broadway, Cross Inn, Halfpenny Furze, Llandawke, Llanddowror, Llanmiloe, Llansadwrnen, Marros, Pendine, Plashett and Red Roses. The usual population of this ward at the 2011 census was 2,851.

A 2019 boundary review by the Local Government Boundary Commission for Wales recommended the name of the ward be changed to 'Laugharne' with the Welsh name 'Lacharn' (though Laugharne Township Community Council preferred 'Talacharn'). It recommended no changes to the ward boundaries. The county council and news outlets continued to use the name Laugharne Township when reporting the 2022 Carmarthenshire County Council election results - though no election took place in Laugharne because there was only one candidate.

== Representation ==
Laugharne Township has been an electoral ward to Carmarthenshire County Council since 1995, represented by one county councillor. The ward has been represented by Independent councillors from the outset: Cyril Roberts from 1995 and Jane Tremlett since 2004. Tremlett became leader of the Independent group on the county council and cabinet member for social care and health.
