= List of public art in Carmarthenshire =

Map of Wales with Carmarthenshire highlighted

This is a list of public art in Carmarthenshire, Wales. This list applies only to works of public art on permanent display in an outdoor public space and does not, for example, include artworks in museums.

== Ammanford ==
Image	Title / subject	Location and coordinates	Date	Artist / designer	Type	Material	Dimensions	Designation	Wikidata	Notes
	Gorsedd stones	Ammanford	1970		Stone circle	Stone				Erected to mark the 1970 National Eisteddfod of Wales
	Mine worker's memorial	Quay Street, Ammanford	2006	Howard Boycott	Abstract sculpture	Slate and sandstone				
	Twrch Trwyth	Ammanford	2008	Tony Woodman	Sculpture group	Steel				

== Burry Port ==
Image	Title / subject	Location and coordinates	Date	Artist / designer	Type	Material	Dimensions	Designation	Wikidata	Notes
	Amelia Earhart monument	Stepney Road, Burry Port	1930		Obelisk on pedestal	Stone		Grade II	Q29504837	
	War memorial	Memorial Gardens, Burry Port	2001		Cross on tapered pedestal	Stone	1.3m high			
	Amelia Earhart Commemoration Stone	Quayside, Burry Port			Inscised stone & plaque					

== Carmarthen ==
Image	Title / subject	Location and coordinates	Date	Artist / designer	Type	Material	Dimensions	Designation	Wikidata	Notes
More images	The Picton Monument	Picton Terrace, Carmarthen	1847-49, restored 1988	F E H Fowler & J L Collard	Obelisk on pedestal	Stone	25m high	Grade II	Q29488272	
More images	William Nott, 1782-1845.	Nott Square, Carmarthen	1851	Edward Davis	Statue on pedestal	Bronze and granite	4.5m high	Grade II*		Statue cast from captured cannon
More images	Royal Welch Fusillers / Crimean War memorial	Lammas Street, Carmarthen	1858	Edward Richardson	Obelisk on square plinth	Portland stone	10m high	Grade II	Q29488247	
More images	Boer War memorial	Guildhall Square, Carmarthen	1906		Statue on pedestal	Stone and red granite				
	Carmarthen County war memorial	Priory Street, Carmarthen	1924	Goscombe John	Statue on pedestal and stepped plinth	Bronze and Portland stone	4.5m high			
	Gorsedd stones	Carmarthen Park	1973		Stone circle	Stone				Erected to mark the 1974 National Eisteddfod of Wales
	Carmarthen Dragon	Blue Street Roundabout, A4232, Carmarthen	2007	Tony Woodman	Sculpture of a dragon	Stainless steel				Originally made for the Heart of the Dragon Festival in Newcastle Emlyn
	Merlin	Merlin's Walk, Carmarthen	2010	Simon Hedger	Carved sculpture of Merlin	Oak				Sculpture for a shopping development, made from an ancient oak tree
	The Drover	St Catherine's Walk, Carmarthen	2010	Tony Woodman	Tableau of a drover, sheepdog, sheep and goose	Stainless steel				Sculptures for a shopping development, to commemorate the former livestock market

== Carmarthen Bay ==
Image	Title / subject	Location and coordinates	Date	Artist / designer	Type	Material	Dimensions	Designation	Wikidata	Notes
	Memorial to Ray Gravell, 1951–2007.	Myndd-y-garreg, Carmarthen Bay			Inscribed monolith	Stone				

== Eglwyscummin ==
Image	Title / subject	Location and coordinates	Date	Artist / designer	Type	Material	Dimensions	Designation	Wikidata	Notes
More images	War memorial	Pilgrims Way, Marros, Eglwyscummin	1930	Thomas Harries	Trilithon	Limestone with bronze plaques		Grade II	Q29501499	
	World War II memorial	Red Roses			Monolith	Granite				

== Llanboidy ==
Image	Title / subject	Location and coordinates	Date	Artist / designer	Type	Material	Dimensions	Designation	Wikidata	Notes
	Monument to Walter Rice Howell Powell, (1819–1889)	Llanboidy	c.1890	Goscombe John	Statue	White marble		Grade II*	Q17742263	

== Llanelli ==
Image	Title / subject	Location and coordinates	Date	Artist / designer	Type	Material	Dimensions	Designation	Wikidata	Notes
More images	Boer War Memorial	Town Hall Gardens, Llanelli	1905	Francis William Doyle Jones	Statue on a pedestal and plinth	Bronze statue, granite pedestal and plinth		Grade II	Q29490306	
More images	Welsh Regiment World War I memorial	St Ellyw's Church, Llanelli	c. 1920	M.L Edwards (Mason)	Celtic cross	Granite		Grade II	Q29490240	
More images	War memorial	Town Hall Gardens, Llanelli	1923	Goscombe John	Relief panel and cenotaph	Bronze sculpture & granite cenotaph		Grade II	Q29490305	
More images	Welsh Regiment World War II memorial	Town Hall Gardens, Llanelli			Cenotaph	Granite				
More images	Post-1945 war memorial	Town Hall Gardens, Llanelli			Cenotaph & plaque	Stone				
	Industrial Symphony / Tinplate Workers	Eastgate, Llanelli	2014	Peter Walker	Sculpture group	Bronze				

== Llandovery ==
Image	Title / subject	Location and coordinates	Date	Artist / designer	Type	Material	Dimensions	Designation	Wikidata	Notes
	Grave of Sir John Gardner Wilkinson, 1797–1875	St Dingat's church, Llandovery			Canopy on four columns, a pedestal and stepped plinth	Stone		Grade II		
	Mail Coach monument	A40 near Cwm Goleu, east of Llandovery	1841	J Bull, John Jones of Llanddarog	Obelisk & fence	Stone & metal		Grade II		
More images	War memorial	Broad Street, Llandovery	1924	R. L. Boulton & Sons (makers)	Statue on pedestal	Bronze and granite		Grade II	Q29505533	
	Drover	Llandovery	1996	Jacqui Burgess	Sculpture	Bronze				
More images	Llywelyn ap Gruffydd Fychan, (c.1341–1401)	Llandovery Castle	2001	Toby Paterson & Gideon Paterson	Statue on pedestal	Stainless steel and stone	4.9m high	Grade II*		

== Llangynog ==
Image	Title / subject	Location and coordinates	Date	Artist / designer	Type	Material	Dimensions	Designation	Wikidata	Notes
More images	War Memorial	Llangynog	1922	Martin L Edwards of Llanelli	Wayside cross	Granite	4.6m high	Grade II	Q26252561	

== Llansadwrn ==
Image	Title / subject	Location and coordinates	Date	Artist / designer	Type	Material	Dimensions	Designation	Wikidata	Notes
	War memorial	St Sadwrn's Churchyard, Llansadwrn	c.1920	J Thomas of Llanelli	Square shaft with cap and plinth	Gray granite	2.5m high	Grade II	Q29499356	
	Memorial to Gwynfor Evans, (1912–2005)	Near Garn Goch hillfort, Llansadwrn		Ieuan Rees	Inscribed monolith	Stone				

== National Botanic Garden of Wales ==
Image	Title / subject	Location and coordinates	Date	Artist / designer	Type	Material	Dimensions	Designation	Wikidata	Notes
	Welsh Black	National Botanic Garden of Wales, Llanarthney	2009	Sally Matthews	Sculpture	Metal with skins and furs				
	Scaladaqua Touda	National Botanic Garden of Wales		William Pye	Fountain	Stone				
	(Punk) Dog Fish	National Botanic Garden of Wales	2010	Deborah Lewis	Abstract sculpture	Steel and objects on a limestone base				
	Pi	National Botanic Garden of Wales		Rawleigh Clay	Abstract sculpture	Wood and metal				
	Water Lily	National Botanic Garden of Wales		Sarah Tombs	Sculpture	Stainless steel				
	Kisses Across the Sea	National Botanic Garden of Wales		Sonja Dawn Flewitt	Sculpture	Framed cast of lips and chins				
	Creative Growth	Stables courtyard, National Botanic Garden of Wales		Pod Claire and others	Mosaic in form of a DNA helix					
	Liminality	National Botanic Garden of Wales		Benjamin Storch	Abstract sculpture	Metal				
	Boar on the Hill	National Botanic Garden of Wales	2012	Michelle Cain & the British Basketmakers Association	Sculpture	Basketwork				
	Inerta	National Botanic Garden of Wales		Georgina Park	Sculpture	Resin				

== Newcastle Emlyn ==
Image	Title / subject	Location and coordinates	Date	Artist / designer	Type	Material	Dimensions	Designation	Wikidata	Notes
	War memorial	Memorial Garden, Newcastle Emlyn	1923, rededicated 1952		Obelisk	Stone	1.8m high			

== Pontyberem ==
Image	Title / subject	Location and coordinates	Date	Artist / designer	Type	Material	Dimensions	Designation	Wikidata	Notes
	1852 Gwendraeth mining disaster	Pontyberem			Inscribed plaque					
