= Waterston =

Village in Pembrokeshire, Wales

Coordinates: 51.72°N 4.98°W

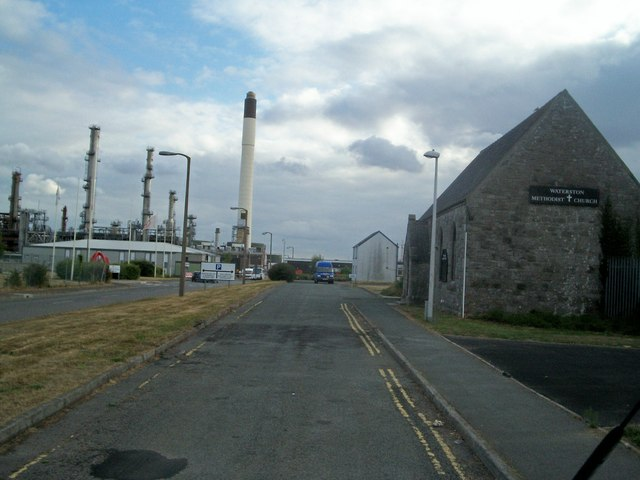
- Waterston Methodist Chapel with Dragon LNG Terminal beyond

- Location within Pembrokeshire
- Population: 335
- OS grid reference: SM939063
- Community: Llanstadwell
- Principal area: Pembrokeshire
- Country: Wales
- Sovereign state: United Kingdom
- Post town: Milford Haven
- Postcode district: SA73
- Dialling code: 01646
- Police: Dyfed-Powys
- Fire: Mid and West Wales
- Ambulance: Welsh
- UK Parliament: Preseli Pembrokeshire
- Senedd Cymru – Welsh Parliament: Preseli Pembrokeshire

Waterston is a village near Milford Haven in Pembrokeshire, Wales, in the community and parish of Llanstadwell. It lies on the B4325 road linking Neyland and Milford Haven.

== Demographics ==
The built-up area had a population of 335 in 2011.

== Features ==
Waterston Wesleyan Methodist chapel was built in 1836. It was rebuilt in the 1880s in Gothic style.

To the northeast of the village is Scoveston Fort, a Grade II listed structure constructed in the 1860s as part of the defences of Pembroke dockyard. It cost £45,462, and was the only one of its kind built.

== Industry ==
Part of the village now lies within the boundaries of the Dragon LNG terminal. Costing about £35 million and extending to 300 acres (120 ha), the plant was built as an oil refinery in 1997. In 2007 it was redeveloped as a LNG storage facility, and taken over by Dragon in 2009. The plant is expected to process between 10 and 20 percent of the UK's gas supply requirement.

A large fire in April 2024 at a car breakers in the village took 7 fire crews to extinguish; nearby residents were evacuated for safety. The cause was found to be accidental, and had been monitored by the close-by Dragon Terminal. There had been a serious fire in January 2024 in the same industrial estate.
