= Scoveston =

Coordinates: 51.723°N 4.986°W

- Location within Pembrokeshire
- OS grid reference: SN625515
- Community: Llanstadwell
- Principal area: Pembrokeshire
- Preserved county: Dyfed
- Country: Wales
- Sovereign state: United Kingdom
- Post town: Milford Haven
- Postcode district: SA73
- Dialling code: 01646
- Police: Dyfed-Powys
- Fire: Mid and West Wales
- Ambulance: Welsh
- UK Parliament: Preseli Pembrokeshire
- Senedd Cymru – Welsh Parliament: Preseli Pembrokeshire

Scoveston is a small village near Llanstadwell and lies between Neyland and Steynton in the Welsh county of Pembrokeshire. Scoveston is a relatively new village, and the first recording of the name was in the 15th century. It is in the parish and community of Llanstadwell.

== History ==
The earliest-known record of Scoveston is from the 15th century, with some other settlements in the immediate area dating from the 16th to 18th centuries. In 1644–45, Thomas Butler of Scoveston was High Sheriff of Pembrokeshire. By 1863, the house had been rebuilt and was occupied by William Rees, another High Sheriff. Scoveston and Upper Scoveston appear on a pre-1850 parish map of Llanstadwell, but were not mentioned in 19th century gazetteers.

Richard Fenton, in his 1811 Pembrokeshire tour, noted the mansion at Scoveston as being a venerable building transmuted into a farm-house, and having been owned by the Mordaunt family, one which was poorly documented.

Upper Scoveston (also referred to as Scoveston Park or Scoveston Manor) was noted by the 1911 Royal Commission as including a boathouse, possible isolated geometric copses, sundial, well, walled garden and lake.

On modern maps, the name is applied to the road passing through the settlement, as well as Upper Scoveston, Lower Scoveston, Middle Scoveston and Scoveston Grove.

In 1985, Scoveston Manor was the scene of a double murder and extensive fire. John Cooper was later convicted of this and other crimes. The following year, the house was sold and repurposed.

== See also ==
- Scoveston Fort - a Grade II Listed Building, which belongs to a series of forts built as part of the inner line of defence of the Haven.
