= Llanstadwell =

Village, parish and community in Pembrokeshire, Wales

Llanstadwell: Welsh: Llanstadwel
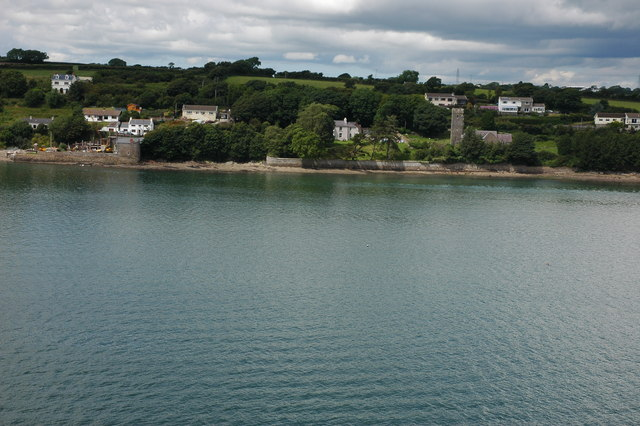
- Llanstadwell, Milford Haven

- Location within Pembrokeshire
- Population: 905
- OS grid reference: SM949049
- Community: Llanstadwell
- Principal area: Pembrokeshire
- Country: Wales
- Sovereign state: United Kingdom
- Post town: Milford Haven
- Postcode district: SA73
- Police: Dyfed-Powys
- Fire: Mid and West Wales
- Ambulance: Welsh
- UK Parliament: Mid and South Pembrokeshire
- Senedd Cymru – Welsh Parliament: Ceredigion Penfro
- List of places UK Wales Pembrokeshire 51.71°N 4.97°W Map of the community

Llanstadwell (Welsh: Llanstadwel) is a small village, parish and community in south Pembrokeshire, Wales.

== Geography ==
Llanstadwell lies on the north bank of the River Cleddau (Milford Haven Waterway) between Milford Haven (west) and Neyland (east). The parish of Rosemarket lies to the north.

The community of Llanstadwell includes the settlements of Waterston, Hazelbeach, Mascle Bridge (or Mastlebridge), Scoveston, Jordanston, and the western part of Honeyborough (formerly known as Little Honeyborough).
The A477 road crosses the north of the parish.

The population as of the 2011 UK Census was 905.

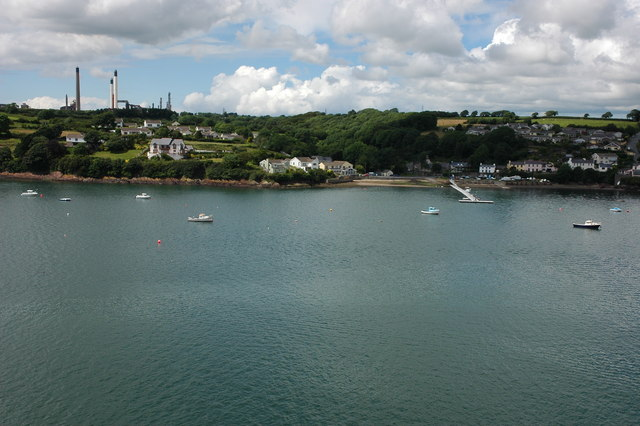
Hazelbeach,
seen from Milford Haven Waterway

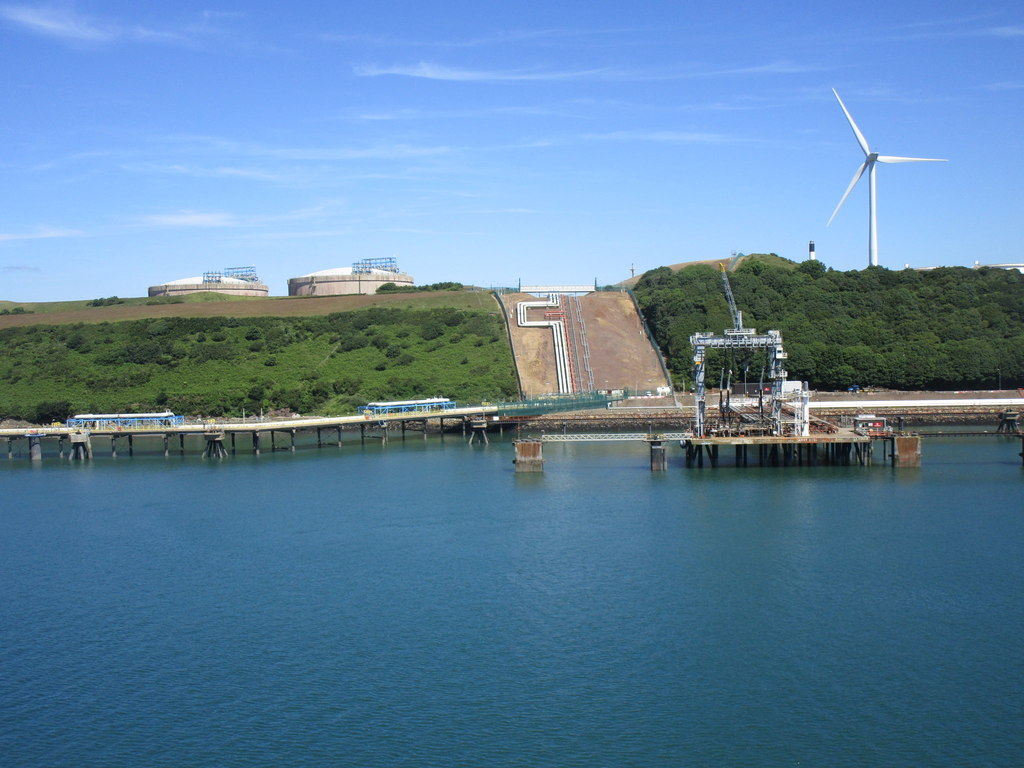
LNG terminal at Waterston (the oil storage tanks are on Milford Haven)

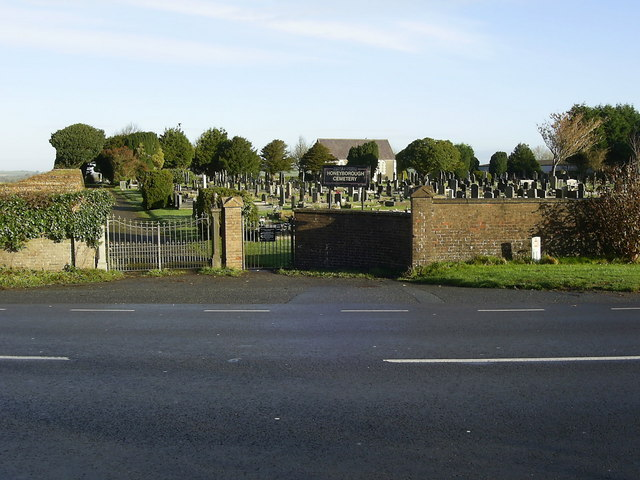
Honeyborough Cemetery

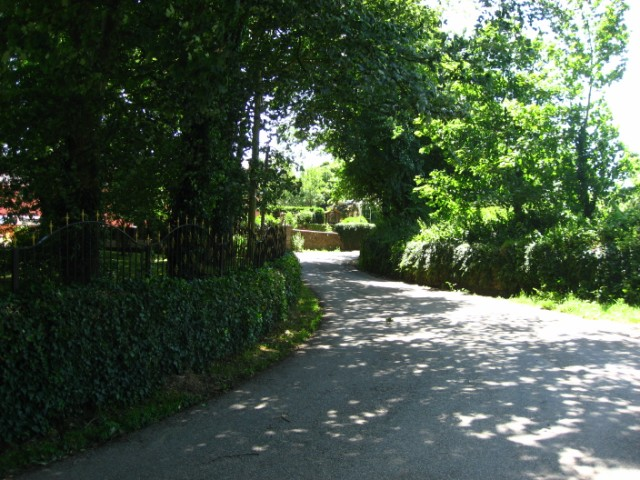
Leonardston Hall (left), on the road from Mascle Bridge to Hazelbeach

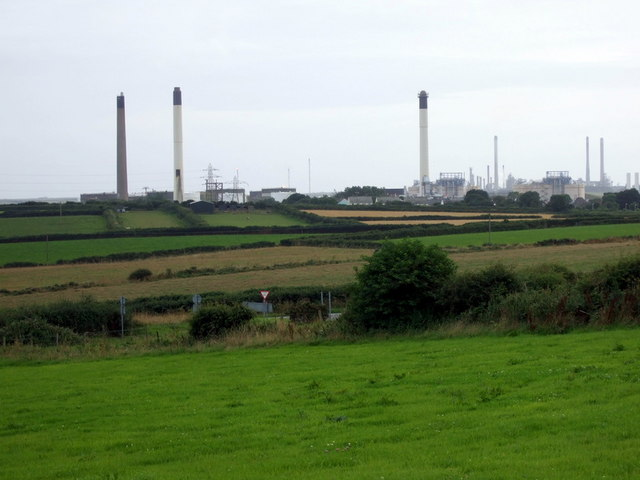
View southwest from Scoveston Fort

== Toponymy ==
The first element of Llanstadwell is 'Llan', denoting a church and surrounding settlement, with the second element believed to be connected to St Tudwal, to whom the parish church is dedicated. The name may have originally been 'Llansantudwal' ('Church of Saint Tudwal') which was contracted and then evolved into the modern name. The modern Welsh name is the same as the English but adapted to Welsh orthography.

== History ==
=== Bronze age ===
Among the ancient British sites within the present-day parish, are the remnants of a Bronze age roundhouse found in 2004 in Newton during a preventive archaeological excavation ahead of the construction of gas storage tanks adjacent to an old oil refinery; two radiocarbon dates on charred material from the roundhouse postsholes gave 1140-920 BC and 1450-1300 BC. The most spectacular find from the Bronze age is that of the Llanstadwell Celtic chariot burial and settlement.

==== Llanstadwell Celtic chariot and fort ====
In 2018, detectorist Mike Smith found the first remnants of a Celtic chariot burial in some farmland near the village of Waterston in 2018. As of 2024, this is the only chariot burial found in southern Britain. It provides important informations about the poorly known Demetae people, the Iron Age tribe that occupied this region in the pre-Roman and Roman period.

The grave was at the centre of a circular burial monument covered by a soil mound. A first group of artefacts — including fragments of the harness set — was declared a treasure the following year 2019. In March 2019, archaeological surveys and a major excavation of the chariot grave were executed by staff and volunteers led by Dyfed Archaeological Trust, with the participation of National Museum Wales, Cadw (Welsh equivalent of English Heritage), PLANED and Pembrokeshire College. A second collection of chariot fittings and grave goods was recovered, which was declared treasure on June 23, 2022, by HM Coroner for Pembrokeshire, Paul Bennett. The items of that second lot consist of iron tires and associated iron and bronze wheel hub fittings of a two-wheeled chariot, parts of bridle-bits and leather harness fittings, a complete iron sword with a segmented horn handle and that had been encased in a wooden sheath, fragments from two or three spears (suggesting the sepulture of a chief warrior), and some evidence indicating that the body had been laid out on the fighting platform of the chariot — the acidic soil having destroyed the bones of the burial.
The items are dated to the second half of the first century AD, a period when western Britain fought the invading Roman army.

The discovery of this burial mound has led to that of a previously unknown Iron Age promontory fort, also discovered during the archaeological investigations at the site and its surrounding area: the tomb is immediately outside the entrance of the multivallate fort with five lines of ditches and ramparts determined as of 2022. To the west of the chariot burial mound are c. 12 ring-ditches.

See also Wales in the Roman Era.

=== Middle Ages ===
The above-mentioned preventive archaeological excavation for gas storage tanks in Newton has revealed charred grain from corn driers, radiocarbon dated to the 8th-10th century; some pottery dated from the 12th-13th century, including a glazed ridge tile that may indicate a building of some status although no trace of that construction has been found; and remnants of a house and a round stone-built dovecote from the 16th century.

Llanstadwell was in the cantref of Rhos and became in the 16th century the Hundred of Roose.

The parish appears on a 1578 parish map of Pembrokeshire.

=== Modern times ===
The administrative parish of Llanstadwell originally included Neyland, which had grown enough by the start of the 20th century to have its own council. The ecclesiastical parish of Llanstadwell still includes Neyland, whose St Clement's Church is a daughter church to Llanstadwell.

In Newton, on the site of the above-mentioned 16th-century house and dovecote, a farmstead was built probably dating to the early 19th century; hardly any of it has survived, as it was demolished in the 1960s during construction of the oil refinery.

Scoveston Fort was built from 1861 to 1864.

During World War I a line of trenches ran to the north of the Haven, from Port Lion, Llangwm to Newton Point, Llanstadwell.

== Worship ==
The parish of Llanstadwell extends from the shore of the Cleddau as far north as Rosemarket and is largely rural with a few scattered hamlets. The parish church is dedicated to St Tudwal, and the area includes other places of worship at Little Honeyborough, Neyland (four chapels and a Roman Catholic church) and Waterston.

St Tudwal's is believed to date from the 12th century, and the bells from 1684, but much of the present church is mid-19th century.

== Music Festival ==
St Tudwal's Church established a music festival in 2013.

== Governance ==
The community has a community council and is part of the Neyland West Electoral ward of Pembrokeshire County Council. The community includes the settlements of Hazelbeach, Mascle Bridge (or Mastlebridge), Jordanston, Waterston and Little Honeyborough.
