= Newchurch =

Newchurch is the name of several places in the United Kingdom:

- Newchurch, Blaenau Gwent, Wales
- Newchurch, Carmarthenshire, Wales
- Newchurch, Herefordshire, England
- Newchurch, Isle of Wight, England
- Newchurch, Kent, England
- Newchurch, Lancashire, England
- Newchurch, Monmouthshire, Wales
- Newchurch, Powys, Wales
- Newchurch, Staffordshire, England
- Newchurch in Pendle, Lancashire
