= Pendine Museum of Speed =

- Amgueddfa Cyflymder Pentywyn
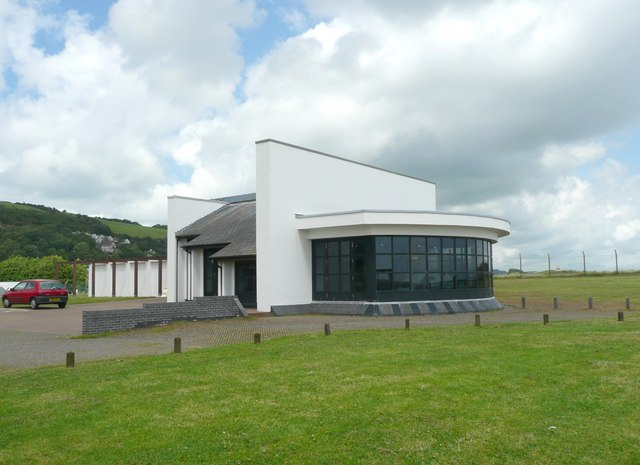
- View from the beach

- Location within Carmarthenshire
- Established: 1996
- Location: Pendine, Carmarthenshire, Wales
- Coordinates: 51.7425°N 4.5562°W
- Type: Transport museum
- Visitors: 33,522 (2009)
- Owner: Carmarthenshire County Council
- Website: The Museum of Land Speed

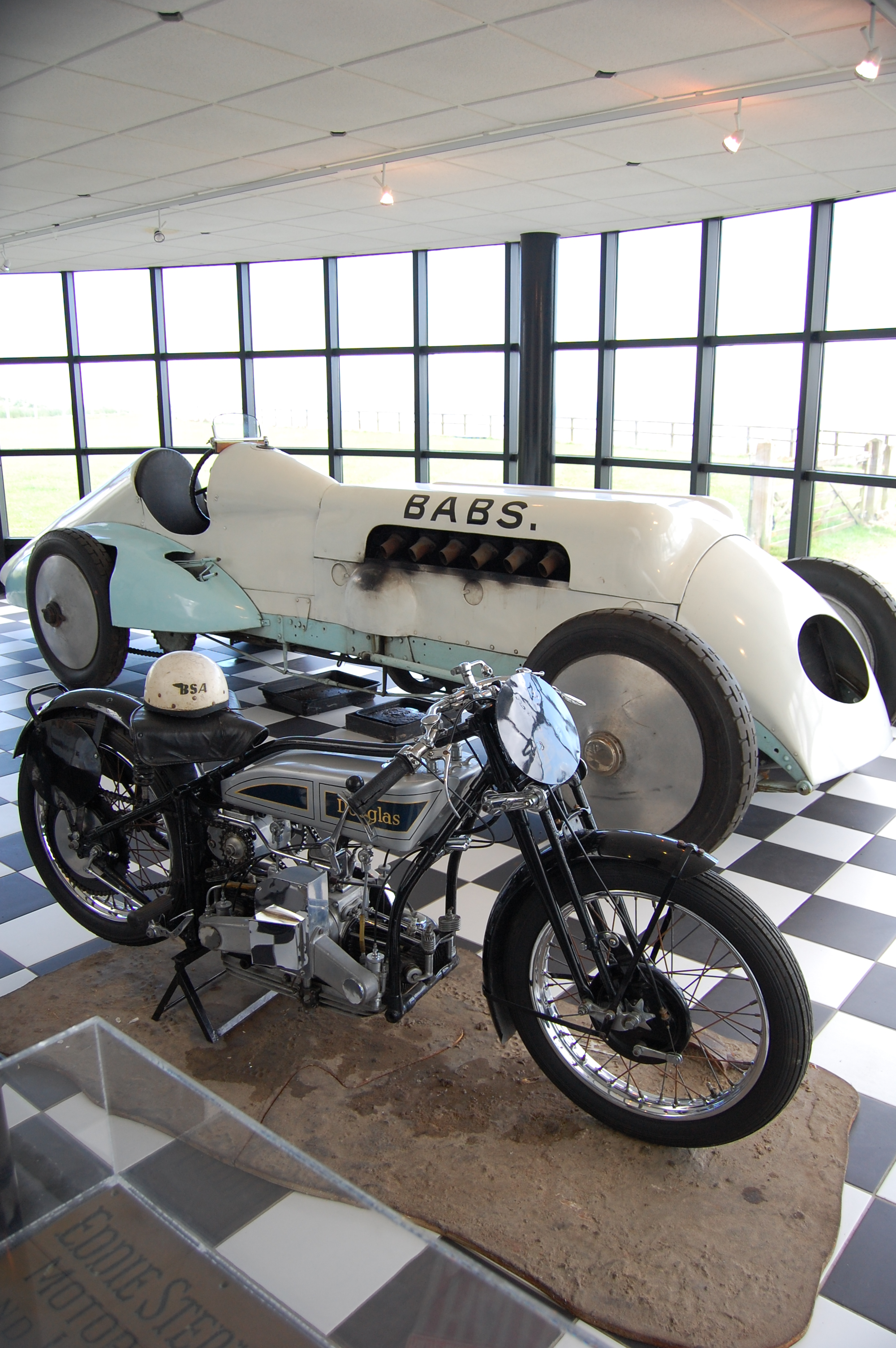
Inside the museum

The Pendine Museum of Speed (Welsh: Amgueddfa Cyflymder) is a museum detailing the history of Pendine Sands and its use for land speed record attempts. It was opened in 1996 in the village of Pendine, on the south coast of Wales, and is owned and run by Carmarthenshire County Council. The museum received 33,522 visitors in 2009.

For part of each summer the museum housed Babs, the land speed record car in which J. G. Parry-Thomas was killed in 1927. Babs was excavated in 1969 after 42 years of burial on the beach at Pendine Sands, and restored over the following 16 years by Owen Wyn Owen.

In 2018 it was decided to replace the 1990s museum building, at a cost of £7 million. In February 2021, the museum was closed and demolished. The new museum building was completed in early 2023 and opened on 31 March, as the Museum of Land Speed.

Babs was displayed at the Beaulieu Motor Museum until February 2019, and was returned to Pendine for the reopening of the Museum of Land Speed.

== See also ==
- British land speed record
