= Milton, Pembrokeshire =

Village in Pembrokeshire, Wales

Coordinates: 51.6923682°N 4.8457907°W

Milton
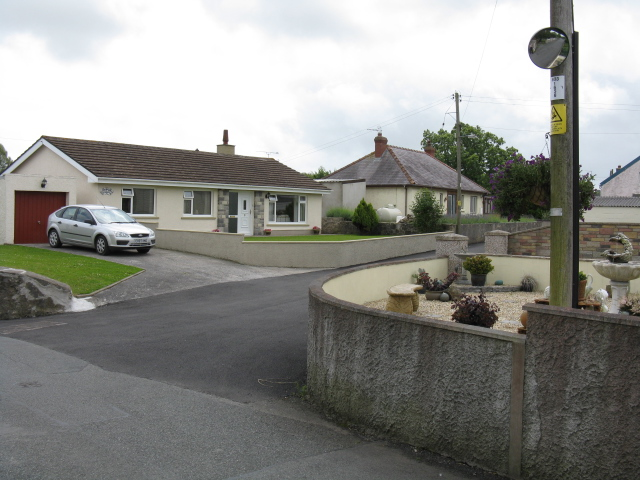
- Bungalows in Milton

- Location within Pembrokeshire
- OS grid reference: SN0403
- Community: Carew
- Principal area: Pembrokeshire
- Country: Wales
- Sovereign state: United Kingdom
- Post town: PEMBROKE
- Postcode district: SA70
- Police: Dyfed-Powys
- Fire: Mid and West Wales
- Ambulance: Welsh
- UK Parliament: Mid and South Pembrokeshire
- Senedd Cymru – Welsh Parliament: Ceredigion Penfro

Milton is a village in the community of Carew, in the county of Pembrokeshire in the south-west of Wales.

== Geography ==
Milton is a mile west of Sageston and Carew and two miles west of Redberth. The A477 road passes through the village. The built environment of the village includes cottages, vernacular houses and farm buildings, with a housing estate from the late 20th century on the outskirts of the village.

== History ==
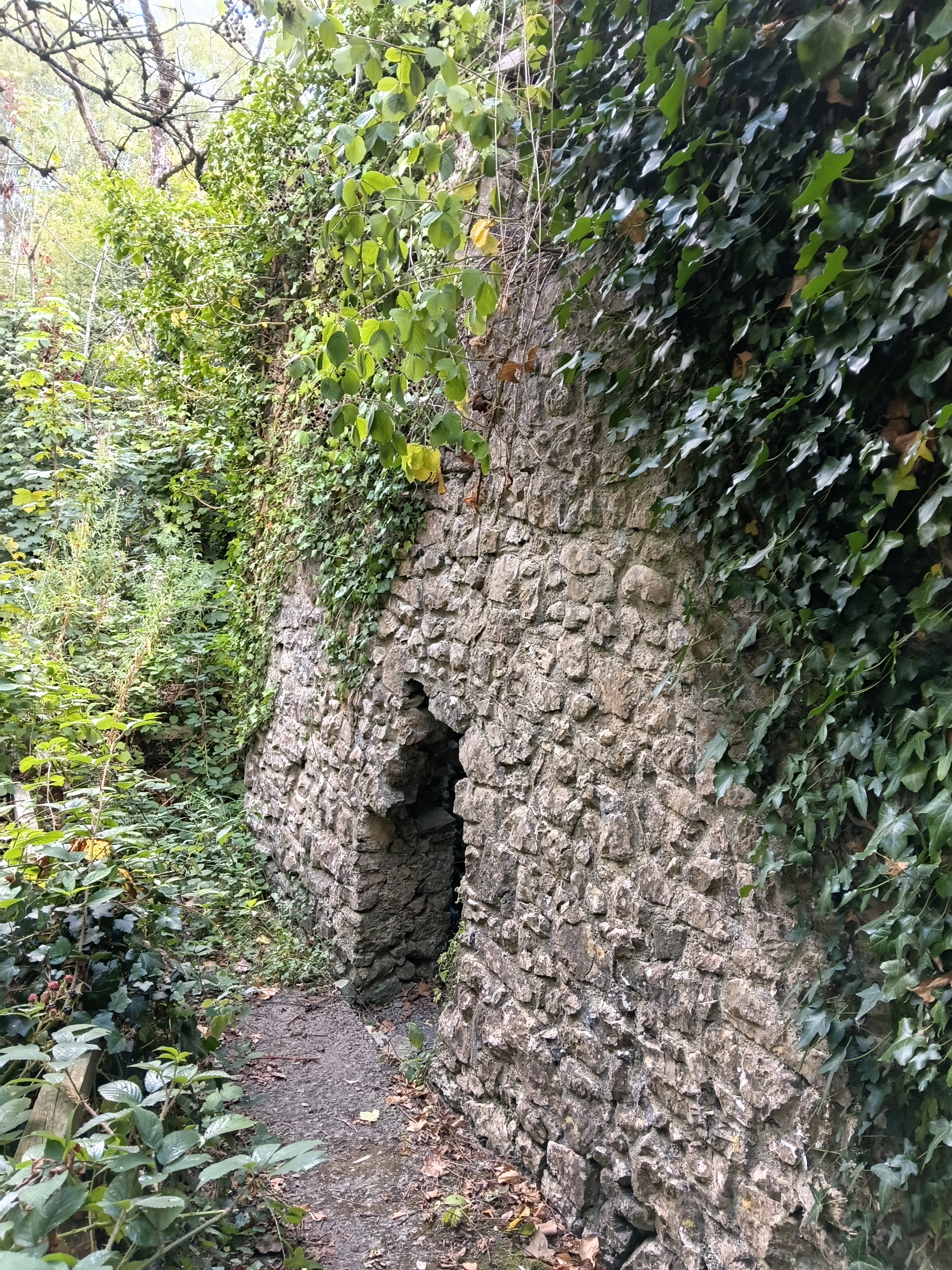
Ruins of a carding mill in Milton

The village is believed to date from the Middle Ages. In 1362 the area was owned by the Malefant family. Milton developed around the corn mill owned by the Baronry of Carew, and by the sixteenth century there were also multiple carding mills in the village. A second mill called Flemington Mill operated further upstream; this mill closed in 1820. In 1898 a waterworks and pumping station were established in the village, with the water incorporated into the public supply from 1915 until 1970, when the station was closed.

During World War II, Milton was hit by bombs on 22 July 1940 as part of a Luftwaffe night raid, along with neighbouring villages. It is likely that the target was the aerodrome bordering the village.

== Landmarks ==
Milton House is a mansion on the south of the A477. It was built in 1820 by the Barlow family on land previously occupied by a house belonging to the Upton Castle estate. As of 2013, the house was a hotel named Milton Manor.

== Culture and community ==
The Brewery Inn is in the village to the north of the A477. The pub was previously known as The Bridgend. A second pub called The Three Horseshoes used to exist in the village; by the 1930s, this had become a bakery.

Milton Play Park is a play area in the village. New outdoor exercise equipment was installed in the play area in 2025.
