= John Cooper (serial killer) =

Welsh serial killer (born 1944)

- Born: John William Cooper; 3 September 1944 (age 82); Milford Haven, Pembrokeshire, Wales
- Other name: The Bullseye Killer
- Convictions: 4 murders, 1 rape, 1 sexual assault, 30 burglaries, and 1 attempted robbery
- Penalty: Life imprisonment (whole life order)

Details
- Victims: 4–9 murder victims, others raped or burgled
- Span of crimes: 1985–1998
- Country: United Kingdom (Wales)
- State: Pembrokeshire
- Date apprehended: 2009

John William Cooper (born 3 September 1944), also known as the Bullseye killer, is a Welsh serial killer. On 26 May 2011, he was given a whole life order for the 1985 double murder of siblings Richard and Helen Thomas, and the 1989 double murder of Peter and Gwenda Dixon. The murders were known in the media as the "Pembrokeshire Murders" or the "Coastal Murders". Cooper was also sentenced for the rape of a 16-year-old girl and a sexual assault on a 15-year-old girl, both carried out while a group of five teenagers were held at gunpoint in March 1996, in a wooded area behind the Mount Estate in Cooper's hometown of Milford Haven, Pembrokeshire.

Cooper had a history of criminal activities, including thirty robberies and violent assaults. Footage from the television game show Bullseye in May 1989, in which he appeared as a contestant, was later used as evidence against him, comparing his image with a sketch of a suspect in the Dixons' murder.

Cooper was sentenced to 14 years in 1998 for robbery and burglary. He was released from prison in January 2009. Because of subsequent developments in DNA and forensic science, the police carried out a cold case review in April 2009 and were able to identify Cooper's shotgun as being the murder weapon. Further DNA evidence was provided by forensic scientist Angela Gallop. The police collected further evidence against him and Cooper was arrested again in May 2009. He was convicted, on 26 May 2011, for the double murders and sexual assaults and sentenced to four life sentences without the possibility of parole. Cooper was also given a whole life order, meaning that he will never leave prison alive, with presiding judge John Griffith Williams saying "the murders were of such evil wickedness that the mandatory sentence of life will mean just that." He is serving his sentence in an undisclosed prison.

== Criminal history ==
Between the ages of 17 and 21, Cooper was charged with theft of a vehicle, assaulting a police officer, being drunk and disorderly, and assault occasioning actual bodily harm (ABH).

In 1978, Cooper, then a farm labourer, won £90,000 (worth over £600,000 today) and also a £4,000 car in a newspaper spot the ball competition. A friend said: "John developed a huge drink and gambling habit after his winnings went to his head... It was a life-changing amount of money and I saw a real change in him. He spent most of it in pubs and bookies... People were scared of him and he got into a lot of fights. As his money dried up he started the robberies."

On 22 December 1985, Cooper targeted a three-storey farmhouse at Scoveston Park, killing brother and sister Richard and Helen Thomas, and then burning down the house.

On 29 June 1989, Peter and Gwenda Dixon were on holiday in Pembrokeshire and set off to take their last walk along the coastal path but failed to return. Their dead bodies were later found along the path. Cooper had tied the couple up, demanded they hand out their bank card and then forced them to disclose their personal identification number (PIN). Cooper, carrying a sawn-off shotgun, robbed Peter Dixon of £300 and shot the couple in the face at point-blank range. In 1996, he attacked five youngsters, threatening them with a gun, sexually assaulting one girl and raping another. By 1998, Cooper had committed 30 burglaries and an armed robbery. Footage from an edition of the ITV gameshow Bullseye recorded on 28 May 1989, on which Cooper was a contestant, was later used to match him to a sketch made from witness descriptions.

In 2011, Cooper was sentenced to life Imprisonment with a Whole Life Order for the crimes. In September 2011, he launched an appeal against his convictions. His appeal was rejected in November 2012. In April 2023, he made an application to the Criminal Cases Review Commission requesting a review of his conviction.

Cooper was diagnosed as a psychopath.

== Documentaries and television ==
The UK television series Real Crime broadcast a documentary about Cooper in November 2011. On 24 May 2016, the Welsh language television channel S4C broadcast a documentary in the series Y Ditectif (The Detective) about the way in which evidence against Cooper was gathered using the latest forensic techniques available at the time, the strategy used by Dyfed-Powys Police in interviewing him and his eventual conviction. On 27 September 2016, the ITV Cymru Wales television channel broadcast a documentary in the series Crime Files which examined how police solved the two double murder cases in Pembrokeshire including an interview with the detective who was tasked with interviewing Cooper. On 12 July 2018, a documentary about Cooper, named The Gameshow Serial Killer: Police Tapes, was aired by ITV as part of the channel's "Crime and Punishment" season. On 29 January 2019, the UK version of digital channel CBS Reality premiered a further documentary about Cooper's crimes in an episode of its true crime series Murder by the Sea.

In January 2021, ITV broadcast a three-part television series entitled The Pembrokeshire Murders, most exterior scenes of which were filmed on location in Pembrokeshire. This was followed by an hour-long documentary, The Pembrokeshire Murders: Catching The Game Show Killer, featuring interviews with Detective Superintendent Steve Wilkins, the man who reopened the investigation; forensic scientists involved in the case; and footage of Cooper as he was interviewed by police.

== Possible links to other crimes ==
=== Death of Flo Evans ===
In May 2011, after Cooper was convicted of the four murders, it was revealed that police were considering reopening an inquiry into the unexplained death in 1989 of a woman who lived near Cooper and only two miles from Scoveston Park, the site of his 1985 murders. Flo Evans, a 72-year-old widow, died soon after Cooper murdered Peter and Gwenda Dixon in 1989, being found fully-clothed in a half-full cold bath in her cottage. Cooper and his wife Pat both knew Evans and would visit her regularly at her smallholding, with Cooper often completing odd jobs for her. She was unexpectedly mentioned by Cooper in his trial as part of his own defence evidence, and during interviews he discussed how he had been in her house, when detectives were already aware of her suspicious death. Her home was in the centre of the area where Cooper committed his burglaries. The family of Evans had long suspected her death was suspicious and not an accident, particularly as she never took baths and as she would not have had any hot water at the time of her death, as no fire had been lit in the kitchen. Evans's death was officially recorded as accidental, with it said at the time that she must have slipped into the bath and hit her head and then drowned. Police contacted the widow's family after Cooper's conviction to discuss her death, saying there was "connectivity" between Cooper and Evans.

In the 2021 documentary The Pembrokeshire Murders: Catching The Game Show Killer, shown on ITV after the broadcast of The Pembrokeshire Murders, the case of Flo Evans was again discussed. Detective Superintendent Steve Wilkins, who oversaw the investigation and convictions of Cooper in 2011, said that Evans was a likely fifth victim of Cooper. Evans did not lock her door, yet it was found to be locked when her body was discovered. Evans had mentioned to friends days before her murder that she couldn't find her house keys. Items of property were also taken from her house including money and shotguns, which fitted Cooper's modus operandi. Cooper regularly burgled the homes of people he knew and reacted violently if disturbed. It is thought Cooper would have known where Evans kept her money. Wilkins said that Cooper "had been at her house on the day she died" and stated that Evans's death should have been a murder inquiry, adding that her death "disturbs me greatly".

=== Murders of Harry and Megan Tooze ===
After Cooper's convictions in 2011, it was revealed that detectives were investigating whether there was any "connectivity" between Cooper and the unsolved murders of a couple who were shot at close range at their remote farmhouse at Llanharry near Bridgend in 1993. Harry Tooze, 64, and his wife Megan, 67, had been shot in the head, their bodies dumped in a cowshed and then covered with a carpet. Some similarities with Cooper's known murders were noted, including the fact that both victims were shot at close range and attempts made to hide their bodies. The weapon involved was a shotgun, such as Cooper used in his known crimes. It was also observed that there were very few double shotgun murders nationally and that Cooper was already known to have committed two of these. In 2011, the year Cooper was convicted, the case was re-examined by police. The case remains one of Wales' most notorious unsolved murders.

=== Deaths of Griff and Patti Thomas ===
In 2011 a forensic psychologist, Clive Sims, claimed to the BBC that the deaths of an elderly brother and sister at their farmhouse in Pembrokeshire in 1976 could be linked to Cooper. Griff and Patti Thomas, aged 73 and 70 respectively, were found dead in December 1976, and their deaths were originally classified as a double murder until it was decided that Griff Thomas must have argued with the sister he had lived with for 70 years, before hitting her on the head with a blunt instrument and setting himself on fire.

Speaking to BBC Wales's Taro Naw current affairs programme, Sims questioned the verdict of manslaughter in the case of Patti Thomas and an open verdict in the case of Griff Thomas. Although it was said that Patti was hit by a blunt instrument, no weapon was ever found. Sims said that the pair were killed by an intruder following a botched burglary, something Cooper was known to have committed in the same area in later years, as in Cooper's 1985 double murder at Scoveston Park. A cash box had been emptied at the house, the bureau had been broken into, and the back door was unlocked. Sims highlighted how it was highly unlikely that a serial killer would start killing at age 40, Cooper's age when he committed his first known murders in 1985, and said that it was highly likely that he started killing earlier.

Over many years, public campaigning has taken place on the basis that the inquest verdicts were not safe and that there was a case for further investigation to establish whether a third person may have been responsible for the deaths. In October 2022, Dyfed-Powys Police detectives began a forensic review into the deaths of the brother and sister. Police have said they were "keeping an open mind" but warned they were unsure what answers – if any – would be provided by the review, and that they will continue to keep the family informed of any developments. In August 2026, it was announced that the forensic review would end almost four years after it began, despite not delivering any new conclusions.

== See also ==
- Rodney Alcala (1943–2021) – American serial killer who appeared as a game-show contestant
- Sarah Boone - American murderer who in 2020 at the age of 42, murdered her boyfriend Jorge Torres by zipping him up inside a suitcase. Appeared as a contestant on Nick Arcade in 1992.
- François Vérove (1962–2021) – French serial killer who appeared as a game-show contestant
- Göhrde murders – a series of murders in a forest region in Northern Germany in 1989 with a similar pattern. For some time German investigators assumed a link to the Pembrokeshire murders which, however, failed to be corroborated.
- Joseph Kappen (1941–1990) – Wales' first documented serial killer
- List of serial killers in the United Kingdom
