= Cleddau Bridge =

Bridge on the River Cleddau, Wales

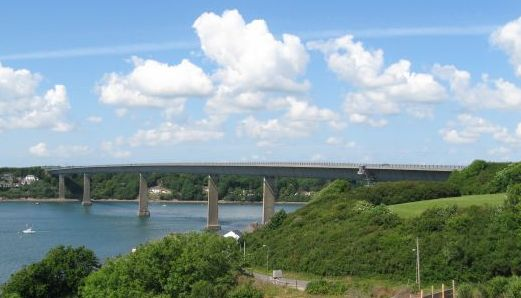
- Cleddau bridge, 2008
- Coordinates: 51°42′23″N 4°56′01″W
- Carries: A477 traffic, pedestrians and bicycles
- Crosses: River Cleddau
- Locale: Pembrokeshire, Wales
- Maintained by: Pembrokeshire County Council

Characteristics
- Design: Box girder
- Total length: 0.51 miles (0.82 km)

History
- Opened: 20 March 1975

Statistics
- Daily traffic: 10,905
- Toll: Free

Location
- Interactive map of Cleddau Bridge

The Cleddau Bridge (pronounced [ˈklɛðai], Welsh: Pont Cleddau) in Pembrokeshire, Wales, carries the A477 road over the River Cleddau between Neyland and Pembroke Dock.

Errors in the box girder design caused the bridge to collapse during construction in 1970. The bridge became operational during 1975 and is managed by Pembrokeshire County Council.

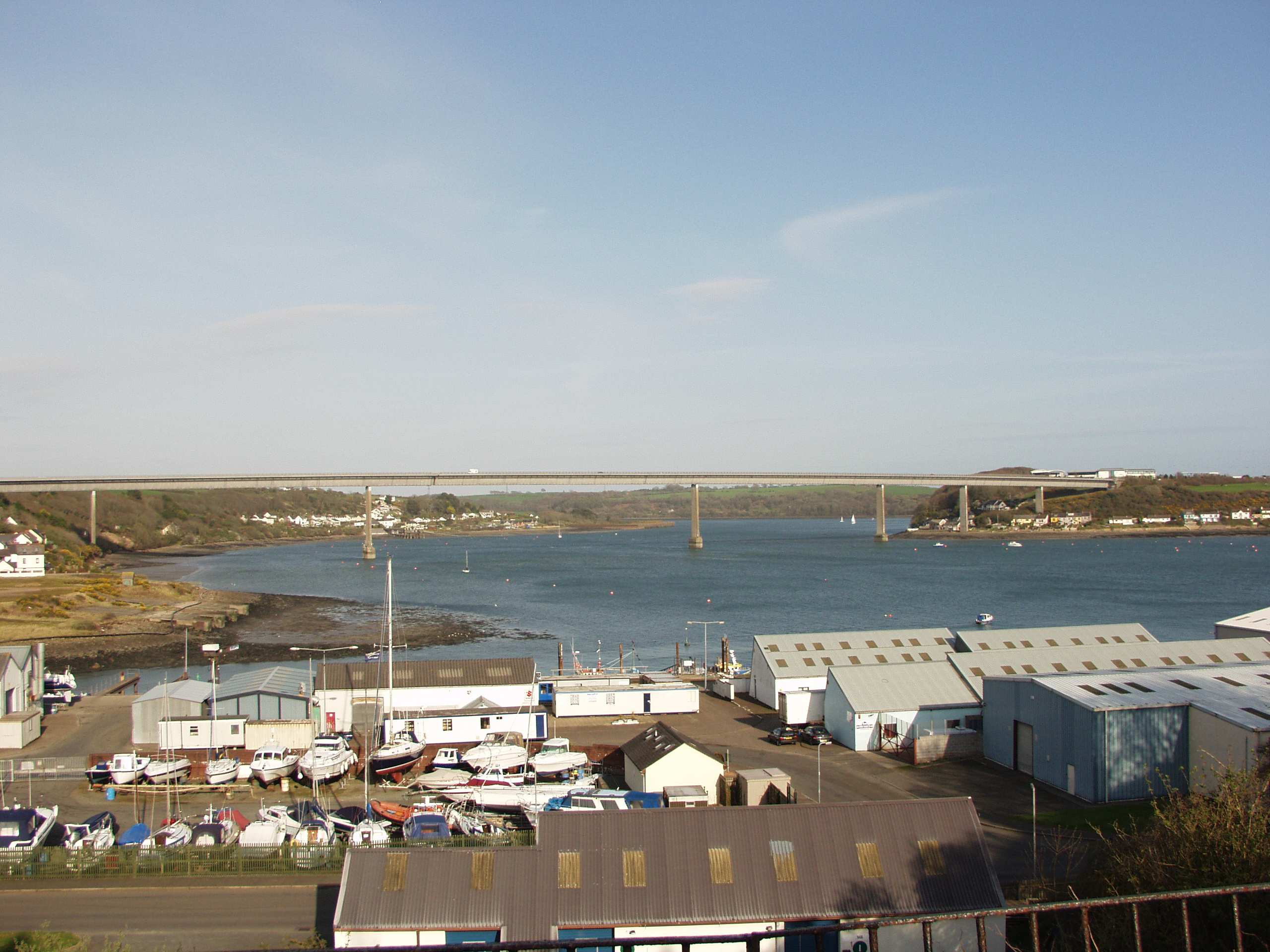
Cleddau Bridge viewed from Neyland

== History ==
Pembrokeshire is divided by the Cleddau. Hobbs Point in Pembroke Dock on the south side and Neyland on the north side are less than 1 mile (1.6 km) apart across the waterway but to drive from one to the other, a journey of 28 miles (45 km) by road was required. Between 1858 and 1950, the Admiralty permitted operation of steam ferries between the two towns. From 1950, the County Council operated a ferry service, with capacity for 24 vehicles and 250 pedestrians.

A decision was taken in the 1960s to replace the ferry service: two bridges would be required, one crossing the Cleddau and a smaller bridge to the north of Neyland crossing Westfield Pill creek. Sir Alexander Gibb & Partners and Freeman Fox and Partners were appointed as joint consulting engineers and the contract to build the bridge was awarded to A.E. Farr Limited in September 1968 for £2.1 million.

The project was expected to be completed by March 1971 but on 2 June 1970 a 230-foot (70 m) cantilever being used to put one of the 150-tonne sections into position collapsed on the south side of the estuary. Four workers died and five were injured. Construction was halted until October 1972. The Merrison Committee of Inquiry into the Design and Erection of Steel Box Girder Bridges concluded that the cause of the collapse was the inadequacy of the design of a pier support diaphragm (a diaphragm of half the designed thickness was used), but considered "the failure of site organisation between the parties as of more general significance". The committee believed that the only relevant Code of Practice relating to the design of steel bridges in the UK was inadequate for applications such as the Cleddau Bridge, and they implemented Interim Design and Workmanship Rules. These rules laid the groundwork for a new British Standard covering box girder bridge design. As of 2007, the collapse during construction is the last major bridge disaster in the UK.

The final cost of construction was £11.83 million and the bridge was opened to traffic on 20 March 1975. The £7 million of overspend was attributed to design changes made due to the Merrison Committee's recommendations. This was covered by a £3 million out-of-court settlement between the County Council and the consulting engineers and a £4 million interest-free loan from the Government that was repayable over 40 years. 885,900 crossings were made during the bridge's first year in operation.

It was originally called the Milford Haven Bridge. The ferry service between Hobbs Point and Neyland ceased when the construction of the Cleddau Bridge was completed in 1975. The ferry Cleddau King was sold, modified by Harland & Wolff of Belfast and put into operation as a reserve Portaferry–Strangford ferry in Northern Ireland.

Formerly, tolls were collected on the south side of the bridge from traffic travelling in both directions. Toll booths with barriers were introduced in September 2004 to reduce the number of vehicles driving through without paying. The bridge has been toll-free since 28 March 2019.

== Closures ==
The county council may close the bridge depending on wind speed, wind direction and the weather forecast. Vehicles taller than 1.9 m (6 ft 3 in), bicycles and motorcycles are usually not permitted to cross the bridge when wind speeds exceed 50 mph (80 km/h). The bridge is closed to all vehicles and pedestrians should wind speeds exceed 70 mph (110 km/h). The council records the time the bridge is closed.

== Memorial ==
A memorial plaque to the four men who died in the bridge collapse was unveiled on the 25th anniversary of the disaster in 1995, but was reported stolen in 2017.

== See also ==
- List of bridges in Wales
