= Llanmiloe =

Village in Carmarthenshire, Wales

Coordinates: 51.748°N 4.529°W

Llanmiloe: Welsh: Llanmilo
- Location within Carmarthenshire
- Population: 200
- OS grid reference: SN2508
- Community: Llanddowror
- Principal area: Carmarthenshire
- Country: Wales
- Sovereign state: United Kingdom
- Post town: Carmarthen
- Postcode district: SA33
- Dialling code: 01994
- Police: Dyfed-Powys
- Fire: Mid and West Wales
- Ambulance: Welsh
- UK Parliament: Caerfyrddin
- Senedd Cymru – Welsh Parliament: Carmarthen West and South Pembrokeshire

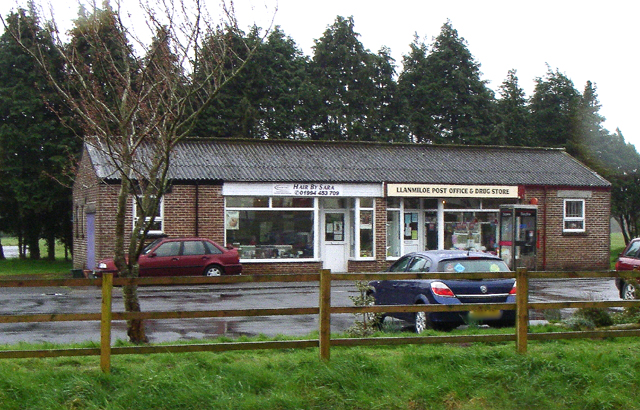
Shops in Llanmiloe in 2006

Llanmiloe (Welsh: Llanmilo) is a village in the south-west of Carmarthenshire, Wales, on the A4066 road, between the villages of Laugharne to the north-east and Pendine to the south-west. Llanmiloe House dates from the 1720s and is a Grade II listed building. Its park is listed, also at Grade II, on the Cadw/ICOMOS Register of Parks and Gardens of Special Historic Interest in Wales.

== History ==
Pre-World War II Llanmiloe was a very small place consisting of Llanmiloe House, Three cottages at Llanmiloe Bach and West Mead Farm, However, with the start of the war this was about to change in a drastic way. In 1938, a joint services conference was held at which it was decided to form an inter service small arms Experimental Establishment. The new Establishment was opened at Foulness, early in 1940, as part of the ministry of supply. After Dunkirk and under the threat of invasion it became apparent that the site chosen was unsuitable. Pendine was selected as a temporary wartime location, after a rapid survey of sites available. Under the first Superintendent, Captain (later Rear Admiral) S.A Pears C.S.E R.N, the staff, newly recruited from Foulness and Shoeburyness, together with the experimental wing from Hythe, moved to Pendine in June 1940. And it was called P&EE Pendine A temporary headquarters was established in the 'Beach Hotel' and other buildings were requisitioned to provide accommodation for personnel and equipment. The village garage became the official workshops area. This was all temporary until the prefabricated bungalows were built in the grounds of Llanmiloe House in December 1941. However the local Squire's mansion, Llanmiloe House, was compulsory acquired. The Squire, Morgan-Jones, was given alternative accommodation in an old mansion seventeen miles inland, he was so unhappy about his dispossession that he committed suicide.

During 1944–45, a welfare centre and Church were built adjacent to the housing estate. This was where the Medical doctor was situated, as well as caring for the civilian employees and Military personnel and their families belonging to P&EE Pendine, the Doctor was also allowed to use the facilities as a satellite surgery of St Clears which provided an extension for his general practice patients who resided in and around the Pendine area. This system benefited many of the local inhabitants not connected with the Establishment, therefore fostering good relations with the general public living in the sparsely populated area. Many of these people had to give up their homes (having no choice whatsoever) so that the land could be used for important trials. They must have felt resentful in some respects, but naturally the Government found other suitable accommodation.

Over the years that followed the MOD not only developed the Experimental ranges but in conjunction with the Ministry of Works also developed the living areas outside of the range facilities the Range camp and Sgt's Mess was built in front of Llanmiloe Bach. The married quarter area's known as Woodend and Dukes Meadow were built between Llanmiloe and the village of Pendine. During the Second World War it was found that Pendine could undertake much larger Trials than originally thought. In 1945, the Armament Development Board undertook a review of all ranges and it was decided that Pendine be kept as a permanent Establishment. The Decision was approved in 1948 and Pendine became an official Experimental Range.

They further went on to reclaim marsh land in order to create a large sports field for Cricket and Football, with a bowling green on the side they Built three small shops and the Pendine Social Club which was a members club for all the staff of P&EE Pendine and their families, complete with Bar a large function hall for parties and shows, and a kitchen and canteen for dining. In 1954, they built a new Medical Centre complete with Consultation, Examination and Resuscitation Rooms. By the mid-1950s, Llanmiloe had grown in dramatic fashion and was a busy thriving community. The ranges themselves had grown, covering an area of around seven miles in length, and employed up to two thousand personnel who were shipped in daily from the surrounding towns and villages. This was to remain for many decades to follow.

By the beginning of the 1990s, communism had fallen bringing an end to the cold war. Cut backs in Defence were happening across the country and P&EE Pendine would endure some of these cuts as well. Through the first half of the 90's P&EE Pendine would lose over half its work force and by 1997 the Ministry of Defence would pull out of the area completely; however the ranges were taken over by civilian organisations involved with Defence and Proof and Experimental work. The work force however reduced to around 10 - 15% of what it was in its heyday, the work no less important but a lot more diverse. It is still a centre of excellence in its field today. When the MOD moved out the civilian companies had no interest in maintaining the surrounding area as the cost was great, but the MOD did not want the facilities they had created over the years to be taken away or fall into ruin as these were a focal part of the community. So they handed the area over to Welsh Development Agency now the Welsh assembly. They in turn wanted to keep the Land open and available to the residents of Llanmiloe and surrounding area's so they looked for volunteers from the community who would take on the day-to-day running of the facilities and up keep of the area. Thus the Llanmiloe Community Association (LCA) was formed, at the time they were based out of the Pendine Social Club. Over the next few years the area underwent another face lift, with the pre-fabricated housing built way back in the 1940s (the front row) being knocked down and the local housing association 'Bro myrddin' building new more modern housing across most of the estate. The old range camp and seargeant's mess were demolished as they had become unused and unsafe. Shortly after the start of the new millennium the LCA departed from the social club and moved into the old medical centre now known as the Resource Centre, this is where it changed from a charity to a limited company. Here it remains but has changed completely since its original formation some years ago. It is now run by all new volunteers and has changed its name to the Llanmiloe and District Community Association.

Llanmiloe village takes its name from Llanmiloe House, a Grade II listed country mansion built in 1720. The mansion itself takes its name from the wooded escarpment Coed Llanmiloe to the north of the house. The earliest known record of the property is from 1615 when Rowland Mortimer acquired the land from Sir John Lewes. The park surrounding the house is designated Grade II on the Cadw/ICOMOS Register of Parks and Gardens of Special Historic Interest in Wales.

Little else other than a few cottages existed until 1941 when the military, who had established a base at Pendine in 1940, compulsorily-purchased the house.

The military establishment continued to develop after the war with housing for personnel, together with a church and medical centre. By the 1990s, the military activities were being run down significantly, and in 1997 the Ministry of Defence ceased to run the base, parts of which were taken over by commercial enterprises. The remainder of the land was passed to the Welsh Development Agency and was subsequently run by and for the benefit of the remaining community.

Development has continued into the 21st century, and there is now continuous built-up area between Llanmiloe and Pendine village, with houses, shops and holiday accommodation.

== Geography ==
Due to the wide variety of habitat - dense woodland to the rear of the village and agricultural and marsh land cut by open drainage water courses (known locally as pills) to the front and sides, the area is rich in wildlife and attracts naturalists and bird watchers. The seashore, Pendine Sands, is a few hundred yards to the south.

There are areas designated as SSSIs (Site of Special Scientific Interest) on the unspoiled MoD land immediately adjacent to the recreation ground.

== Amenities ==
- Resource centre for the community, with pottery room, carpenter's workshop, poly-tunnels and function room
- Llanmiloe Community Primary School (Ysgol Llanmiloe). In 2008 the school had 36 pupils aged 4 to 11.
- Recreation ground
- Llanmiloe Post Office

== Notable people ==
- Sir James Perrot a Welsh writer and politician who sat in the House of Commons at various times between 1597 and 1629.
