= Carmarthenshire Land Sailing Club =

Land sailing club in South Wales

Carmarthenshire Land Sailing Club, was formed in 2004 in order to allow Landsailing use of Pembrey Sands (Cefn Sidan) and Pendine Sands, in South Wales.

== History ==
The Club, was created from the now defunct, Pendine Wind Sports Club and the Cefn Sidan Landyachting Club, in order to provide a single organisation to allow controlled use of the beaches for Landyachting and associated sports.

Access to Pembrey was opened again on 7 November 2004, after a ban was enforced by Carmarthenshire council.

Access to Pendine was opened again on 28 May 2005, after a similar ban was enforced by Carmarthenshire council.

== Regulation ==
Use of the beaches for Landsailing, is restricted to members of Carmarthenshire Land Sailing Club, who hold the specified £5M Public Liability insurance, as stipulated by Carmarthenshire council.

Unfortunately as of December 31, 2007 the club is no longer affiliated to the British Federation of Sand & Landyacht Clubs (BFSLYC).

The club welcomes members from all aspects of Landsailing, including Kite buggies, Speedsails, Blokarts, Land yachts and Kitewings. The only classes of land yacht not permitted on either Pendine or Pembrey are Class 2 Land yachts.

== Other Events ==
The beaches are used annually by arrangement with Carmarthenshire Council to host rounds of the Supercup Race Series, and in September 2007, hosted the 2007 European Parakart Championships at Pembrey.

There is now some discussion going on between club members as to the direction of the club. Some members wish to take the club in a more social direction while some wish to keep it more of a hardcore landsailing club.
