= Llanddowror =

Village and community in Carmarthenshire, Wales

Coordinates: 51.80091°N 4.53362°W

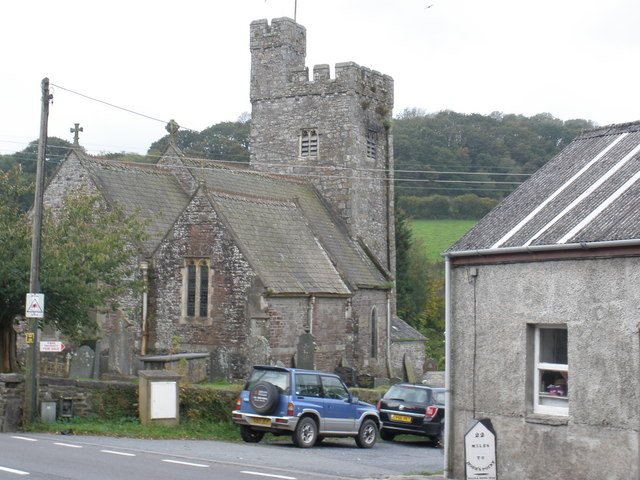
- St Teilo's Church (2008)
- Population: 851 (2011)
- OS grid reference: SN254144
- Community: Llanddowror
- Principal area: Carmarthenshire
- Preserved county: Carmarthenshire
- Country: Wales
- Sovereign state: United Kingdom
- Post town: CARMARTHEN
- Postcode district: SA33
- Dialling code: 01994
- Police: Dyfed-Powys
- Fire: Mid and West Wales
- Ambulance: Welsh
- UK Parliament: Caerfyrddin
- Senedd Cymru – Welsh Parliament: Carmarthen West and South Pembrokeshire
- List of places UK Wales Carmarthenshire Map of the community

Llanddowror is a village and community in Carmarthenshire, Wales situated 2 miles (3 km) from St. Clears. Previously on the trunk road to Pembroke Dock, the village is small, historic and relatively unspoilt.

Llanddowror is famous for being the home of its rector, Griffith Jones, the 18th century Anglican educator and promoter of Methodism, who was funded by Bridget Bevan in organising circulating schools to spread literacy in Carmarthenshire.

The community is bordered to the south by Carmarthen Bay and inland with the communities of Pendine, Eglwyscummin, St Clears and Laugharne Township.

The community includes the village of Llanmiloe and New Mill.

== Amenities ==
A new bypass improvement scheme for the section of the A477 trunk road between St Clears and Red Roses was approved by the Welsh Government on 27 January 2012. Construction work on the new bypass began in mid-2012. Constructed with a straighter alignment and bypassing the villages of Llanddowror and Red Roses, the new section opened to general traffic on 16 April 2014, having been declared open by Edwina Hart, Welsh Assembly Member for Transport.

Rental holiday cottages and bed & breakfast locations are available in Llanddowror. A local attraction is the nearby ruin of the Norman castle in St Clears.

== Imperial Legacy ==
Llanddowror has lent its name to the British Raj-era hill station of Landour (now in Mussoorie, Uttarakhand) in the Lower Western Himalaya in northern India. Landour was founded in 1827 as a convalescent station for British soldiers serving in India. During British colonial rule, nostalgic British names were common in India and many of these names survive today although many others were discarded once India became an independent state.
