= Barry John (artist) =

Welsh abstract visual artist and soldier

Barry John MBE is a Welsh soldier and artist. He served in the British armed forces for over 23 years. In the 2010 New Years Honours List Barry John was awarded the MBE. He is mainly an abstract artist.

Barry John was born in Neyland, Pembrokeshire and was a pupil at Sir Thomas Picton School, Haverfordwest before joining the Army at the age of 16. His first posting to was to Hong Kong, and further postings to Korea, Malaysia, Jamaica, USA, Northern Ireland and Kosovo followed. The experiences he has had during his service have formed most of the content of his art.

For a time, John worked as a recruiting officer in Haverfordwest, but later rejoined the Welsh Regiment.

In 2013, John organised the Neyland Armistice Project, a collaborative art project to commemorate the 100th anniversary of the First World War.

After 24 years of service in the Army, John set up The VC Gallery in 2014.

== The VC Gallery ==
The VC Gallery is a charity based at 30 High Street Haverfordwest, Pembrokeshire. John had experience during his service of mental health work and PTSD and, combined with his artistic skills, he realised a need in his community for such a charity to use art to help overcome issues faced by veterans. The Gallery focuses on working with veterans, older people, children and anyone in the local community who feels they need time out to express themselves through art and creativity. As John says, "its all about socialising, community and art."

== Artwork and Exhibitions and Awards ==
John has held many solo art exhibitions throughout the UK and Europe and many group exhibitions including the John Creasey Museum in Salisbury and Exeter Castle. He has also exhibited in the Waterfront Gallery, Milford Haven, with an exhibition titled 'Homecoming', opened by Andrew Vicari. At the Mall Gallery, London, in the Armed Forces exhibition with Prince Charles and opened by the then Secretary of Defense, where John was presented with the Templar Award for Art. John did a number of pieces at the Art of Remembrance showing work on the Welsh at Mametz Wood. His work has also been auctioned as part of the Square Mile Salute. In 2017 he won an award for community work with at the Pride of Britain Awards and has won a Local Heros award for art three times. In 2019 he was awarded the Points of Light award from then prime minister Theresa May.

In August 2017 John held a solo exhibition at the Late November Gallery, Haverfordwest, opened by the former New York Times art critic, John Russell Taylor. In February 2018 John held a solo art exhibition called 'Remains of the Day' at Tenby Museum and Art Gallery. The exhibition featured a number of works including examples of his 'black graffiti' and Geisha girls.

John's work has been compared to Jean-Michel Basquiat, painting in a similar neo-expressionist style, stemming from the tradition of graffiti and street art.

John has works in museums and galleries including Kooywood Gallery, Cardiff, Pure Art, Milford Haven, Brunswick Gallery London, Trinity Fine Art, Broadway Luxury Gallery, Cotswolds, and the Fleek Gallery in Devon.
