= Owen Wyn Owen =

Automobile restorer

- Born: 1925
- Died: 13 March 2012
- Occupations: Lecturer in mechanics, car restorer
- Known for: Restoration of antique cars, most notably Babs

Owen Wyn Owen (1925 – 13 March 2012) was a Welsh automobile restorer and mechanic. He lived in Capel Curig, Snowdonia. His working life was spent as a lecturer in engineering at Caernarfonshire Technical College in Bangor, but he is known for his outside achievements. He died in March 2012.

== Restoration of Babs ==
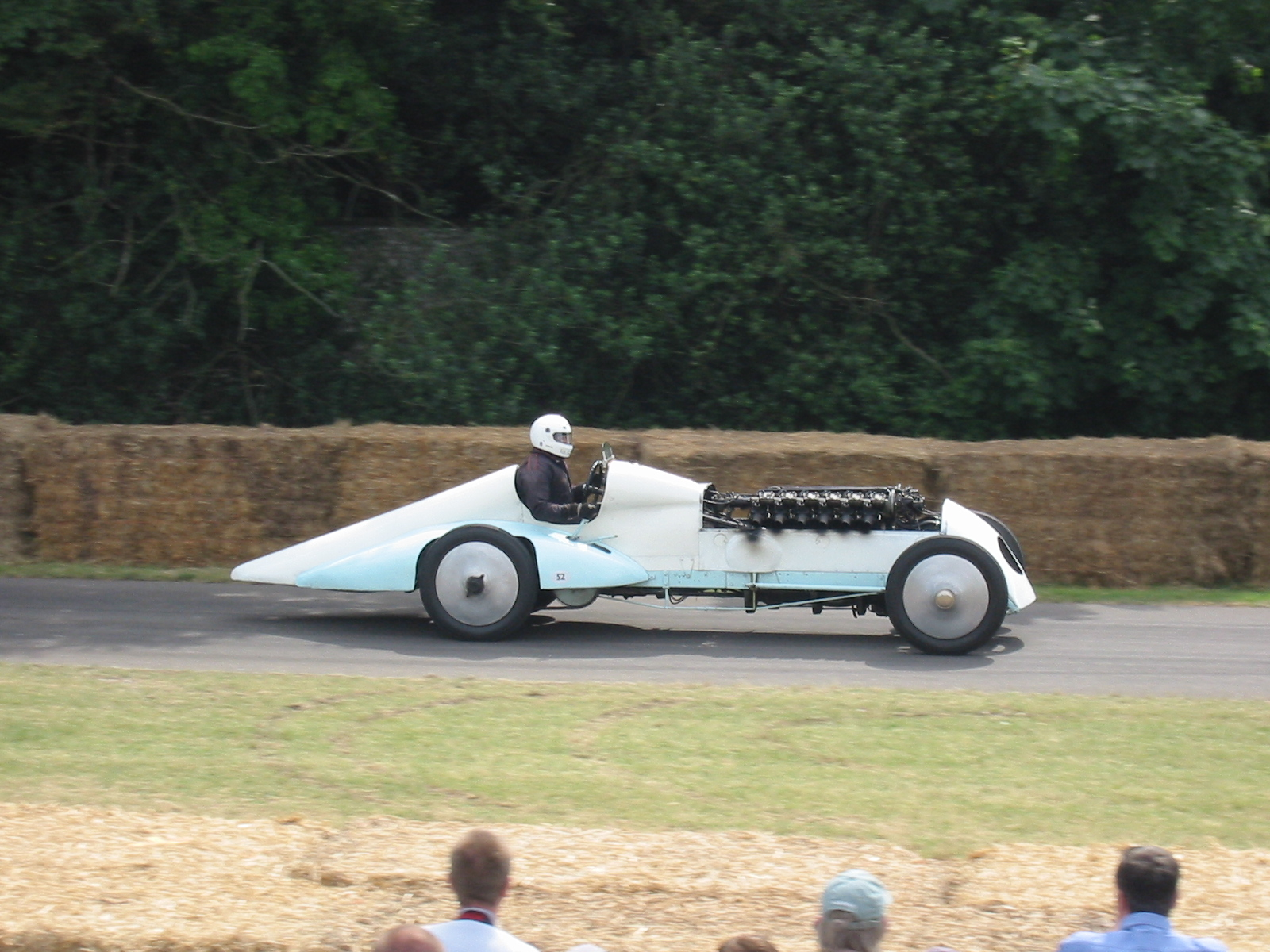
Babs, in 2005

His most famous restoration project, which received worldwide attention, was to excavate and restore Babs, after 40 years buried on a tidal beach. "Babs" was the car that in 1927, driven by J. G. Parry-Thomas, whilst attempting the land speed record at the time (180 mph or 290 km/h), crashed and killed the driver. The car was buried where the accident occurred on Pendine Sands.

In 1967, Wyn Owen decided to excavate and restore Babs. The car was first successfully tested on The Helyg straight in the early 1970s and was later successfully demonstrated in front of the world press and television on an air field near RAF Valley, Anglesey.

The restoration work took place in Owen's garage in Capel Curig, and Babs was displayed in the Pendine Museum of Speed during the summer months until its demolition in 2019. A replacement museum, the Museum of Land Speed, was opened at Pendine in 2022, and the car is displayed there for part of the year.

The car is owned by the Babs Trust.

In 1999, Owen was awarded the Tom Pryce trophy, engraved with the words Atgyfodwr Babs (English: Resurrector of Babs).
