= Church of St Margaret Marloes, Eglwyscummin =

Coordinates: 51°45′58″N 4°33′51″W

Church of St Margaret Marloes
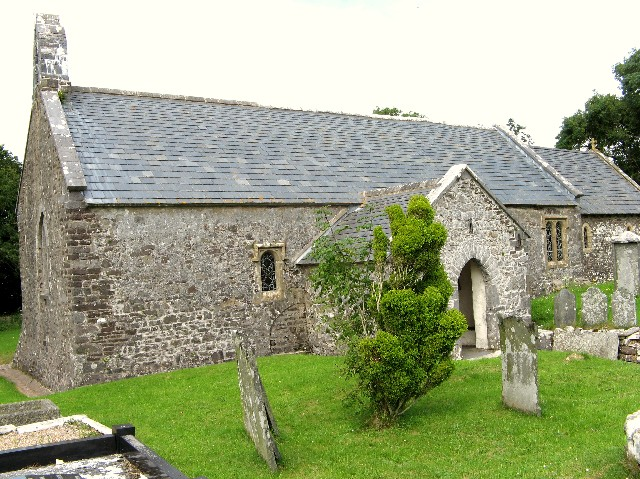
- Church of St Margaret Marloes
- Location: Eglwyscummin, Carmarthenshire
- Country: Wales
- Denomination: Anglican

History
- Founded: Medieval

Architecture
- Heritage designation: Grade I
- Designated: 30 November 1966
- Architectural type: Church

The Church of St Margaret Marloes is the Church in Wales parish church of the parish of Eglwyscummin, in south-western Carmarthenshire, Wales. The present building dates from the 14th and 15th centuries, with restoration work undertaken in 1878 and again in 1900. The church has a circular churchyard, indicating that the site has likely been in use since prehistoric times. A tombstone dating to the fifth century was found in the churchyard. It is believed that Saint Cynin founded the church as one of a series of missionary stations in the fifth century.

An Ogham stone was found in the churchyard prior to 1900. The stone's inscription is in Latin and Celtic, with the word "ingenia" substituted for the Latin "filia". This type of Ogham inscription was common in Ireland, but was the only example of its kind found outside Ireland at the time of its discovery.

The church is a small building set in a hollow. It was described as ruinous in 1710 and has a sprocketed eighteenth-century roof. There are good stained-glass windows, and a large carved oak altar and fittings dating from 1882. Margaret Marloes, to whom the church is dedicated, was the niece of Guy de Brian, Lord of Laugharne; a fourteenth-century effigy of her was brought into the church from the churchyard in 1902 as it was becoming badly eroded.

In 1900, this was a rural parish with a population of 240. The church was in need of immediate repair and lacked sufficient funds. The Society for the Protection of Ancient Buildings examined the building to estimate the cost of the necessary work. An appeal for restoration funds was made through the journal Archaeologia Cambrensis with the consent of the local bishop.

It was determined that the present structure dates to at least the thirteenth century. The lack of ornamentation made precise dating more difficult. During the examination, a small square opening in the north wall of the nave and a partially underground arch in the south wall were discovered, suggesting that an earlier structure may lie beneath the present church. The repairs were completed in 1901.

The church was designated a Grade I listed building on 30 November 1966, as an example of "an excellent small medieval church with vaulted nave and porch; a notable example of an Arts and Crafts restoration associated with Philip Webb and with exceptional interior fittings and stained glass". The cross in the churchyard became a Grade II listed building on 1 December 2001.

== Bibliography ==
- "Appeal for Funds for the Repair of Eglys-Cummin Church, Carmarthenshire". Archaeologia Cambrensis. W. Pickering. 1900. hdl:2027/uc1.a0002761872.
- "Church Renovation in St. David's Diocese". The Church of England Pulpit, and Ecclesiastical Review. S.J. Wells. 1901. hdl:2027/uiug.30112028229026.
- Thomas, Lloyd; Ohrbach, Julian; Scourfield, Robert (2006). Carmarthenshire and Ceredigion. Yale University Press. ISBN 0-300-10179-1.
