= Eglwyscummin =

Community in Carmarthenshire, Wales

Eglwyscummin: Welsh: Eglwys Gymyn
- Community
- Location within Carmarthenshire
- Population: 432 (2011)
- OS grid reference: SN230106
- Community: Eglwyscummin
- Principal area: Carmarthenshire
- Preserved county: Dyfed
- Country: Wales
- Sovereign state: United Kingdom
- Post town: Whitland
- Postcode district: SA34
- Dialling code: 01834; 01994
- Police: Dyfed-Powys
- Fire: Mid and West Wales
- Ambulance: Welsh
- UK Parliament: Caerfyrddin
- Senedd Cymru – Welsh Parliament: Carmarthen West and South Pembrokeshire
- List of places UK Wales Carmarthenshire 51.766°N 4.566°W Map of the community

Eglwyscummin (Welsh: Eglwys Gymyn) is a community situated on the south-western boundary of Carmarthenshire in south-west Wales. It is made up of the three ward parishes of Ciffig, Eglwyscummin, and Marros, all surrounding the village of Red Roses, which lies some three miles south of Whitland and forms part of the Laugharne Township electoral ward.

The area consists mostly of farmland and is traversed from east to west by the main A477 road leading to south Pembrokeshire and the Pembroke Dock ferry port, crossed at Red Roses by the B4314 running southeastwards from the county boundary at Tavernspite to the seaside resort of Pendine Sands.

== Administration ==
Carmarthenshire County Council administers the area with Eglwyscummin Community Council providing some local direction. Eglwyscummin Community Association has, on occasion, been responsible for providing a more open forum for general members of the Community. So too had The Taf Myrddin Community Network which provided a direct interface between the County Council Executive and the general public. Although successful, the Network was ended by the County Council in early 2009.

== Places ==
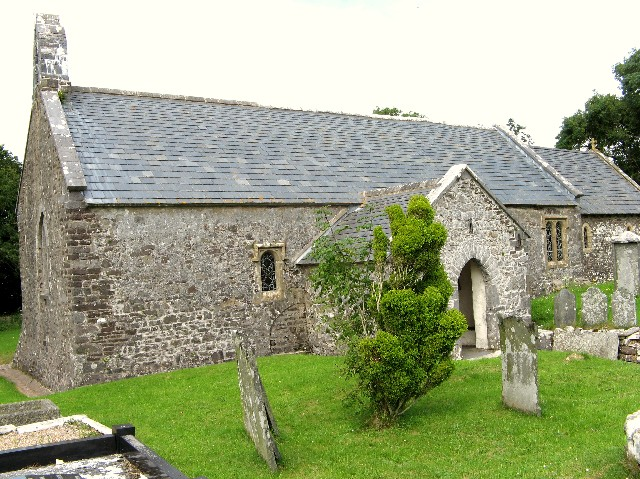
St Margaret Marloes parish church

Places of worship include Ciffig parish church, the grade I listed parish church of St Margaret Marloes and St. Lawrence's parish church in Marros.

Eglwyscummin Community Centre opened on 1 March 2008 and is situated in Red Roses with a Memorial Garden adjacent which was built by members of the local Young Farmers Group.

Apart from the local farms, other businesses in the area include a horse riding centre, a farm with a shooting range that also serves Sunday lunch, several caravan parks, holiday cottages for the disabled, a bus / coach company, a farm with a pizzeria that also produces its own ice cream, a National and local league Autograss track, the Green Bridge Inn (Marros) and Sporting Chance (Red Roses) public houses.

The community lies on the northern shore of Carmarthen Bay. It is bordered by the communities of Amroth and Lampeter Velfrey in Pembrokeshire; and by: Whitland; Llanboidy; St Clears; Llanddowror; and Pendine, all being in Carmarthenshire.

== History ==
The English translation from the Welsh name Eglwyscummin is "church community" although the name derived from the Celtic saint Cynin. There were five churches within the district but currently now only three remain in use with St Cyffig's Church now taking services again after maintenance work was carried out during 2006–07. The Gothic Revival architect C.C. Rolfe restored St. Margaret's parish church in 1878. Some history of the area can be found here.

Eglwyscummin is the only known place where an Ogham inscription commemorates a woman, Avitoriges, daughter of Cunigni.

== Development ==
Plans for a by-pass route to take over from the poorly rated, accident-ridden route between Llanddowror and Red Roses on the A477 had been announced by the Welsh Assembly to take place from 2010 but was delayed. Work eventually started during 2012 and the by-pass was opened on 16 April 2014.

== Sources ==
- Lloyd, Thomas (2006). The Buildings of Wales: Carmarthenshire and Ceredigion. ISBN 0-300-10179-1.
- Saint, Andrew (1970). "Three Oxford Architects". Oxoniensia. XXXV. Oxfordshire Architectural and Historical Society: 53 ff. Archived from the original on 28 September 2007.
