= Bridget Bevan =

Welsh philanthropist (1698–1779)

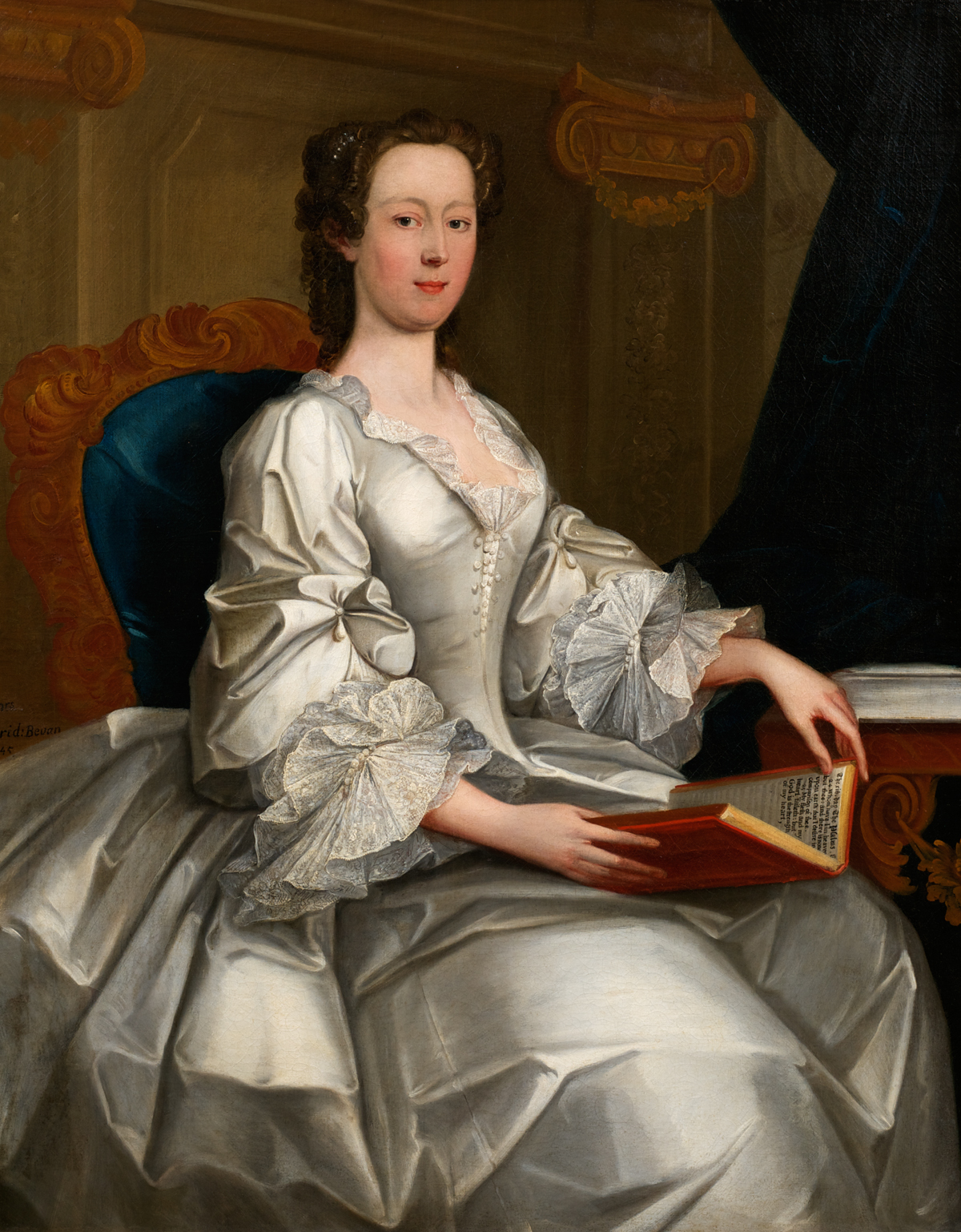
- Portrait of Madam Bevan by John Lewis, 1745 (oils) from original in the Carmarthenshire County Museum
- Born: Bridget Vaughan; October 1698; Llannewydd in Carmarthenshire
- Died: 11 December 1779 (aged 81); Laugharne, Carmarthenshire
- Occupation: Philanthropist
- Spouse: Arthur Bevan

Bridget Bevan (née Vaughan; baptised 30 October 1698 – 11 December 1779), also known as Madam Bevan, was a Welsh educationalist and public benefactor. She was the chief supporter of Griffith Jones and his system of circulating schools.

== Life ==
Bridget Bevan was born at Derllys Court, Llannewydd, in Carmarthenshire, Wales, in 1698. She was the youngest daughter of the philanthropist John Vaughan (1663–1722), a patron of the Society for the Promotion of Christian Knowledge (SPCK) schools in the county, and his wife, Elizabeth Thomas (died 1721). On 30 December 1721 at Merthyr church, she married a local lawyer and Member of Parliament for Carmarthen, Arthur Bevan (1689–1743). She was the heiress of her uncle, John Vaughan of Derllys.

She followed her father's interest in philanthropy. In 1731, she financially supported the rector at Llanddowror, Carmarthenshire, Griffith Jones, to establish an experimental school. This developed into the Circulating Welsh Charity School system, which moved from village to village and fostered education for children and adults throughout Wales. The education was given in the Welsh language. Much of Madam Bevan's considerable wealth poured into these free schools. After Jones' wife died in 1755, he moved in with Bevan; after his death in 1761, she assumed management of the project. During the following eighteen years she displayed considerable business acumen and organizational skills. Between 1736 and 1776, 6,321 schools were founded and 304,475 scholars, both adults and children, taught. It is estimated that at this time half the population of Wales had attended a circulating school, and the nation achieved one of the highest literacy rates in Europe. By 1764 news of the success of this educational initiative had reached the ears of Catherine the Great of Russia, who ordered her ministers to make enquiries about the scheme.

She died at Laugharne, Carmarthenshire in 1779, and left £10,000 of her wealth to the schools. Admiral William Lloyd, however, disputed her will and the case went into Chancery, where it remained for a period of thirty years, and grew to over £30,000. In 1804 the money was released and devoted to the educational purposes intended by Mrs. Bevan.

In 1854 the schools were absorbed into the system of the National Society, effectively ending the system of circulating schools that she had fostered.
