= Redberth =

Village, parish and community in Pembrokeshire, Wales

Coordinates: 51.70354°N 4.77673°W

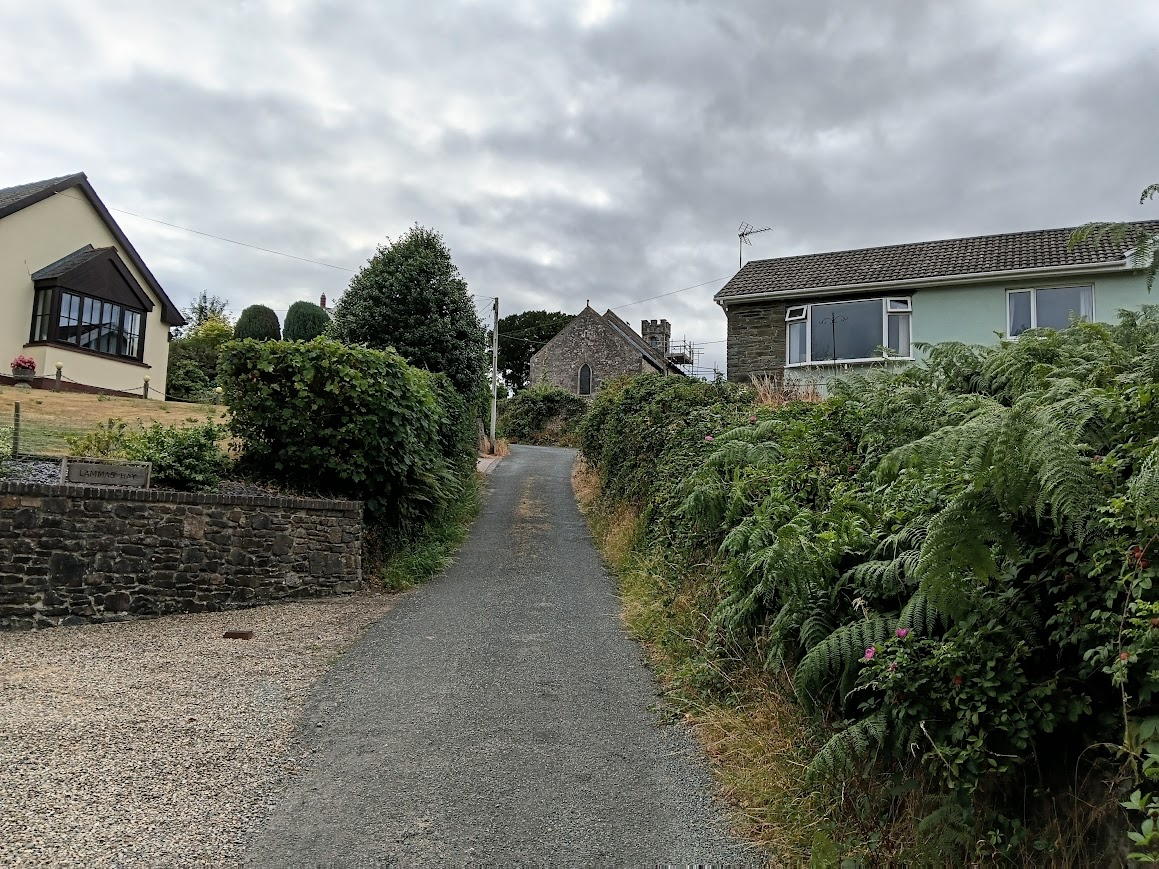
- St. Mary's Church and surrounding houses

- Location within Pembrokeshire
- OS grid reference: SN 08227 04183
- Community: Carew
- Principal area: Pembrokeshire
- Country: Wales
- Sovereign state: United Kingdom
- Post town: PEMBROKE
- Postcode district: SA70
- Police: Dyfed-Powys
- Fire: Mid and West Wales
- Ambulance: Welsh
- UK Parliament: Mid and South Pembrokeshire
- Senedd Cymru – Welsh Parliament: Ceredigion Penfro

Redberth is a village in the community of Carew, in the county of Pembrokeshire in the south-west of Wales.

== Geography ==
Redberth is two miles east of Sageston and Carew, three miles east of Milton, three miles west of Saundersfoot, and five miles from Tenby. The A477 road passed through the village until 2002, when the Sageston-Redberth bypass was completed.

== History ==
The name Redberth is thought to have been derived from the words 'rhyd' and 'y berth', meaning 'ford by the bush', referring to the ford on the Carew River on which Redberth lies.

Redberth was a manor of the baronry of Carew, and was given to the Knights Hospitaller by a Norman lord. The village was a planned village, surrounded by open fields and common land. In the eighteenth century, Redberth was largely owned by the Barlow family of Lawrenny, but by the mid-nineteenth century the land was divided between nine people. The highest population in over a century was recorded in 1851, largely due to the number of travellers regularly staying in the village.

Occupations in Redberth in the nineteenth century included coal mining, due to Redberth being at the edge of the Pembrokeshire Coalfield, as well as blacksmithing and shoemaking. During and following World War II, new machinery enabled more efficient farming in the village.

== Education ==
Redberth School was founded in 1842, was re-built in 1853 and closed in 1953. The school building is now a private house.

== Religious sites ==
St. Mary's church is present in the village. The church underwent major repair works in the 1830s, completed in 1841, and has a small west tower, a nave and a chancel. Redberth Community Choir was formed in 2023 and meet in the church building.

A Methodist chapel previously existed in the village, which was opened in 1822. The chapel was closed in 1985 and is now a private house.
