= Llannewydd =

Village in Carmarthenshire, Wales

Coordinates: 51.898°N 4.340°W

Llannewydd or Newchurch is a parish in Carmarthenshire, Wales. It is 3 miles (5 km) north of Carmarthen on the banks of the Gwili. The church was rebuilt in 1829. It is in the community of Newchurch and Merthyr.

== Notable people ==
Bridget Vaughan (1698–1779), philanthropist and the chief supporter of Griffith Jones and his system of circulating schools. She was also known as Madam Bevan.
