= Neyland =

Town and community in Pembrokeshire, Wales

- Town
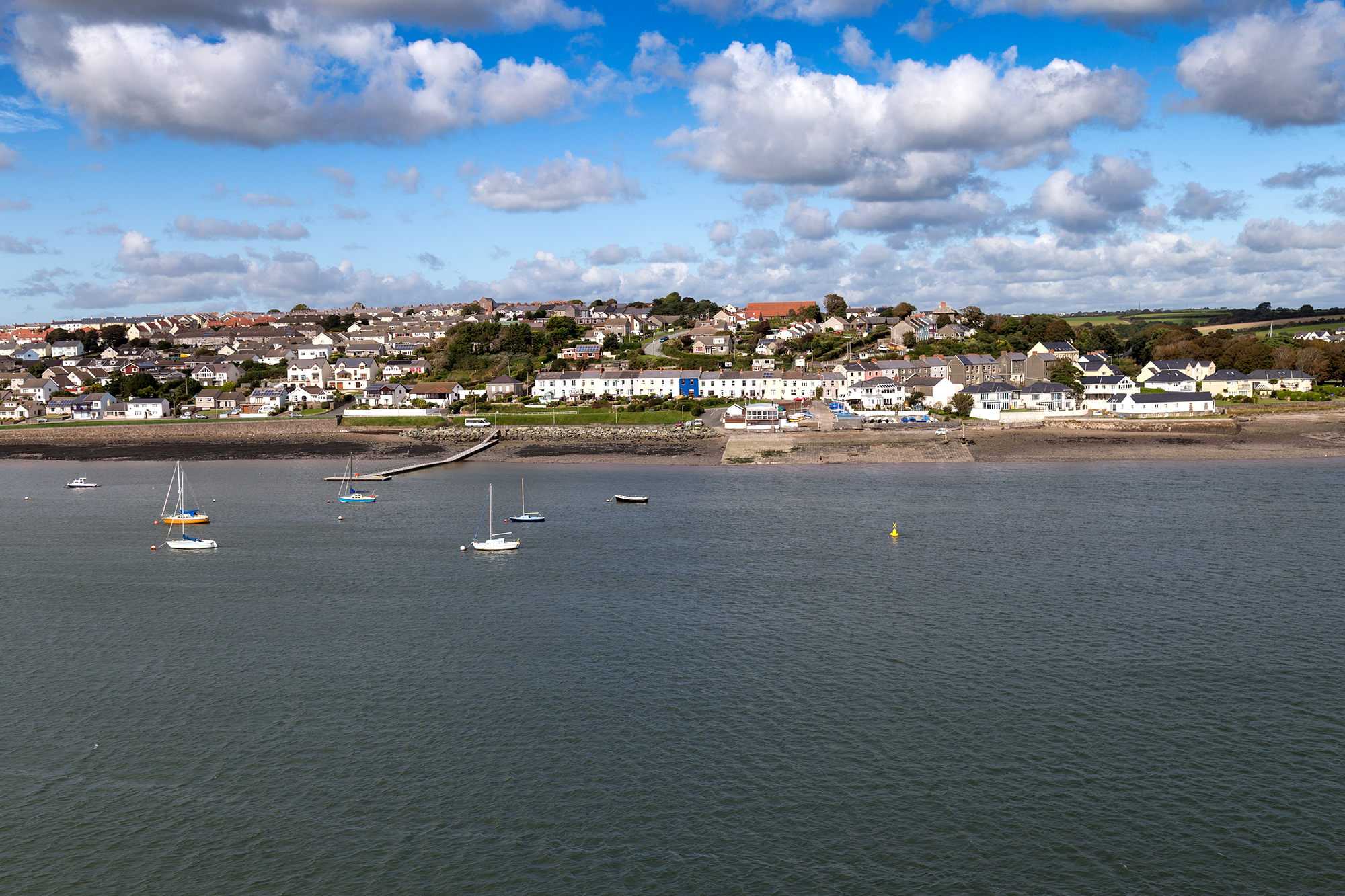
- View of Neyland

- Location within Pembrokeshire
- Population: 3,464 (2011 census)
- OS grid reference: SM965055
- Community: Neyland
- Principal area: Pembrokeshire
- Preserved county: Dyfed
- Country: Wales
- Sovereign state: United Kingdom
- Post town: MILFORD HAVEN
- Postcode district: SA73
- Dialling code: 01646
- Police: Dyfed-Powys
- Fire: Mid and West Wales
- Ambulance: Welsh
- UK Parliament: Mid and South Pembrokeshire
- Senedd Cymru – Welsh Parliament: Ceredigion Penfro
- List of places UK Wales Pembrokeshire 51.711272°N 4.945231°W Map of the community

Neyland is a town and community in Pembrokeshire, Wales, lying on the River Cleddau and the upstream end of the Milford Haven estuary. The Cleddau Bridge carrying the A477 links Pembroke Dock with Neyland. In 2011 it had a population of 3,464.

== Toponymy ==
The name of the town is a reduction of an earlier form of the English word island preceded by the Middle English atten "at the". It was formerly known as New Milford by contrast with Milford Haven.

== History ==
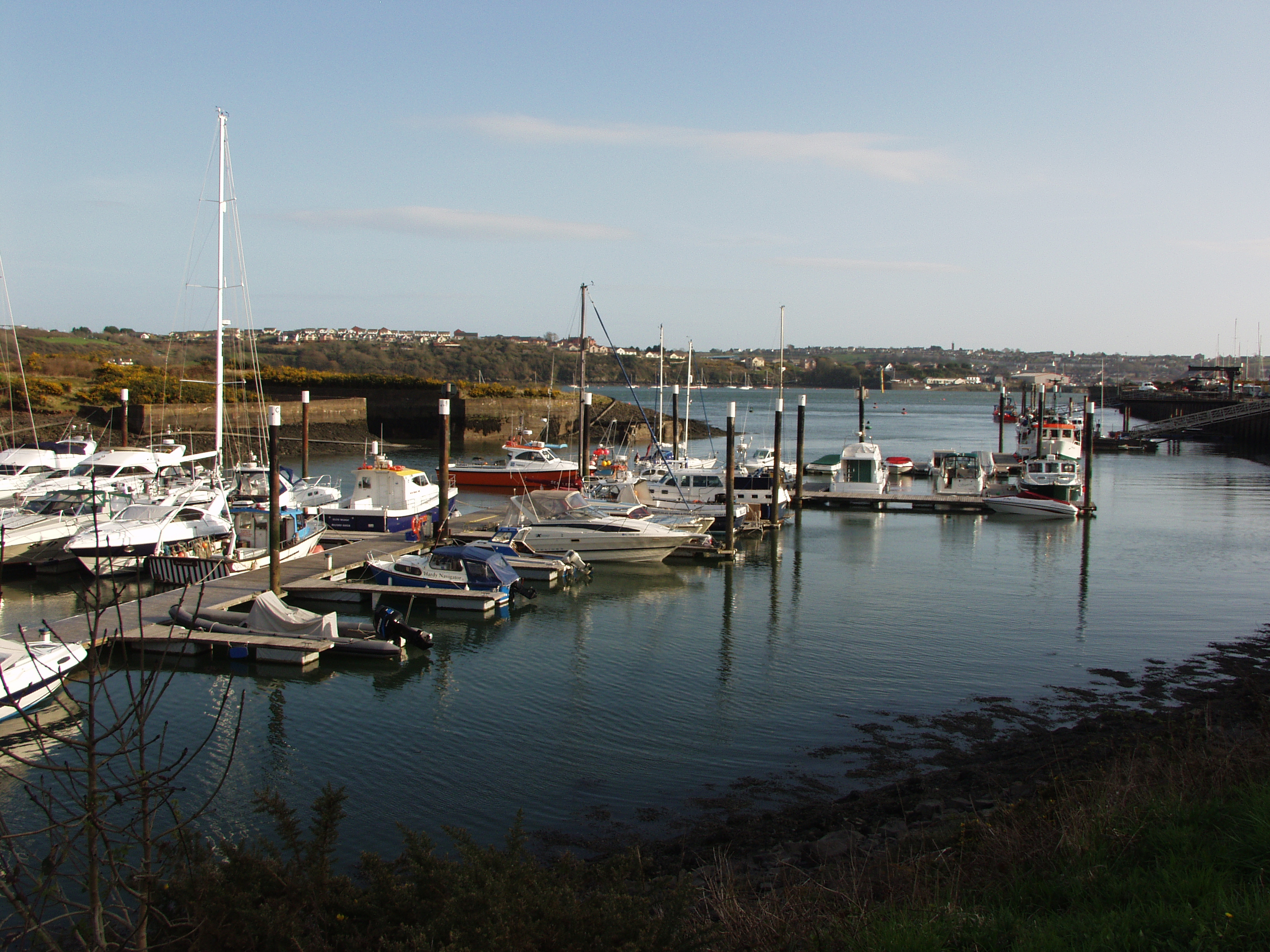
View of Neyland Marina looking out towards the Cleddau

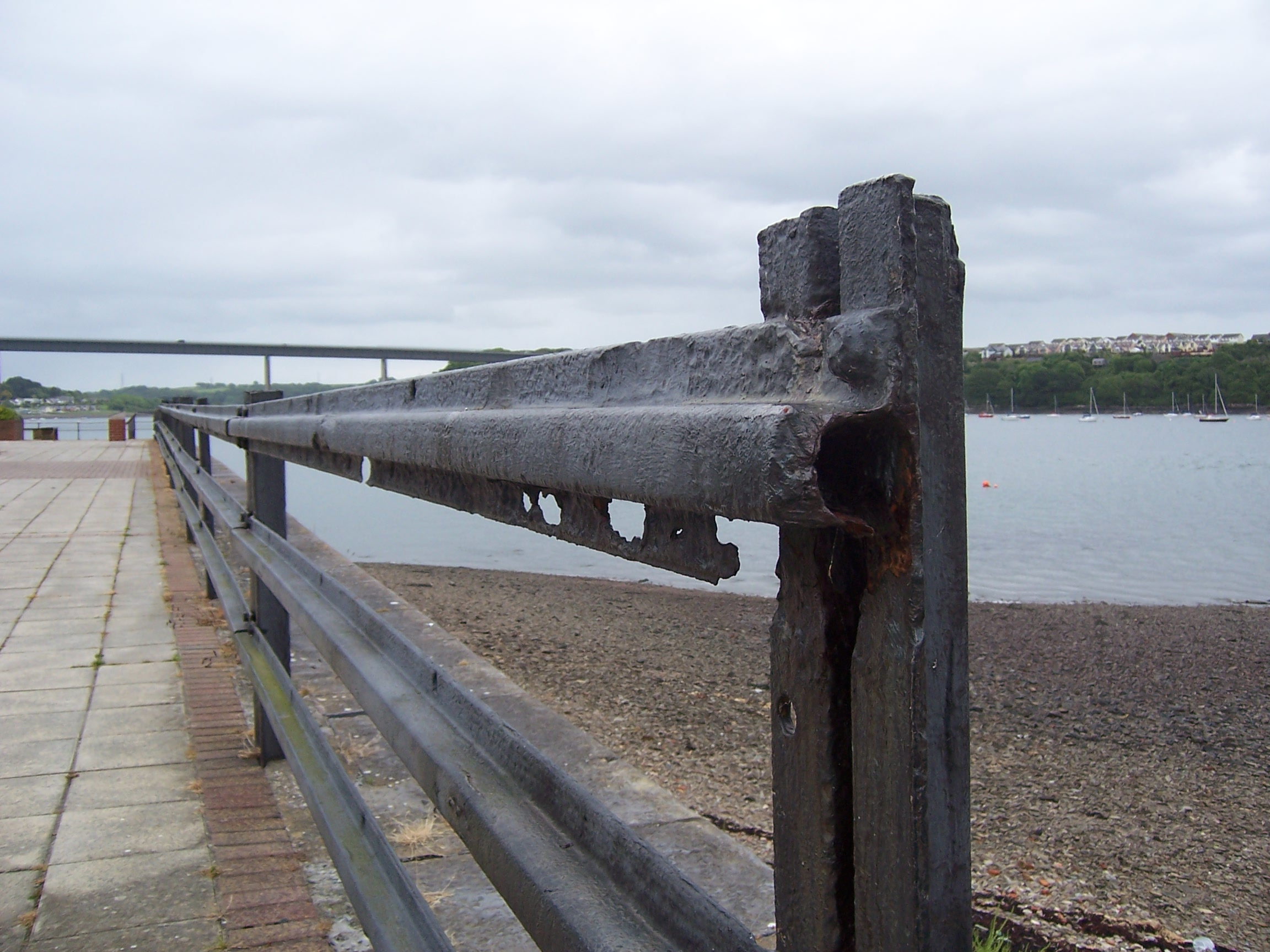
Original broad gauge rails used as safety barriers at Neyland

Neyland was a small fishing village in the parish of Llanstadwell, but in 1856 it became the site for the western terminus of Isambard Kingdom Brunel's Great Western Railway with a transatlantic terminal for the largest ships of the time. It was selected instead of the other possible location Abermawr. The town then grew rapidly to serve the port.

The construction of a more substantial port at Goodwick near the north Pembrokeshire town of Fishguard based on an earlier plan of 1846, was revived in 1899, and opened in 1906. Many people relocated from Neyland to Goodwick and Fishguard at that time. Neyland was partially reprieved because silting of Goodwick harbour restricted its use, and for a little over one hundred years, Neyland was a busy rail and sea port. The Neyland terminal ceased operation in 1964.

The rail terminus used to link with the ferry that crossed the Cleddau to Hobbs Point in Pembroke Dock until 1975 when the Cleddau Bridge opened. The redevelopment of the 1980s saw the creation of a new marina and rehabilitation of the old railway yard. Some of the original Brunel iron wide gauge railway tracks can be seen today in use as safety barriers around the quay.

In August 2010, an 8 ft bronze statue of Brunel was stolen from its site in the town's marina, presumably for its metallurgic value. It was later replaced by a copper statue that has oxidised and has an iconic green colour.

== Governance ==
There are two tiers of local government covering Neyland, at community (town) and county level: Neyland Town Council and Pembrokeshire County Council. The town council is based at the Community Hub on John Street, which opened in 2020.

Until 1900, Neyland was part of the parish of Llanstadwell. When parish and district councils were established in 1894, the parish of Llanstadwell was included in the Pembroke Rural District. On 1 October 1900 a parish of Neyland was created from part of Llanstadwell, and the new parish was declared to be an urban district, making it independent from the Pembroke Rural District Council. Neyland Urban District Council held its first meeting on 15 October 1900 at the town's board school, when Anthony James, a Liberal, was appointed the first chairman of the council. The urban district council later acquired premises at 60–62 High Street in the mid 1960s, which then served as a town hall until 2018.

Neyland Urban District was abolished under the Local Government Act 1972, with the area becoming part of Preseli Pembrokeshire in 1974. Preseli Pembrokeshire in turn was abolished in 1996 to become part of a re-established Pembrokeshire.

== Sport and leisure ==
Sporting groups include Neyland Cricket Club (a founder member of the Pembroke County Cricket Club) established in 1889, Neyland RFC (a rugby union club established in 1885) and Neyland AFC. The town has a yacht club and a marina. The Pembrokeshire Coast National Park is nearby.

== Public services ==
Potable water is supplied to the town by Dŵr Cymru Welsh Water (DCWW). There were gas works alongside the railway. In 1909 it was the site of an explosion which burnt to death a mother and her three-year-old daughter who was taken there to inhale the fumes for the benefit of her health.

== Notable people ==
- Lord Gordon Parry of Neyland (1925–2004), Labour politician
- Sarah Waters (born 1966), novelist, Tipping the Velvet
- Barry John (born ca. 1974), artist, soldier
