= A477 road =

Road in the United Kingdom

A477

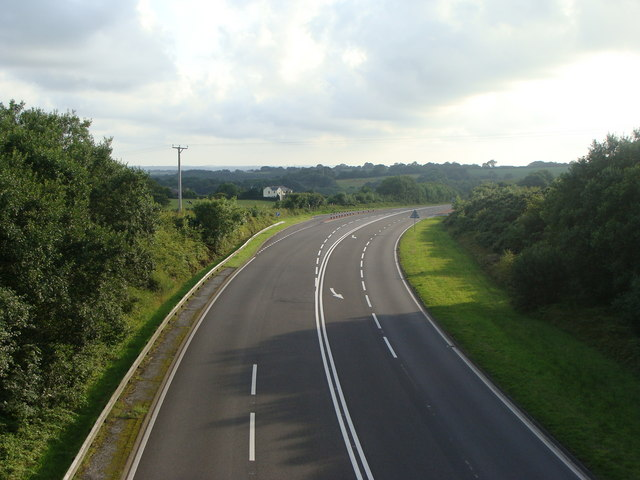
- The A477 near Kilgetty

Route information
- Length: 27.8 mi (44.7 km)

Major junctions
- East end: St Clears; 51.8163°N 4.5049°W
- A40 A478 A4075 A4076
- West end: Johnston; 51.7508°N 5.0016°W

Location
- Country: United Kingdom
- Primary destinations: St Clears; Pembroke Dock

Road network
- Roads in the United Kingdom; Motorways; A and B road zones

The A477 is a major road in South Pembrokeshire and Carmarthenshire connecting St Clears and Johnston. Its route includes the Cleddau Bridge, a former toll bridge linking Pembroke Dock and Neyland.

From the A40 in St Clears, the A477 is a trunk road with primary status as far as the Waterloo roundabout in Pembroke Dock, on the southeast side of the Milford Haven Waterway. Responsibility for the management and maintenance of this section lies with the South Wales Trunk Road Agent on behalf of the Welsh Government. From there the responsibility for maintaining the A477 is held by Pembrokeshire County Council.

== History ==
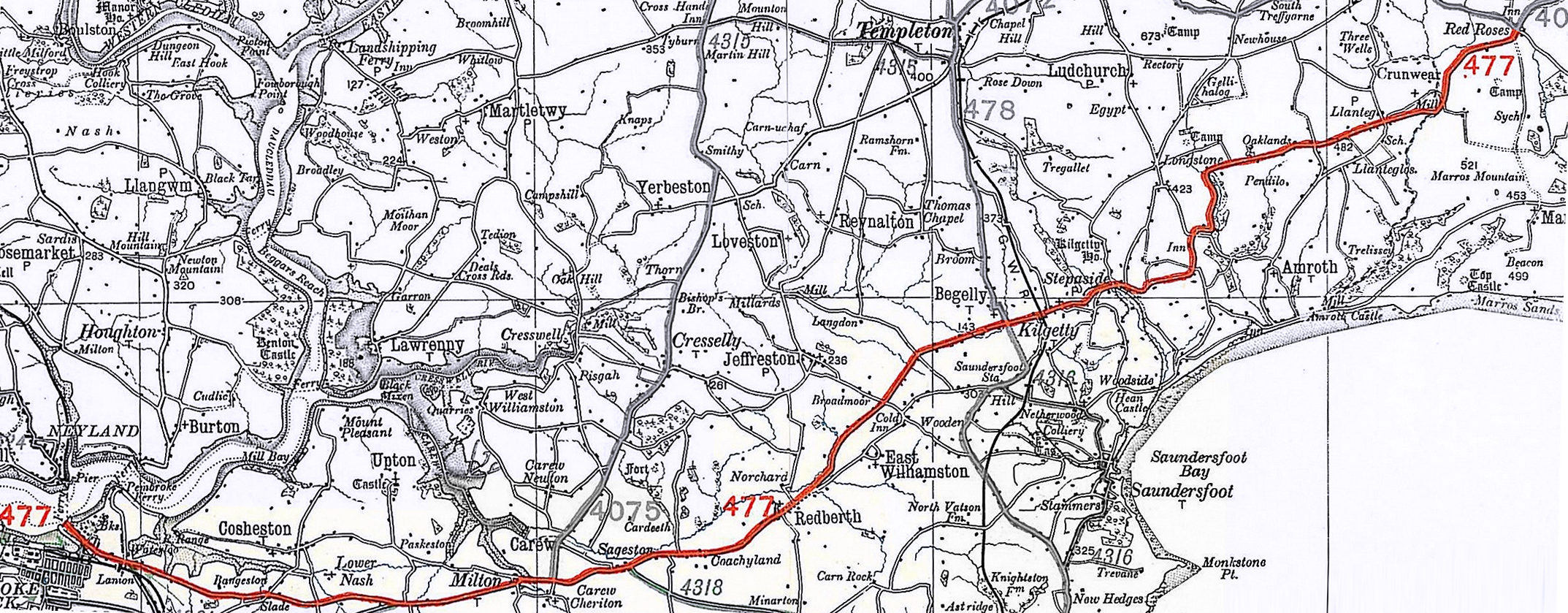
Original route of the A477 between Pembroke Dock and Red Roses(1923)

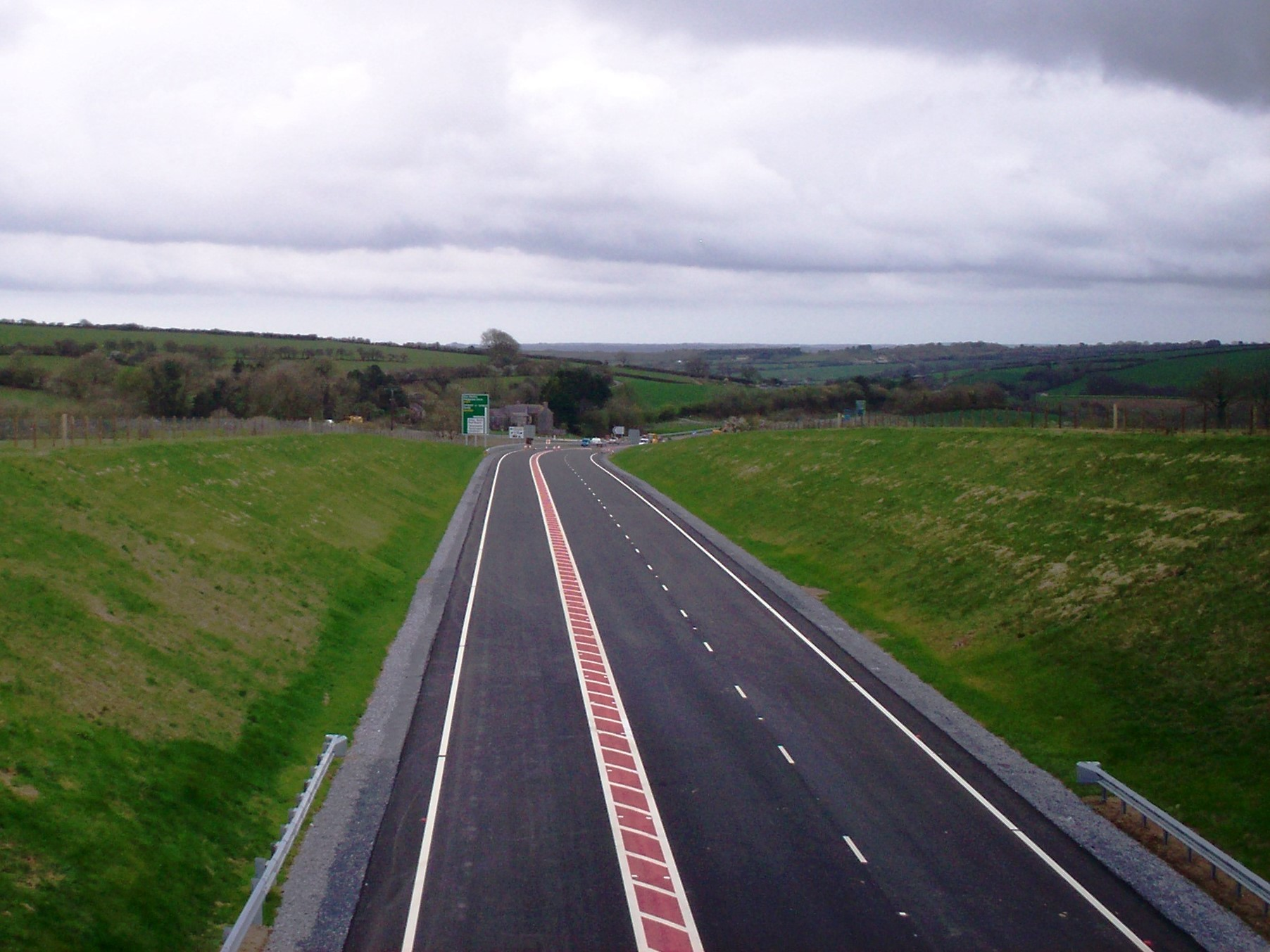
Red Roses bypass - looking west

A route from St Clears to Pembroke Dock was first surveyed by Thomas Telford in 1826, as part of a review of the route of the mail service from London to Ireland that at the time went via the docks at Milford Haven. A decision was taken in 1827 to move the mail port from Milford Haven to Hobbs Point in Pembroke Dock, and to pursue the access route from St Clears to Pembroke Dock. By 1830, a section of the road between the villages of Llanddowror and Red Roses had been completed. A levy on mail passing through Milford was introduced by the Postage Act 1836, to be used to fund the new route. The full route was completed in 1839, running from St Clears via Llanddowror, Red Roses, Llanteg, Begelly and Carew to Pembroke Dock.

Road designations were first allocated by the Ministry of Transport in 1922 with the road between Red Roses and Pembroke Dock being designated the A477. The section between St Clears and Red Roses, which was originally part of the A40, was redesignated the A477 by the early 1930s. (Note: The 1924-25 Ordnance Survey MoT map still shows the St.Clears-Red Roses section as part of the A40. By the 1932 Ordnance Survey Ten Mile map, it is part of the A477.)

The 22-mile section of the road from its start at St Clears as far as Nash—which is a convenient distribution point for places on the south side of Milford Haven—was promoted to a trunk road following an announcement by the (then) Secretary of State for Wales, Cledwyn Hughes, on 14 November 1966. A further 2 3/4 miles (4.4 km) from Nash to Waterloo roundabout in Pembroke Dock were upgraded to trunk road in 1982.

By 1968, the B4324 road between Johnston and the quay in Neyland had been renumbered to be part of the A477. (Note: The Ordnance Survey Route Planning map from July 1967 still shows the B4324. By the July 1968 map, it is part of the A477.) The end of the new section was joined to the existing A477 by a ferry crossing across the River Cleddau, with a project underway to construct a bridge to replace the ferry.

The Cleddau Bridge opened in March 1975 and as a result, the route of the A477 was diverted at Waterloo in Pembroke Dock to cross the bridge, rejoining the existing road at Honeyborough to the north of Neyland. The section from Waterloo to Hobbs Point in Pembroke Dock was renumbered to be part of the A4139, the section from the quay at Neyland to Honeyborough was joined onto the B4325.

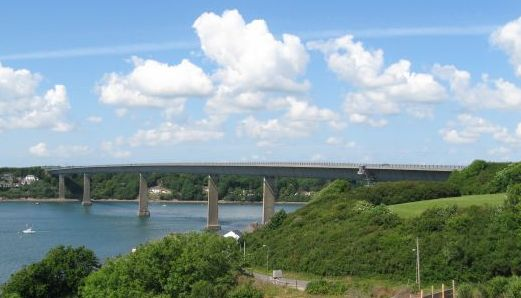
The Cleddau Bridge became operational during 1975

The Kilgetty-Begelly bypass was completed in 1984 at a cost of £14.2 million. The Sageston-Redberth bypass was completed in 2002 at a cost of £6.4 million. A new bypass improvement scheme for the section of the A477 between St Clears and Red Roses was approved by the Welsh Government on 27 January 2012. Construction work on the new bypass began in mid 2012. Constructed with a straighter alignment and bypassing the villages of Red Roses and Llanddowror, the new section was scheduled to open during May 2014 but opened to general traffic at around 12:25 pm on 16 April 2014 having previously been declared open earlier in the day by Edwina Hart, Welsh Assembly Member for Transport.

== Route ==
The A477 starts with a roundabout at the end of the A40 St Clears bypass. The roundabout marks the end of the dual carriageway route from London. The A477, 28 miles (45 km) in length, runs from east to west, either through, near or over:

- St Clears
- over the River Taf
- Llanddowror
- Red Roses
- Llanteg
- Kilgetty
- Redberth
- Sageston
- Carew
- Milton
- Slade Cross
- Pembroke Dock
- over the Cleddau Bridge
- Neyland
- Johnston

=== Toll charges ===
History of toll charges
Year	Cars & vans	Heavy vehicles
1975	30p	60p
1979	35p	70p
1985	50p	£1.00
1993	75p	£1.50
2019	—	—

The Cleddau Bridge was funded by tolls which are collected at Pembroke Dock from traffic in both directions. Pedestrians and cyclists are free of charge.

They were, from 1993 until 2019, 35p for motorcycles, 75p for cars, £1.50 for heavy vehicles. Car drivers could also buy books of 20 or 50 bridge tickets which reduced the cost to 60p per crossing. The toll booths only accepted cash or the pre-purchased tickets. Toll booths with barriers were introduced in September 2004 to reduce the number of vehicles driving through without paying.

A review was carried out in early 2016, when Pembrokeshire County Councillors voted that all toll charges would remain unchanged and would not be abolished. In October 2018, the County Council and the Welsh Assembly Government agree to abolish tolls on the Cleddau Bridge from April 2019; the tolls were closed at 2 pm GMT on 28 March 2019.

== See also ==
- British road numbering scheme
- Trunk roads in Wales
