= Pendine =

Coastal village in Carmarthenshire, Wales

Coordinates: 51.74719°N 4.56393°W

- Village and community
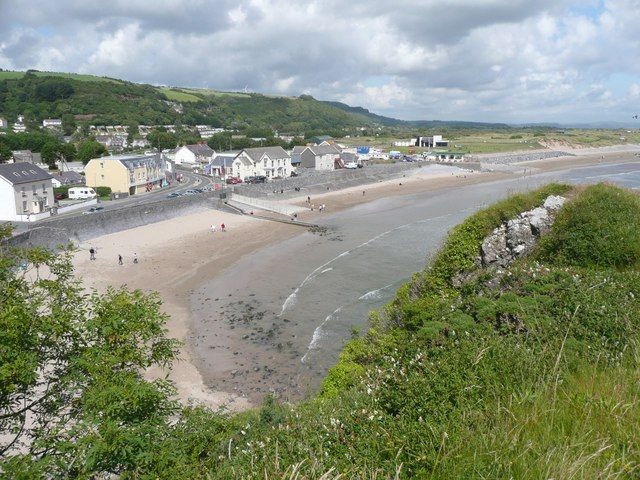
- Pendine seafront with village behind and uphill showing the start of Pendine Sands to right
- Principal area: Carmarthenshire
- Country: Wales
- Sovereign state: United Kingdom
- Police: Dyfed-Powys
- Fire: Mid and West Wales
- Ambulance: Welsh
- List of places UK Wales Carmarthenshire Map of the community

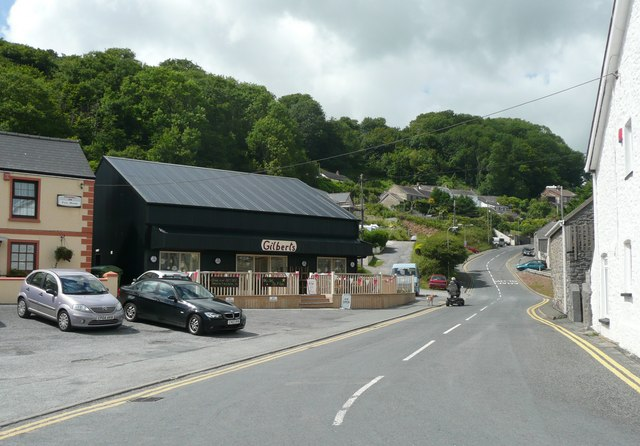
The road leading from seafront up to the village

Pendine (Welsh: Pentywyn, "end of the dunes") is a village and community in Carmarthenshire, Wales. Situated on the northern shore of Carmarthen Bay and bordered by the communities of Eglwyscummin and Llanddowror, the population at the 2011 census was 346.

There are two parts of the village: the old hill-top settlement around the parish church; and the small harbour settlement on the shore. The latter developed into a small seaside resort during the 20th century. The seaside resort is best known for adjacent Pendine Sands.

== Development ==
In 2016 Carmarthenshire County Council completed construction of a new building on the Pendine promenade. It was named the Parry Thomas Centre and contains five commercial premises and public toilets.

In 2019 construction began on the next stage of the Pendine Tourism Attractor Project, creating an eco activity resort, including a hostel with Passivhaus certification. The Museum of Speed was demolished in 2019 and will be replaced in the new development by the Sands of Speed Museum.

== Demographics ==
Pendine community's population was 346, according to the 2011 census; a 1.4% decrease since the 351 people noted in 2001. The community, which covers an area of 409 hectares (1.58 mi^{2}), lies a few miles south of the linguistic boundary known as the Landsker line, and is predominantly English-speaking. The 2011 census showed 18.2% of the population could speak Welsh, a rise from 13.9% in 2001.

== The beach ==
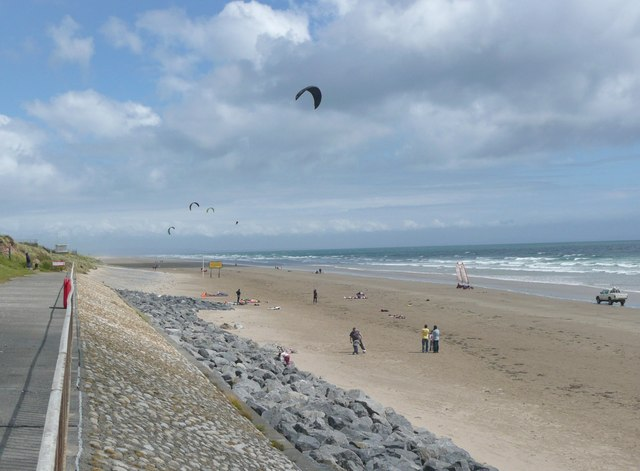
Pendine Sands (2008)

Malcolm Campbell and J. G. Parry-Thomas set the world land speed record five times between 1924 and 1927. Parry-Thomas was killed while making a final record-breaking attempt on Pendine Sands in 1927. For part of the summer the Pendine Museum of Speed has, Parry-Thomas' restored car Babs on display. Carmarthenshire Land Sailing Club is allowed to use the beach for wind-traction activities, including land sailing, kite buggying and kite landboarding.

Cars were banned from the beach between 2005 and 2010 but are now permitted. The BBC's Top Gear have thrice test-driven on the sands.

== MOD Pendine ==
MOD Pendine is a military range operated by the defence technology company QinetiQ for weapons testing, evaluation and training. The range occupies 20.5 square kilometres (7.9 sq mi) with 9 kilometres (5.6 mi) of shoreline and a sea danger area of 18 square kilometres (6.9 sq mi). The range includes three test tracks.

Part of the beach is classified as a land danger area and is sometimes cordoned off when the range is active.
