= Red Roses =

Coordinates: 51°47′N 4°36′W

Red Roses: Welsh: Rhos-goch
- Village
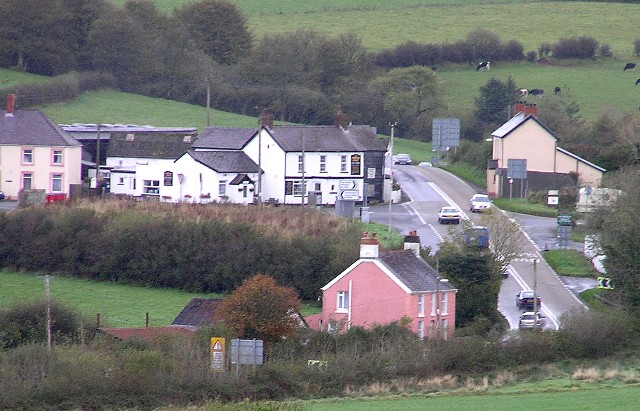
- Red Roses from the southwest

- Location within Carmarthenshire
- OS grid reference: SN203117
- Community: Eglwyscummin
- Principal area: Carmarthenshire
- Preserved county: Dyfed
- Country: Wales
- Sovereign state: United Kingdom
- Post town: Whitland
- Postcode district: SA34
- Dialling code: 01834
- Police: Dyfed-Powys
- Fire: Mid and West Wales
- Ambulance: Welsh
- UK Parliament: Caerfyrddin
- Senedd Cymru – Welsh Parliament: Carmarthen West and South Pembrokeshire

Red Roses (Welsh: Rhos-goch, 'red moor') is a village in Carmarthenshire, Wales.

Situated in south-west Carmarthenshire, the village forms part of the Eglwyscummin community, and with Ciffig and Marros, forms part of the Laugharne Township electoral ward.

The A477 trunk road, the main route to south Pembrokeshire from the A40 used to run through the centre of the village; the bypass to the north of the village was opened in April 2014. The village centre is at the crossroads of the previous A477 and the B4314.

The village community centre was built in 2008, occupying where a Methodist Chapel had been.

Surrounded by farmland, the village is near a number of holiday destinations and has two holiday parks; one for static caravans and one for touring caravans. The economy is largely dependent on farming and tourism.

Public transport is sparse with the main bus service being the 224 Whitland to Carmarthen service. Three other services offer an early morning pick up and evening set down service run Monday to Saturday on their way to their main start point of Pendine Sands or Kilgetty; these are the 222 (not timetabled), 351 and 352 which also runs a Sunday service. All buses are run by Taf Valley Coaches based in Ciffig. A popular Monday to Saturday 333 service from Pembroke Dock to Carmarthen via Tenby service that used to serve the village was first cut to a two-day service during November 2008 before being taken off service a few years later. The nearest railway station is Whitland.

The village pub, the Sporting Chance, which used to be the Llwyngwair Arms, previously closed during March 2014, reopened under new ownership on 15 December 2017.
