= Urban Chipmunk =

Studio album by Alvin and the Chipmunks
- Released: February 4, 1981 (US)
- Recorded: December 1980–January 1981
- Studio: Sound Emporium (Nashville, Tennessee)
- Genre: Country, children's music
- Length: 45:23
- Label: RCA Nashville
- Producer: Larry Butler; Janice Karman; Ross Bagdasarian

Alvin and the Chipmunks chronology
Chipmunk Punk (1980)	Urban Chipmunk (1981)	A Chipmunk Christmas (1981)

Singles from Urban Chipmunk
- 1. "Lunchbox (feat. Jerry Reed)" Released: 1981

Alternate cover
- 1993 Remaster cover art

Professional ratings
Review scores
Source	Rating
Allmusic	2.5/5 stars
Stereo Review	(favorable)
Philadelphia Daily News	(favorable)
The Philadelphia Inquirer	(unfavorable)
New York Daily News	(favorable)
Dayton Daily News	(favorable)
The Arizona Republic	(favorable)
Los Angeles Times	(unfavorable)
Richmond Times-Dispatch	(favorable)

Urban Chipmunk was the first country album by Alvin and the Chipmunks, released on February 4, 1981. The title parodies the 1980 movie Urban Cowboy.

== Track listing ==
=== Original 1981 release ===
Side one
No.	Title	Original Artist	Length
1.	"Thank God I'm a Country Boy" (John Martin Sommers)	John Denver	1:43
2.	"The Gambler" (Don Schlitz)	Bobby Bare	3:13
3.	"Lunchbox (feat. Jerry Reed)" (Albert Bouchard, Mike Diamond Sr.)	Jerry Reed	3:10
4.	"Luckenbach, Texas (Back to the Basics of Love)" (Chips Moman, Bobby Emmons)	Waylon Jennings	3:05
5.	"(Hey Won't You Play) Another Somebody Done Somebody Wrong Song (feat. Larry Butler)" (Larry Butler, Chips Moman)	B. J. Thomas	4:48

Side two
No.	Title	Original Artist	Length
1.	"I Love a Rainy Night" (David Malloy, Eddie Rabbitt, Even Stevens)	Eddie Rabbitt	3:06
2.	"Mammas Don't Let Your Babies Grow Up to Be ~~Cowboys~~ Chipmunks" (Ed Bruce, Patsy Bruce)	Ed Bruce	3:15
3.	"Coward of the County" (Roger Bowling, Billy Edd Wheeler)	Kenny Rogers	3:57
4.	"Made For Each Other (feat. Brenda Lee)" (Ross Bagdasarian Jr., Janice Karman, Larry Butler, Bruce Pinkard)	original song	5:28
5.	"On the Road Again" (Willie Nelson)	Willie Nelson	2:30

Urban Chipmunk was released on CD in 1993. For this release, the songs "Luckenbach, Texas (Back to the Basics of Love)" and "Made For Each Other" were deleted and replaced with new songs "The Devil Went Down to Georgia" and "Boot Scootin' Boogie". In addition, "I Love a Rainy Night" was retitled "I Love a Rainy Night (Saturday Morning Remix)" with new dialogue added. The cover art was also modified to feature the current character redesign.

=== 1993 CD remaster ===
No.	Title	Original Artist	Length
1.	"The Devil Went Down to Georgia" (Charlie Daniels, Tom Crain, "Taz" DiGregorio, Fred Edwards, Charles Hayward, James W. Marshall)	The Charlie Daniels Band	4:05
2.	"Mammas Don't Let Your Babies Grow Up to Be ~~Cowboys~~ Chipmunks" (Ed Bruce, Patsy Bruce)	Ed Bruce	3:15
3.	"The Gambler" (Don Schlitz)	Bobby Bare	3:13
4.	"Lunchbox (feat. Jerry Reed)" (Albert Bouchard, Mike Diamond Sr.)	Jerry Reed	3:10
5.	"Another Somebody Done Somebody Wrong Song" (Larry Butler, Chips Moman)	B. J. Thomas	4:48
6.	"Boot Scootin' Boogie" (Ronnie Dunn)	Brooks & Dunn	3:11
7.	"I Love a Rainy Night (Saturday Morning Remix)" (David Malloy, Eddie Rabbitt, Even Stevens)	Eddie Rabbitt	3:45
8.	"Coward of the County" (Roger Bowling, Billy Edd Wheeler)	Kenny Rogers	3:57
9.	"Thank God I'm a Country Boy" (John Denver)	John Denver	1:43
10.	"On the Road Again" (Willie Nelson)	Willie Nelson	2:30

== Reception ==
Steve Simels of Stereo Review wrote, on its initial release, that "there's something oddly soothing about the furry trio's harmonies; they sound so organic, so natural, to ears lately abused by their spiritual heirs, the Bee Gees. Moreover, most of the country hits that the tiny rodents essay here are of the ultra-commercial, protest-the-smell-of-cow-manure variety, so the Platinum Vermins' vocal approach seems eminently appropriate, far more idiomatically authentic than they were on the otherwise admirable 'Chipmunk Punk'". He added"

In fact, now that I think about it, this may turn out to be a two-joke act, the second joke being that since these songs are not at all defaced by the ridiculous gimmick of the Chipmunks' electronically speeded-up singing, we may have to come to the grim realization that mainstream country is as bland, plastic, and soulless as any other musical genre that gets played on the radio a lot. To Alvin, Simon, and Theodore, then-thanks a lot, fellas.

Rich Aregood of the Philadelphia Daily News wrote that "Alvin, Simon and Theodore have never been in better form than they are on 'Urban Chipmunk', an overdue sendup of the phenomenon that turned outlaws into drugstore cowboys." A critic for The Philadelphia Inquirer had a different reaction to the record, though, saying, "perhaps it's all very cute and fine for the Kiddy set, but why an adult would want to sit around listening to the Chipmunks doing 'Luckenbach, Texas' when they could hear Waylon Jennings' version is a puzzle." Martha Hume of the New York Daily News wrote that "Alvin and the boys took very few chances with material, since every single song on the "Urban Chipmunk" has already been a national hit. Nonetheless, the Chipmunks bring new life to such classics as 'Mamas Don't Let Your Babies Grow Up To Be (Cowboys) Chipmunks' and Willie Nelson's 'On The Road Again', which Alvin persists in singing as 'Off The Road Again.' Actually, the Chipmunks have only one bad cut on the record, a cleaned up rendition of 'Coward of the County,' which, even sanitized, is not suitable material for the Chipmunks. That's just a minor quibble, however, and those people who can bear listening to 10 songs worth of falsetto trios that would shame even the Bee Gers will probably like this record." Al Freeders of the Dayton Daily News wrote that "all good songs are here, done in high fashion with nothing missing. Production from the hand of Larry Butler, Janice Karman and Ross Bagdasarian is great [...] just listen to 'The Gambler,' 'I Love a Rainy Night,' 'Thank God Tm a Country Boy,' and 'Mama, Don't Let Your Babies Grow Up To Be Chipmunks' for fine entertainment." Hardy Price of The Arizona Republic called it "a wonderful spoof of the current trend in country music [that] couldn't have come at a better time." Wrote Robert Hilburn of the Los Angeles Times, however:

The problem with "Urban Chipmunk" is that the producers ham it up at every turn. The secret to "Chipmunk Punk," the delightful spoof on punk-rock, was that the speeded-up voices were the only gimmick. The album sold a million copies because it caught on as much with rock fans as the pre-teens that you'd think would be the chief audience for this type of novelty. This time, however, the innocence of that LP has been lost because the producers over-kill with voice-over gags and lyric revisions that turn things like "Mamas Don't Let Your Babies Grow Up to Be Cowboys" into "Mamas Don't Let Your Babies Grow Up to Be Chipmunks." Even the kids will probably be bored.

=== Charts and certifications ===
The album ended up earning a Gold certification from the RIAA, the Chipmunks' second Gold album following 1980's Chipmunk Punk.

On the Billboard Top LPs chart, the record peaked at No. 56, while on the country chart, it reached No. 23.

Chart (1981)	Peak position
U.S. Billboard Top Country Albums	23
U.S. Billboard 200	56

== Personnel ==
- Ross Bagdasarian Jr. — lead vocals (Alvin, Simon, David Seville)
- Janice Karman — lead vocals (Theodore)
- Buzz Cason — background vocals
- Bergen White — background vocals
- Dennis Wilson — background vocals
- Bob ”King” Moore — bass
- Jerry Carrigan — drums
- Hargus "Pig" Robbins — pedal steel guitars
- Rick Carlson – keyboards and piano
- Ray Edenton — rhythm guitars
- Billy Sanford — auxiliary percussion
- Jimmy Capps — rhythm guitars
- Leon Rhodes — lead guitar
- Buddy Spicher — fiddle

== Production crew ==
- Ross Bagdasarian Jr — producer
- Janice Karman — producer
- Larry Butler — producer
- Billy Sherill — engineer
- Dain & DeJoy — album coordination
- Rick Detorie — art direction and illustrations
- David Foster — project consultant
- John Boylan — project consultant
