= Alvin and the Chipmunks in film =

Theatrical appearances of fictional animated singing group

Alvin and the Chipmunks
- Logo of the 2007 film
- Created by: Ross Bagdasarian
- Original work: Alvin and the Chipmunks
- Owners: Bagdasarian Productions; The Samuel Goldwyn Company (1987 only); Universal Pictures (1999-2000; Direct-to-video films); 20th Century Fox (Fox 2000 Pictures/Regency Enterprises) (2007-2015; live action films); Big Shot Pictures (2028; reboot film)

Films and television
- Films: The Chipmunk Adventure (1987); Alvin and the Chipmunks (2007); Alvin and the Chipmunks: The Squeakquel (2009); Alvin and the Chipmunks: Chipwrecked (2011); Alvin and the Chipmunks: The Road Chip (2015); Reboot film (2028)
- Direct-to-video: Alvin and the Chipmunks Meet Frankenstein (1999); Alvin and the Chipmunks Meet the Wolfman (2000); Little Alvin and the Mini-Munks (2003)

Audio
- Soundtracks: The Chipmunk Adventure (1987); Little Alvin and the Mini-Munks (2003); Alvin and the Chipmunks (2007); Alvin and the Chipmunks: The Squeakquel (2009); Alvin and the Chipmunks: Chipwrecked (2011); Alvin and the Chipmunks: The Road Chip (2015)
- Original music: Undeniable (2008)

Official website
- Official website

The fictional animated singing group Alvin and the Chipmunks created by Ross Bagdasarian have appeared in eight feature-length films since their debut.

== Films ==
Film	U.S. release date	Director(s)	Producer(s)	Writer(s)	Composer	Productions	Distributors
Theatrical
The Chipmunk Adventure	May 22, 1987	Janice Karman	Janice Karman and Ross Bagdasarian Jr.	Janice Karman and Ross Bagdasarian Jr.	Randy Edelman	Bagdasarian Productions	The Samuel Goldwyn Company
Alvin and the Chipmunks	December 14, 2007	Tim Hill	Janice Karman and Ross Bagdasarian Jr.	Jon Vitti & Will McRobb & Chris Viscardi	Christopher Lennertz	Bagdasarian Productions; Regency Enterprises; Fox 2000 Pictures	20th Century Fox
The Squeakquel	December 23, 2009	Betty Thomas	Janice Karman and Ross Bagdasarian Jr.	Jon Vitti and Jonathan Aibel and Glenn Berger	David Newman	Bagdasarian Productions; Regency Enterprises; Fox 2000 Pictures	20th Century Fox
Chipwrecked	December 16, 2011	Mike Mitchell	Janice Karman and Ross Bagdasarian Jr.	Jonathan Aibel and Glenn Berger	Mark Mothersbaugh	Bagdasarian Productions; Regency Enterprises; Fox 2000 Pictures	20th Century Fox
The Road Chip	December 18, 2015	Walt Becker	Janice Karman and Ross Bagdasarian Jr.	Randi Mayem Singer and Adam Sztykiel	Mark Mothersbaugh	Bagdasarian Productions; Regency Enterprises; Fox 2000 Pictures	20th Century Fox
Untitled reboot film	2028	TBA	TBA	TBA	TBA	Big Shot Pictures	Sony Pictures Releasing
Direct-to-video
Alvin and the Chipmunks Meet Frankenstein	September 28, 1999	Kathi Castillo	Kathi Castillo	John Loy	Mark Watters	Bagdasarian Productions; Universal Cartoon Studios	Universal Studios Home Video; Universal Pictures
Alvin and the Chipmunks Meet the Wolfman	August 29, 2000	Kathi Castillo	Kathi Castillo	John Loy	Mark Watters	Bagdasarian Productions; Universal Cartoon Studios	Universal Studios Home Video; Universal Pictures
Little Alvin and the Mini-Munks	November 15, 2003	Jerry Rees	Ross Bagdasarian Jr.	Janice Karman	Ross Bagdasarian Jr.	Bagdasarian Productions	—N/a

=== Theatrical animated film ===
==== The Chipmunk Adventure (1987) ====
When David Seville goes off to Europe on a business trip, the Chipmunks, Alvin, Simon and Theodore, are left at home with their babysitter, Miss Miller. While the three are playing an arcade game of Around the World in Thirty Days with the Chipettes, Alvin and Brittany argue over which would win an actual race around the world, since Brittany beat Alvin in the video game. Diamond smugglers Claudia and Klaus Furschtein overhear the conversation and approach the children, telling them that they will provide them with the means for a real race around the world by hot air balloon, with the winner receiving $100,000.

=== Theatrical live-action films ===
==== Original series ====
===== Alvin and the Chipmunks (2007) =====
In a tree farm, three musically inclined chipmunk brothers, Alvin (Justin Long), the mischievous troublemaker, Simon (Matthew Gray Gubler), the smart one in the trio, and Theodore (Jesse McCartney) the chubby sweethearted chipmunk, find their tree cut down and are transported to Los Angeles. Once there, they meet frustrated songwriter David Seville (Jason Lee), and despite a poor house-wrecking first impression, they impress him with their singing talent. Seeing the opportunity for success, both human and chipmunks make a pact for them to sing his songs. While that ambition proves a frustrating struggle with the difficult trio, the dream does come true after all. However, that success presents its own trials as their unscrupulous record executive, Ian Hawke (David Cross), plans to break up this family to exploit the boys. Can Dave and the Chipmunks discover what they really value amid the superficial glamour around them?

===== Alvin and the Chipmunks: The Squeakquel (2009) =====
Pop sensations Alvin (Justin Long), Simon (Matthew Gray Gubler) and Theodore (Jesse McCartney) end up in the care of Dave Seville's (Jason Lee) twenty-something cousin Toby (Zachary Levi). The boys must put aside music super stardom to return to school, and are tasked with saving the school's music program by winning the $25,000 prize in a battle of the bands. But the Chipmunks unexpectedly meet their match in three singing chipmunk sisters known as The Chipettes—Brittany (Christina Applegate), Jeanette (Anna Faris) and Eleanor (Amy Poehler). Romantic and musical sparks are ignited when the Chipmunks and Chipettes square off.

===== Alvin and the Chipmunks: Chipwrecked (2011) =====
Dave (Jason Lee), the Chipmunks, and the Chipettes enjoy fun and mischief on a luxury cruise before their seafaring vacation takes a detour to an uncharted island. The harder Alvin (Justin Long) and friends search for a way back to civilization, the more obvious it becomes that they are not alone on this secluded island paradise.

===== Alvin and the Chipmunks: The Road Chip (2015) =====
Through a series of misunderstandings, Alvin (Justin Long), Simon (Matthew Gray Gubler) and Theodore (Jesse McCartney) come to believe that Dave (Jason Lee) is going to propose to his new girlfriend in Miami...and dump them. They have three days to get to him and stop the proposal, saving themselves not only from losing Dave but possibly from gaining a terrible stepbrother.

==== Reboot series ====
===== Untitled reboot (2028) =====
In July 2026, it was announced that Brian Robbins had acquired a 25% stake in Bagdasarian Productions, with plans to reboot the series with a new theatrical film in 2028.

=== Direct-to-video animated films ===
==== Alvin and the Chipmunks Meet Frankenstein (1999) ====
When the Chipmunks take a break from their concert, they get lost, and eventually get locked inside the park. They find their way to the "Frankenstein's Castle" attraction, where a real Dr. Victor Frankenstein is working on his monster. The monster is brought to life, and the doctor sends it in pursuit of the Chipmunks. In their escape, the monster retrieves Theodore's dropped teddy bear. Now it's up to the Chipmunks to get back his teddy bear and do something to the monster.

==== Alvin and the Chipmunks Meet the Wolfman (2000) ====
When Alvin has nightmares of meeting the Wolfman, which led him waking up screaming in horror, Simon and Dave conclude that Alvin's been watching too many horror films at night. Alvin says that it is because their new neighbor, Lawrence Talbot, creeps him out and speculates that he is hiding something. Theodore is having trouble with Nathan, a bully, and will not go to the principal, who plans to retire due to Alvin's daily mishaps, for help; Alvin sticks up for him, however.

=== Direct-to-video live-action films ===
==== Little Alvin and the Mini-Munks (2003) ====
La-Lu, a friend of David Seville, has put up a banner saying "Welcome Chipmunks" on the porch of her magic cottage. One of her friends, Gilda (a talking pessimistic cockatoo) believes that having children around is a bad idea. PC (a talking laid back frog with a surfer dude accent who believes he is one kiss away from being Prince Charming) says that his mom used to say "nothing warms up a home like children's laughter". Dave arrives with Alvin, Brittany, Simon, Jeanette, Theodore, and Eleanor. Dave needs the weekend to himself to write a new song, and La-Lu is happy to have five pre-schoolers and a baby stay with her and her friends. Sam and Lou, two gophers, report to the viewers at home about the feelings the characters are experiencing via going into their heads and viewing an abstract inner visual manifestation of what the characters are thinking and or feeling. Alvin doesn't like that Dave is gone, and La-Lu explains that she felt the same way when she was little and reassures him that Dave will return for him and the others soon.

== Reception ==
=== Box office performance ===
The live action animated films are the highest-grossing live-action/animated film series and 6th highest-grossing musicals film series of all time. The first film ranks as the 7th highest grossing live-action/animated film of all time, with its sequels being ranked 4th, 11th, and 22nd of all time.

Film	Release date	Revenue			Box office ranking		Budget	Ref.
Film	Release date	U.S. and Canada	Other territories	Worldwide	U.S. and Canada	Worldwide	Budget	Ref.
The Chipmunk Adventure	May 22, 1987	$6,804,312		$6,804,312	#5,807	#8,349		
Alvin and the Chipmunks	December 14, 2007	$217,326,974	$148,025,572	$365,352,546	#177	#370	$60 million	
Alvin and the Chipmunks: The Squeakquel	December 23, 2009	$219,614,612	$223,525,393	$443,140,005	#169	#269	$75 million	
Alvin and the Chipmunks: Chipwrecked	December 16, 2011	$133,110,742	$209,584,693	$342,695,435	#468	#403	$75 million	
Alvin and the Chipmunks: The Road Chip	December 18, 2015	$85,886,987	$148,911,649	$234,798,636	#899	#627	$90 million	
Total		$662,743,627	$730,047,307	$1,392,790,934			$300 million	

=== Critical and public response ===
The live action films received negative reviews from critics, though audiences positively responded to these films.

Film	Rotten Tomatoes	Metacritic	CinemaScore
The Chipmunk Adventure	75% (8 reviews)	—N/a	—N/a
Alvin and the Chipmunks	28% (101 reviews)	39 (23 reviews)	A
Alvin and the Chipmunks: The Squeakquel	21% (84 reviews)	41 (20 reviews)	A
Alvin and the Chipmunks: Chipwrecked	11% (76 reviews)	24 (19 reviews)	B+
Alvin and the Chipmunks: The Road Chip	16% (67 reviews)	33 (19 reviews)	A−

== Cast and crew ==
=== Cast ===
List indicator
A dark gray cell indicates the character was not featured in the film.

List indicators

This section includes characters who will appear or have appeared in the series.

- An empty grey cell indicates the character was not in the film, or that the character's official presence has not yet been confirmed.
- ^{A} indicates an appearance through archival footage or audio.
- ^{V} indicates a voice-only role.

A ^{S} indicates a performer stood in as a characters singing voice.

Characters	Theatrical films					Direct-to-video films		
Characters	The Chipmunk Adventure	Alvin and the Chipmunks	Alvin and the Chipmunks: The Squeakquel	Alvin and the Chipmunks: Chipwrecked	Alvin and the Chipmunks: The Road Chip	Alvin and the Chipmunks Meet Frankenstein	Alvin and the Chipmunks Meet the Wolfman	Little Alvin and the Mini-Munks
Chipmunks
Alvin Seville	Ross Bagdasarian Jr.	Justin Long^{V}	Justin Long^{V}	Justin Long^{V}	Justin Long^{V}	Ross Bagdasarian Jr.	Ross Bagdasarian Jr.	Ross Bagdasarian Jr.
Alvin Seville	Ross Bagdasarian Jr.	Ross Bagdasarian Jr.^{S}	Ross Bagdasarian Jr.^{S}	Ross Bagdasarian Jr.^{S}	Ross Bagdasarian Jr.^{S}	Ross Bagdasarian Jr.	Ross Bagdasarian Jr.	Ross Bagdasarian Jr.
Simon Seville	Ross Bagdasarian Jr.	Matthew Gray Gubler^{V}	Matthew Gray Gubler^{V}	Matthew Gray Gubler^{V}	Matthew Gray Gubler^{V}	Ross Bagdasarian Jr.	Ross Bagdasarian Jr.	Ross Bagdasarian Jr.
Simon Seville	Ross Bagdasarian Jr.	Steve Vining^{S}	Steve Vining^{S}	Steve Vining^{S}	Steve Vining^{S}	Ross Bagdasarian Jr.	Ross Bagdasarian Jr.	Ross Bagdasarian Jr.
Simon Seville	Ross Bagdasarian Jr.	Steve Vining^{S}	Steve Vining^{S}	Alan Tudyk (Note: Alan Tudyk provides the voice of Simone, an alter ego Simon undergoes after being bitten by a Spider.)	Steve Vining^{S}	Ross Bagdasarian Jr.	Ross Bagdasarian Jr.	Ross Bagdasarian Jr.
Theodore Seville	Janice Karman	Jesse McCartney^{V}	Jesse McCartney^{V}	Jesse McCartney^{V}	Jesse McCartney^{V}	Janice Karman	Janice Karman	Janice Karman
Theodore Seville	Janice Karman	Janice Karman^{S}	Janice Karman^{S}	Janice Karman^{S}	Janice Karman^{S}	Janice Karman	Frank Welker (Note: Frank Welker provides the voice of Theodore's Werewolf form.)	Janice Karman
Brittany Miller	Janice Karman	Silent cameo in end credits	Christina Applegate^{V}	Christina Applegate^{V}	Christina Applegate^{V}		Janice Karman	Janice Karman
Brittany Miller	Janice Karman	Silent cameo in end credits	Janice Karman^{S}	Janice Karman^{S}	Janice Karman^{S}		Janice Karman	Janice Karman
Jeanette Miller	Janice Karman	Silent cameo in end credits	Anna Faris^{V}	Anna Faris^{V}	Anna Faris^{V}		Janice Karman	Janice Karman
Jeanette Miller	Janice Karman	Silent cameo in end credits	Janice Karman^{S}	Janice Karman^{S}	Janice Karman^{S}		Janice Karman	Janice Karman
Eleanor Miller	Janice Karman	Silent cameo in end credits	Amy Poehler^{V}	Amy Poehler^{V}	Kaley Cuoco^{V}		Janice Karman	Janice Karman
Eleanor Miller	Janice Karman	Silent cameo in end credits	Janice Karman^{S}	Janice Karman^{S}	Janice Karman^{S}		Janice Karman	Janice Karman
Humans
David "Dave" Seville	Ross Bagdasarian Jr.	Jason Lee	Jason Lee	Jason Lee	Jason Lee	Ross Bagdasarian Jr.	Ross Bagdasarian Jr.	Ross Bagdasarian Jr.
Miss Beatrice Miller	Dody Goodman					Mary Kay Bergman	Mary Kay Bergman^{A}	
Claudia Furschtein	Susan Tyrrell							
Klaus Furschtein	Anthony De Longis							
Native Chief	Frank Welker							
Inspector Jamal	Ken Sansom							
Ian Hawke		David Cross	David Cross	David Cross				
Claire Wilson		Cameron Richardson						
Gail		Jane Lynch						
Toby Seville			Zachary Levi					
Dr. Rubin			Wendie Malick					
Julie Ortega			Anjelah Johnson					
Ryan Edwards			Kevin G. Schmidt					
Xander			Chris Warren, Jr.					
Jeremy Smith			Brando Eaton					
Zoe				Jenny Slate				
Captain Correlli				Andy Buckley				
Agent James Suggs					Tony Hale			
Miles					Josh Green			
Samantha					Kimberly Williams-Paisley			
Ashley Grey					Bella Thorne			
Doctor Victor Frankenstein						Michael Bell		
Frankie						Frank Welker	Silent cameo	
Mr. Yesman						Jim Meskimen		
Lawrence Talbot							Maurice LaMarche	
Lawrence Talbot							Frank Welker (Note: Frank Welker provides the voice of Talbot's Werewolf form.)	
Principal Milliken							Miriam Flynn	
Mr. Rochelle							Rob Paulsen	
Madame Raya							April Winchell	
Nathan							Elizabeth Daily	
La-Lu								Janice Karman
Other animals
Sophie	Frank Welker							
Baby penguin	Frank Welker							
Sammy Squirrel						Frank Welker		
The Wolfman							Frank Welker	
PC								Lex Lang
Sam and Lou								Jerry Rees

=== Crew ===
Crew	Theatrical films					Direct-to-video films		
Crew	The Chipmunk Adventure	Alvin and the Chipmunks	Alvin and the Chipmunks: The Squeakquel	Alvin and the Chipmunks: Chipwrecked	Alvin and the Chipmunks: The Road Chip	Alvin and the Chipmunks Meet Frankenstein	Alvin and the Chipmunks Meet the Wolfman	Little Alvin and the Mini-Munks
Director(s)	Janice Karman	Tim Hill	Betty Thomas	Mike Mitchell	Walt Becker	Kathi Castillo	Kathi Castillo	Jerry Rees
Producer(s)	Janice Karman; Ross Bagdasarian Jr.	Janice Karman; Ross Bagdasarian Jr.	Janice Karman; Ross Bagdasarian Jr.	Janice Karman; Ross Bagdasarian Jr.	Janice Karman; Ross Bagdasarian Jr.	Kathi Castillo	Kathi Castillo	Ross Bagdasarian Jr.
Writer(s)	Janice Karman; Ross Bagdasarian Jr.	Screenplay by: Jon Vitti; Will McRobb & Chris Viscardi Story by: Jon Vitti	Jon Vitti; Jonathan Aibel; Glenn Berger	Jonathan Aibel and Glenn Berger	Randi Mayem Singer; Adam Sztykiel	John Loy	John Loy	Janice Karman
Composer(s)	Randy Edelman	Christopher Lennertz	David Newman	Mark Mothersbaugh	Mark Mothersbaugh	Mark Watters	Mark Watters	Ross Bagdasarian Jr.
Editor(s)	Tony Mizgalski	Peter E. Berger	Matthew Friedman	Peter Amundson	Ryan Folsey	Jay Bisxen	Jay Bisxen	Ross Bagdasarian Jr.
Cinematographer(s)	—N/a	Peter Lyons Collister	Anthony B. Richmond	Thomas E. Ackerman	Peter Lyons Collister	—N/a	—N/a	—N/a
Production Company	Bagdasarian Productions	Bagdasarian Productions Regency Enterprises; Fox 2000 Pictures				Bagdasarian Productions	Bagdasarian Productions	Bagdasarian Productions
