= Alvin and the Chipmunks: The Road Chip =

2015 film by Walt Becker

- Theatrical release poster
- Directed by: Walt Becker
- Written by: Randi Mayem Singer; Adam Sztykiel
- Based on: Alvin and the Chipmunks by Ross Bagdasarian Sr.; The Chipettes by Janice Karman
- Produced by: Janice Karman; Ross Bagdasarian Jr.
- Starring: Jason Lee; Tony Hale; Kimberly Williams-Paisley; Josh Green; Justin Long; Matthew Gray Gubler; Jesse McCartney; Kaley Cuoco; Anna Faris; Christina Applegate
- Cinematography: Peter Lyons Collister
- Edited by: Ryan Folsey
- Music by: Mark Mothersbaugh
- Production companies: Fox 2000 Pictures; Regency Enterprises; Bagdasarian Company
- Distributed by: 20th Century Fox
- Release date: December 18, 2015
- Running time: 92 minutes
- Country: United States
- Language: English
- Budget: $90 million
- Box office: $249.5 million

Alvin and the Chipmunks: The Road Chip is a 2015 American musical comedy film directed by Walt Becker and written by Randi Mayem Singer and Adam Sztykiel. It is based on the characters Alvin and the Chipmunks created by Ross Bagdasarian Sr. and the Chipettes created by Janice Karman. It is the fourth and final installment in the live-action Alvin and the Chipmunks film series, following Alvin and the Chipmunks: Chipwrecked (2011). The ensemble cast includes Jason Lee, Tony Hale, Kimberly Williams-Paisley and Josh Green. Justin Long, Matthew Gray Gubler, Jesse McCartney, Christina Applegate and Anna Faris reprise their voice roles from the first three films with Kaley Cuoco replacing Amy Poehler. The plot centers on the Chipmunks (Alvin, Simon, and Theodore) as they head to Miami after believing that Dave Seville will propose to his girlfriend Samantha, who has a son who bullies the Chipmunks.

Alvin and the Chipmunks: The Road Chip was released in the United States on December 18, 2015, by 20th Century Fox. It received negative reviews from critics and grossed $249.5 million against its $90 million budget, becoming the lowest-grossing entry in the franchise. At the 36th Golden Raspberry Awards, Cuoco won a Razzie for Worst Actress.

An untitled animated reboot film is scheduled to be released in 2028.

== Plot ==
Alvin, Simon, and Theodore, along with the Chipettes—Brittany, Jeanette, and Eleanor—have moved to a new house and set up a surprise birthday bash for Dave Seville that also serves as a good luck party for the Chipettes, who are scheduled to be guest judges on American Idol. Alvin invites and hires many people and celebrities, much to Simon's dismay. Though dissatisfied, Dave agrees to take them mini-golfing, where the Chipmunks meet Samantha, who Dave has been dating for the past months. While the Chipmunks like Samantha, her son Miles physically torments the trio. Later, the Chipmunks find an engagement ring in a bag Dave brought home and believe that he is going to propose to Samantha. Realizing in horror that Dave and Samantha getting married would make Miles their stepbrother, they unsuccessfully try to steal the ring.

Dave has to produce a record for rising pop music artist Ashley Grey in Miami, and decides to bring Samantha along with him. The Chipmunks and Miles are staying together, but they agree to head to Miami to sabotage the supposed marriage proposal. The Chipmunks drug three squirrels and dress them up in their clothes from stuffed toys to fool their next door neighbor Ms. Price, who was asked to peek in on them. They travel by plane, but Theodore lets out several animals, leading to an emergency landing in Austin, Texas, and frustrates unscrupulous Air Marshal James Suggs, who hates the Chipmunks because of having been dumped by his girlfriend on Christmas for being a fan at the time, effectively eliminating his shot of becoming an FBI agent. Suggs puts the Chipmunks on the No-Fly List as revenge.

The Chipmunks perform at a bar, but are caught by Suggs. Alvin starts a bar fight so they can escape. They jump into a cab, but the driver ejects them for not having money. Resting against an old tree, Miles reveals that his father left him when he was young, causing the four to bond and see each other differently. They raise money busking to take a bus to New Orleans and perform at a Mardi Gras parade, which draws Dave's attention as it is broadcast on live television. The parade allows the Chipmunks to cause Suggs, who has followed them, to get drunk on moonshine. Dave and Samantha find Miles and the Chipmunks at Louis Armstrong New Orleans International Airport and punish them for sneaking out and not responding to numerous missed calls and texts from Dave and what they did. With the Chipmunks now on the No-Fly List, Dave has to drive them.

When they arrive in Miami, Alvin reveals that he stole the ring from the container, thus sabotaging the proposal. However, since Miles has grown to care about the Chipmunks during their trip, he is upset that they are celebrating over this. Crossing the street with his headphones on, he is nearly hit by a car, but the Chipmunks swing Theodore, pushing Miles out of the way and saving his life. Theodore gets hit instead, but he wakes up a moment later. They agree to give the ring back.

During the dinner, Suggs catches up with the Chipmunks, but they trap him in an elevator. Miles and the Chipmunks return the ring to Dave, saying that they accept Samantha and Miles into the family, but Dave reveals the ring belonged to his friend Barry, who was proposing to his girlfriend Alice. As one final apology, they try making it up to Dave by singing a new song to him at the launch party with the help of the Chipettes, Ashley and Miles. They also return the ring to Barry, who reattempts his proposal to Alice, and this time Alice accepts. Having forgiven them, Dave officially adopts the Chipmunks as his sons, but finds about the squirrels which have destroyed the house, much to his anger as he shouts at Alvin again. Meanwhile, Suggs is freed from the elevator and decides to relax by the pool, only for security guards to carry him out as he is not a hotel guest.

== Cast ==
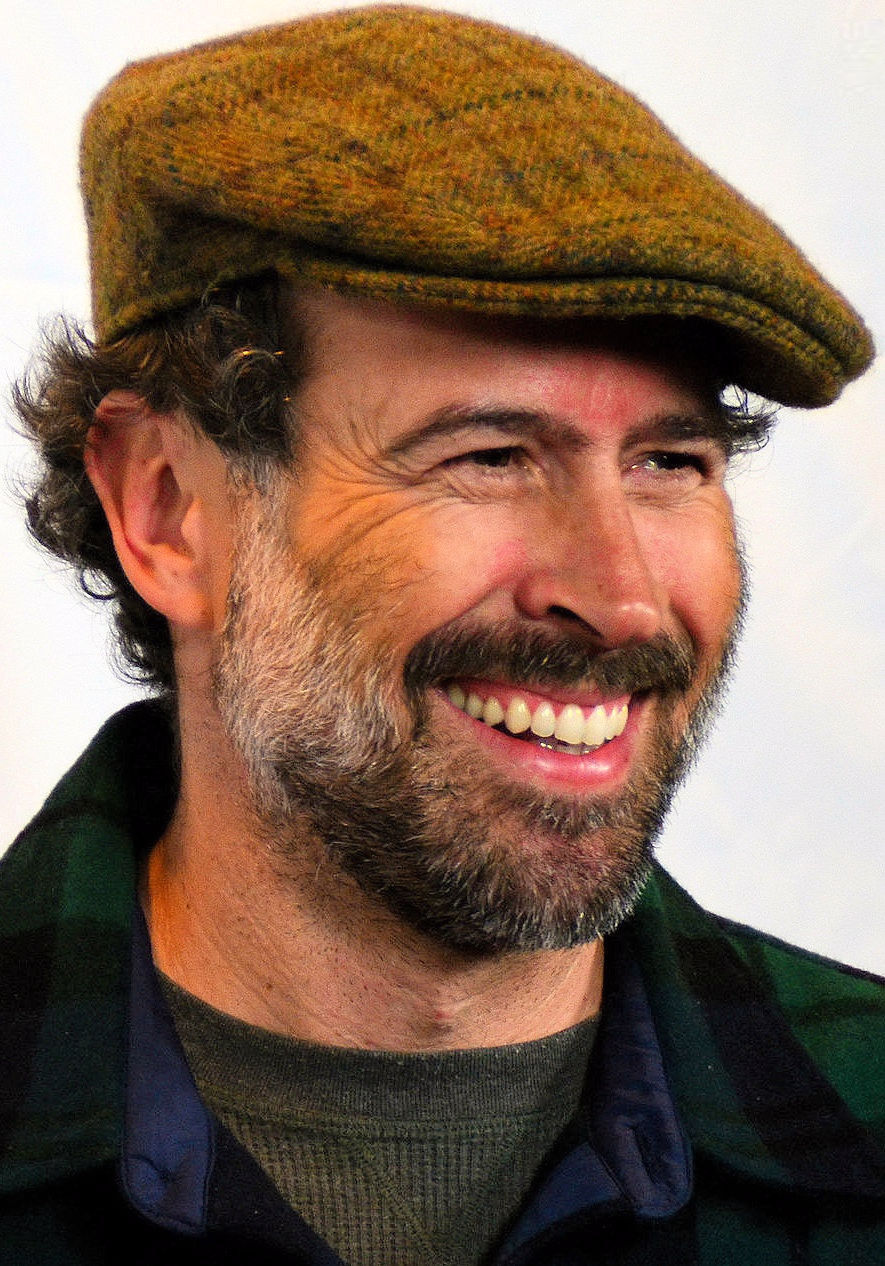
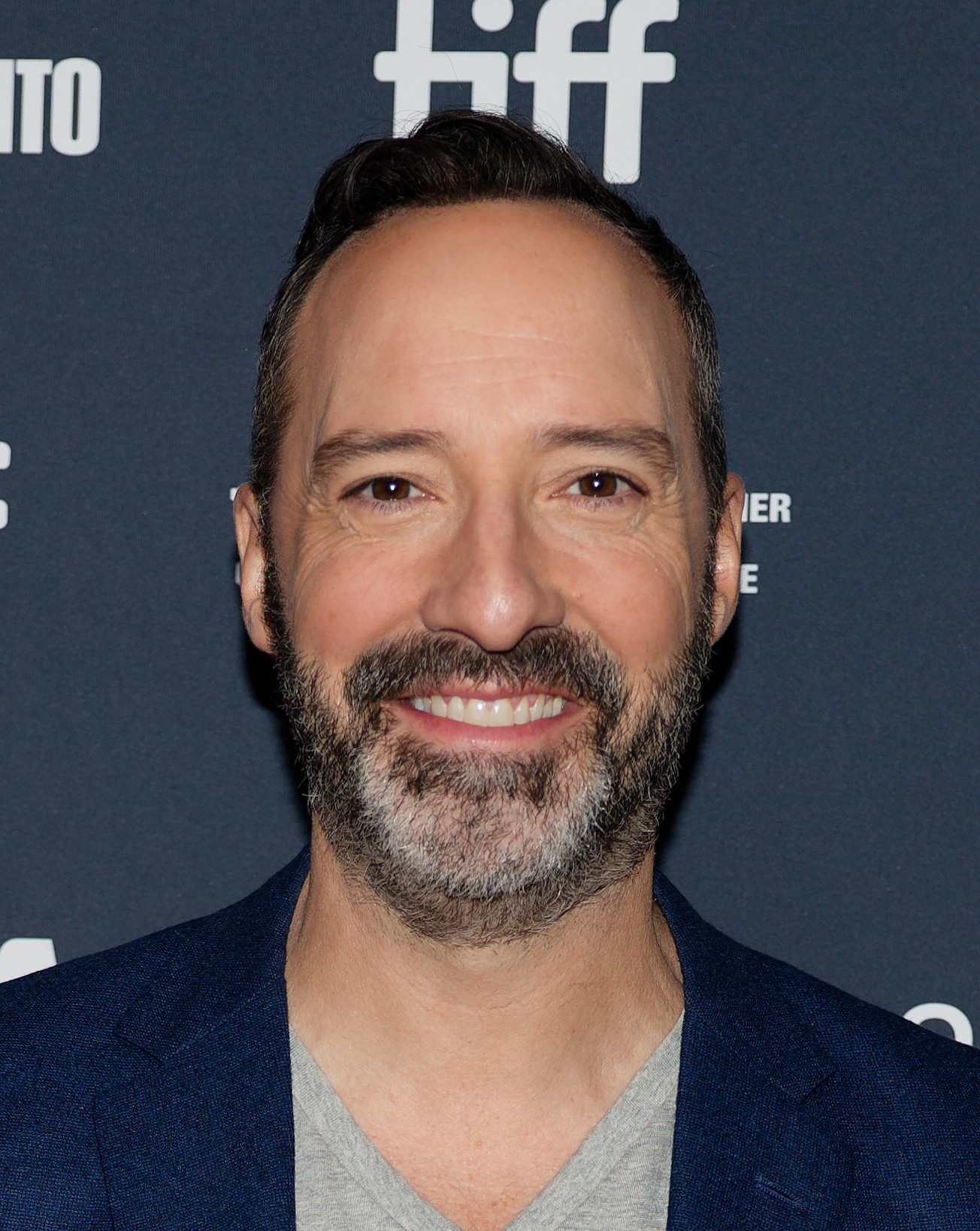
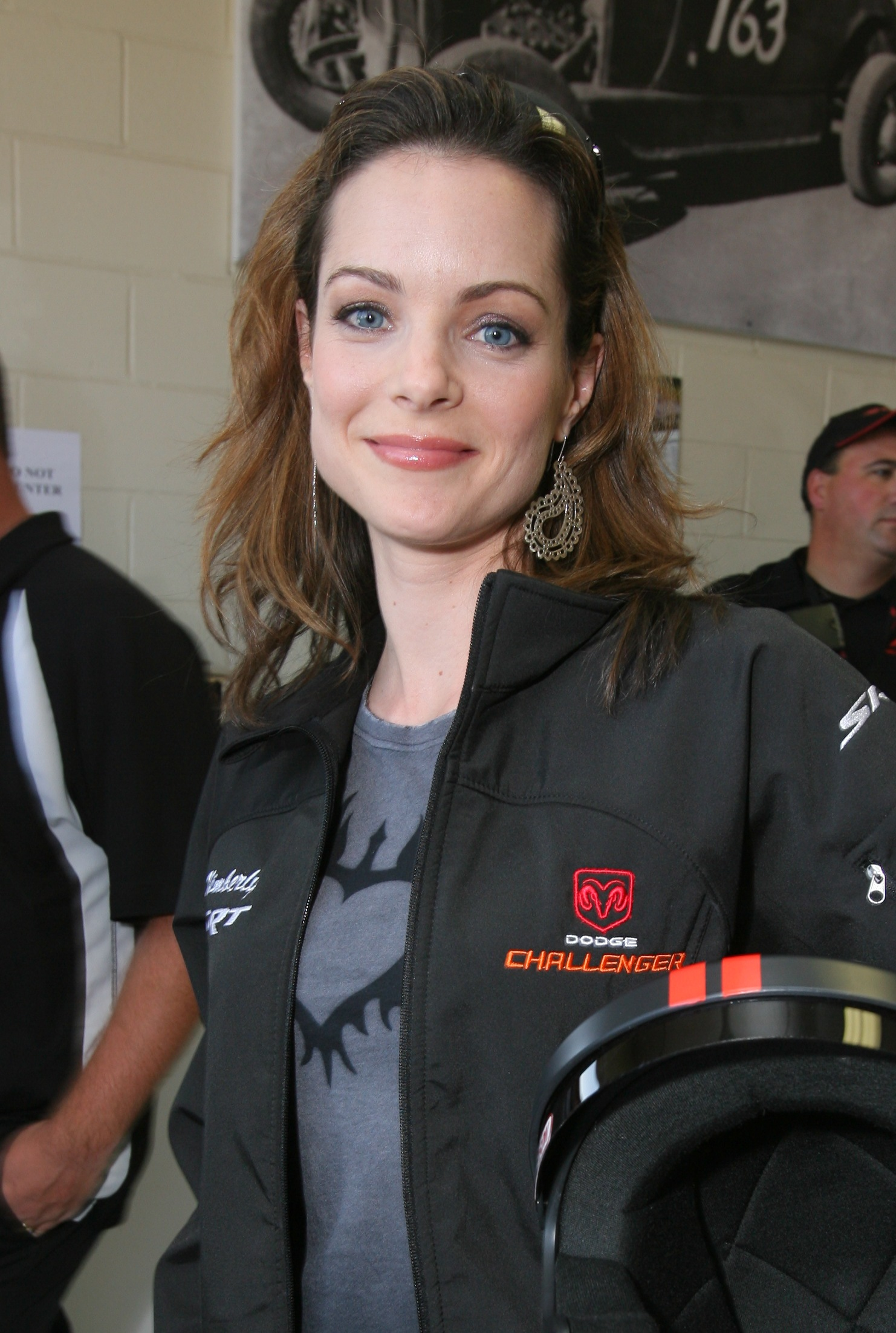
(L to R) Jason Lee (pictured in 2015), Tony Hale (2024), and Kimberly Williams-Paisley (2008)
- Jason Lee as David "Dave" Seville, a former songwriter turned music producer and the overprotective adoptive father of the Chipmunks and the Chipettes.
- Justin Long as Alvin Seville, a brave and musical but mischievous chipmunk who is the leader of the Chipmunks.
  - Ross Bagdasarian Jr. provides Alvin's singing voice
- Matthew Gray Gubler as Simon Seville, an intelligent chipmunk who is the tallest of the three and a member of the Chipmunks.
  - Steve Vining provides Simon's singing voice.
- Jesse McCartney as Theodore Seville, a timid chipmunk who is the smallest of the three and a member of the Chipmunks.
  - Janice Karman provides Theodore's singing voice.
- Tony Hale as Agent James Suggs, an unscrupulous air marshal who personally despises the Chipmunks because his former love for them ruined a former relationship between him and his girlfriend, and as a result, he puts them on the No Fly List for revenge.
- Josh Green as Miles, Samantha's son who was initially mean to the Chipmunks, but later becomes their friend and is Ashley's love interest.
- Kimberly Williams-Paisley as Samantha, Dave's girlfriend and the woman he's been dating for the past few months
- Bella Thorne as Ashley Grey, a pop singer whom Dave has to produce a record for in Miami and Miles's love interest.
- Christina Applegate as Brittany, a fearless, determined, and independent chipmunk who is the leader of the Chipettes and is occasionally arguing with Alvin.
  - Janice Karman provides Brittany's singing voice.
- Anna Faris as Jeanette, a female chipmunk who is the tallest of the three, and the member of the Chipettes.
  - Janice Karman provides Jeanette's singing voice.
- Kaley Cuoco as Eleanor, a female chipmunk who is the smallest of the three, and the member of the Chipettes. (Cuoco replaces Amy Poehler as the voice of Eleanor).
  - Janice Karman provides Eleanor's singing voice.
- Uzo Aduba as TSA Officer at the LAX airport who checks over Miles when he brings Alvin in his backpack and Simon in his clothes.
- Flula Borg as Man Behind the Mask
- Retta as The Event Planner, a woman who Alvin hires to deal with Dave's birthday party at the beginning of the film.
- Eddie Steeples as Barry, Dave's friend who Dave had bought a ring for. Alvin, Simon, Theodore, and Miles accidentally sabotages his proposal to his girlfriend, Alice.

Additionally, Maxie McClintock appears as Alice, Mark Jeffrey Miller appears as Cab Driver, Redfoo appears as himself, John Waters appears as a first class passenger, Jennifer Coolidge appears as Ms. Price, Laura Marano appears as a Hotel Babysitter, and Zeeko Zaki appears as Paparazzo.

== Production ==
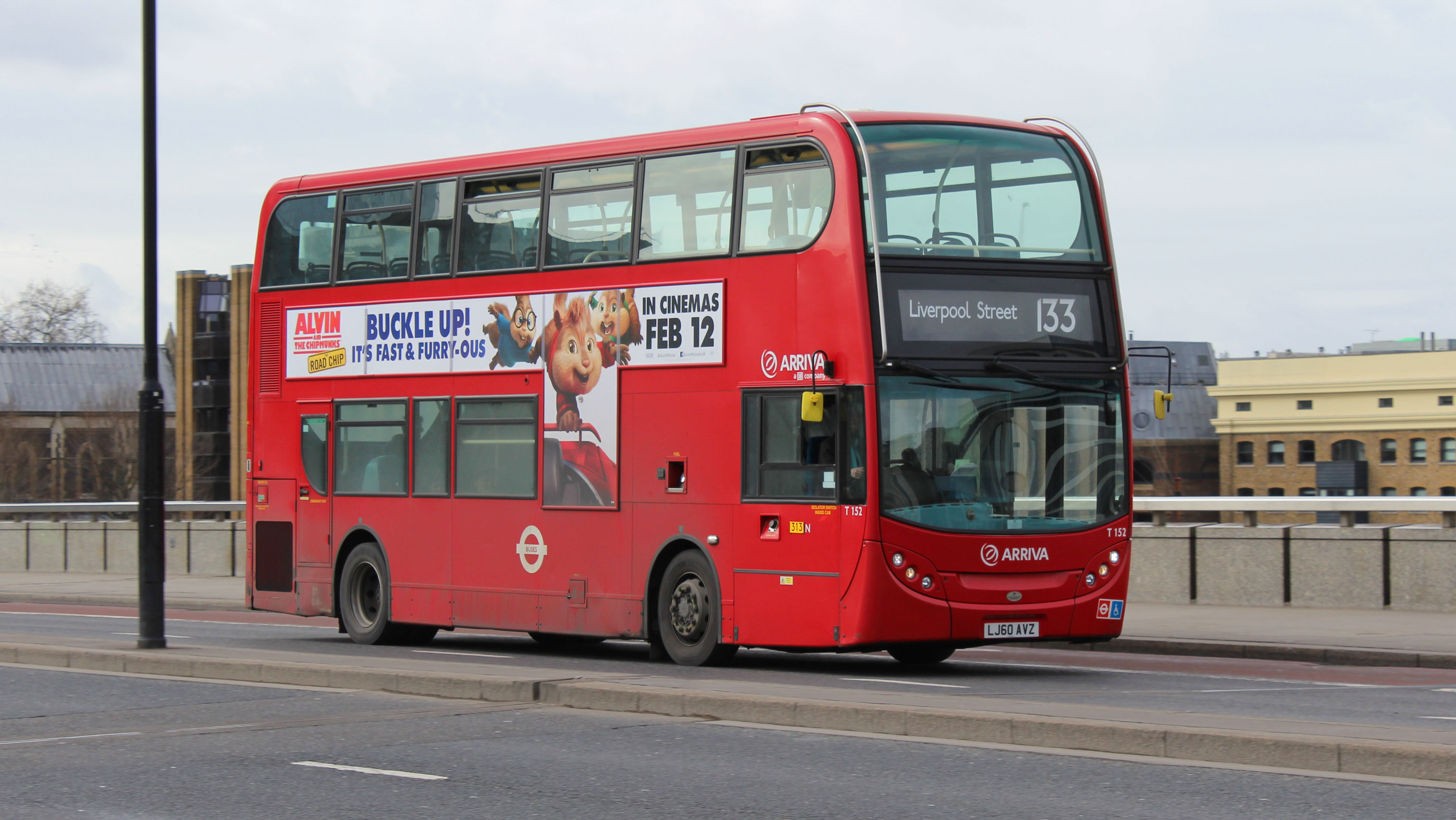
Bus promoting the film in London

In June 2013, 20th Century Fox announced that a fourth installment, Alvin and the Chipmunks 4, would be released on December 11, 2015. In August 2014, Randi Mayem Singer signed on to write the fourth installment. On December 18, 2014, it was announced that Walt Becker signed on to direct and that the film would be released on December 23, 2015. Unlike the previous films, where the Chipmunks and the Chipettes were animated by Rhythm & Hues Studios, in this film, they were animated by Wētā FX, due to Rhythm & Hues shutting down in 2013. The movie was officially released on December 18, 2015. It was also announced that the film would be titled Alvin and the Chipmunks: The Road Chip. In February 2015, Tony Hale joined the cast. On March 10, 2015, Kimberly Williams-Paisley joined the cast. On March 23, 2015, it was confirmed that Bella Thorne had joined the cast. Principal photography began on March 16, 2015, and ended on May 20, 2015.

== Music ==
Mark Mothersbaugh, who previously scored Alvin and the Chipmunks: Chipwrecked, returned to score The Road Chip.

== Home media ==
Alvin and the Chipmunks: The Road Chip was released on DVD and Blu-ray on March 15, 2016.

== Soundtrack ==
Alvin and the Chipmunks: The Road Chip: Original Motion Picture Soundtrack

Soundtrack album by The Chipmunks and The Chipettes ft. RedFoo, Sheppard & The Score
- Released: December 11, 2015
- Genres: Pop, rock, hip hop, dance
- Length: 29:55
- Label: Republic
- Producers: Ross Bagdasarian Jr., Janice Karman, Alana Da Fonseca

The Chipmunks and The Chipettes ft. RedFoo, Sheppard & The Score chronology
We're the Chipmunks (Music From the TV Show) (2015)	Alvin and the Chipmunks: The Road Chip: Original Motion Picture Soundtrack (2015)	Nuts 2 U (2017)

Alvin and the Chipmunks: The Road Chip: Original Motion Picture Soundtrack is the licensed soundtrack based on the film. It was released on December 11, 2015, by Republic Records.

No.	Title	Writer(s)	Performing artist(s)	Length
1.	"Juicy Wiggle (Munk Remix)"	Madeleine St. John	Redfoo (featuring The Chipmunks)	3:50
2.	"Conga"	Enrique E. Garcia	The Chipmunks	3:16
3.	"Oh My Love"	Eddie Anthony, Edan Dover	The Score	3:37
4.	"South Side"	Thomas Rhett, Jesse Frasure, Chris Stapleton	The Chipmunks	2:27
5.	"Iko Iko"	James Crawford, Barbara Hawkins, Rosa Hawkins, Joan Johnson	The Chipmunks	2:00
6.	"Uptown Funk"	Jeff Bhasker, Philip Lawrence, Bruno Mars, Mark Ronson, Nicholas Williams, Devon Gallaspy, Lonnie Simmons, The Gap Band, Rudolph Taylor	The Chipmunks	4:30
7.	"Geronimo"	Jay Bovino, Amy Sheppard, George Sheppard	Sheppard	3:37
8.	"Turn Down for What"	DJ Snake, Lil Jon	The Chipmunks	3:34
9.	"Home"	Alana Da Fonseca, Jordan Yaeger, Jason Gleed, Bryan Spytzer	The Chipmunks and the Chipettes	3:04
Total length:				31:39

== Reception ==
=== Box office ===
Alvin and the Chipmunks: The Road Chip has grossed $85.9 million in North America and $163.6 million in other territories for a worldwide total of $249.5 million against a budget of $90 million.

In the United States and Canada, The Road Chip was released on December 18, 2015, across 3,653 theaters. The film grossed $4,126,717 on its first day and $14,287,159 in its opening weekend, finishing second at the box office behind Star Wars: The Force Awakens ($247,966,675).

=== Critical response ===
On the review aggregator website Rotten Tomatoes, 16% of 67 critics' reviews are positive, with an average rating of 3.7/10. The website's consensus reads: "In some respects, Alvin and the Chipmunks: The Road Chip is a marginal improvement over prior installments, although this in no way qualifies as a recommendation." Metacritic, which uses a weighted average, assigned the film a score of 33 out of 100, based on 21 critics, indicating "generally unfavorable" reviews. Audiences polled by CinemaScore gave the film an average grade of "A−" on an A+ to F scale.

=== Accolades ===
List of awards and nominations
Award	Date of ceremony	Category	Recipient(s)	Result	Ref.
British Academy Children's Awards	November 20, 2016	BAFTA Kids' Vote	Alvin and the Chipmunks: The Road Chip	Nominated	
Golden Raspberry Awards	February 27, 2016	Worst Supporting Actor	Jason Lee	Nominated	
Golden Raspberry Awards	February 27, 2016	Worst Supporting Actress	Kaley Cuoco	Won	
Golden Raspberry Awards	February 27, 2016	Worst Prequel, Remake, Rip-off or Sequel	Alvin and the Chipmunks: The Road Chip	Nominated	
Kids' Choice Awards	March 12, 2016	Favorite Animated Movie	Alvin and the Chipmunks: The Road Chip	Nominated	
Kids' Choice Awards	March 12, 2016	Favorite Voice From an Animated Movie	Justin Long	Nominated	

== Future ==
An untitled animated reboot film is scheduled to be released in 2028.
