= Alvin for President =

Single by David Seville and The Chipmunks
- B-side: "Sack Time"
- Released: 1960
- Genre: Pop
- Length: 2:54
- Label: Liberty Records
- Songwriter: Ross Bagdasarian, Sr.
- Producers: Ross Bagdasarian, Sr.

The Chipmunks singles chronology
| "Witch Doctor (1960 version)" (1960) | "Alvin for President" (1960) | "Rudolph, the Red-Nosed Reindeer" (1960) |

"Alvin for President" is a non-album single by the fictional musical group, Alvin and the Chipmunks. The song was released as a single in 1960 and was the group's last chart entry on the Billboard Pop Singles Chart. This recording used the same music bed as another song, "I Wish I Could Speak French". The song was eventually adapted as a musical sequence on The Alvin Show the following year.

== Chart performance ==
After the success of The Chipmunks' previous four singles, which had all reached the Top 40, it was hoped that "Alvin for President" would do the same. Instead, the single reached No. 95 on the Billboard Pop Singles Chart, their first single not to reach the Top 40. It was the group's last chart entry not only on the Pop Singles Chart (later known as Billboard Hot 100), but on any of the Billboard charts until 1992, where their rendition of "Achy Breaky Heart", a song originally sung by Billy Ray Cyrus, peaked at No. 72 on Billboard's Hot Country Singles & Tracks.

== In popular culture ==
The song caught the attention of John F. Kennedy, who, during his 1960 presidential campaign, commented in a note to Bagdasarian that "I'm glad to know that I have at least one worthy opponent." He was not referring to Richard Nixon.

== See also ==
- Lists of fictional presidents of the United States
