= We're the Chipmunks (Music from the TV Show) =

Soundtrack album by The Chipmunks featuring The Chipettes
- Released: September 25, 2015 (digital); October 16, 2015 (CD)
- Recorded: 2015
- Studio: Bagdasarian Productions
- Length: 26:44
- Label: Bagdasarian; Chipmunk; Rhino
- Producer: Ross Bagdasarian Jr.

The Chipmunks featuring The Chipettes chronology
Alvin and the Chipmunks: Chipwrecked: Music from the Motion Picture (2011)	We're the Chipmunks (Music from the TV Show) (2015)	Nuts 2 U (2017); YOLO (2019)

We're the Chipmunks (Music from the TV Show) is the licensed soundtrack based on the Chipmunks 2015 television series ALVINNN!!! and the Chipmunks. It was released as a digital download on September 25, 2015 by Rhino Entertainment. A CD version was released on October 16, 2015. The entire album was written and produced by Ross Bagdasarian Jr. and Janice Karman.

As of 2017, the digital version is unavailable for purchase or streaming. The reason for this is currently unknown. However, CD copies of the album can still be purchased.

== Track listing ==
No.	Title	Performing artist(s)	Length
1.	"We're the Chipmunks"	The Chipmunks	1:01
2.	"Ooh Girl"	The Chipmunks	2:41
3.	"Ring a Ding"	The Chipettes	2:33
4.	"All for You"	The Chipmunks and the Chipettes	2:08
5.	"Champions"	The Chipmunks	2:53
6.	"Mister Manners"	The Chipettes	2:25
7.	"Run the Runway"	The Chipettes	2:48
8.	"Can't Live with 'Em"	The Chipmunks	2:35
9.	"Guest of Honor"	The Chipettes	1:48
10.	"You Gotta Be Cool"	The Chipmunks	2:56
11.	"I See You"	The Chipettes	2:46
12.	"Running All Night"	The Chipmunks	2:52
13.	"The Weekend"	The Chipmunks and the Chipettes	2:19
Total length:			26:44

Deluxe edition: Target exclusive
No.	Title	Artist	Length
14.	"Be a Boss"	The Chipmunks	2:07
15.	"Ridin'"	The Chipmunks	3:01
16.	"Vacationing"	The Chipmunks	3:18
17.	"Everybody Needs a Hero"	The Chipmunks	2:50
