= Alvinnn!!! and the Chipmunks =

French-American children's animated television sitcom series started in 2015

- Also known as: ALVINNN!!! and The Chipmunks
- Genre: Comedy; Musical
- Based on: Alvin and the Chipmunks by Ross Bagdasarian Sr.
- Developed by: Janice Karman
- Directed by: Janice Karman
- Voices of: Ross Bagdasarian Jr. Janice Karman; Michael Bagdasarian; Vanessa Bagdasarian
- Theme music composer: Ross Bagdasarian; Janice Karman
- Opening theme: "We're the Chipmunks"
- Ending theme: "We're the Chipmunks (Instrumental)"
- Composers: Kia Productions; David Vadant; Romain Allender; Patrick Sigwalt; Benjamin Ribolet; Score Factory
- Countries of origin: United States; France
- Original languages: English; French
- No. of seasons: 5
- No. of episodes: 130 (259 segments) (list of episodes)

Production
- Executive producers: Ross Bagdasarian Jr. Janice Karman; Sandrine Nguyen; Boris Hertzog
- Producer: Michael Bagdasarian
- Production locations: Los Angeles, California
- Running time: 22 minutes (11 minutes per segment)
- Production companies: Bagdasarian Productions; Technicolor Animation Productions (Note: Known as OuiDo! Productions for the first season.)

Original release
- Network: M6 (France); Nickelodeon/Nicktoons (United States)
- Release: March 30, 2015 – March 4, 2023

Related
- The Alvin Show(1961–1962); Alvin and the Chipmunks(1983–1990)

Alvinnn!!! and the Chipmunks (stylized as ALVINNN!!! and The Chipmunks) (French: Alvinnn!!! et les Chipmunks) is a children's CGI-animated musical comedy television series developed by Janice Karman. Produced by Bagdasarian Productions and Technicolor Animation Productions (formerly known as OuiDo! Productions in season 1) with the participation of M6, a reboot it features Alvin and the Chipmunks and the Chipettes and marks their first television appearance together since 1990. First announced by Bagdasarian Productions in spring 2010, a promotional trailer for the series was posted on YouTube.

The animation and half of the show's storyboards are handled by Technicolor Productions in France, while Bagdasarian Productions in the United States is in charge of voice recording and music production. The series is primarily distributed by PGS Entertainment, a French brand management company. The series premiered on M6 on March 30, 2015. In August 2015, Nickelodeon acquired the American broadcast rights to the series. It also aired on Teletoon and Family Channel in Canada.

== Plot ==
Simulating an anthology of a famous band, the songwriter Dave Seville is raising the platinum recording groups the Chipmunks (Alvin, Simon, and Theodore) and the Chipettes (Brittany, Jeanette and Eleanor). Dave's patience is tested everyday, but despite all of this, he loves the entire band like his own family. The series takes place in modern society and discusses modern topics such as Dave's technology issues. Others are parents embarrassing kids and parents needing dates.

== Characters ==
=== The Chipmunks and Chipettes ===
- Alvin Seville (voiced by Ross Bagdasarian Jr.) – The leader of the chipmunk trio and a troublemaker and prankster. He is also an unsuccessful hopeless romantic. Whenever he makes trouble or acts annoying, this usually causes Dave or other characters to shout his name. His signature color is red.
- Simon Seville (voiced by Ross Bagdasarian Jr., Michael Bagdasarian [certain lines in "Who's the Animal"]) – The brains and the most mature one of the chipmunk trio. He invents machines and gadgets that can cause chaos whenever Alvin uses them, especially without permission. His signature color is blue.
- Theodore Seville (voiced by Janice Karman) – The heart and the youngest of the chipmunk trio. He has a sweet tooth for candy-based foods like muffins and ice cream. He has a Talking Tom-esque teddy bear called Talking Teddy. Despite being a teenager, he behaves like a young child. His signature color is green.
- Brittany Miller (voiced by Janice Karman) – The leader of the Chipettes and the female counterpart of Alvin. She is very feminine and likes fashion. She can also be really bossy and is shown to despise Alvin due to his rudeness. She works as the principal's assistant at the school the six chipmunks attend. She and her sisters live in a treehouse next to the house Dave and his chipmunk sons reside. Her signature color is pink.
- Jeanette Miller (voiced by Janice Karman) – The female version of Simon. She is very shy, clumsy and has a fondness for nature. She also has an interest in wizardry. Her signature color is purple.
- Eleanor Miller (voiced by Vanessa Bagdasarian) – The female version of Theodore. Unlike her male equivalent, she isn't childish; instead she is tough and likes sports. However, she has an interest in baking. Like her male equivalent, her signature color is also green.

=== Humans ===
- David Seville (voiced by Ross Bagdasarian Jr.) – The Chipmunks' adoptive father, the Chipettes' guardian, songwriter, and manager. Dave's patience is tested nearly every day by Alvin, usually to the point he shouts at him. He can get frustrated with Simon and Theodore too sometimes as Alvin often gets them into mischief, but regardless, he loves all of his boys equally.
- Miss Beatrice Miller (voiced by Janice Karman) – The kindly, absent-minded adoptive mother of the Chipettes who also sometimes takes care of the Chipmunks when Dave's away.
- Miss Smith (voiced by Janice Karman) – The Chipmunks' ill-tempered teacher at school whom Alvin often annoys. She is a grumpy old woman who can't stand Alvin's mischief.
- Officer Dangus (voiced by Michael Bagdasarian) – A policeman who always wears sunglasses.
- Miss Croner (voiced by Janice Karman) – Dave's grouchy neighbour.
- Principal Meadows (voiced by Edwina Jones) – The principal of the school that the Chipmunks and the Chipettes attend. In "Principal Interest", Alvin had romantic feelings for her until finding out she already had a husband. She has a baby nephew according to the episode "Davey Boy".
- Cheesy (voiced by Michael Bagdasarian) – A chubby, awkward student in Alvin's class who often annoys the other characters. He was a background character in Season 1, but becomes a supporting character in later seasons.
- Kevin (voiced by Janice Karman) – A nerdy student in Alvin's class, who is mostly seen around with Cheesy
- Derek Smalls (voiced by Brian Chambers) – Alvin's bully.
- Amber (voiced by Vanessa Bagdasarian) – A valley girl in Alvin's class.
- Bocarter Humphrey (voiced by Michael Bagdasarian) – A posh boy in Alvin's class.

== Voice cast ==
- Ross Bagdasarian Jr. as Alvin, Simon, Dave/David
- Janice Karman as Theodore, Brittany, Jeanette, Miss Smith, Kevin, Miss Croner, Miss Miller, and additional voices
- Vanessa Bagdasarian as Eleanor, Amber, Annie, Neville Humphrey, and additional voices
- Michael Bagdasarian as Cheesy, Bocarter Humphrey, Derek Smalls, Officer Dangus, Simon (additional lines in "Who's the Animal") and additional voices
- Edwina Jones as Principal Meadows
- Elizabeth Gomez as Julie
- Jean Elie as Biggy Large
- Bettina Kenney as additional voices

== Episodes ==
Season	Episodes	Originally released	
Season	Episodes	First released	Last released
1	26	March 30, 2015 (France); August 3, 2015 (U.S.)	November 13, 2015 (France); March 8, 2016 (U.S.)
2	26	November 16, 2015 (France); March 9, 2016 (U.S.)	October 3, 2017 (France); June 3, 2017 (U.S)
3	26	April 6, 2018 (France); June 10, 2017 (U.S.)	March 1, 2019 (France); June 19, 2019 (U.S.)
4	26	August 26, 2019 (France); June 20, 2019 (U.S.)	May 11, 2021 (France); February 22, 2021 (U.S.)
5	26	August 23, 2021 (France); February 23, 2021 (U.S.)	December 1, 2022 (France); March 4, 2023 (U.S.)

== Production ==
The series, originally titled The Chipmunks and Chipettes, has 260 11-minute episodes and is produced in high-definition computer animation, with the Chipmunks and the Chipettes' new looks resembling the iMunk looks. The show serves as an update of the 1980s series utilizing the same theme song, voice actors, Ross Bagdasarian Jr. and Janice Karman, and format with each episode having a song.

The series producers are Ross Bagdasarian Jr., Janice Karman, Sandrine Nguyen, and Boris Hertzog from the American production company Bagdasarian Productions and French company OuiDo! Productions. OuiDo! Productions (now Technicolor Animation Productions) handles the animation and storyboards, with Bagdasarian Productions in charge of voices and music. PGS Entertainment acquired the rights for media outside the United States and France in August 2013 and licensing and merchandising rights in May 2014. On February 24, 2014, Nickelodeon acquired the ordered 104 episodes for all territories except Brazil. It originally also excluded North America, but this was later changed. The series was put on sale at the October 2013 Mipcom and was one of the most-viewed shows there.

In October 2016, the series was renewed for a third and fourth season. In late 2018, the series was renewed for a fifth season. On November 6, 2019, the series was renewed for a sixth and seventh season. However in December 2023, Bagdasarian stated in a phone interview that the series had ended production the year prior, meaning the sixth and seventh seasons were cancelled. In December 2024, PGS Entertainment announced they would distribute the five seasons of the series to Italy, UK and Ireland regions.

== Release ==
=== Broadcast ===
The series made its English-language debut on Nick Jr. in the United Kingdom and Ireland on April 10, 2015 and on Nickelodeon in the United States on August 3. Nicktoons in Africa premiered the show on May 4. The Southeast Asian feed of Nickelodeon debuted the show on May 8 in Singapore and the Philippines and on May 15 in Malaysia. In Brazil, the series premiered on June 15 on Gloob. In English-speaking Canada, it premiered on Teletoon on September 9 and was moved to Family Channel on May 6, 2017. In Arabia, it is currently on Nicktoons and MBC3. It was aired on Pop in the UK on February 1, 2016, but stopped airing in mid-2024. In Indonesia, it is currently airing on MNCTV. In June 2018, it was announced that Alvinnn!!! and the Chipmunks would stream on Hulu. On November 1, 2018, the series premiered on eToonz in South Africa. In July 2020, it aired on Disney Channel in Spain. On September 27, 2021, the show premiered on Disney Channel in Japan.

=== Home video ===
Season 1 Vol. 1 was released on DVD on December 4, 2015. Season 1 Vol. 2 was released on January 26, 2016. Alvin's Wild Adventures was released on DVD and Blu-ray on November 10, 2015 by Bagdasarian Productions. It contains the episodes "Principal Interest", "Talking Teddy", "Mystic Mountain", "A is for Alien", "Clowning Around", "Driving Dave Crazy", and "What a Gem". Alvin vs. Brittany was released on DVD and Blu-Ray on March 1, 2016 by Bagdasarian Productions. It contains the episodes "Sister Act", "Albrittina", "My Sister the Weirdo", "Mister Manners", "Reality or Not", "Turf War", and "Don Juan Theodoro".

== Soundtracks ==
On September 25, 2015, an album based on the television series was released on iTunes, Google Play, Amazon, and CD entitled We're the Chipmunks (Music from the TV Show). On September 22, 2017, a second album based on the series was released on iTunes and Spotify entitled Nuts 2 U. On August 30, 2019, a third album based on the series as released on iTunes and Spotify entitled YOLO.
