= A Chipmunk Christmas =

1981 animated Christmas television special

- Written by: Ross Bagdasarian; Janice Karman
- Directed by: Phil Monroe
- Starring: Ross Bagdasarian Jr. Janice Karman; R.J. Williams
- Music by: Chris Caswell
- Country of origin: United States

Production
- Producers: Ross Bagdasarian; Janice Karman
- Running time: 24 minutes (without commercials)
- Production companies: Bagdasarian Productions; Chuck Jones Enterprises

Original release
- Network: NBC
- Release: December 14, 1981

A Chipmunk Christmas is a 1981 animated Christmas television special based on characters from Alvin and the Chipmunks. Produced by Bagdasarian Productions in association with Chuck Jones Enterprises, it first aired on NBC December 14, 1981, nine years after the death of Alvin and the Chipmunks creator Ross Bagdasarian Sr. (also known as David Seville). This was the first time that Alvin, Simon and David Seville were voiced by Ross Bagdasarian Jr. and the first time that Theodore was voiced by Janice Karman.

== Plot ==
A doctor visits the Waterford family, whose son Tommy is ill. The doctor admits that the chance of Tommy recovering before Christmas is bleak. Meanwhile, the Chipmunks have a recording session. Alvin is not very happy about having to work on Christmas, but after Dave tells him that he can play his prized Golden Echo harmonica, he suggests that Dave can get everything set up in the studio while he and his brothers go window shopping. Dave agrees to this, and tells them not to be late. At the music store, Alvin sees another Golden Echo harmonica, and tells his own harmonica that it's the best harmonica in the world. At that moment, Tommy's mother and sister arrive at the store, and he overhears Tommy's sister tell her mother that if Tommy had the Golden Echo harmonica, it would make him feel better. Alvin feels bad about Tommy's illness, so much that during the recording session, he can't sing in tune with the others. Dave gives the Chipmunks a break, so Alvin visits the Waterfords' house and presents Tommy with his (Alvin's) own harmonica, returning in time to finish the session.

Later, while the Chipmunks are decorating the tree, Simon and Theodore congratulate Alvin for what he did. However, Alvin tells Simon and Theodore that they can't tell Dave, as the harmonica was a gift from him to Alvin, and Alvin fears Dave's feelings would be hurt if he learned what happened. Alvin plans to save his money and buy a new harmonica after Christmas, but when Dave gets a phone call from Carnegie Hall that they want Alvin to play his harmonica on Christmas Eve, Alvin is forced to make a plan to get enough money for a new harmonica. The Chipmunks gather up all the dogs in the neighborhood, and set up a photo booth, where children can have their photo taken with Santa Claus (Alvin). Unfortunately, the presence of a cat draws Dave's attention. As Simon and Theodore are unable to tell him the truth, Dave mistakes Alvin's actions for greed, and sends him to his room. This leads to a dream sequence involving Clyde Crashcup, who says that he has invented Christmas (which is now February 12) and Santa (Abraham Lincoln in a sleigh consisting of a hollowed-out pumpkin pulled by four elephants). Alvin tells him he needs money, and when Dave comes to check up on him, he is saying "money" in his sleep, causing Dave to give up.

On Christmas Eve, two hours before the concert, Simon and Theodore give Alvin the money they have saved up, and wish him luck on buying the harmonica. Upon being asked where Alvin is, they respond that he's not here right now. Luckily, just as Dave is complaining, he gets a phone call from Tommy's mother, who tells him about Alvin's harmonica and the wonders it worked for Tommy. At the music store, Alvin is depressed, as he still doesn't have enough money for a new harmonica. Just then, a mysterious old woman appears, and buys the harmonica for Alvin, only asking for a song in return. Alvin plays a song, but when he finishes, he finds that the woman has disappeared. Dave, Simon, and Theodore arrive, and Dave apologizes to Alvin for mistaking his (Alvin's) actions for greed and tells him they have a surprise for him. At the concert, Alvin learns that Tommy has fully recovered, and he joins the Chipmunks on stage. Santa Claus flies over the city as the Chipmunks sing "We Wish You a Merry Christmas" in the background. Upon returning to the North Pole, he is greeted by his wife, who is revealed to be the same woman who bought Alvin the harmonica.

== Production ==
Following the death of Ross Bagdasarian in 1972, his son Ross Bagdasarian Jr. took over the family business concerns focusing mostly on the real estate and vineyard holdings as Alvin and the Chipmunks was mostly ignored. In 1977, Bagdasarian rediscovered his father's creation and attempted to pitch a revival of The Chipmunks to television networks and record labels but there was no enthusiasm from executives. In 1979, then NBC President Fred Silverman was instrumental in acquiring the rights to rerun The Alvin Show for the 1979–80 Saturday morning television season where it performed adequately. Bagdasarian and his wife, Janice Karman, successfully relaunched the franchise with Chipmunk Punk in 1980 with Urban Chipmunk released the following year. With the success of The Alvin Show reruns and the new albums, NBC committed to ordering a Christmas themed television special for broadcast during the 1981 holiday season. As Kellogg's was fully funding the special, this allowed for more dynamic character animation than the original Alvin series with Chuck Jones producing the special and providing uncredited input into the script by Bagdasarian and Karman.

== Broadcast ==
A Chipmunk Christmas premiered on NBC on December 14, 1981. NBC rebroadcast the special in December of 1982, 1983, 1984, 1985, 1986, 1987, 1988, 1989, and 1990. USA Network would acquire the rights to the special in the 90s and aired the special during the Holiday season beginning in December 1991 with the last broadcast taking place in December 1995. After a 16 year hiatus ABC would acquire the rights to the special in 2011, 2012, and 2013.

== 25th Anniversary Special Collector's Edition ==
A 25th Anniversary Special Edition was released on September 26, 2006, from Bagdasarian Productions and Paramount Home Entertainment. This release was a two-disc DVD/CD set containing A Chipmunk Christmas and its soundtrack album. In addition to the original special, the DVD includes two Christmas-themed episodes of the 1983–1990 television series Alvin and the Chipmunks, "Dave's Wonderful Life" and "Merry Christmas, Mr. Carroll". This DVD was released by Paramount Home Video.

== Voice actors and their characters ==
- Ross Bagdasarian Jr. – Alvin, Simon, David Seville
- Janice Karman – Theodore, Angela Waterford, Cindy Lou
- June Foray – Mrs. Claus, Mrs. Waterford
- Frank Welker – Santa Claus, Doctor
- Charles Berendt – Clyde Crashcup
- R. J. Williams – Tommy Waterford

== Soundtrack album release ==
A Chipmunk Christmas

Soundtrack album by The Chipmunks
- Released: 1981 (US)
- Recorded: 1980
- Genres: Christmas; Children's music
- Label: RCA
- Producers: Janice Karman; Ross Bagdasarian Jr.

The Chipmunks chronology
Urban Chipmunk (1981)	A Chipmunk Christmas (1981)	Chipmunk Rock (1982)

Professional ratings
Review scores
Source	Rating
Allmusic	2/5 stars

A soundtrack album based on the television special was released in 1981. The album serves as the group's third Christmas album and their twelfth album overall.

The album peaked at number 72 on Billboard's Pop Albums Chart and was certified gold by the Recording Industry Association of America, becoming the group's third and final gold album.

Between 1992 and 2001, the album, which was originally released as an LP, was re-released in cassette and Compact Disc formats.

=== Featured songs ===
1. "It's Beginning to Look a Lot Like Christmas"
2. "Chipmunk Jingle Bells"
3. "The Chipmunk Song Take 1"
4. "The Chipmunk Song (Christmas Don't Be Late)"
5. "The Spirit of Christmas"
6. "Have Yourself a Merry Little Christmas"
7. "Crash Cup Invents Christmas"
8. "Here Comes Santa Claus (Right Down Santa Claus Lane)"
9. "Silent Night"
10. "Sleigh Ride"
11. "Deck the Halls"
12. "We Wish You a Merry Christmas"

== Unmade follow-up ==
Contingent upon the special's success, there were plans for another television special which would be built around songs from the album Urban Chipmunk and either be titled Urban Chipmunk or The Chipmunks at Opryland. While A Chipmunk Christmas was successful, the special was ultimately never made. An ongoing series premiered in 1983 with Alvin and the Chipmunks.

== See also ==
- List of Christmas films
