= David Seville =

Fictional human and stage name created by Ross Bagdasarian

- Alvin and the Chipmunks character
- David Seville in The Alvin Show
- First appearance: 1958
- Created by: Ross Bagdasarian
- Portrayed by: Jason Lee (2007, 2009, 2011 and 2015)
- Voiced by: Ross Bagdasarian (1958–72); Ross Bagdasarian Jr. (1979–present)

In-universe information
- Species: Human
- Gender: Male
- Occupation: Record producer, band manager, songwriter
- Family: Toby Seville (cousin once removed); Grandpa Seville (father)
- Children: Alvin, Simon, and Theodore Seville (adoptive sons)
- Nationality: American

David "Dave" Seville is a fictional character; he is the adoptive father, producer and manager of the fictional singing group Alvin and the Chipmunks. The character was created by Ross Bagdasarian, who had used the name "David Seville" as his stage name for songwriting in the 1950s, before the Chipmunk characters were created. One of the records, recorded in 1958 under the David Seville stage name, was "Witch Doctor", featuring a sped-up high-pitched vocal technique. Bagdasarian would later use that technique in "The Chipmunk Song (Christmas Don't Be Late)", which would introduce both Alvin and the Chipmunks as a singing group and Bagdasarian's music producer "Dave". Bagdasarian would go on to create The Alvin Show, based on the Alvin and the Chipmunks group, where he voiced the semi-fictional character David Seville, based largely on himself, with Alvin based on Ross's sometimes rebellious son Adam.

Ross Bagdasarian Jr. took over ownership Bagdasarian Productions when his father died in 1972. He reprised the David Seville character, first in a series of novelty albums beginning with 1980's Chipmunk Punk. Bagdasarian Jr. subsequently assumed the role on the TV series Alvin and the Chipmunks, which ran in original episodes from 1983 to 1990. Bagdasarian Jr. has voiced David Seville in all official animated and recorded incarnations of David Seville since taking over for his father in the 1970s, including TV series, animated specials, and direct-to-video productions. He most recently voiced the character in the 2015 TV show version of the Alvin and the Chipmunks television series.

Actor Jason Lee also portrays David Seville in the live-action films, Alvin and the Chipmunks (2007), Alvin and the Chipmunks: The Squeakquel (2009), Alvin and the Chipmunks: Chipwrecked (2011) and Alvin and the Chipmunks: The Road Chip (2015) which use a combination of live-action acting and computer animation. While Ross Bagdasarian Jr. does not do any voices for the film series, the films are all produced in association with Bagdasarian Productions, which owns the rights to all of the characters.

== Portrayed by ==
Portrayed by	TV series	Film series	Air date	Year	Notes
Ross Bagdasarian	The Alvin Show		1961–1962	1958–1972	Creator
Ross Bagdasarian Jr.	Alvin and the Chipmunks		1983–1990	1979–present	Producer and voice
Ross Bagdasarian Jr.	ALVINNN!!! and the Chipmunks		2015–2023	1979–present	Producer and voice
Jason Lee		Film series	2007–2015		Live action/CGI films

== Filmography ==
=== Films ===
Year	Title	Role	Portrayed by	Production	Producer
1987	The Chipmunk Adventure	Main	Ross Bagdasarian Jr.	Bagdasarian Productions	Ross Bagdasarian Jr.
1999	Alvin and the Chipmunks Meet Frankenstein	Main	Ross Bagdasarian Jr.	Bagdasarian Company; Universal Cartoon Studios	Kathi Castillo
2000	Alvin and the Chipmunks Meet the Wolfman	Main	Ross Bagdasarian Jr.	Bagdasarian Company; Universal Cartoon Studios	Kathi Castillo
2003	Little Alvin and the Mini-Munks	Main	Ross Bagdasarian Jr.	Bagdasarian Company; Paramount Home Video	Ross Bagdasarian Jr.
2006	Alvin and the Chipmunks: Trick or Treason	Main	Ross Bagdasarian Jr.	Bagdasarian Productions	Ross Bagdasarian Jr.
2007	Alvin and the Chipmunks: A Chipmunk Valentine	Main	Ross Bagdasarian Jr.	Bagdasarian Productions	Ross Bagdasarian Jr.
2007	Alvin and the Chipmunks	Main	Jason Lee	Bagdasarian Company; Fox 2000 Pictures; Regency Enterprises	Janice Karman; Ross Bagdasarian Jr.
2009	Alvin and the Chipmunks: The Squeakquel	Main	Jason Lee	Bagdasarian Company; Fox 2000 Pictures; Regency Enterprises	Janice Karman; Ross Bagdasarian Jr.
2011	Alvin and the Chipmunks: Chipwrecked	Main	Jason Lee	Bagdasarian Company; Fox 2000 Pictures; Regency Enterprises	Janice Karman; Ross Bagdasarian Jr.
2015	Alvin and the Chipmunks: The Road Chip	Main	Jason Lee	Bagdasarian Company; Fox 2000 Pictures; Regency Enterprises	Janice Karman; Ross Bagdasarian Jr.

=== Television ===
Year	Title	Role	Voice by	Notes
1961–1962	The Alvin Show	Main	Ross Bagdasarian	October 1961
1983–1990	Alvin and the Chipmunks	Main	Ross Bagdasarian Jr.	Original Series
2015–2023	ALVINNN!!! and the Chipmunks	Main	Ross Bagdasarian Jr.	Started August 2015

== See also ==
- Alvin and the Chipmunks § Main characters
- Ross Bagdasarian § Discography
