= The Alvin Show =

American animated TV series

- Genre: Comedy; Musical; Animated sitcom
- Created by: Ross Bagdasarian Sr.
- Based on: Alvin and the Chipmunks by: Ross Bagdasarian Sr.
- Written by: Ross Bagdasarian Sr.; Jack Cosgriff; Al Bertino; Tedd Pierce; Bill Danch; Chris Jenkyns; Jan Strejan; Dale Hale
- Directed by: Osmond Evans; Rudy Larriva; Alan Zaslove; Gil Turner; Hal Ambro; Jack Kinney
- Voices of: Ross Bagdasarian Sr.; Shepard Menken; June Foray; Lee Patrick; Bill Lee; Johnny Mann; Larry Storch; Mort Marshall; Daws Butler; Paul Frees
- Theme music composer: Ross Bagdasarian Sr.
- Composers: Ross Bagdasarian Sr.; Johnny Mann
- Country of origin: United States
- No. of seasons: 1
- No. of episodes: 26 (104 segments)

Production
- Executive producer: Herbert Klynn
- Producer: Ross Bagdasarian Sr.
- Running time: 25:40 per episode (7 minutes for The Chipmunks and Clyde Crashcup each, 3–4 minutes for both musical segments each)
- Production companies: Bagdasarian Film Corporation; Format Films

Original release
- Network: CBS
- Release: October 4, 1961 – March 28, 1962

Related
- Alvin and the Chipmunks (1983–1990); ALVINNN!!! and the Chipmunks (2015–2023)

The Alvin Show is an American animated television series that aired on CBS in the early 1960s. This was the first series to feature the singing characters Alvin and the Chipmunks. The Alvin Show aired for one season, from October 4, 1961, to March 28, 1962 and was originally sponsored by General Foods through its Jell-O gelatin and Post Cereal brands. Although the series was created in color, it was initially telecast in black and white. It was later rebroadcast in color from 1962–65 for Saturday mornings on CBS and again Saturday mornings on NBC in 1979.

The series rode the momentum of creator Ross Bagdasarian Sr.'s original hit musical gimmick and developed the singing Chipmunk trio as rambunctious kids—particularly the show's namesake star—whose mischief contrasted to his tall, brainy brother Simon and his chubby, gluttonous brother Theodore, as well as their long-suffering, perpetually put-upon manager-father figure, David Seville. The animation was produced by Herbert Klynn's Format Films. The pilot episode, an early version of the fifth episode "Good Neighbor", was written and produced to sell the show to CBS. The actual show featured a re-worked version, which aired as part of the fifth episode. With producer Fred Calvert (who would later work on The Thief and the Cobbler) calling them in, the opening sequence was animated by Bobe Cannon and assistant animated by Iwao Takamoto.

Each episode consisted of a Chipmunks and Clyde Crashcup segment, both of them seven minutes long. Following each segment was a musical number with Dave and the Chipmunks. Most of the songs came from the first three albums that had already been released by the time the show premiered (Let's All Sing with The Chipmunks, Sing Again with The Chipmunks, and Around the World with The Chipmunks). By the second half, all the songs from the new fifth album, The Chipmunk Songbook, were also featured. In addition to the non-album Alvin for President, "Maria from Madrid", which was previously released as a non-Chipmunks B-Side to "Judy" in 1959 under Bagdasarian's stage name of David Seville, and two unreleased Chipmunk covers, "Clementine" and "Jeanie with the Light Brown Hair", rounded out the remaining song segments.

The show was followed in 1983 by another Chipmunks series, Alvin and the Chipmunks which aired on NBC.

== Syndication ==
CBS reran the series on Saturday mornings after the show's prime time run ended in 1962.

In the mid to late 1960s, the individual show segments were culled together and sold as a syndication package under the title Alvin and the Chipmunks. The original episodes began airing under the Alvin and the Chipmunks title on NBC Saturday mornings in 1979 for a short period.

Ross Bagdasarian Sr. died of a heart attack on January 16, 1972, seemingly bringing to an end any further Chipmunk productions. Years later, his son, Ross Jr., picked up on a disc jockey's joke and produced the album Chipmunk Punk in 1980. The success of Chipmunk Punk spurred renewed interest in a new animated series by Ruby-Spears, which launched in September 1983 on NBC and was titled Alvin and the Chipmunks, with Ross Jr. taking over for his father as the voices of Alvin, Simon, and Dave Seville. His wife, Janice Karman, voiced Theodore, as well as The Chipettes, who are the Chipmunks' female counterparts. The show ran until 1990, with episodes after 1988 produced by DIC Entertainment (eleven episodes were produced by Murakami-Wolf-Swenson in association with DIC; these were strictly for a syndication package that included all of the Ruby-Spears produced by episodes).

To coincide with the new series, Viacom Enterprises distributed reruns of The Alvin Show to local (mostly independent and future Fox) stations; the rerun package was also carried nationally over superstations WGN and WTBS at various times beginning in September 1983 and ran for mostly a few years on half of the markets. However, some stations continue to run the show at various times as late as 1993. Prior to its superstation runs, The Alvin Show was picked up in a few markets such as Detroit, New York, Cleveland, and in international markets such as in Australia and Brazil among others. The show made its way to Europe in the United Kingdom when the BBC (now BBC One) began broadcasting the program as well.

In 1981, Clyde Crashcup made an appearance during a dream sequence in A Chipmunk Christmas. During recent network airings of the special, the sequence has been cut out, due to network time constraints concerning commercial ad time.

In 1990, The Alvin Show versions of the Chipmunks and Clyde Crashcup reappeared in an episode of The Chipmunks Go To the Movies titled "Back to Alvin's Future" (a spoof of the 1985 movie, Back to the Future).

A majority of the songs and clips from The Alvin Show were featured in the Alvin and the Chipmunks Sing Along Songs VHS releases that were released in the mid-1990s. The songs, however, were slightly remixed to sound more modern. The only song that kept its original broadcast soundtrack was "Alvin's Orchestra" in the 1993 Sing-Along video Ragtime Cowboy Joe. The Bagdasarian closing logo from the show was also remixed in the 1994 Sing-Along video, Working on the Railroad.

Nickelodeon picked up US broadcast rights to The Alvin Show on March 7, 1994, after the last of a few independent stations pulled the show. The prints from the syndicated reruns were digitized and the Nickelodeon logo was added to several spots in the opening theme. The show aired as part of Nickelodeon's morning lineup for most of the next year.

During this time, as well as for some time after the full episodes stopped airing, the individual Chipmunk and Clyde Crashcup cartoons and musical segments were inserted into episodes of Weinerville. In 1996, Nickelodeon stopped showing The Alvin Show segments altogether and no television station has aired them since then.

== Voice cast ==
- Ross Bagdasarian Sr. - Alvin Seville, Simon Seville, Theodore Seville, David Seville, Sam Valiant, Gondaliero; additional voices
- Shepard Menken - Clyde Crashcup, Neighbor; additional voices
- June Foray - Daisy Bell, Mrs. Frumpington (provides singing voice in "Squares"); additional voices
- Bill Lee - Additional voices
- Johnny Mann - Additional voices
- Lee Patrick - Mrs. Frumpington; additional voices
- Daws Butler - Additional voices
- Larry Storch - Additional voices
- Paul Frees - Additional voices
- Mort Marshall - Additional voices

== Episodes (1961–1962) ==
26 episodes each were produced for the Alvin and the Chipmunks and Clyde Crashcup segments, along with 52 musical segments.

#	The Chipmunks	Musical Segment 1	Clyde Crashcup	Musical Segment 2	Original air date
1	Stanley the Eagle	Oh Gondaliero	Clyde Crashcup Invents Baseball	I Wish I Could Speak French	October 4, 1961
2	Sam Valiant, Private Nose	August Dear	Clyde Crashcup Invents the Bathtub	Alvin's Orchestra	October 11, 1961
3	Squares	Swanee River	Clyde Crashcup Invents the Wife	The Magic Mountain	October 18, 1961
4	Ostrich	The Brave Chipmunks	Clyde Crashcup Invents the Baby	Yankee Doodle	October 25, 1961
5	Good Neighbor	The Little Dog (Oh Where Oh Where Has My Little Dog Gone)	Clyde Crashcup Invents Electricity	Old MacDonald Cha Cha Cha	November 1, 1961
6	Fancy	Japanese Banana	Clyde Crashcup Invents Music	When Johnny Comes Marching Home	November 8, 1961
7	Alvin's Alter Ego	The Pidgin English Hula	Clyde Crashcup Invents the West	Chipmunk Fun	November 15, 1961
8	Sam Valiant, Real Estate	Working on the Railroad	Clyde Crashcup Invents the Stove	Stuck in Arabia	November 22, 1961
9	Camping Trip	Good Morning Song	Clyde Crashcup Invents Jokes	I Wish I Had a Horse	November 29, 1961
10	Overworked Alvin	Witch Doctor	Clyde Crashcup Invents Flight	The Chipmunk Song (Christmas Don't Be Late)	December 6, 1961
11	Dude Ranch	Home on the Range	Clyde Crashcup Invents First Aid	Alvin for President	December 13, 1961
12	Jungle Rhythm	Lily of Laguna	Clyde Crashcup Invents Egypt	Row, Row, Row Your Boat	December 20, 1961
13	Bentley Van Rolls	Swing Low, Sweet Chariot	Clyde Crashcup Invents Self-Preservation	Comin' Thru the Rye	December 27, 1961
14	Good Manners	Bicycle Built for Two	Clyde Crashcup Invents Physical Fitness	Ragtime Cowboy Joe	January 3, 1962
15	Little League	Buffalo Gals	Clyde Crashcup Invents the Chair	While Strolling in the Park One Day	January 10, 1962
16	Hillbilly Son	Spain	Clyde Crashcup Invents the Bed	Pop Goes the Weasel	January 17, 1962
17	Alvin's Cruise	Alvin's Harmonica	Clyde Crashcup Invents the Telephone	If You Love Me (Alouette)	January 24, 1962
18	Lovesick Dave	Coming 'Round the Mountain	Clyde Crashcup Invents the Time Machine	The Three Blind-Folded Mice	January 31, 1962
19	Eagle In Love	Sing a Goofy Song	Clyde Crashcup Invents Do it Yourself	Twinkle, Twinkle, Little Star	February 7, 1962
20	Theodore's Dog	Clementine	Clyde Crashcup Invents the Shoe	Maria from Madrid	February 14, 1962
21	Haunted House	Whistle While You Work	Clyde Crashcup Invents Glass	My Wild Irish Rose	February 21, 1962
22	Alvin's Studio	Jeanie with the Light Brown Hair	This is Your Life, Clyde Crashcup!	The Band Played On	February 28, 1962
23	The Whistler	The Alvin Twist	Clyde Crashcup Invents the Boat	The Man on the Flying Trapeze	March 7, 1962
24	Sir Alvin	Git Along, Little Dogies	Clyde Crashcup Invents Crashcupland	Down in the Valley	March 14, 1962
25	Disc Jockey	Funiculì, Funiculà	Clyde Crashcup Invents Birthdays	Polly Wolly Doodle	March 21, 1962
26	Eagle Music	On Top of Old Smoky	Clyde Crashcup Invents Self-Defense	America the Beautiful	March 28, 1962

General Foods was the show's main sponsor; as such, Dave Seville and The Chipmunks appeared in several humorous half-minute commercials for Jell-O and Post Cereals.

== Home media ==
In 1993-94, Buena Vista Home Video released the home video series Alvin and the Chipmunks Sing Alongs, featuring musical segments from The Alvin Show. Both videos in this series have never been released to DVD.

However, on September 8, 2009, Paramount Home Entertainment released the first episode of the show, along with two "modern" specials. In 2014, "The Brave Chipmunks" musical sequence was released as a bonus feature on The Chipmunk Adventure Blu-ray and DVD combo pack. In 2015, three complete episodes (#01, #04, and #10) were released together as The Alvin Show on Blu-ray and DVD.

== International broadcast ==
- Australia
  - Network Ten (1973 & 1997-2001)
  - Nickelodeon (2002-2004)
- Canada
  - CBMT (1966)
- Chile
  - TVN (1969–1973 & 1975–1979)
- Russia
  - Channel One Russia (1992–1996)
  - Russia-1 (1996–1998)
- United Kingdom
  - BBC (1962)
  - Nickelodeon (1995–1997)
  - Cartoon Network (1997–2000)
  - Toon Disney (2000–2004)
- Italy
  - Hiro (1980)
  - Italia 7 (1980)
- Brazil (Unconfirmed)
  - TV Rio (1968)
  - Record TV (1969)
  - TV Piratini (1970)

=== Syndicated stations ===
  - WTBS-TV - Atlanta, Georgia
  - WGN-TV - Chicago, Illinois
  - WNEW-TV - New York City (first station to run the show as a syndicated series on weekday afternoons in 1965, shortly before CBS cancelled its run as a Saturday Morning program)
  - KTVU-TV - San Francisco, California
  - WSFL-TV - Miami, Florida
  - WXIX-TV - Cincinnati, Ohio
  - KXTX-TV - Dallas, Texas
  - WVTV-TV - Milwaukee, Wisconsin
  - WGBS-TV - Philadelphia, Pennsylvania
  - WXNE-TV - Boston, Massachusetts
  - WTXX-TV - Hartford, Connecticut
  - WTOP-TV - Washington, District of Columbia (aired on Sunday mornings from January until September 1970)
  - WFTY-TV - Washington, District of Columbia
  - WPTT-TV - Pittsburgh, Pennsylvania
  - WTTE-TV - Columbus, Ohio
  - WKBF-TV - Cleveland, Ohio
  - WOIO-TV - Cleveland, Ohio (aired weekday mornings in the mid-1980s)
  - WKBD-TV - Detroit, Michigan
  - WPTF-TV - Raleigh, North Carolina (aired on Sundays in the mid-1980s)
  - KZKC-TV - Kansas City, Missouri
  - WISH-TV - Indianapolis, Indiana (ran as a syndicated program before CBS's Saturday Morning block in the early 1990s)
  - WFTS-TV - Tampa, Florida
  - WTZA-TV - Kingston, New York
  - WOLF-TV - Scranton, Pennsylvania
  - WSAZ-TV - Huntington, West Virginia (ran as a syndicated program before NBC's Saturday Morning block in the early-1980s)
  - KLRT-TV - Little Rock, Arkansas
