= Clyde Crashcup =

Character from The Alvin Show

- Alvin and the Chipmunks character
- First appearance: The Alvin Show (1961)
- Last appearance: The Chipmunks Go to the movies (1990)
- Created by: Ross Bagdasarian
- Voiced by: Shepard Menken (1961–1962, 1990); Charles Berendt (A Chipmunk Christmas)

In-universe information
- Gender: Male
- Occupation: Scientist; Technician

Clyde Crashcup is a fictional character from the early 1960s animated television series The Alvin Show. He is a scientist in a white coat who tends to "invent" things that have already been invented; his experiments invariably fail. He usually invented by penciling the concept in air, with the picture becoming the actual object. The character has also appeared in comics and other Alvin and the Chipmunks works after The Alvin Show.

== Creation ==
Clyde Crashcup was created by Ross Bagdasarian. He is voiced by Shepard Menken mimicking the enunciation of Richard Haydn's nasal-voiced character Edwin Carp. He is also drawn as a caricature of Richard Haydn. Clyde had one of the four segments of each episode of The Alvin Show, and the Chipmunks starred in the other three (two of which were musical segments).

== Character details ==
Crashcup is a scientist in a white coat whose experiments invariably fail. His was the only voice heard in many of the episodes because the other main character in the series was his assistant Leonardo, who only whispered into Clyde's ear. (Note: In one episode, Clyde invented a wife, who is voiced by June Foray—portrayer of Rocket J. Squirrel in Rocky and Bullwinkle, among many characters. In the episode "Crashcup Invents the Birthday Party", Foray provided the (all too audible) voice for the mother of Crashcup's inaudible assistant Leonardo.)

Clyde Crashcup was primarily an inventor rather than a researcher, although he tended to "invent" things that had already been invented. However, in one episode, he built a functioning time machine. He typically would invent something by taking a pencil out of his lab coat's pocket and drawing a picture in midair of his conception: the picture would then become the actual object.

Clyde's catchphrase was to break down the name of his invention into its metonymic elements to explain his thought process. For example, when asked to justify the invention of the telephone, he would say "That's 'tele-' for tele and '-phone' for phone: telephone."

In one episode, Clyde invented a wife, voiced by June Foray.

== Other media ==
- Dell Comics published 5 issues of a "Clyde Crashcup" comic book from Aug-Oct 1963 to Sept-Nov 1964. During a period spanning parts of 1963 and 1964, Dell also published a 12¢ and a 25¢ comic book titled "Alvin and His Pals in Merry Christmas with Clyde Crashcup and Leonardo", in which Clyde and Leonardo appear throughout. All were written by John Stanley.
- In 1981, Crashcup appeared in the TV special A Chipmunk Christmas, in a dream sequence. Crashcup tells Alvin that he has just invented Christmas and Santa Claus. True to Crashcup's earlier appearances, his Christmas is on February 12, and his Santa is shown to be Abraham Lincoln in a hollowed-out pumpkin that is pulled by four elephants. This scene has been removed from some later airings to allow for more commercial breaks. Charles Berendt provided the voice of Clyde Crashcup in the special.
- Crashcup later had a special guest spot in the modern Alvin and the Chipmunks 1990 episode "Back to Our Future", in which he showed up in the time of the new show with a time machine and brought the modern Chipmunks back to his time, where they temporarily switched places with The Alvin Show Chipmunks. It was later released on VHS on April 14, 1994, as Back to Alvin's Future.
- In the 2000 film Alvin and the Chipmunks Meet the Wolfman, the Chipmunks and the Chipettes attend Clyde C. Crashcup Elementary School, a school apparently named after him.

== Episodes (1961–1962) ==
#	Clyde Crashcup	Original air date
1	Clyde Crashcup Invents Baseball	October 4, 1961
2	Clyde Crashcup Invents the Bathtub	October 11, 1961
3	Clyde Crashcup Invents the Wife	October 18, 1961
4	Clyde Crashcup Invents the Baby	October 25, 1961
5	Clyde Crashcup Invents Electricity	November 1, 1961
6	Clyde Crashcup Invents Music	November 8, 1961
7	Clyde Crashcup Invents the West	November 15, 1961
8	Clyde Crashcup Invents the Stove	November 22, 1961
9	Clyde Crashcup Invents Jokes	November 29, 1961
10	Clyde Crashcup Invents Flight	December 6, 1961
11	Clyde Crashcup Invents First Aid	December 13, 1961
12	Clyde Crashcup Invents Ancient Egypt	December 20, 1961
13	Clyde Crashcup Invents Self-Preservation	December 27, 1961
14	Clyde Crashcup Invents Physical Fitness	January 3, 1962
15	Clyde Crashcup Invents the Chair	January 10, 1962
16	Clyde Crashcup Invents the Bed	January 17, 1962
17	Clyde Crashcup Invents the Telephone	January 24, 1962
18	Clyde Crashcup Invents the Time Machine	January 31, 1962
19	Clyde Crashcup Invents Do-It Yourself	February 7, 1962
20	Clyde Crashcup Invents the Shoe	February 14, 1962
21	Clyde Crashcup Invents Glass	February 21, 1962
22	This is Your Life, Clyde Crashcup!	February 28, 1962
23	Clyde Crashcup Invents the Boat	March 7, 1962
24	Clyde Crashcup Invents Crashcupland	March 14, 1962
25	Clyde Crashcup Invents Birthdays	March 21, 1962
26	Clyde Crashcup Invents Self-Defense	March 28, 1962
