= Bagdasarian Productions =

American film production company

Bagdasarian Productions, LLC
- Logo used since 2013
- Formerly: Bagdasarian Film Corporation
- Type: Private
- Industry: Entertainment
- Founded: February 20, 1961; 65 years ago
- Founder: Ross Bagdasarian Sr.
- Headquarters: Montecito, California, U.S.
- Products: Film production, television production
- Brands: The Chipmunks; Dave Seville; The Chipettes
- Owner: Ross Bagdasarian Sr. (1961–1972); Ross Bagdasarian Jr.; (1972–present); Janice Karman (1972–present); Big Shot Pictures (2026–present; 25%)

Bagdasarian Productions (also credited as Bagdasarian Company) is an American production company founded by Ross Bagdasarian Sr. (also known as David Seville) on February 20, 1961. The company holds the rights to Alvin and the Chipmunks and related intellectual property assets. The company is currently owned and operated by Ross Bagdasarian Jr., Janice Karman and Big Shot Pictures. The company has co-produced many television series, specials, and films and initiated multiple lawsuits to protect the characters.

In July 2026, former Nickelodeon and Paramount CEO Brian Robbins’ entertainment company Big Shot Pictures, acquired a 25% stake in Bagdasarian Productions. He plans to revive the franchise through short-form social media content as a launchpad for a new movie expected in late 2028.

== Filmography ==
=== Television shows ===
Series number	Title	Broadcast run	Original channel	Total # episodes	Total # seasons
1	The Alvin Show	1961–1962	CBS	26 episodes	1
2	Alvin and the Chipmunks	1983–1990	NBC	102 episodes	8
3	Alvinnn!!! and the Chipmunks	2015–2023	M6, Nickelodeon France (France); Nickelodeon (U.S.)	130 episodes	5

=== Television specials ===
- A Chipmunk Christmas (1981)
- I Love the Chipmunks Valentine Special (1984)
- A Chipmunk Reunion (1985)
- Rockin' Through the Decades (1990)
- Alvin and the Chipmunks: Trick or Treason (1994)
- A Chipmunk Celebration (1994)
- The Easter Chipmunk (1995)

=== Feature films ===
- The Chipmunk Adventure (1987)
- Alvin and the Chipmunks Meet Frankenstein (1999)
- Alvin and the Chipmunks Meet the Wolfman (2000)
- Little Alvin and the Mini-Munks (2003)
- Alvin and the Chipmunks (2007)
- Alvin and the Chipmunks: The Squeakquel (2009)
- Alvin and the Chipmunks: Chipwrecked (2011)
- Alvin and the Chipmunks: The Road Chip (2015)

== Lawsuits ==
=== Main ===
==== Universal Studios, Inc. (2000) ====
Bagdasarian Productions sued for a payment of $100 million for a breach of contract. Bagdasarian Productions claimed that the entertainment company never intended to honor the agreement to promote the characters within family entertainment and animation arms. Bagdasarian Productions won their suit and regained control of the Alvin and the Chipmunks characters in 2002.

==== Capitol Records, Inc. (2008–2011) ====
===== Part One: (2008, 2010) =====
Bagdasarian Productions sued Capitol Records for using Alvin and the Chipmunks' music without the permission of the production company. The licensing agreement, which gave Liberty Records (whose catalog was acquired by Capitol Records in 1979) the right to manufacture and distribute songs, was signed in 1968 (about four years before Ross Bagdasarian Sr.'s death) and was not seen again until 2007. Bagdasarian Productions claimed that the recording company had been making money on pre-1972 songs sung by The Chipmunks' outside of the music industry in films, television, and other ventures in violation of specific contractual language. Though Capitol Records initially won the case, the decision was reversed in 2010 when Bagdasarian appealed. The appellate court held that the productions company has the exclusive right to perform the recordings.

===== Part Two: (2011) =====
Bagdasarian Productions sued for payment from (2005–09) of royalties because of a breach of contract. According to the suit, Capitol Records sent royalties to The Harry Fox Agency Inc., Bagdasarian Productions' former agent, who sent them back since the agency wasn't representing them anymore. The record company allegedly pocketed this portion of royalties for Bagdasarian Productions. The productions company claimed approximately $0.09 per song reproduced or distributed during the four years was due.

==== 20th Century Fox (2010–2012) ====
Bagdasarian Productions sued for payment associated with Janice Karman's contributions to the script of the second CGI/live-action film Alvin and the Chipmunks: The Squeakquel. Fox asked Karman to re-write the screenplay after the company was dissatisfied with their writer's initial draft. She sought 50 percent of the movie's profits. Additionally, Bagdasarian Productions claimed a breach of contract due to Fox licensing the film to HBO, decreasing possible revenue, and underpaid royalties on the film's soundtrack, the Alvin and the Chipmunks' soundtrack, and other merchandise. All claims ruled in favor of Fox.

=== Minor ===
==== St. Clair Entertainment Group, Inc. (2009) ====
Bagdasarian Productions sued St. Clair Entertainment Group for allegedly advertising and selling an infringing music album entitled A Tribute to Alvin and the Chipmunks online and in retail stores under the false notion that the album was authorized, endorsed by, associated, or affiliated with the productions company. Not only did the album use artwork that closely resembled The Chipmunks (credited as The Chipper Three) and the Alvin and the Chipmunks trademark logo, it also contained the same ten songs available on the release. The District Court issued an injunction against further production, distribution, marketing, and exploitation of products with the Alvin and the Chipmunks logos.

==== Big Eye Records (2009) ====
Bagdasarian Productions sued Big Eye Records, a Los Angeles production company, and (among others) Orchard Enterprises, a New York distributor, for allegedly producing and selling an infringing music album entitled Renditions of Alvin & the Chipmunks by Calvin & the Chipmunk Rock Stars online as a cheap knockoff of the Alvin and the Chipmunks: Original Motion Picture Soundtrack. This album not only used the Alvin and the Chipmunks trademark but also contained twelve identical songs from the original release. Bagdasarian Productions also sought damages of no less than $1 million. The District Court issued an injunction against any further production, distribution, marketing, and exploitation of products containing the Alvin and the Chipmunks logos.

==== Jerry Naylor Company, LLC (2011) ====
Bagdasarian Productions sued the Jerry Naylor Company, based in Oregon, Megabop Records, based in London, and San Juan Music Group, based in New Jersey, for allegedly selling an infringing music album entitled A Tribute to Alvin and the Chipmunks online as a cheap knockoff of the Alvin and the Chipmunks: Original Motion Picture Soundtrack. Bagdasarian Productions also sought damages of no less than $1 million. The parties in question settled before giving a ruling.
