= Big Shot Pictures =

American entertainment studio

- Type: Private
- Industry: Animation
- Founded: January 27, 2026; 9 months ago
- Founder: Brian Robbins
- Headquarters: Los Angeles, California U.S
- Owner: Sony Pictures (minority)
- Subsidiaries: Bagdasarian Productions (25%)
- Website: bigshotpictures.com

Big Shot Pictures is an American animation company based in Los Angeles, California. The company was founded in 2026 by former Paramount Global CEO Brian Robbins.

== Filmography ==
=== Film ===
Year	Title	Director	Distributor	Notes
2028	Untitled Alvin and the Chipmunks reboot	TBA	Sony Pictures Releasing	Co-production with Bagdasarian Productions
2029	Untitled Cookie Run film	TBA	Sony Pictures Releasing	Co-production with Devsisters

=== Television ===
Title	Creator	Year	Network	Notes
Eloise and Adley	TBA	2026	YouTube	Co-production with Spacestation Animation
IShowSpeed (anime series)	TBA	TBA	TBA	Co-production with IShowSpeed
Untitled Bucket List Family series	TBA	TBA	TBA	
