= Shepard Menken =

American actor (1921–1999)

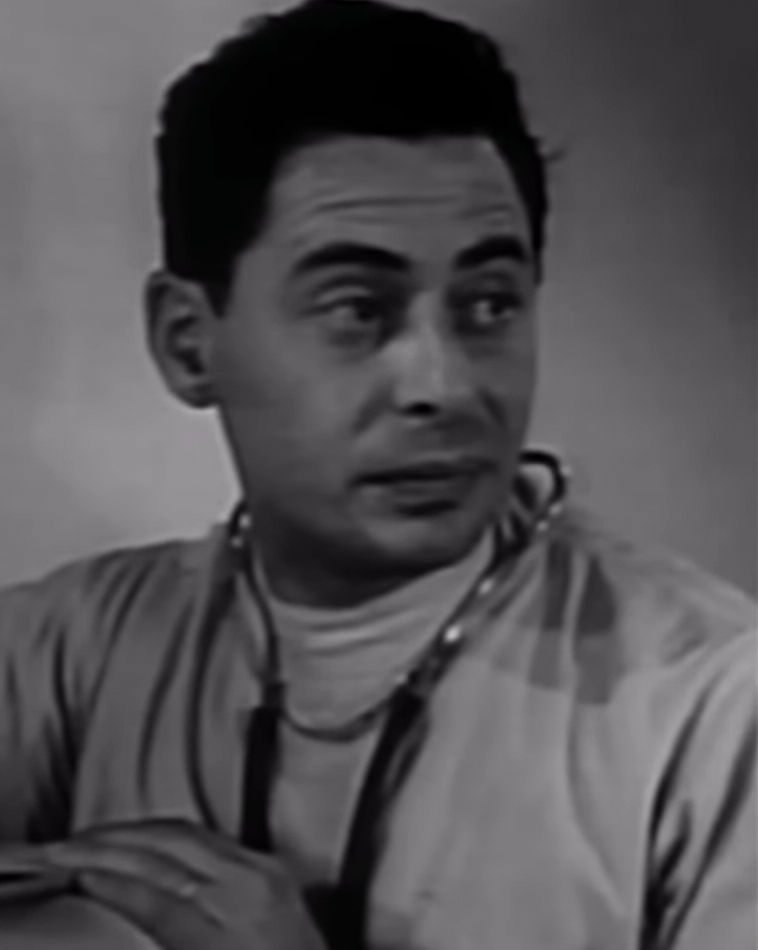
- Menken in Killers from Space (1954)
- Born: November 2, 1921; New York City, U.S.
- Died: January 2, 1999 (aged 77); Woodland Hills, California, U.S.
- Resting place: Mount Sinai Memorial Park Cemetery
- Occupations: Radio, film, television and voice actor
- Years active: 1949–1990
- Television: The Alvin Show (1960–90)

Shepard Menken (November 2, 1921 – January 2, 1999) was an American character and voice actor.

== Early life ==
Menken began his career at the age of 11, when he started appearing on children's radio programs. After high school, Menken attended Columbia University, and later studied performing arts at the Neighborhood Playhouse Theatre and the Juilliard School of Music.

== Career ==
Menken made his film debut in 1949 with a supporting role in The Red Menace, and eventually appeared onscreen in 17 movies. Menken worked steadily as a television actor, appearing on such series as I Love Lucy, I Spy, and The Wild Wild West. He was also in demand as a voice talent, working on animated cartoons for Hanna-Barbera, UPA, and Marvel Productions, as well as advertising spots for StarKist Tuna and Mattel Toys; his was the voice intoning, "The only way to fly!" in Western Airlines' spots in the 1960s. Menken voiced Clyde Crashcup in The Alvin Show, as well as the character Tonto in the 1966-69 animated series The Lone Ranger. He also voiced the Spelling Bee and Chroma the Great in the 1970 live-action/animated film The Phantom Tollbooth, and provided the voice for the title character in Rikki-Tikki-Tavi. In 1963, Menken formed his own company, Malibu Films, which specialized in educational and industrial films.

== Death ==
Menken died on January 2, 1999 at the Motion Picture & Television Hospital in Woodland Hills, Los Angeles at the age of 77. He is interred at Mount Sinai Memorial Park Cemetery in Simi Valley, California.

== Selected filmography ==
- The Great Caruso (1951) as Fucito
- I Love Lucy (1951) Season 1 Episode 12, "The Adagio", as Jean Val Jean Raymond
- David and Bathsheba (1951) as Police Guard (uncredited)
- Tangier Incident (1953)
- Captain John Smith and Pocahontas (1953) as Natanquas
- Killers From Space (1953) as Major Clift
- I Love Lucy (1953) Season 3 Episode 11, "Lucy Has Her Eyes Examined", as the optometrist (billed as "Shep Menken")
- King Richard and the Crusaders (1954) as Muezzin (uncredited)
- Bengal Brigade (1954) as Bulbir
- The Benny Goodman Story (1956) as Harry Goodman
- The Alvin Show (1961) as Clyde Crashcup
- Take A Look At Yourself (1970) (16mm educational film) - Producer
