= The Chipmunk Adventure =

1987 animated film by Janice Karman

- Theatrical release poster
- Directed by: Janice Karman
- Written by: Janice Karman; Ross Bagdasarian
- Based on: Alvin and the Chipmunks by Ross Bagdasarian Sr.
- Produced by: Ross Bagdasarian
- Starring: The Chipmunks; The Chipettes
- Edited by: Tony Mizgalski
- Music by: Randy Edelman
- Production company: Bagdasarian Productions
- Distributed by: The Samuel Goldwyn Company
- Release date: May 22, 1987
- Running time: 78 minutes
- Country: United States
- Language: English
- Box office: $6.8 million

The Chipmunk Adventure is a 1987 American animated musical comedy film featuring the Alvin and the Chipmunks characters created by Ross Bagdasarian Sr. The film, produced concurrently with the 1983 animated series, was directed by Janice Karman and written by Karman and Ross Bagdasarian Jr. The plot follows the Chipmunks and the Chipettes as they go on a hot air balloon race around the world while their guardian David Seville is out on a trip, not knowing that it is a cover for a diamond smuggling ring operated by Claudia and Klaus Furschtein.

After the success of the Alvin and the Chipmunks television series on NBC, several companies had been interested in financing an Alvin and the Chipmunks film. Bagdasarian Jr. and Karman decided to finance the movie themselves. Animators from The Black Cauldron (1985) worked on the film after its box-office flop caused many animators to get laid off from Walt Disney Feature Animation. The animation was provided overseas to several regions such as Utah and Canada. Randy Edelman composed the music after he was visited by Bagdasarian Jr. in London. Production of the film lasted for a year to be completed.

The Chipmunk Adventure was released on May 22, 1987, and grossed $6.8 million at the box office, making it a box office disappointment. The film initially received mixed reviews from critics. Most critics praised the animation, visuals, and soundtrack, but the plot and voices of the Chipmunks and Chipettes were polarizing. The film's reliance on racial stereotyping was also criticized. Retrospective reviews of the film became more positive. It was the Chipmunks' first theatrical film; the franchise's second theatrical film, Alvin and the Chipmunks, was released on December 14, 2007, 20 years after the film came out.

== Plot ==
When Dave Seville goes to Europe on a business trip, the Chipmunks—Alvin, Simon, and Theodore—are left home in Los Angeles with their babysitter, Miss Miller. Later, the Chipmunks and Chipettes—Brittany, Jeanette, and Eleanor—play an arcade game Around the World in 30 Days, and Alvin and Brittany argue over which would win a real race around the world after Brittany wins the game. They are overheard by international diamond-smuggling siblings Klaus and Claudia Furschtein, who have $5 million worth of diamonds to distribute to buyers but no couriers who are unknown to their nemesis, Jamal. Claudia tricks the Chipmunks and the Chipettes into being unwitting mules, offering to arrange a real race around the world between the Chipmunks and Chipettes for a $100,000 prize. To participate, Alvin records a phone call to Dave and edits it to trick Ms. Miller into believing that Dave wants the Chipmunks to meet him in Europe.

The two teams set off by hot air balloon, each given a different route and twelve dolls made in their likenesses, which they are to exchange at designated locations for dolls in the likenesses of the other team to confirm they visited the locations. Unbeknownst to them, their dolls are filled with diamonds, and those they are receiving contain cash. The Furschteins' butler, Mario, is secretly an informant for Jamal, who dispatches two of his men Sisman and Cuomo to acquire the dolls. The Chipmunks' first stop is Mexico City, where they join in a fiesta. In Bermuda, the Chipettes scuba dive to make their first exchange in the sunken ship and Brittany is almost eaten by a great white shark. The Chipmunks and Chipettes continue their journeys, exchanging their dolls in various countries along the way. Jamal's men tail them, but fail to get the dolls due to various mishaps. The Chipmunks and the Chipettes cross paths in Athens, where they try to outperform one another in a musical number at the Acropolis and are almost spotted by Dave.

Frustrated by his men's failures, Jamal enlists the aid of a young sheikh who has his mercenaries capture the Chipettes in Giza. Rather than turn them over to Jamal, the young prince desires instead to keep Jeanette and Eleanor and marry Brittany, much to her chagrin, and gifts her a homesick baby penguin. The Chipettes perform a song to charm the cobras guarding their dolls, escape in their hot air balloon, and detour to Antarctica to return the baby penguin to its family. Learning that they have deviated from their expected route, Claudia sends her thugs after them. The Chipettes escape with the penguins helping them, but discover the diamonds and cash inside the dolls, realize they have been deceived and set out to find the Chipmunks.

Meanwhile, the Chipmunks take a shortcut through a jungle, where they are captured by a native tribe who name Theodore their "Prince of Plenty" and force Alvin and Simon to be his slaves. They soon learn that Theodore and soon themselves are to be sacrificed by being dropped into a pit of crocodiles on a full moon. By performing the song "Wooly Bully" to entertain the natives, they stall their sacrifice and are rescued by the Chipettes.

Claudia discovers Mario passing information to Jamal, who is revealed to be an Interpol Inspector. The Chipmunks and the Chipettes land at Los Angeles International Airport at the same time as Dave's returning flight, and are chased by the Furschteins, who get them to surrender by lying that they have kidnapped Ms. Miller. Dave sees them being taken away in the Furschteins' car, and joins Jamal in pursuit. Ms. Miller is absentmindedly driving the wrong way on a one-way street on her way to pick up Dave, and accidentally runs the Furschteins off the road. They get arrested by Jamal, and the Chipmunks and the Chipettes are reunited with Dave. Alvin and Brittany argue over who won the race, much to Dave and Mrs. Miller's frustration.

== Voice cast ==
- Ross Bagdasarian Jr. as Alvin, Simon, and David Seville
- Janice Karman as Theodore Seville, Brittany, Jeanette, and Eleanor Miller
- Dody Goodman as Miss Miller
- Susan Tyrrell as Claudia Furschtein
- Anthony De Longis as Klaus Furschtein
- Frank Welker as Sophie, Baby Penguin, Native Chief, and additional voices
- Ken Sansom as Inspector Jamal
- Nancy Cartwright as the Arabian prince

== Production ==
=== Origin and development ===
After the success of the animated cartoon series on NBC, several studios were interested in financing the movie based on Alvin and the Chipmunks. The idea originated while Ross Bagdasarian Jr. and Janice Karman built successful doghouses. Although Janice disliked the idea of creating and financing the movie themselves, they shortly found the film's director. The unknown director created story sketches that set the tone of the film. Two months after production started, the unknown director was replaced by Karman, who was pregnant with her first child at the time. Karman was initially reluctant about being a director of the film.

=== Animation ===
The box-office failure of Disney's The Black Cauldron in 1985 had led to the layoff of a number of Walt Disney Feature Animation animators (such as Glen Keane, Dan Haskett and Dave Pruiksma), whom Bagdasarian promptly hired to work on the film.

After sending the first part of the film to be animated overseas, Bagdasarian Jr. and Karman only received six seconds of animation several months later and five minutes of animation a year later. It was due to the animators suffering from "sore hands." As a result, they hired another 150 animators to finish the film. Within nine months before the film's release, they sent animation to Canada, New York City, Utah, Spain, and South Korea. Several parts that were difficult to animate or not close enough to be completed were cut from the script. Locations cut in the film include San Diego Zoo, Barbados, London, England, Rio de Janeiro, Brazil, Rome, Italy and Moscow, Russia (then known as Soviet Union during development).

=== Music ===
The Chipmunk Adventure: Original Motion Picture Soundtrack

Soundtrack album by the Chipmunks and the Chipettes
- Released: 1987
- Genres: Pop; rock; children's music
- Label: Buena Vista Records
- Producers: Ross Bagdasarian Jr. Janice Karman

The Chipmunks and the Chipettes chronology
| Songs from Our TV Shows (1984) | The Chipmunk Adventure: Original Motion Picture Soundtrack (1987) | The Chipmunks and the Chipettes: Born to Rock (1988) |

Before the film's release, Bagdasarian Jr. visited London to hire composer Randy Edelman and the London Philharmonic Orchestra to score the film. This film marks Randy Edelman’s theatrical film debut. The soundtrack of The Chipmunk Adventure was performed by the Chipmunks and the Chipettes and includes a mix of original tunes and covers. Several songs throughout the film were performed by both the Chipmunks and the Chipettes. The soundtrack was originally done as a promotional tie-in to the film. The soundtrack was originally released by Buena Vista Records. On March 17, 1998, the soundtrack was released on CD by MCA Records. The CD was a bonus included on the VHS re-release of the film by Universal Studios Home Video. On April 1, 2008, the soundtrack was re-released on CD as a bonus of the film's special edition DVD re-release.

==== Track listing ====
Side one
| No. | Title | Writer(s) | Performer(s) | Length |
|---|---|---|---|---|
| 1. | "Chipmunk Adventure Theme" | Randy Edelman | London Philharmonic Orchestra |
| 2. | "I, Yi, Yi, Yi, Yi/Cuanto le Gusta" | Mack Gordon; Harry Warren; Gabriel Ruiz; Ray Gilbert | The Chipmunks |
| 3. | "Off to See the World" | Randy Edelman | The Chipmunks & The Chipettes |
| 4. | "Weekend in France, Italy, England, Amsterdam, Greece..." | Edelman; Ross Bagdasarian Jr.; Janice Karman | The Chipmunks |
| 5. | "My Mother" | Randy Goodrum | The Chipettes |
| 6. | "Wooly Bully" | Domingo Samudio | The Chipmunks |

Side two
| No. | Title | Writer(s) | Performer(s) | Length |
|---|---|---|---|---|
| 1. | "The Girls of Rock 'n' Roll" | Jay Levy; Terry Shaddick | The Chipmunks & The Chipettes |
| 2. | "Flying with the Eagles" | Edelman | The Chipmunks & The Chipettes |
| 3. | "Getting Lucky" | Barry DeVorzon | The Chipettes |
| 4. | "Mexican Holiday" | Edelman; Bagdasarian Jr. | The Chipmunks |
| 5. | "Diamond Dolls" | Donna Weiss; Elysee Alexander | The Chipettes |

== Release and promotion ==
On February 28, 1986, the film was announced to be scheduled for a 1986 release. The film was shown one year before its release, at the 1986 Cannes Film Festival. The film was originally scheduled to be released in December 1986, but the film was still in-production at the time. The Chipmunk Adventure officially released on May 22, 1987 by The Samuel Goldwyn Company.

According to Anne Thompson of The Orange County Register, it was initially predicted to outperform The Care Bears Movie, which was the most successful release distributed by The Samuel Goldwyn Company at the time. However, The Samuel Goldwyn Company spent $15 million to promote and market the film, compared to $24 million for The Care Bears Movie. (Note: According to the 1985 edition of Guinness Film Facts and Feats, the publicity budget of $24 million for its marketing of The Care Bears Movie was the largest publicity budget at the time.) Promotional tie-ins include Burger King, French's, and the film's soundtrack. The Goldwyn staff decided that it would appeal to both younger and older audiences, including the audience for The Care Bears Movie. The Chipmunk Adventure opened at No. 6 at the United States and Canadian box office on its first weekend, grossing at $2.6 million from 916 venues. The film grossed $6.8 million in the U.S. and Canada alone.

=== Home media ===
The film was first officially released on VHS on November 18, 1987, by Lorimar Home Video, pricing at $79.95. It first appeared on Billboard's Top Kid Video Sales chart on the week of December 19, 1998, although it debuted at No. 25 a week earlier. As of February 9, 1991, the film's original home video release was already re-released by Warner Home Video, reducing to the price of $19.98. The film got a new re-release on March 17, 1998, by Universal Studios Home Video for the 40th anniversary of Alvin and the Chipmunks, pricing at $19.98. It included a free coloring book activity, CD-ROM, and the CD of the soundtrack by MCA Records. It debuted at No. 30 on Billboard's Top Video Sales chart on the week of April 11, 1998. A week later, the re-release debuted at No. 14 on Billboard's Top Kid Video chart. The re-release entered the top 10 on Billboard's Top Kid Video chart on the week of May 2, 1998.

On May 23, 2006, the film was released on DVD by Paramount Home Entertainment, pricing at $14.99. Bonus features include original artwork and story panels. A special edition DVD re-release of the film with a bonus CD (which is the same soundtrack disc) was released on April 1, 2008, which matches that of the live-action/animated Alvin and the Chipmunks and another DVD volume of Alvin and the Chipmunks Go to the Movies. On March 25, 2014, the film was released on Blu-ray for the first time.

== Critical reception ==
=== Initial release ===
Upon the film's initial theatrical and home video releases, it received mixed reviews. Rick Bentley of The Town Talk was enthused about the film, praising the animation as "first-rate", the story as "interesting", and soundtrack as "near-perfect". He concluded that the film is "entertaining for [the] young and old" and an "early [summer] treat [for this year]." Janet Maslin of The New York Times commentated that the film is enjoyable for both parents and children. In his Family Guide to Movies on Video, Henry Herx deemed the film a "charming, lighthearted diversion for the younger set", and remarked that it resembled "a musical revue of pop tunes". Hal Hinson of The Washington Post called the film "a must-see, a romp, a delight and oh so chock-full-o'-fun." Johanna Steinmetz of Chicago Tribune gave the film three stars out of four, stating that the inclusion of the minor characters (especially the villains) would "[keep] an adult viewer from insulin crisis." Jack Garner of Gannett News Service also gave the film three stars out of four, describing the film as "colorful, tuneful, and features inventive gags and robust villains." In the Fort Worth Star-Telegram issue from November 13, 1987, a review on Major Releases rated the film a scale of 6 out of 10, commenting that the film blends "humor, adventure, and pop-oriented music to solid effect" and "benefits immeasurably from the vocal talents of Susan Tyrrell as [Claudia]."

Richard Freeman of Newhouse News compared the film to An American Tail as "less gloomily pretentious" and the Care Bears and Rainbow Brite cartoons as "less sickly-sweet". He described the animation as "not on a par with Disney[...] but better than Saturday morning TV" and praised the score and soundtrack of the film. Lou Cedrone of the Baltimore Evening Sun praised the soundtrack, score, and voices, but stated that the animation "looks like [a] Saturday morning variety." George Williams of The Orange County Register called the film "a hopelessly corny movie". He was questionable about the Chipettes' voices and their human form, but praised the soundtrack and its Dolby Stereo sound quality. Film critic Paul McKie praised the "superior" animation and the "delightful pair of villains", but criticized the Chipettes for not having personalities. A review on Madison Capital Times' Books & Video recalled the film as "one of the rare cartoon features that is hip enough for adults", but warned that some songs can be "too cutesy" for an older audience. Scott Cain of Cox News Service commented that the "[fans] will have difficulty [with the Chipmunks' shrill voices]", though he called the film an "unfailingly cheerful enterprise". Glenda Cohn Wolin of Knight-Ridder News Service described the film as "mildly entertain[ing]". She praised the backgrounds of cities and landmarks as "attractively realistic" and stated that they offer a "bit of education", but criticized the stereotypes as a "bit uncomfortable".

Film critic Chris Chase gave the film 2 1/2 out of 4 stars, stating that "kiddies [and Saturday-morning audiences] should love [the film]." Film critic Rochelle Flynn gave the film two stars, describing the film as a "cute enough cartoon, but nothing to go out of [the] way for [the film]." Charles Solomon of The Los Angeles Times commented "listening to six little characters talk and sing in speeded-up falsetto voices for 76 minutes becomes a real test of the viewer's endurance." Solomon also said that the villains resembled those from a Ralph Bakshi film and did not fit with the world of the Chipmunks. David Bianculli of The Philadelphia Inquirer also gave the film two stars, critiquing that "without [very much of Dave Seville, the film isn't as] funny." Greg Burliuk of The Kingston Whig-Standard reviewed that the film is "[more] on action than laughs". He questioned about the Chipettes and their human form, criticized the animation for losing most of the "romantic glamor" of the pyramids and cities, described the songs as "very mediocre", and praised the "Wooly Bully" sequence as "one magic moment". Roger Ebert commented that the animation is slightly better than the TV series, but criticized the film's "dumb and predictable" story, while Gene Siskel criticized the plot for being right out of a Saturday morning cartoon, especially through the film's introduction of the Chipettes. Both Ebert and Siskel also criticized the plot and the Chipmunks' voices, with Ebert comparing them to "fingernails on the blackboard". Siskel and Ebert ultimately gave the film two thumbs down.

=== Retrospective ===
The film reception was more positive throughout the years. On review aggregation website Rotten Tomatoes, the film has an approval rating of 75% based on 8 reviews, with an average rating of 6.6/10. Randy Myers of Knight Ridder rated the film 3 1/2 out of 4 stars, calling the film an "absolutely delightful continuation of the [franchise]". He praised the "spunky, tuneful, and funny" musical numbers, especially the Chipmunks' cover of "Wooly Bully". Eric Henderson of Slant Magazine gave the film three stars out of four. Nancy Davis Kho of Common Sense Media gave the film three stars out of five, calling the film a "mildly entertaining adventure set against a backdrop of international wonders", but warned that there are negative stereotypes of Arab thugs and some African cannibals. She recommended the film for ages 5 and older.
