= Ross Bagdasarian Jr. =

American animator

- Born: Ross Dickran Bagdasarian; 1949 (age 76–77)
- Other name: Ross Bagdasarian
- Occupations: Animator; filmmaker; voice actor
- Years active: 1973–present
- Employers: Bagdasarian Productions; Chipmunk Records; PettuniaMedia; Bagdasarian Home Entertainment
- Television: See full List below
- Title: President of Bagdasarian Productions and Chipmunk Records; Founder of PettuniaMedia
- Spouse: Janice Karman (m. 1980)
- Children: 2
- Father: Ross Bagdasarian
- Relatives: William Saroyan (first cousin once removed); Aram Saroyan (second cousin); Lucy Saroyan (second cousin); Strawberry Saroyan (second cousin once removed)

Ross Dickran Bagdasarian (born 1949) is an American animator, filmmaker, and voice actor, known for his work on the Alvin and the Chipmunks franchise. He is the son of the franchise's creator, Ross Bagdasarian.

== Early life ==
Bagdasarian is the son of Armenian-American parents Armenuhi Bagdasarian (née Kulhanjian) and Ross Bagdasarian (1919–1972). As a child, he worked with his father on The Alvin Show by helping edit and coordinate the soundtracks and falsetto voice-overs of the Chipmunks.

== Career ==
Bagdasarian graduated from law school. He succeeded his father as president of Bagdasarian Productions in 1972 after the death of the elder Bagdasarian. The company had fallen into obscurity after significant success between 1958 and the late 1960s. Bagdasarian was also admitted to the California bar as an attorney in 1975.

Under Bagdasarian's supervision, new Chipmunks records were created shortly after his marriage to Janice Karman, including Chipmunk Punk. In 1981, the Chipmunks returned to television in the cartoon special A Chipmunk Christmas. Two years later, Ruby-Spears Productions' Alvin and the Chipmunks Saturday morning cartoon series debuted on NBC. Based on that series, a feature film, The Chipmunk Adventure was released in 1987. Bagdasarian voices Alvin, Simon, and Dave Seville, and Karman voices Theodore and the Chipettes (Brittany, Jeanette, and Eleanor).

Bagdasarian and Karman hold tight creative and financial control over the Chipmunk franchise, reviewing each and every business contract in great detail. In the mid-90s, Bagdasarian bought out his brother's and sister's portions of the Chipmunk rights, to take complete control of the franchise.

=== Universal Pictures lawsuit ===
Bagdasarian licensed the rights to the Chipmunk characters to Universal Pictures in 1996, resulting in a string of Universal-produced direct-to-video films. Four years later, he and Karman sued them for breach of contract, claiming that Universal failed to properly utilize, market, and merchandise the characters and hence resulting in a loss of royalties to Bagdasarian. The case was decided in Bagdasarian's favor. "For us, it was a custody battle", Karman said. "They finally realized 'OK, these two are really fighting for their kids'."

== Personal life ==
Bagdasarian married Janice Karman in 1980. She is the co-president of Bagdasarian Productions.

== Filmography ==
=== Film ===
Year	Title	Producer	Writer	Actor	Role	Notes
1987	The Chipmunk Adventure	Yes	Yes	Yes	Alvin Seville; Simon Seville; David Seville	
1999	Alvin and the Chipmunks Meet Frankenstein	Yes	No	Yes	Alvin Seville; Simon Seville; David Seville	Direct-to-video
2000	Alvin and the Chipmunks Meet the Wolfman	Yes	No	Yes	Alvin Seville; Simon Seville; David Seville	Direct-to-video
2004	Little Alvin and the Mini-Munks	Yes	No	Yes	Alvin Seville; Simon Seville; David Seville	Direct-to-video
2007	Alvin and the Chipmunks	Yes	No	Yes	Alvin Seville (singing voice)	Songwriter
2009	Alvin and the Chipmunks: The Squeakquel	Yes	No	Yes	Alvin Seville (singing voice)	Singing Voice
2011	Alvin and the Chipmunks: Chipwrecked	Yes	No	Yes	Alvin Seville (singing voice)	Singing Voice
2015	Alvin and the Chipmunks: The Road Chip	Yes	No	Yes	Alvin Seville (singing voice)	Singing Voice

=== Television ===
Year	Title	Producer	Writer	Actor	Role	Notes
1981	A Chipmunk Christmas	Yes	Yes	Yes	Alvin Seville; Simon Seville; Dave Seville	TV film
1983–1990	Alvin and the Chipmunks	Yes	Yes	Yes	Alvin Seville; Simon Seville; Dave Seville	TV series
1984	I Love the Chipmunks Valentine Special	Yes	Yes	Yes	Alvin Seville; Simon Seville; Dave Seville	TV film
1985	A Chipmunk Reunion	Yes	Yes	Yes	Alvin Seville; Simon Seville; Dave Seville	TV film
1990	Cartoon All-Stars to the Rescue	No	No	Yes	Alvin Seville; Simon Seville	TV short
1990	Rockin' Through the Decades	Yes	Yes	Yes	Alvin Seville; Simon Seville; Dave Seville	TV film
1994	Alvin and the Chipmunks: Trick or Treason	Yes	Yes	Yes	Alvin Seville; Simon Seville; Dave Seville	TV film
1994	A Chipmunk Celebration	Yes	Yes	Yes	Alvin Seville; Simon Seville; Dave Seville	TV film
1995	The Easter Chipmunk	Yes	Yes	Yes	Alvin Seville; Simon Seville; Dave Seville	TV film
2015–2023	Alvinnn!!! and the Chipmunks	Yes	No	Yes	Alvin Seville; Simon Seville; Dave Seville	TV series

Business positions
Preceded by Ross Bagdasarian	President of Bagdasarian Productions; 1978–present	Succeeded by Incumbent
Preceded by Ross Bagdasarian	Owner of Alvin and the Chipmunks; 1978–present	Succeeded by Incumbent

Preceded by Ross Bagdasarian	Voice of Dave Seville; 1978–present	Succeeded by Incumbent
Preceded by Ross Bagdasarian	Voice of Alvin & The Chipmunks; 1978–present	Succeeded by Incumbent
Preceded by Ross Bagdasarian	Voice of Alvin Seville; 1978–present	Succeeded by Incumbent
Preceded by Ross Bagdasarian	Voice of Simon Seville; 1978–present	Succeeded by Incumbent
Preceded by Ross Bagdasarian	Voice of Theodore Seville; 1978–present	Succeeded by Incumbent
