= Janice Karman =

American actress and producer

- Born: Los Angeles, California, U.S.
- Other name: Janice Bagdasarian
- Occupations: Filmmaker; designer; voice actress; singer
- Years active: 1973–present
- Known for: The wife of Ross Bagdasarian Jr., daughter of Harvey Karman
- Notable work: The Chipettes
- Spouse: Ross Bagdasarian Jr. (m. 1980)
- Children: 2
- Father: Harvey Karman
- Relatives: Ross Bagdasarian (father-in-law)

Janice Karman Bagdasarian (born May 21, 1954) is an American filmmaker, designer, voice actress, and singer. She is the co-owner of Bagdasarian Productions with her husband Ross Bagdasarian Jr., the production company known for Alvin and the Chipmunks music, movies, television, and other media.

== Early life ==
Karman was born in Los Angeles, California. Her father was psychologist Harvey Leroy Karman (born Harvey Walters). Her mother, Felice Karman, was also a psychologist. Karman played the role of Bunny in the 1975 film Switchblade Sisters (alternate title: The Jezebels), and Hank in the 1976 exploitation film Slumber Party '57.

== Bagdasarian Productions ==
The focus of Bagdasarian Productions company is on creating albums, cartoons, and other products based on the Alvin and the Chipmunks characters, who were created by Bagdasarian's father Ross Bagdasarian Sr., besides helping to produce the records and cartoons. Karman provides the singing voices of Theodore and the members of the female spin-off group The Chipettes: Brittany, Jeanette, and Eleanor (since 2015, she replaces Dody Goodman as the voice of Miss Beatrice Miller).

In 1983, Karman, as writer and producer, assisted with the creation of an Alvin and The Chipmunks version of the Christmas Carol, which is available on DVD.

In Little Alvin and the Mini-Munks, Janice also got to play the role of La-Lu. She originally voiced Theodore in the film series, but for promotional reasons Theodore was re-recorded by the singer and actor Jesse McCartney. However, her singing was kept in.

== Personal life ==
Karman and her husband Ross Bagdasarian Jr. were married in 1980. Together, they have two children: a daughter, Vanessa, and a son, Michael.

| Preceded by Created | Voice of The Chipettes; 1983–present | Succeeded by Incumbent |
| Preceded by Created | Voice of Brittany Miller; 1983–present | Succeeded by Incumbent |
| Preceded by Created | Voice of Jeanette Miller; 1983–present | Succeeded by Incumbent |
| Preceded by Created | Voice of Eleanor Miller; 1983–2015 | Succeeded by Vanessa Bagdasarian |
| Preceded by Ross Bagdasarian Sr. | Voice of Theodore Seville; 1978–present | Succeeded by Incumbent |
