= Ross Bagdasarian =

American singer-songwriter, record producer, and actor (1919–1972)

Ross S. Bagdasarian
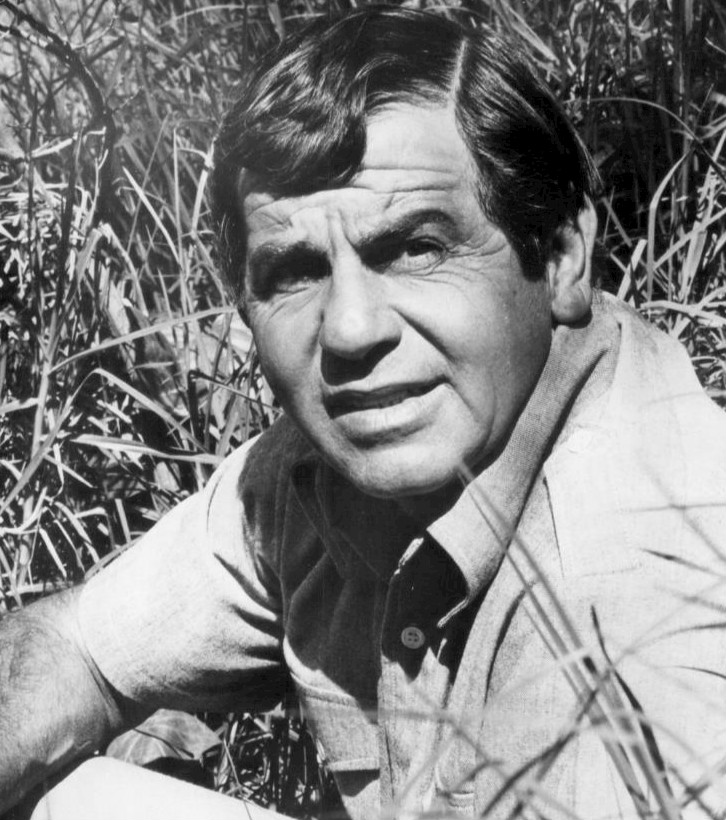
- Bagdasarian in 1972
- Born: January 27, 1919; Fresno, California, U.S.
- Died: January 16, 1972 (aged 52); Beverly Hills, California, U.S.
- Resting place: Chapel of the Pines Crematory
- Other name: David Seville (stage name)
- Occupations: Singer; songwriter; record producer; actor
- Years active: 1939–1972
- Notable work: Alvin and the Chipmunks
- Style: Novelty music
- Television: The Alvin Show (1961–62)
- Spouse: Armenouhi "Armen" Kulhanjian (m. 1946)
- Children: 3, including Ross Jr.
- Relatives: William Saroyan (cousin); Janice Karman (daughter-in-law)
- Website: alvinandthechipmunks.com

Ross S. Bagdasarian (Note: Sometimes known as Bagdasarian Sr. to distinguish from his son, Ross Bagdasarian Jr.. He is listed as Ross S. Bagdasarian in the California Birth Index, World War II Army Enlistment Records, and in California Deaths and Burials. William Saroyan, his cousin, gave his full name as Sipon Rostom Bagdasarian. Mark Arnold gives it as Rostom Sipan Bagdasarian.) (/bæɡdəˈsɛəriən/; January 27, 1919 – January 16, 1972), also known by his stage name David Seville, was an American singer, songwriter, record producer, and actor best known for creating the cartoon band Alvin and the Chipmunks. Initially a stage and film actor, he rose to prominence in 1958 with the songs "Witch Doctor" and "The Chipmunk Song (Christmas Don't Be Late)", which both became Billboard number-one singles. He produced and directed The Alvin Show, which aired on CBS in 1961–62.

== Early life ==
Bagdasarian was born on January 27, 1919, in Fresno, California, to an Armenian-American family. His father was a grape grower. He had two elder brothers: Richard Sirak (1910–1966) and Harry Sisvan (1915–1989). The novelist William Saroyan, with whom he was very close, was his first cousin.

Bagdasarian graduated from Fresno High School in 1937. He went to New York to work with his cousin Saroyan, intending to become an actor. When World War II started, he enlisted and served four years as a control tower operator and rose to the rank of a staff sergeant (SSgt) in the Army Air Forces. He spent time in England, France and Spain; his later stage name "David Seville" originated from the fact that he was stationed in the city of Seville in Spain and he liked the city.

After the war, he returned to Fresno, married Armenouhi "Armen" Kulhanjian, and they tried for a time to be grape growers. They were unsuccessful, and they moved to Los Angeles, where he started a career as a songwriter.

== Career ==
=== Acting ===
Bagdasarian's Broadway debut was in 1939 when he played the newsboy in The Time of Your Life by William Saroyan, his cousin. He also appeared in minor roles in several films, such as Viva Zapata! (1952), Stalag 17 (1953), and Destination Gobi (1953). In Alfred Hitchcock's Rear Window (1954), he is the lonely composer at the piano. Acting in The Proud and Profane (1956), he also composed and performed the tie-in song The Ballad of Colin Black.

=== Singing and songwriting ===
Bagdasarian's first major songwriting success came with "Come On-a My House", which he co-wrote with William Saroyan in 1939. Many record companies rejected the song for being "too ethnic", and it was not recorded until 1950 (by Kay Armen). The songwriters themselves recorded it as a duet in 1951. Mitch Miller of Columbia Records came across the song and persuaded Rosemary Clooney to record it. It became a million-selling hit. It is an adaptation of an Armenian folk song Bagdasarian wrote with his cousin William Saroyan. The song was originally composed for their off-Broadway musical The Son. It launched Clooney's career, reaching number one on Billboard charts and was number four on Billboard year-end top 30 singles of 1951. The song sold some 750,000 records in a month. In 1954, Bagdasarian wrote "Hey, Brother, Pour the Wine", a hit for Dean Martin.

In 1955, Bagdasarian signed with the then-newly established Liberty Records. In early 1956 he had a transcontinental hit with the novelty record "The Trouble with Harry" (inspired by the homonymous Hitchcock film) credited to Alfi & Harry, although Alfi & Harry was just one person, Bagdasarian himself. It reached No. 44 on the Billboard chart and was a bigger hit in the United Kingdom reaching No. 15.

In 1956, he wrote an instrumental "Armen's Theme" named after his wife. The executives at Liberty Records suggested that he adopt a pseudonym as they thought his name was too difficult to pronounce. In December 1956, he charted with his first record credited to his David Seville pseudonym, and "Armen's Theme" reached No. 42 on the Billboard chart.

==== Dave Seville and the Chipmunks ====
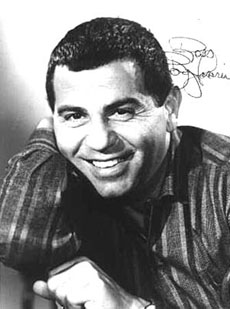
Bagdasarian pictured in the 1950s

Bagdasarian's rise to prominence came with the song "Witch Doctor" in 1958, which was created after he experimented with the speed control on a tape recorder bought with $200 (equivalent to $2,200 in 2025) from the family savings. Liberty Records released this novelty record under the David Seville name. It is a duet between his real voice and an accelerated version. The record went on to become a Billboard number-one single by April 28, 1958, and further established him as a songwriter. It sold 1.5 million copies.

Bagdasarian went on to create his trio of Chipmunks named after the executives of Liberty Records: Simon, Theodore, and Alvin, named for Simon "Si" Waronker, Theodore "Ted" Keep, and Alvin Bennett. Their debut song, "The Chipmunk Song (Christmas Don't Be Late)" was released on November 17, 1958, and became a number one hit by New Years Day. The song sold 4 million records in the first few months. It topped Billboard charts the two weeks before and two weeks after New Years and won three Grammy Awards at the 1st Annual Grammy Awards on May 4, 1959: Best Recording for Children, Best Comedy Performance, and Best Non-Classical Engineered Song. Bagdasarian won the first two as David Seville. The song was the 23rd most-performed Christmas song of the 20th century.

Shana Alexander, writing for Life magazine in 1959, noted that Bagdasarian was the first case in the "annals of popular music that one man has served as writer, composer, publisher, conductor and multiple vocalist of a hit record, thereby directing all possible revenues from the song back into his pocket." Alexander also found it remarkable that Bagdasarian "can neither read nor write music nor play any musical instrument in the accepted sense of the word." Bagdasarian owned Chipmunk Enterprises, which sponsored Chipmunk-related sales. By 1963, some 15 companies were using or planned to use Alvin figures. By that year, Billboard magazine estimated the total income from the Chipmunks' record sales (including overseas sales) and record club sales to be around $20 million ($157 million adjusted for inflation in 2024 dollars).

In the following years, the Chipmunks released several hit songs: "Alvin's Harmonica" (1959), "Ragtime Cowboy Joe" (1959), "Alvin's Orchestra" (1960), "Rudolph the Red Nosed Reindeer" (1960), "The Alvin Twist" (1962), and the album The Chipmunks Sing the Beatles Hits in 1964 during the British Invasion.

Bagdasarian produced The Alvin Show, a half-hour TV cartoon show broadcast on CBS from October 1961 to September 1962.

In 1968, Alvin and the Chipmunks recorded a version of "The Chipmunk Song" with the rock band Canned Heat, who also recorded for Liberty Records.

== Personal life ==
Bagdasarian married Armenouhi "Armen" Kulhanjian (1927–1991) in 1946. (Note: She was widely referred to, including by Bagdasarian, as "Armen".) They had three children: Carol Askine (b. 1947), an actress; Ross Jr. (b. 1949); and Adam Serak (b. 1954), a fiction writer. They lived in Los Angeles from 1950. As of 1963, he owned a grape ranch in California called the Chipmunk Ranch. In the mid-1960s, he bought Sierra Wine Corp., a winery that supplied product, among others, to E & J Gallo Winery.

== Death and legacy ==
Bagdasarian died in his Beverly Hills, California, home of a heart attack on January 16, 1972, eleven days before his 53rd birthday. He was cremated, his ashes previously inurned at the Chapel of the Pines Crematory in Los Angeles.

Bagdasarian willed the Chipmunks franchise to his wife and three children. Ross Jr. said in an interview that he "worshipped" his father and felt a need to continue his work. He resumed the franchise with his wife Janice Karman in the late 1970s, after finishing law school, and became the complete owner when he bought the rights from his siblings in the mid-1990s.

== Discography ==
=== Albums ===
- The Music of David Seville (1957 Liberty 3073)
- The Witch Doctor Presents: David Seville...and his Friends (1958 Liberty 3092)
- Let's All Sing with the Chipmunks (1959 Liberty 3132)
- Sing Again with the Chipmunks (1960 Liberty)
- Around the World with the Chipmunks (1960 Liberty Records)
- The Alvin Show (1961 Liberty Records/Capitol)
- The Chipmunk Songbook (1962 Capitol/Liberty)
- Christmas with the Chipmunks (1962 Liberty)
- Christmas with the Chipmunks Vol. 2 (1963 Liberty Records)
- The Chipmunks Sing the Beatles Hits (1964 Sunset/Liberty; as Alvin and the Chipmunks with David Seville)
- Chipmunks à Go-Go (1965 Liberty 3424; as Alvin, Simon and Theodore with David Seville)
- The Mixed-Up World of Bagdasarian (1966 Liberty 7451; recorded under David Seville's real name, Ross Bagdasarian)

== Filmography ==
- The Greatest Show on Earth (1952) as Spectator (uncredited)
- Viva Zapata! (1952) as Officer (uncredited)
- The Stars Are Singing (1953) as Song Promoter (uncredited)
- Destination Gobi (1953) as Paul Sabatello
- The Girls of Pleasure Island (1953) as Marine (uncredited)
- Stalag 17 (1953) as Singing Prisoner of War (uncredited)
- Alaska Seas (1954) as Joe, Jim's crewman
- Rear Window (1954) as Songwriter/pianist
- Kismet (1955) as Fevvol (uncredited)
- Hot Blood (1956) as Gas Station Attendant (uncredited)
- The Proud and Profane (1956) as Louie
- Three Violent People (1956) as Asuncion Ortega
- The Devil's Hairpin (1957) as Tani Ritter
- The Deep Six (1958) as Pvt. Aaron Slobodjian
- The Alvin Show (1961–1962, TV Series) as Alvin, Simon, Theodore and David Seville (voice, final appearance)

== See also ==
- Armenian Americans in Los Angeles

== Bibliography ==
- Arnold, Mark (2019). Aaaaalllviiinnn!: The Story of Ross Bagdasarian Sr., Liberty Records, Format Films and The Alvin Show. BearManor Media. ISBN 978-1-62933-432-5.

Business positions
Preceded by Created	President of Bagdasarian Productions; 1961–1972	Succeeded by Ross Bagdasarian Jr.
Preceded by Created	Owner of Alvin and the Chipmunks; 1958–1972	Succeeded by Ross Bagdasarian Jr.

Preceded by Created	Voice of Dave Seville; 1958–1972	Succeeded by Ross Bagdasarian Jr.
Preceded by Created	Voice of Alvin & The Chipmunks; 1958–1972	Succeeded by Ross Bagdasarian Jr.
Preceded by Created	Voice of Alvin Seville; 1958–1972	Succeeded by Ross Bagdasarian Jr.
Preceded by Created	Voice of Simon Seville; 1958–1972	Succeeded by Ross Bagdasarian Jr.
Preceded by Created	Voice of Theodore Seville; 1958–1972	Succeeded by Janice Karman
