= Alvin and the Chipmunks discography =

- Studio albums: 38
- Soundtrack albums: 8
- Compilation albums: 9
- Tribute albums: 2
- Singles: 41

This is the complete discography of the fictional music group Alvin and the Chipmunks.

== Albums ==
- 1959: Let's All Sing with The Chipmunks
- 1960: Sing Again with The Chipmunks
- 1960: Around the World with The Chipmunks
- 1961: The Alvin Show
- 1962: The Chipmunk Songbook
- 1962: Christmas with The Chipmunks
- 1963: Christmas with The Chipmunks Vol. 2
- 1964: The Chipmunks Sing the Beatles Hits
- 1965: The Chipmunks Sing with Children
- 1965: Chipmunks à Go-Go
- 1968: The Chipmunks See Doctor Dolittle
- 1969: The Chipmunks Go to the Movies
- 1975: The Very Best of The Chipmunks
- 1980: Chipmunk Punk
- 1981: Urban Chipmunk
- 1981: A Chipmunk Christmas
- 1982: Chipmunk Rock
- 1982: The Chipmunks Go Hollywood
- 1982: Chipmunk Mania
- 1982: The Chipmunks' 20 All Time Golden Greats
- 1984: Songs from Our TV Shows
- 1985: The Chipmunks 'Munk Rock
- 1987: The Chipmunk Adventure
- 1988: Solid Gold Chipmunks: 30 Years of Great Hits
- 1988: The Chipmunks and The Chipettes: Born to Rock
- 1991: Rockin' Through the Decades
- 1991: The Chipmunks Rock the House
- 1992: Chipmunks in Low Places
- 1992: Greatest Hits
- 1992: A Chipmunk Christmas (CD version)
- 1993: Urban Chipmunk (CD version)
- 1993: The Chipmunks' 35th Birthday Party
- 1993: The Chipmunks Sing-Alongs (two albums: Ragtime Cowboy Joe and Working on the Railroad)
- 1994: Here's Looking at Me! 35 Years of Chipmunk Classics
- 1994: A Very Merry Chipmunk
- 1995: When You Wish Upon a Chipmunk
- 1996: Club Chipmunk: The Dance Mixes
- 1998: The A-Files: Alien Songs
- 1999: Greatest Hits: Still Squeaky After All These Years (original)
- 1999: The Chipmunks' Greatest Christmas Hits
- 2003: Merry Christmas from the Chipmunks
- 2003: The Chipmunks Show: Best of the Chipmunks (released in Japan only)
- 2004: Little Alvin and the Mini-Munks
- 2007: Greatest Hits: Still Squeaky After All These Years (re-release)
- 2007: Alvin and the Chipmunks: Original Motion Picture Soundtrack
- 2007: Christmas with the Chipmunks (2007 album) (contains all 24 songs from Christmas with the Chipmunks and Christmas with the Chipmunks Vol. 2, plus the 1968 version of "The Chipmunk Song" with Canned Heat as a bonus song at the end of the album)
- 2008: Christmas with the Chipmunks (2008 album)
- 2008: Undeniable
- 2009: Alvin and the Chipmunks: The Squeakquel: Original Motion Picture Soundtrack
- 2011: Alvin and the Chipmunks: Chipwrecked: Music from the Motion Picture
- 2012: Chipmunks Christmas
- 2013: All the Hits and Then Some
- 2015: We're the Chipmunks (Music from the TV Show)
- 2015: Alvin and the Chipmunks: The Road Chip: Original Motion Picture Soundtrack
- 2017: Nuts 2 U
- 2019: YOLO

== Vinyl re-release albums ==
- 1974: Christmas with the Chipmunks (United Artists UA-LA352-E2) (2-LP repackage of Christmas With The Chipmunks and Christmas with the Chipmunks Vol. 2)
- 1975: Christmas with the Chipmunks (Mistletoe MLP-1216)
- 1975: Christmas with the Chipmunks Vol. 2 (Mistletoe MLP-1217)
- 1980: Christmas with the Chipmunks (Pickwick SPC-1034) (reuses the cover artwork from the United Artists re-release, with the original front cover of Christmas with the Chipmunks Vol. 2 on the front and Christmas with the Chipmunks on the back)
- 1980: The Twelve Days of Christmas with the Chipmunks (re-release of Christmas with the Chipmunks Vol. 2, mono but labeled stereo, with new cover artwork by Doug Oudekirk, the artist who had drawn the Chipmunk Punk cover)
- 1980: Christmas with the Chipmunks (Liberty LM-1071) (without "Over the River and Through the Woods" and "We Wish You a Merry Christmas") (stereo)
- 1981: The Chipmunks Sing The Beatles Hits (EMI Nut NUTM-31) (mono UK re-release sold in the US as an import)
- 1982: The Chipmunks Sing The Beatles Hits (Liberty LN-10177) (without "Twist and Shout" and "I Saw Her Standing There") (stereo)
- 1982: Chipmunks à Go-Go (Liberty LN-10178) (without "Sunshine, Lollipops and Rainbows" and "The Race Is On") (stereo)
- 1986: Christmas with the Chipmunks Vol. 2 (Liberty) (stereo)

== Singles and other charted songs ==
- 1958: "Witch Doctor (1958 version)/Don't Whistle at Me Baby" (Liberty F-55132) (US #1; CAN #1) (Credited solely to David Seville)
- 1958: "The Bird on My Head/Hey There Moon" (Liberty F-55140) (US #36) (Credited solely to David Seville)
- 1958: "The Chipmunk Song (1958 version)/Almost Good" (Liberty F-55168) (US #1; Can #1) (A-side is credited as "The Chipmunks, Alvin, Theodore & Simon, with the music of David Seville"; B-side is a non-Chipmunk David Seville track)

[NOTE: "The Chipmunk Song" re-charted in 1959, 1960, 1961 and 1962, reaching the Billboard Top 40 in 1961 and 1962. However, the single's B-side was changed to "Alvin's Harmonica."]

- 1959: "Alvin's Harmonica/Mediocre" (Liberty F-55179) (US #3; CAN #1) (A-side artist credited as "David Seville & The Chipmunks;" B-side is a non-Chipmunk David Seville track)
- 1959: "Ragtime Cowboy Joe/Flip Side" (Liberty F-55200) (US #16; CAN #4) (B-side is a non-Chipmunk David Seville track)
- 1960: "Alvin's Orchestra/Copyright 1960" (Liberty F-55233) (US #33) (B-side is a non-Chipmunk David Seville track)
- 1960: "Comin' Round The Mountain/Sing a Goofy Song" (Liberty F-55246)
- 1960: "Witch Doctor (1960 version)/Swanee River" (Liberty F-55275)
- 1960: "Alvin for President/Sack Time" (Liberty F-55277) (US #95) (B-side is a non-Chipmunk David Seville track)
- 1960: "Rudolph the Red-Nosed Reindeer/Spain" (Liberty F-55289) (US #21)
- 1962: "The Alvin Twist/I Wish I Could Speak French" (Liberty 55424) (beginning with this release, the artist was credited as "The Chipmunks - Alvin, Simon and Theodore with David Seville")
- 1962: "America the Beautiful/My Wild Irish Rose" (Liberty 55452)
- 1963: "Alvin's All Star Chipmunk Band/Old MacDonald Cha Cha Cha" (Liberty 55544)
- 1963: "Eefin' Alvin/Flip Side" (Liberty 55632) (B-side is a non-Chipmunk David Seville track and is the second time that this song was released on a Chipmunks single; see above)
- 1963: "Wonderful Day/The Night Before Christmas" (Liberty 55635)
- 1964: "All My Loving" (Beatles cover)/"Do You Want to Know a Secret" (Beatles cover) (Liberty 55734)
- 1965: "Do-Re-Mi" (with the Jimmy Joyce Children's Chorus)/"Supercalifragilisticexpialidocious" (with the Jimmy Joyce Children's Chorus) (Liberty 55773)
- 1965: "I'm Henry VIII, I Am" (Fred Murray and R. P. Weston cover and Herman's Hermits cover/"What's New, Pussycat?" (Tom Jones cover) (Liberty 55832)
- 1967: "Sorry About That, Herb/Apple Picker" (Dot 16997) (a parody of Herb Alpert & the Tijuana Brass)
- 1968: "The Christmas Blues" (Canned Heat song)/"The Chipmunk Song" (1968 version (with Canned Heat)) (Liberty 56079)
- 1968: "Talk to the Animals" (from Doctor Dolittle)/"My Friend the Doctor" (from Doctor Dolittle) (Sunset 61002)
- 1968: "Chitty Chitty Bang Bang" (from Chitty Chitty Bang Bang)/"Hushabye Mountain" (from Chitty Chitty Bang Bang) (Sunset 61003)
- 1980: "You May Be Right" (Billy Joel cover) (US #101) /"Crazy Little Thing Called Love" (Queen cover)
- 1980: "Call Me" (Blondie cover)/"Refugee" (Tom Petty and the Heartbreakers cover)
- 1981: "I Love a Rainy Night" (Eddie Rabbitt cover)/"Coward of the County" (Kenny Rogers cover)
- 1981: "Lunchbox" (with Jerry Reed)/"Mammas Don't Let Your Babies Grow Up to Be Chipmunks" ((with Larry Butler) (Waylon Jennings and Willie Nelson cover))
- 1981: "Sleigh Ride/The Chipmunk Song" (1981 version)
- 1982: "Bette Davis Eyes" (Kim Carnes cover)/"Heartbreaker" (Pat Benatar cover)
- 1982: "E.T. and Me"/"Tomorrow" (from Annie)
- 1983: "We're The Chipmunks"/"Beat It" (Michael Jackson cover)
- 1990: "Jingle Bells Finale"
- 1993: "Achy Breaky Heart" (Billy Ray Cyrus cover (with guest star Billy Ray Cyrus and Brittany of the Chipettes))/"I Ain't No Dang Cartoon" (Epic 74776) (#72 Billboard Hot Country Singles & Tracks)
- 1994: "Gotta Believe In Pumpkins"
- 1994: "I Don't Want To Be Alone For Christmas (Unless I'm Alone With You)" (actually performed by guest star James Ingram)
- 1996: "Macarena" (Los del Rio cover (with the Chipettes))/"Love Shack" (B-52's cover (with the Chipettes))"
- 2007: "The Chipmunk Song" (2007 version) (US #66)
- 2007: "Witch Doctor" (2007 version) (US #62)
- 2008: "Bad Day" (Daniel Powter cover) (US #67)
- 2008: "Funkytown" (Lipps Inc. cover) (US #86)
- 2008: "Shake Your Groove Thing" (Peaches & Herb cover)
- 2012: "Witch Doctor 2.0" (with the Chipettes; iTunes only credits the Chipmunks)

== Charting albums ==
Year	Album	Chart positions				Certifications	
Year	Album	US	US Country	CAN	CAN Country	RIAA	CRIA
1960	Let's All Sing with the Chipmunks	4					
1960	Sing Again with the Chipmunks	31					
1962	Christmas with the Chipmunks	84				Platinum	
1963	Christmas with the Chipmunks Vol. 2	9					
1964	The Chipmunks Sing the Beatles Hits	14					
1980	Chipmunk Punk	34		59		Gold	Gold
1981	Urban Chipmunk	56	23			Gold	Gold
1982	Chipmunk Rock	109		44			
1982	A Chipmunk Christmas	72				Gold	Gold
1992	Chipmunks in Low Places	21	6		9	Platinum	Platinum
1994	A Very Merry Chipmunk	147					
2007	Alvin and the Chipmunks: Original Motion Picture Soundtrack	5				Platinum	
2008	Undeniable	78					
2009	Alvin and the Chipmunks: The Squeakquel: Original Motion Picture Soundtrack	6				Gold	
2011	Alvin and the Chipmunks: Chipwrecked: Music from the Motion Picture	36					

Chipmunks in Low Places was placed at #49 in the Canadian Top 50 Country albums of 1993.
