= Alvin and the Chipmunks (disambiguation) =

Alvin and the Chipmunks are a virtual band created by Ross Bagdasarian, Sr., for a novelty record in 1958.

Alvin and the Chipmunks may also refer to:

- The Alvin Show, featuring Alvin and the Chipmunks and Clyde Crashcup, a TV series aired from 1961 to 1962
- Alvin and the Chipmunks (1983 TV series), a TV series aired from 1983 to 1990
- Alvin and the Chipmunks in film, a series of feature-length films
  - Alvin and the Chipmunks Meet Frankenstein (1999)
  - Alvin and the Chipmunks Meet the Wolfman (2000)
  - Alvin and the Chipmunks (film) (2007)
    - Alvin and the Chipmunks (video game), a video game based on the film
  - Alvin and the Chipmunks: The Squeakquel (2009)
  - Alvin and the Chipmunks: Chipwrecked (2011)
  - Alvin and the Chipmunks: The Road Chip (2015)
- Alvinnn!!! and the Chipmunks, a CGI animated TV series aired from 2015 to 2023
