= Christmas with The Chipmunks =

Music albums

Christmas with The Chipmunks is the name given to four different Christmas music albums by Alvin and the Chipmunks. These albums were released individually in 1962, 1963, 2007 and 2008.

== Volume 1 ==
Christmas with The Chipmunks

Studio album by Alvin and the Chipmunks
- Released: 1962
- Genre: Christmas
- Length: 30:10
- Language: English
- Label: Liberty

Alvin and the Chipmunks chronology
| The Chipmunk Songbook (1962) | Christmas with The Chipmunks (1962) | Christmas with The Chipmunks Vol. 2 (1963) |

Singles from Christmas with The Chipmunks
- 1. "Rudolph the Red-Nosed Reindeer" Released: 1960

Professional ratings
Review scores
| Source | Rating |
|---|---|
| Allmusic | 4/5 stars |

Christmas with The Chipmunks was released in 1962 and contains 12 tracks. The album peaked at #33 on Billboard's Best Best For Christmas album chart on December 25, 1965 and #81 on the all-around charts. The tracks from this and its follow-up album, Christmas with The Chipmunks Vol. 2 have been in continuous circulation since their original releases; however, at some point since the late 1980s, Volume 2's cover has been given to Volume 1 and vice versa, with the volume number and track listing staying the same. Both albums have been combined and reissued several times since their original release, making the songs the most well known in the Chipmunk canon. The most current version available is a 2012 re-release Chipmunks Christmas.

=== Track listing ===
Side one

1. "Here Comes Santa Claus (Right Down Santa Claus Lane)" (Gene Autry, Oakley Haldeman) – 1:46
2. "Up on the Housetop" (Benjamin Hanby) – 1:34
3. "Silver Bells" (Jay Livingston, Ray Evans) – 2:18
4. "Rudolph the Red-Nosed Reindeer" (Johnny Marks) – 2:31
5. "Jingle Bells" (James Lord Pierpont) – 2:38
6. "Over the River and Through the Woods" (Lydia Maria Child) – 1:59

Side two

7. "Santa Claus Is Comin' to Town" (J. Fred Coots, Haven Gillespie) – 1:47
8. "It's Beginning to Look a Lot Like Christmas" (Meredith Willson) – 1:47
9. "Frosty the Snowman" (Walter "Jack" Rollins, Steve Nelson) – 2:01
10. "White Christmas" (Irving Berlin) – 2:38
11. "The Chipmunk Song (Christmas Don't Be Late)" (Ross Bagdasarian Sr.) – 2:21
12. "We Wish You a Merry Christmas" (Traditional) – 0:56

= originally issued on Around the World with The Chipmunks
= originally issued on Let's All Sing with The Chipmunks

== Volume 2 ==
Christmas with The Chipmunks Vol. 2

Studio album by Alvin and the Chipmunks
- Released: 1963
- Genre: Christmas
- Length: 33:10
- Language: English
- Label: Liberty Records (LP); EMI-Manhattan Records (CD)
- Producer: Ross Bagdasarian

Alvin and the Chipmunks chronology
| The Chipmunk Songbook (1962) | Christmas with The Chipmunks Vol. 2 (1963) | The Chipmunks Sing the Beatles Hits (1964) |

Singles from Christmas with the Chipmunks, Vll. 2
- 1. "Wonderful Day" Released: 1963

Professional ratings
Review scores
| Source | Rating |
|---|---|
| Allmusic | 4/5 stars |

Christmas with The Chipmunks Vol. 2 was released in 1963 and contains 12 tracks. Like Christmas with The Chipmunks, this volume contained 11 traditional holiday songs and one original composition by Ross Bagdasarian ("Wonderful Day").

=== Track listing ===
Side one

1. "Jingle Bell Rock" (Joe Beal, Jim Boothe) – 1:43
2. "Deck the Halls" (Traditional) – 2:19
3. "The Twelve Days Of Christmas" (Traditional) – 4:22
4. "Hang Up Your Stockin'" (Jack Mann) – 1:52
5. "Have Yourself a Merry Little Christmas" (Hugh Martin, Ralph Blane) – 2:34
6. "Jolly Old Saint Nicholas" (Wilf Carter) – 1:50

Side two

7. "Wonderful Day" (Ross Bagdasarian Sr.) – 2:29
8. "Christmas Time (Greensleeves)" (Traditional) – 3:07
9. "All I Want For Christmas (Is My Two Front Teeth)" (Donald Yetter Gardner) – 1:42
10. "O Christmas Tree (O Tannenbaum)" (Traditional) – 2:28
11. "The Night Before Christmas" (Clement Clarke Moore) – 3:01
12. "Here We Come A-Caroling" (Traditional) – 1:57

== 2007 reissue ==
Christmas with the Chipmunks (reissue) was released in 2007. The songs in this collection were all 24 songs from Christmas with the Chipmunks and Christmas with the Chipmunks Vol. 2 (although not in their original order of release from both volumes) and, as a bonus song at the end, the 1968 duet with Canned Heat "The Chipmunk Song".

== 2008 reissue ==
Christmas with The Chipmunks (2008 reissue)

Compilation album by The Chipmunks
- Released: September 16, 2008
- Genre: Christmas
- Length: 48:10
- Language: English
- Label: Capitol
- Producer: Ross Bagdasarian Sr.

The Chipmunks chronology
| Alvin and the Chipmunks: Original Motion Picture Soundtrack (2007) | Christmas with The Chipmunks (2008 reissue) (2008) | Undeniable (2008) |

Christmas with The Chipmunks (reissue) was released in 2008. The songs in this collection were culled from the two previous volumes released by Liberty Records. This version was remixed with heavy reverb added to the tracks.

=== Track listing ===
1. "Here Comes Santa Claus (Right Down Santa Claus Lane)" (Gene Autry, Oakley Haldeman) – 1:46
2. "The Chipmunk Song (Christmas Don't Be Late)" (Ross Bagdasarian) – 2:21
3. "Jingle Bells" (James Lord Pierpont) – 2:38
4. "It's Beginning to Look a Lot Like Christmas" (Meredith Willson) – 1:47
5. "Rudolph, the Red-Nosed Reindeer" (Johnny Marks) – 2:31
6. "Up on the Housetop" (Benjamin Hanby) – 1:34
7. "We Wish You a Merry Christmas" (Traditional) – 0:56
8. "Silver Bells" (Jay Livingston, Ray Evans) – 2:18
9. "Over the River and Through the Woods" (Lydia Maria Child) – 1:59
10. "All I Want For Christmas (Is My Two Front Teeth)" (Donald Yetter Gardner) – 1:42
11. "Frosty the Snowman" (Walter "Jack" Rollins, Steve Nelson) – 2:01
12. "The Twelve Days Of Christmas" (Traditional) – 4:22
13. "Santa Claus Is Comin' to Town" (J. Fred Coots, Haven Gillespie) – 1:47
14. "Christmas Time (Greensleeves)" (Traditional) – 3:07
15. "Here We Come A-Caroling" (Traditional) – 1:57
16. "Deck the Halls" (Traditional) – 2:19
17. "Have Yourself a Merry Little Christmas" (Hugh Martin, Ralph Blane) – 2:34
18. "Jingle Bell Rock" (Joe Beal, Jim Boothe) – 1:43
19. "O Christmas Tree (O Tannenbaum)" (Traditional) – 2:28
20. "White Christmas" (Irving Berlin) – 2:38
