= Chipmunk Rock =

Studio album by The Chipmunks
- Released: 1982
- Genre: Children's
- Length: 33:00
- Label: RCA
- Producer: Janice Karman; Ross Bagdasarian Jr.

The Chipmunks chronology
A Chipmunk Christmas (1981)	Chipmunk Rock (1982)	The Chipmunks Go Hollywood (1982)

Singles from Chipmunk Rock
- 1. "Bette Davis Eyes" Released: 1982

Music video
- "Jessie's Girl" on YouTube

Professional ratings
Review scores
Source	Rating
AllMusic	3.5/5 stars

Chipmunk Rock is a children's album by Alvin and the Chipmunks featuring covers of various rock hits, mostly from the late 1970s and early 1980s, plus one original tune.

The album name and cover is a parody of Deep Purple's Deep Purple in Rock. The cover depicts a rock sculpture inspired by Mount Rushmore in which Alvin replaces Theodore Roosevelt while Simon and Theodore are seen on the ground.

== Scenario ==
Chipmunk Rock starts off with the Chipmunks practicing the song "Down by the Old Mill Stream" for a performance at the local PTA. David Seville enjoys what he hears and enthusiastically says "Sounds great. The PTA is just gonna love it, fellas!" Dave then departs and cautiously warns, "and remember: none of that rock and roll business." Alvin reassures the slightly skeptical father "Wouldn't think of it, Dave." Once Dave is out the door, Alvin quietly says "Hit it, fellas!" and then breaks into a rousing rendition of Kim Carnes' "Bette Davis Eyes."

Nine additional songs follow, with Theodore finally asking the boys, "What should we sing next?" Simon spots Dave coming up the driveway as Alvin says "How about 'Calling All Girls'?" The boys then resume singing "Down by the Old Mill Stream" just in time for Dave to walk in on them.

== Track listing ==
Side one
No.	Title	Original Artist	Length
1.	"Prelude: Dave and the Boys/Down by the Old Mill Stream" (Tell Taylor)	Bing Crosby, The Mills Brothers, Harry James, et al	0:31
2.	"Bette Davis Eyes" (Donna Weiss, Jackie DeShannon)	Jackie DeShannon (popularized by Kim Carnes)	3:27
3.	"Jessie's Girl (a.k.a. "Jessie's Squirrel")" (Rick Springfield)	Rick Springfield	3:10
4.	"Take a Chance on Me" (Benny Andersson, Björn Ulvaeus)	ABBA	3:30
5.	"Hit Me with Your Best Shot" (Eddie Schwartz)	Pat Benatar	2:42
6.	"Leader of the Pack" (George "Shadow" Morton, Jeff Barry, Ellie Greenwich)	The Shangri-Las	3:22

Side two
No.	Title	Original Artist	Length
1.	"Queen of Hearts" (Hank DeVito)	Dave Edmunds (popularized by Juice Newton)	3:15
2.	"Whip It" (Gerald Casale, Mark Mothersbaugh)	Devo	2:40
3.	"Heartbreaker" (Geoff Gill, Cliff Wade)	Pat Benatar	3:16
4.	"Hold on Tight" (Jeff Lynne)	Electric Light Orchestra	2:50
5.	"Losing You (I Really Wanna Lose You)" (Ross Bagdasarian Jr., Janice Karman, Jeff Silverman)	original song	3:54
6.	"Epilogue: Dave and the Boys/Down by the Old Mill Stream" (Tell Taylor)	Bing Crosby, The Mills Brothers, Harry James, et al	0:23

== Notes ==
The trio name-check the not-yet-created Chipettes in the song "Leader of the Pack," when Alvin balks at the idea of singing what he deems "a girl's song!" Theodore then jokes "So? You've never heard of the Chipettes?" Two years after the release of Chipmunk Rock, The Chipettes would come to be, and made their debut on the 1984 album Songs from Our TV Shows.

In Canada, the album reached number 44 in the pop charts.
