= The Very Best of The Chipmunks =

Greatest hits album by The Chipmunks
- Released: 1975
- Genre: Children's
- Label: United Artists
- Producer: Ross Bagdasarian

The Chipmunks chronology
The Chipmunks Go to the Movies (1969)	The Very Best of The Chipmunks (1975)	Chipmunk Punk (1980)

The Very Best of The Very Best of The Chipmunks with David Seville is a 1975 music album by Alvin and the Chipmunks, released by United Artists, containing ten tracks. A CD version contains only nine of the tracks, leaving out "Twinkle, Twinkle, Little Star".

== Track listing ==
=== Side One ===
1. "The Chipmunk Song (Christmas Don't Be Late)"
2. "Alvin's Harmonica"
3. "Ragtime Cowboy Joe"
4. "She Loves You"
5. "Twinkle, Twinkle, Little Star" (not on the Capitol re-release)

=== Side Two ===
1. "Witch Doctor"
2. "Do-Re-Mi"
3. "Tonight You Belong to Me"
4. "America the Beautiful"
5. "Supercalifragilisticexpialidocious"

Source: The Mad Music Archive
