= A Chipmunk Reunion =

1985 American TV special

- Written by: Ross Bagdasarian Jr. Janice Karman
- Directed by: Charles August Nichols
- Starring: Ross Bagdasarian, Jr. Janice Karman
- Music by: Dean Elliott
- Country of origin: United States

Production
- Producers: Ross Bagdasarian Jr. Janice Karman
- Running time: 24 minutes (without commercials)
- Production companies: Bagdasarian Productions; Ruby-Spears Enterprises

Original release
- Network: NBC
- Release: April 13, 1985

A Chipmunk Reunion is a 1985 animated television special produced by Bagdasarian Productions, in association with Ruby-Spears Enterprises, and is spun off of NBC's popular animated series, Alvin & the Chipmunks, starring the Chipmunks and the Chipettes.

The special originally aired on NBC on Saturday April 13, 1985, as a primetime special, in between seasons two and three of the series. When the series went into syndication in the fall of 1988, this special was included in the syndication package as a regular episode.

== Plot ==
Alvin, Simon and Theodore argue about when exactly they were born. But not even their adoptive father, Dave Seville, knows the exact date (he celebrates their birthday on the day he found them), so Alvin decides that the only way to find out would be to look for their long lost mother. When Dave comes downstairs the next morning and sees the Chipettes in the house (the boys asked them to look after Dave), he realizes that the boys went to find their mother, and fears that they could get hurt by wild animals in the forest. So, he sets out to find them, while the girls join him on his search.

Meanwhile, as the boys search the forest, they imagine what their mother might be like (except Alvin, who wonders why their mother abandoned them), while asking other forest animals about her (with no such luck). Later that night, the boys decide to go home, when they encounter a wild boar that chases them into a log, then grabs the log and throws it to the bottom of a mountainside, knocking them unconscious. However, someone finds them, and takes them into their home.

When the boys wake up the next day, they find themselves inside the home of their long lost mother named Vinny, who is happy to see her boys again. Meanwhile, Dave and the Chipettes are right on the boys' trail, while Dave wonders why they left him. However, the girls assure him that just because the boys are looking for their mother, it doesn't mean that they don't love him anymore. Back at Vinny's home, the boys reminisce with her about when they were babies, and then she tucks them in with a tendersweet lullaby that she used to sing to them when they were babies.

The next morning, a bitter Alvin claims that Vinny never loved him and his brothers to begin with, because she left them on a stranger's doorstep. However, Vinny then explains that she had her reasons for doing this, those reasons being that the boys were too young to survive the long winter, and that there was a severe food shortage. However, she knew of a man (Dave Seville) who was very kind to the forest animals, and had no choice but to leave them with him. She then admits that giving them up was the hardest thing she ever had to do.

The boys decide to have Vinny come and live with them, but she tells them that she doesn't know anything about life in the city and that she wants them to live with her. Alvin, failing to understand and not wanting to leave Dave behind, walks away to a nearby log, while Simon and Theodore try to comfort him, telling him that their lives are completely different from that of their mother, but it doesn't mean that she doesn't love them. Suddenly, the boar comes back and attacks them. After missing the boys, the boar sees Vinny, and rams into her, injuring her badly. A weakened Vinny then backs up by the cliffside, and jumps up to a nearby branch, while the boar misses and falls into the river to his death. The boys hurry to their mother and fear the worst. They take her home and tend her wounds, while Alvin apologizes for his earlier attitude.

The next day, the boys find that Vinny is nowhere to be seen, and when they reach downstairs, they learn that Vinny and the others are throwing them a surprise party. Dave and The Chipettes, all of whom are tired, find them but decide not to disturb them. However, the boys notice Dave, and run up to him and hug him, telling him that they are coming back with him after all, but they'll be back in the forest for visits. After another celebration at Vinny's house, this time with Dave and the girls, the special ends with the boys later that night back at home in bed. Then Alvin, after being asked what his birthday wish was, says that he initially wished they were like other families, but he has now realized that they have parents who love them very much.

== Voice actors ==
- Ross Bagdasarian, Jr. - David "Dave" Seville, Alvin, Simon
- Janice Karman - Theodore, Brittany, Jeanette, Eleanor, Allie
- June Foray - Vinny
- Frank Welker - Boar
- Marc Fischbach - Forest Ranger

== Songs ==
- Mother and Child Reunion - Written by and originally performed by Paul Simon
- Vinny's Lullaby
- Vinny's Blues
- Shake It Up - Written by Ric Ocasek and originally performed by The Cars

== Home video ==
This special has been released twice on home video. The first time was on VHS in 1989 on Alvin and the Chipmunks in The Chipmunk Family Tree (from The Chipmunk Video Library), along with the season 1 episode "The Chipmunks Story". The second time was on DVD on September 8, 2009 as part of the set titled The Very First Alvin Show (from Paramount Pictures), along with the first episode of The Alvin Show and the special Rockin' Through the Decades.
