= The A-Files: Alien Songs =

Studio album by Alvin and the Chipmunks
- Released: May 26, 1998
- Labels: Chipmunk; Sony; Columbia
- Producers: Jai Winding, Ross Bagdasarian and Janice Karman

Alvin and the Chipmunks chronology
Club Chipmunk: The Dance Mixes (1996)	The A-Files: Alien Songs (1998)	Greatest Hits: Still Squeaky After All These Years (1999)

Professional ratings
Review scores
Source	Rating
Allmusic	2.5/5 stars
The Arizona Daily Star	(mixed)

The A-Files: Alien Songs is a 1998 album by Alvin and the Chipmunks, released by Sony Wonder. The album's title and cover art parodied the Fox TV series The X-Files, and most of the songs have a science fiction theme.

== Track listing ==
1. "The Purple People Eater" (Sheb Wooley; originally performed by Sheb Wooley) - The Chipmunks – 3:35
2. "Men in Black" (Will Smith/Patrice Rushen/Terri McFadden/Freddie Washington; originally performed by Will Smith and featured in the 1997 film of the same name) - The Chipmunks – 3:46
3. "X-Files Theme" (Mark Snow; originally featured in the television series The X-Files) - Alvin and Brittany – 3:06
4. "Rocket Man" (Elton John/Bernie Taupin; originally performed by Elton John) - The Chipmunks – 3:36
5. "Venus" (Robbie van Leeuwen; originally performed by Shocking Blue and popularized by Bananarama) - The Chipettes – 3:33
6. "The Time Warp" (Richard O'Brien/Richard Hartley; originally featured in the 1973 musical The Rocky Horror Show and its 1975 film adaptation) - The Chipmunks and The Chipettes – 3:41
7. "People Are Strange" (Jim Morrison/Robby Krieger; originally performed by The Doors) - The Chipmunks – 3:23
8. "Star Wars: Cantina Band" (John Williams; originally featured in the 1977 film Star Wars) - The Chipmunks – 2:44
9. "Mr. Spaceman" (Jim McGuinn; originally performed by The Byrds) - The Chipmunks – 2:56
10. "Destination Unknown" (Dale Bozzio/Terry Bozzio/Warren Cuccurullo; originally performed by Missing Persons) - The Chipettes – 3:32

Sources: Amazon AllMusic
