= Alvin and the Chipmunks (soundtrack) =

2007 soundtrack albums

Alvin and the Chipmunks (Original Motion Picture Soundtrack)

Soundtrack album by The Chipmunks
- Released: November 20, 2007
- Length: 48:17
- Labels: Chipmunk; 20th Century Fox; Fox Music; Rhino; Razor & Tie
- Producer: Ali Dee Theodore

The Chipmunks chronology
Little Alvin and the Mini-Munks (2004)	Alvin and the Chipmunks (Original Motion Picture Soundtrack) (2007)	Christmas with The Chipmunks (2008 reissue) (2008)

Alvin and the Chipmunks (Original Motion Picture Score)

Film score by Christopher Lennertz
- Released: September 19, 2008
- Recorded: 2007
- Genre: Film score
- Length: 35:39
- Labels: 20th Century Fox; Fox Music; La-La Land Records

Christopher Lennertz chronology
The Comebacks (2007)	Alvin and the Chipmunks (2007)	Meet the Spartans (2008)

Alvin and the Chipmunks (Original Motion Picture Soundtrack) is the soundtrack to the 2007 jukebox musical comedy film Alvin and the Chipmunks based on the characters of the same name created by Ross Bagdasarian Sr. Released on November 20, 2007, through Rhino Records, Razor & Tie and Chipmunk Records, the album featured original songs as well as existing musical numbers from the Chipmunks' discography. Ali Dee Theodore served as an executive producer on the soundtrack. An album, consisting of an original score composed by Christopher Lennertz, released as Alvin and the Chipmunks (Original Motion Picture Score) as a limited edition album on September 19, 2008 through La-La Land Records.

Alvin and the Chipmunks is directed by Tim Hill and starred Jason Lee, David Cross and Cameron Richardson while Justin Long, Matthew Gray Gubler and Jesse McCartney voice the titular Chipmunks; Bagdasarian Sr., Steve Vining and Janice Karman provides the playback singing for the Chipmunks.

The soundtrack eventually peaked at Billboard 200 and topped the soundtrack charts within the few weeks of its release. It sold over 1 million copies in the United States and was certified Platinum by the Recording Industry Association of America, thereby becoming the group's sixth album, third Platinum album and first since Chipmunks in Low Places (1992). It also won the American Music Award for Top Soundtrack in 2008.

== Album information and release ==
The film featured eight original songs written by Ali Dee Theodore who served as the executive producer of the album. However, his contributions were credited to the DeeTown Syndicate under the DeeTown Entertainment, Inc. The film features a re-recorded version of "The Chipmunk Song (Christmas Don't Be Late)" (1958) and "Witch Doctor" (1961), along with covers performed by the Chipmunks include—Daniel Powter's "Bad Day" (2005), "Funkytown" (1980) by Lipps Inc. "Only You (And You Alone)" (1955) by the Platters. The soundtrack was released through Rhino Entertainment and Razor & Tie labels on November 20, 2007, three weeks before the film's release. A soundtrack sampler was released along with the DVD of the film on April 1, 2008 in a two-pack sold exclusively at Walmart and featured five original songs exclusively produced for the album.

== Reception ==
=== Critical ===
James Christopher Monger of AllMusic wrote "kids who missed out on the Chipmunks' '70s heyday or the trio's animated series a decade later will probably discover a lot of potential Christmas presents in the experience, and the inclusion of the original "Christmas Song" and "Witch Doctor" shows that the producers at least feel a little bit guilty about dressing the furry critters up as gangsta rappers on the cover." Chris Willman of Entertainment Weekly wrote "The soundtrack's producer shows us how to get that squeaky helium sound. But didn't anyone think to film celeb Chipmunk voices Jesse McCartney and Justin Long enunciating at half speed?"

In 2017, Jamie Milton of NME said the song "Get Munk'd" was one of the worst songs of the 2000s. She wrote: "It's chipmunks singing about sex. Nothing gets worse."

=== Commercial ===
In December 2007, the album debuted at number 133 on the Billboard 200. In its second week of sales, the album jumped to number 67 on the chart, and saw an upward trend within the consecutive weeks. The album's highest peak was number 5 on the Billboard 200, making it the group's highest on the chart album since Chipmunks in Low Places (which peaked at number 21). Following Alvin and the Chipmunk's DVD release, the soundtrack went back into the top ten from number 16 to number five with a 111% sales increase; it sold 51,000 copies of what was its 18th week on the chart and was the issue's greatest gainer. According to Robert Kraft, executive vice president at Fox Music, he attributed the soundtrack's success as it offered "groovy music that people dig".

== Track listing ==
=== Alvin and the Chipmunks (Original Motion Picture Soundtrack) ===
Track listing
No.	Title	Writer(s)	Performer(s)	Length
1.	"Bad Day"	Daniel Powter	The Chipmunks	3:47
2.	"The Chipmunk Song (Christmas Don't Be Late)" (DeeTown OG Mix)	Ross Bagdasarian Sr.	The Chipmunks	2:34
3.	"Follow Me Now (Note: Denotes original song)"	The DeeTown Syndicate for DeeTown Entertainment, Inc.	The Chipmunks featuring Jason Gleed	3:07
4.	"How We Roll"	The DeeTown Syndicate for DeeTown Entertainment, Inc.	The Chipmunks	3:54
5.	"Witch Doctor"	Ross Bagdasarian Sr.	The Chipmunks featuring Chris Classic	3:03
6.	"Come Get It"	The DeeTown Syndicate for DeeTown Entertainment, Inc.	The Chipmunks featuring Rebecca Jones	3:34
7.	"The Chipmunk Song (Christmas Don't Be Late)" (DeeTown Rock Mix)	Ross Bagdasarian Sr.	The Chipmunks	2:14
8.	"Funkytown"	Steve Greenberg	The Chipmunks	3:34
9.	"Get You Goin'"	The DeeTown Syndicate for DeeTown Entertainment, Inc.		3:16
10.	"Coast 2 Coast"	The DeeTown Syndicate for DeeTown Entertainment, Inc.	The Chipmunks	2:47
11.	"Mess Around"	The DeeTown Syndicate for DeeTown Entertainment, Inc.	The Chipmunks	3:20
12.	"Only You (And You Alone)"	Buck Ram, Ande Rand	The Chipmunks	2:50
13.	"Ain't No Party"	The DeeTown Syndicate for DeeTown Entertainment, Inc.	The Chipmunks featuring Rebecca Jones and Chris Classic	2:43
14.	"Get Munk'd"	The DeeTown Syndicate for DeeTown Entertainment, Inc.	The Chipmunks featuring Al D	3:01

Bonus tracks
No.	Title	Writer(s)	Performer(s)	Length
15.	"Witch Doctor (Note: Performed by Ross Bagdasarian, Sr. as David Seville. This version is technically without the Chipmunks.)" (classic version)	Ross Bagdasarian Sr.	The Chipmunks	2:15
16.	"The Chipmunk Song (Christmas Don't Be Late) (Note: Featuring Ross Bagdasarian, Sr. as David Seville (speaking only) and the singing voice for Alvin, Simon and Theodore.)" (classic version)	Ross Bagdasarian Sr.	The Chipmunks	2:17

==== CD Sampler ====
Track listing
No.	Title	Writer(s)	Performer(s)	Length
1.	"How We Roll"	The DeeTown Syndicate for DeeTown Entertainment, Inc.	The Chipmunks	3:54
2.	"Get You Goin'"	The DeeTown Syndicate for DeeTown Entertainment, Inc.	The Chipmunks	3:16
3.	"Get Munk'd"	The DeeTown Syndicate for DeeTown Entertainment, Inc.	The Chipmunks featuring Al D	3:01
4.	"Ain't No Party"	The DeeTown Syndicate for DeeTown Entertainment, Inc.	The Chipmunks featuring Rebecca Jones and Chris Classic	2:41
5.	"Mess Around"	The DeeTown Syndicate for DeeTown Entertainment, Inc.	The Chipmunks	3:20

=== Alvin and the Chipmunks (Original Motion Picture Score) ===
Track listing
No.	Title	Length
1.	"Main Title"	1:07
2.	"I'm Late"	0:40
3.	"Ever?"	2:07
4.	"Dave's Theme"	0:48
5.	"No More Nuts/Storing Food for the Winter"	4:43
6.	"Rescue the Gear/Toaster Waffles"	1:44
7.	"Leave Me Alone"	2:17
8.	"I'll Clean Out My Office"	1:35
9.	"Are You Awake?"	1:13
10.	"Christmas Morning"	4:09
11.	"Live with Uncle Ian"	2:36
12.	"Dinner!"	2:07
13.	"Dave Remembers/Missing the Boys"	1:08
14.	"Get Them!"	1:03
15.	"Dave's Phone Call"	1:06
16.	"Theodore's Nightmare"	1:05
17.	"I Want to Go Home"	1:28
18.	"Alvin!!!/You'll Never Take Us Alive"	4:09

== Personnel ==
- Ross Bagdasarian Jr. — lead guitars and the spoken voice of Dave on track 2 and the sung vocal of Alvin
- Steve Vining — bass on track 8 and the sung vocal of Simon
- Janice Karman — the sung vocal of Theodore
- Jason Lee — spoken voiceover on track 7 (as "David Seville")
- Justin Long — spoken voiceover on tracks 7 (as "Alvin")
- Matthew Gray Gubler — spoken voiceover on tracks 7 (as "Simon")
- Jesse McCartney — spoken voiceover on tracks 7 (as "Theodore")
- Jason Gleed — guest vocals and rhythm guitars
- Chris Classic — secondary guest lead vocals
- Rebecca Jones — tertiary guest lead vocals
- Ali Dee Theodore — keyboards, bass (except track 8) and drum programming
- Alana Da Fonseca — uncharacterized backing vocals
- Joey Katsaros — manipulation of original concept album samples and uncharacterized backing vocals
- Zach Danziger — live drums and uncharacterized backing vocals
- Vinny Alfieri — uncharacterized backing vocals
- Andy Richards — string synthesizer on track 4, piano on track 8
- Ross Bagdasarian Sr. — piano on track 15, the singing voice of Dave on track 15, and the spoken voice of Dave, as well as singing voices for Alvin, Simon, and Theodore on track 16
- Aaron Sandlofer — keyboards, bass, guitar, drums & uncharacterized backing vocals

== Chart performance ==
Weekly chart performance for Alvin and the Chipmunks (Original Motion Picture Soundtrack)
Chart (2008)	Peak position
Scottish Albums (OCC)	58
UK Albums (OCC)	61
UK Physical Albums (OCC)	62
UK Soundtrack Albums (OCC)	1
US Billboard 200	5
US Top Current Album Sales (Billboard)	5
US Top Soundtracks (Billboard)	1

Year-end chart performance for Alvin and the Chipmunks (Original Motion Picture Soundtrack)
Chart (2008)	Position
US Billboard 200	38
US Soundtrack Albums (Billboard)	5

=== Song charts ===
List of songs with selected chart positions
Title	Performer(s)	Peak chart positions		
Title	Performer(s)	US	US Digital	CAN
"Witch Door" (2007 version)	The Chipmunks featuring Chris Classic	62	16	—
"The Chipmunk Song (Christmas Don't Be Late)" (2007 version)	The Chipmunks	66	28	64
"Bad Day"	The Chipmunks	67	51	—
"Funkytown"	The Chipmunks	86	—	—
"—" denotes a recording that did not chart.

== Certifications ==
Region	Certification	Certified units/sales
United Kingdom (BPI)	Silver	60,000^{*}
United States (RIAA)	Platinum	1,000,000^{^}
^{*} Sales figures based on certification alone.^{^} Shipments figures based on certification alone.

== Accolades ==
List of accolades for Alvin and the Chipmunks (Original Motion Picture Soundtrack)
Award	Category	Result	Ref.
American Music Awards	Top Soundtrack	Won	
