= Alvin and the Chipmunks (video game) =

2007 video game

- North American Nintendo DS cover art featuring Alvin (right), Simon (left), and Theodore (center).
- Developer: Sensory Sweep Studios
- Publisher: Brash Entertainment
- Series: Alvin and the Chipmunks
- Platforms: Nintendo DS, Wii, PlayStation 2, Microsoft Windows
- Release: NA: December 4, 2007; EU: December 7, 2007; AU: January 11, 2008
- Genre: Rhythm
- Modes: Single-player, multiplayer

Alvin and the Chipmunks is a 2007 video game based on the film of the same name. It follows The Chipmunks as they play their way from small venues (such as a high school prom or a civic center) to massive crowds at Burning Munk and ultimately Rockathonapalooza. The soundtrack features 40 songs, including "All the Small Things" by Blink-182, "It's Tricky" by Run-D.M.C., "Everything You Want" by Vertical Horizon, and "Heartbreak Hotel" by Elvis Presley. The gameplay itself is similar to other rhythm games such as Rock Band and Guitar Hero. Jason Lee reprised his role as David Seville in the story cutscenes while Ross Bagdasarian, Jr. and Janice Karman reprise their roles from the 1980s-2000s cartoons. It preceded games Alvin and the Chipmunks: The Squeakquel (2009) and Alvin and the Chipmunks: Chipwrecked (2011).

== Plot ==
The Chipmunks play at various venues to save their favorite music club. Each venue is unlocked once a trio-set of songs have been completed.

== Reception ==
| Platform | Aggregator | Score | Reviews |
|---|---|---|---|
| Wii | GameRankings | 37 | 2 |
| Wii | Metacritic | 31 | 3 |
| PS2 | GameRankings | 42 | 2 |
| PS2 | Metacritic | 35 | 3 |
| Windows | GameRankings | 39 | 1 |
| Windows | Metacritic | 39 | 1 |
| NDS | GameRankings | 45 | 0 |
| NDS | Metacritic | 45 | 1 |

The game received generally negative reviews. GameRankings gave the game a 37/100 for the Wii version based on 2 reviews, a 42/100 for the PS2 version based on 2 reviews, a 39/100 based on 1 review, and a 45/100 for the DS version without any reviews.
