= Rockin' Through the Decades =

- Created by: Ross Bagdasarian, Sr. (characters)
- Written by: Ross Bagdasarian Jr. Janice Karman
- Directed by: Steve Karman
- Starring: Will Smith (host); Ross Bagdasarian, Jr. Janice Karman; Ben Vereen; Richard Moll; Kenny Loggins; Raven-Symoné; Shelley Duvall; Markie Post; Little Richard
- Country of origin: United States
- Original language: English

Production
- Producers: Steve Karman; Walt Kubiak; Elana Lesser; Cliff Ruby
- Running time: 19 minutes
- Production companies: Bagdasarian Productions; Murakami-Wolf-Swenson

Original release
- Network: NBC
- Release: December 9, 1990

Rockin' Through the Decades is a live-action/animated TV special based on characters from Alvin and the Chipmunks. It was directed by Steve Karman, produced by Bagdasarian Productions, and premiered on NBC on December 9, 1990.

The special was released on VHS by Buena Vista Home Video in 1992 as Rockin' with the Chipmunks and aired on the Disney Channel the same year. On September 8, 2009, it was released on DVD as part of the Paramount Home Entertainment release The Very First Alvin Show, which also included the first episode of The Alvin Show and the 1985 special A Chipmunk Reunion.

== Cast ==
- Will Smith - Himself (credited as Fresh Prince)
- Ross Bagdasarian, Jr. - Alvin and Simon (voice)
- Janice Karman - Theodore and Brittany (voice)
- Ben Vereen - Himself
- Richard Moll - Himself
- Kenny Loggins - Himself
- Raven-Symoné - Herself
- Shelley Duvall - Herself
- Markie Post - Herself
- Little Richard - Himself
- Michael Jackson - Himself (archive footage)
- Thomas H. Watkins - Soda Jerk
- Sherwood Ball - Rapper (voice)
- Ed Sullivan - Himself (archive footage in The Ed Sullivan Show)
- Ross Bagdasarian, Sr. - Alvin, Simon, Theodore, Dave Seville (voice archive footage in The Alvin Show) and Himself (archive footage in The Ed Sullivan Show)
- June Foray - Little Girl (voice archive footage in The Alvin Show)

== Rockin' with the Chipmunks ==
Rockin' with the Chipmunks made significant changes to the featured songs.

1. "Witch Doctor"
  1. Intro medley, done by Alvin in different styles
    1. Little Richard (style of "Tutti Frutti")
    2. Elvis Presley (style of "Blue Suede Shoes")
    3. Jimi Hendrix (style of "Foxy Lady")
    4. Bob Dylan (style of "Like a Rolling Stone")
    5. Michael Jackson (style of "Billie Jean")
    6. Bruce Springsteen (style of "Born in the U.S.A.")
2. "Tutti Frutti"/"Heartbreak Hotel" (medley, 1950s)
3. "Surfin' Safari"/"She Loves You"/"(I Can't Get No) Satisfaction" (medley, 1960s)
4. "Crocodile Rock" (1970s)
5. "Smooth Criminal"/"Beat It" (medley, Alvin added to the original music videos, 1980s)
6. "Sleigh Ride" (original Christmas-themed hip hop song, 1990s)

Segments from two episodes of The Alvin Show, A Chipmunk Christmas and an episode of The Ed Sullivan Show are also featured. "Alvin's Harmonica" briefly plays during the live-action introduction of the 1950s segment. The "Sleigh Ride" segment is preceded by a rap from Smith, giving his perspective on what to expect of the 1990s.

== Soundtrack album ==
Rockin' Through the Decades

Soundtrack album by The Chipmunks
- Released: January 25, 1991
- Recorded: November 1988 (track 1), July–September 1989 (tracks 2–11), December 1990 (track 12)
- Genre: Children's music
- Label: EMI America (US), Virgin (International)
- Producer: Tom Chase, Steve Rucker (track 1), Ross Bagdasarian, Janice Karman (tracks 2–11), Jimmy Jam and Terry Lewis (track 12)

The Chipmunks chronology
Born To Rock (1988)	Rockin' Through the Decades (1991)	The Chipmunks Rock the House (1991)

A soundtrack album also titled Rockin' Through the Decades was released by Chipmunk Records in 1991. It contained all of the songs from the TV special, plus three additional songs.

1. "Witch Doctor (Decades Mix)"
2. "Tutti Frutti"
3. "She Loves You ('90s Reprise)"
4. "(I Can't Get No) Satisfaction"
5. "Girls Just Want to Have Fun" - The Chipettes
6. "Beat It ('90s Remix)"
7. "Heartbreak Hotel"
8. "Crocodile Rock"
9. "Surfin' Safari"
10. "Oh, Pretty Woman"
11. "Johnny B. Goode"
12. "Sleigh Ride"

== Broadcast ==
The special was broadcast in the United States on NBC on December 9, 1990. The special was rebroadcast on USA Network twice in December 1992 followed by two more airings in December 1993.
