= The Chipettes =

Fictional girl group from Alvin and the Chipmunks

- The Chipettes as they appear in The Chipmunk Adventure. From left to right: Jeanette, Brittany and Eleanor

Background information
- Origin: California, United States
- Genres: Pop; show tunes; musical
- Years active: 1983–present
- Labels: Chipmunk; Liberty; Sony; Rhino; Columbia
- Spinoff of: Alvin and the Chipmunks
- Members: Brittany Miller; Jeanette Miller; Eleanor Miller

The Chipettes are a fictional girl group from the Alvin and the Chipmunks franchise consisting of three female anthropomorphic chipmunk singers: Brittany, Jeanette, and Eleanor, alongside their adoptive human mother, Beatrice Miller. They first appeared in the animated television series Alvin and the Chipmunks in 1983. In this and related materials, the Chipettes served as female featured characters in their own right, starring in numerous episodes. The title of the show was changed from Alvin and the Chipmunks to simply The Chipmunks in 1988 to reflect this. In the animated television series and the 1987 animated film The Chipmunk Adventure, all of the Chipettes were voiced by their creator, Janice Karman, the wife of Ross Bagdasarian Jr. (son of Ross Bagdasarian, who created the Chipmunks). Karman also wrote and voiced the Chipettes' dialogue on their studio albums, while studio singers Susan Boyd, Shelby Daniel and Katherine Coon provided their singing voices. In the animated television series Alvinnn!!! and the Chipmunks, Eleanor is voiced by Vanessa Bagdasarian, the daughter of Ross Bagdasarian Jr. and Janice Karman.

The first designs for the Chipettes were drafted by Corny Cole for their 1983 cartoon series debut. These designs were later revamped by Sandra Berez for The Chipmunk Adventure and the later seasons of the show.

== Origins ==
The origins of the Chipettes can be traced to the 1982 Alvin and the Chipmunks album The Chipmunks Go Hollywood. On this album, Alvin sings a duet with a female character billed as Charlene the Chipette. Charlene is featured on the song "You're the One That I Want" from the soundtrack of the motion picture Grease. Charlene was depicted on the album cover as having a long, golden blonde ponytail, and seems to have been the basis for the later character of Brittany. Janice Karman said in interviews that she created the Chipettes because she and Ross Bagdasarian Jr. couldn't do girl songs and wanted Chipmunks who are females and have counter personalities of the main three Chipmunks. The first Chipette she created was Brittany in 1982.

The Chipettes, redesigned as far more realistic chipmunks, appear in Alvin and the Chipmunks: The Squeakquel. In the film, Christina Applegate, Anna Faris, and Amy Poehler voices the Chipettes. "There has been a lot of talk about it," noted Janice Karman, one of the film's producers. "A lot of people have been asking about the little girls." Christina Applegate, Anna Faris, and Amy Poehler reprised their roles from the previous film, Alvin and the Chipmunks: Chipwrecked, which was released on December 16, 2011. The Chipettes also appeared in Alvin and the Chipmunks: The Road Chip, released in 2015; Christina Applegate and Anna Faris again voice Brittany and Jeanette respectively, but Kaley Cuoco replaces Amy Poehler as the voice of Eleanor.

== Discography ==
With the exception of 1987's The Chipmunk Adventure soundtrack (LP) and 1988's The Chipmunks and the Chipettes: Born to Rock, the discography of the Chipettes consists of featured appearances on Alvin and the Chipmunks recordings.

=== Albums ===
- 1982: The Chipmunks Go Hollywood
- 1984: Songs from Our TV Shows
- 1987: The Chipmunk Adventure
- 1988: The Chipmunks and The Chipettes: Born to Rock
- 1988: Solid Gold Chipmunks: 30 Years of Great Hits
- 1990: Rockin' Through the Decades
- 1991: The Chipmunks Rock the House
- 1992: Chipmunks in Low Places
- 1994: Here's Looking at Me! 35 Years of Chipmunk Classics
- 1994: A Very Merry Chipmunk
- 1995: When You Wish Upon a Chipmunk
- 1996: Club Chipmunk: The Dance Mixes
- 1998: The A-Files: Alien Songs
- 2004: Little Alvin and the Mini-Munks
- 2009: Alvin and the Chipmunks: The Squeakquel: Original Motion Picture Soundtrack
- 2011: Alvin and the Chipmunks: Chipwrecked: Music from the Motion Picture
- 2015: We're the Chipmunks (Music From the TV Show)
- 2015: Alvin and the Chipmunks: The Road Chip: Original Motion Picture Soundtrack

=== Singles ===
- 1994: "I Don't Want To Be Alone For Christmas (Unless I'm Alone With You)"
- 1996: "Macarena (with Alvin and the Chipmunks/Love Shack (with Alvin and the Chipmunks)"

==== 2009 ====
- "Put Your Records On"
- "Hot n Cold"
- "Single Ladies (Put a Ring on It)"
- "So What"
- "The Song" (feat. Queensberry)
- "No One" (feat. Jake Zyrus)

==== 2011 ====
- "Whip My Tail"
- "We No Speak Americano"/"Conga" (feat. Barnetta Dafonseca)
- "Survivor"
- "SOS"
- "Hello"

==== 2012 ====
- "Witch Doctor 2.0"

==== 2025 ====
- "Golden"

== Filmography ==
- Alvin and the Chipmunks (1983–1990) – TV series
- Alvin and the Chipmunks and the Amazing Computer (1985) – Stage Show
- The 1986 Macy's Thanksgiving Day Parade
- The Chipmunk Adventure (1987)
- Rockin' Through the Decades (1990)
- Alvin and the Chipmunks Meet the Wolfman (2000)
- Little Alvin and the Mini-Munks (2003)
- Alvin and the Chipmunks: The Squeakquel (2009)
- Alvin and the Chipmunks: Chipwrecked (2011)
- Alvinnn!!! and the Chipmunks (2015–2023) – TV series
- Alvin and the Chipmunks: The Road Chip (2015)

== Personnel ==
- Brittany Miller – lead and backing vocals
- Jeanette Miller – lead and backing vocals
- Eleanor Miller – lead and backing vocals

== Sources ==
- Regarding the first and subsequent appearances of the Chipettes on television — https://web.archive.org/web/20080707060026/http://www.tv.com/alvin-and-the-chipmunks/show/2827/episode.html
- Regarding Janice Karman as the primary voice actress for the Chipettes —https://web.archive.org/web/20121106104019/http://www.tv.com/shows/alvin-and-the-chipmunks/cast/
- Regarding the history of the Chipettes on The Chipmunks TV series and in the Chipmunk Adventure — https://web.archive.org/web/20120213135927/http://www.chipmunks.com/history.php
- Regarding the Chipettes creation for the musical medium and their discography — https://web.archive.org/web/20060821114324/http://www.roctober.com/roctober/chipmunks.html
- Janice Karman on the possibility of the Chipettes appearing in a sequel to the recent Alvin and the Chipmunks film —
- Regarding the fictional character history of the Chipettes as outlined in various episodes of the television series — https://web.archive.org/web/20080707060026/http://www.tv.com/alvin-and-the-chipmunks/show/2827/episode.html
