= Alvin and the Chipmunks: Chipwrecked =

2011 film by Mike Mitchell

- Theatrical release poster
- Directed by: Mike Mitchell
- Written by: Jonathan Aibel; Glenn Berger
- Based on: Alvin and the Chipmunks by Ross Bagdasarian Sr.; The Chipettes by Janice Karman
- Produced by: Janice Karman; Ross Bagdasarian Jr.
- Starring: Jason Lee; David Cross; Jenny Slate; Justin Long; Matthew Gray Gubler; Jesse McCartney; Amy Poehler; Anna Faris; Christina Applegate
- Cinematography: Thomas E. Ackerman
- Edited by: Peter Amundson
- Music by: Mark Mothersbaugh
- Production companies: Fox 2000 Pictures; Regency Enterprises; Bagdasarian Company
- Distributed by: 20th Century Fox
- Release date: December 16, 2011
- Running time: 87 minutes
- Country: United States
- Language: English
- Budget: $75–80 million
- Box office: $349.1 million

Alvin and the Chipmunks: Chipwrecked is a 2011 American jukebox musical comedy film directed by Mike Mitchell and written by Jonathan Aibel and Glenn Berger, based on the characters Alvin and the Chipmunks and the Chipettes. It is the third installment in the live-action Alvin and the Chipmunks film series, following Alvin and the Chipmunks: The Squeakquel (2009). The film stars Jason Lee, David Cross, Jenny Slate, Luisa D'Oliveira, Andy Buckley, Tucker Albrizzi and Phyllis Smith, with Justin Long, Matthew Gray Gubler, Jesse McCartney, Amy Poehler, Anna Faris, and Christina Applegate reprising their roles from the first two films and joined by Alan Tudyk. In the film, playing around while aboard a cruise ship, the Chipmunks and the Chipettes go overboard and end up stranded on a tropical island, where they discover their new turf is not as deserted as it seems.

Chipwrecked was released in the United States on December 16, 2011 by 20th Century Fox. Despite receiving generally negative reviews from critics, the film was successful at the box office, grossing $349.1 million against its budget of $75–80 million. A fourth film, The Road Chip, was released in 2015.

== Plot ==
Two years after the events of the second film, Dave Seville, the Chipmunks, and the Chipettes embark on a cruise to attend the International Music Awards. While aboard, Alvin causes mischief by encouraging a water gun fight in the adult section of the ship, prompting Dave to apologize to the captain over dinner. Disobeying Dave's instructions, the Chipettes sneak into the ship's dance club while Alvin and Simon head to the casino. Dave reunites with his former supervisor Ian Hawke while discovering he works as the ship's safety officer dressed as a pelican; Ian sets to inform the captain if the Chipmunks and Chipettes cause further trouble. After catching them in the act, Dave warns them of missing the International Music Awards. The next day, Alvin goes parasailing on a kite with the others attached, but strong winds carry them away into the Pacific Ocean. Dave attempts to use a hang-glider to find them but is stopped by Ian, causing both to also be stranded at sea.

The Chipmunks find a deserted island where they meet a castaway named Zoe. At her treehouse, Eleanor injures her ankle and Simon is bitten by a spider; its venom results in a drastic personality shift, causing Simon to believe he is a French adventurer named "Simone". Later, Zoe takes "Simone", Jeanette, Eleanor, and Theodore to a lake, where "Simone" discovers a cave hidden behind a waterfall and retrieves a gold bracelet, which he gives to Jeanette. Meanwhile, Dave enlists Ian's help to find the same island and rescue the Chipmunks.

The next day, Brittany and Alvin spot the island's active volcano, prompting the Chipmunks to prepare a raft to evacuate. While Jeanette and "Simone" look for food, "Simone" is knocked unconscious and Jeanette is abducted; upon waking, Simon returns to his original personality with no recollection of the events after the bite. The Chipmunks discover that Zoe has taken Jeanette and head towards the waterfall, where Dave and Alvin witness Zoe forcing Jeanette to retrieve treasure in the cave while tied to a rope. Zoe reveals that she originally came to the island seeking the treasure, but her decade of isolation caused memory loss and an unhealthy obsession for her search.

As the volcano begins to erupt, Zoe accidentally releases the rope, and Jeanette runs with Dave and Alvin to the raft. At a log crossing, Zoe tries to recapture Jeanette with the rope until Alvin cuts it with a Swiss Army knife previously confiscated by Dave. However, the log collapses, leaving Dave hanging from a branch and prompting Alvin and a reformed Ian to convince Zoe to help save him. The group escapes the eruption and safely boards the raft.

Stranded once again, Jeanette forgives Zoe and gives her the gold bracelet that Simon had earlier retrieved. Alvin also apologizes to Dave for his antics on the ship, and the group is eventually rescued. The Chipmunks and Chipettes perform at the International Music Awards. Ian begins a new screenwriting career by selling a screenplay about Zoe's story to Hollywood, finally restoring his fortune and making Zoe famous. On the flight home to Los Angeles, Alvin plays a prank on the passengers by announcing they are en route to Timbuktu, much to Dave's annoyance.

== Cast ==
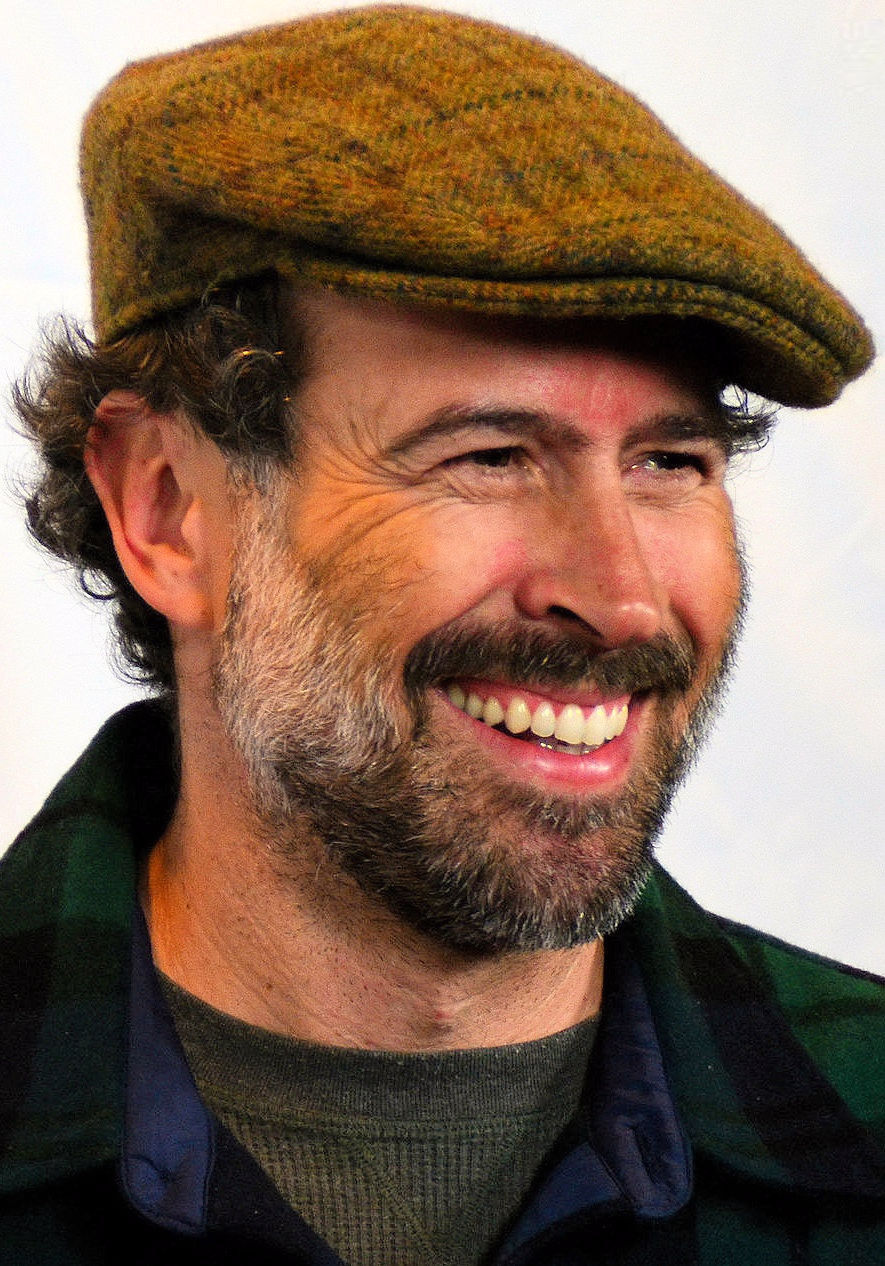
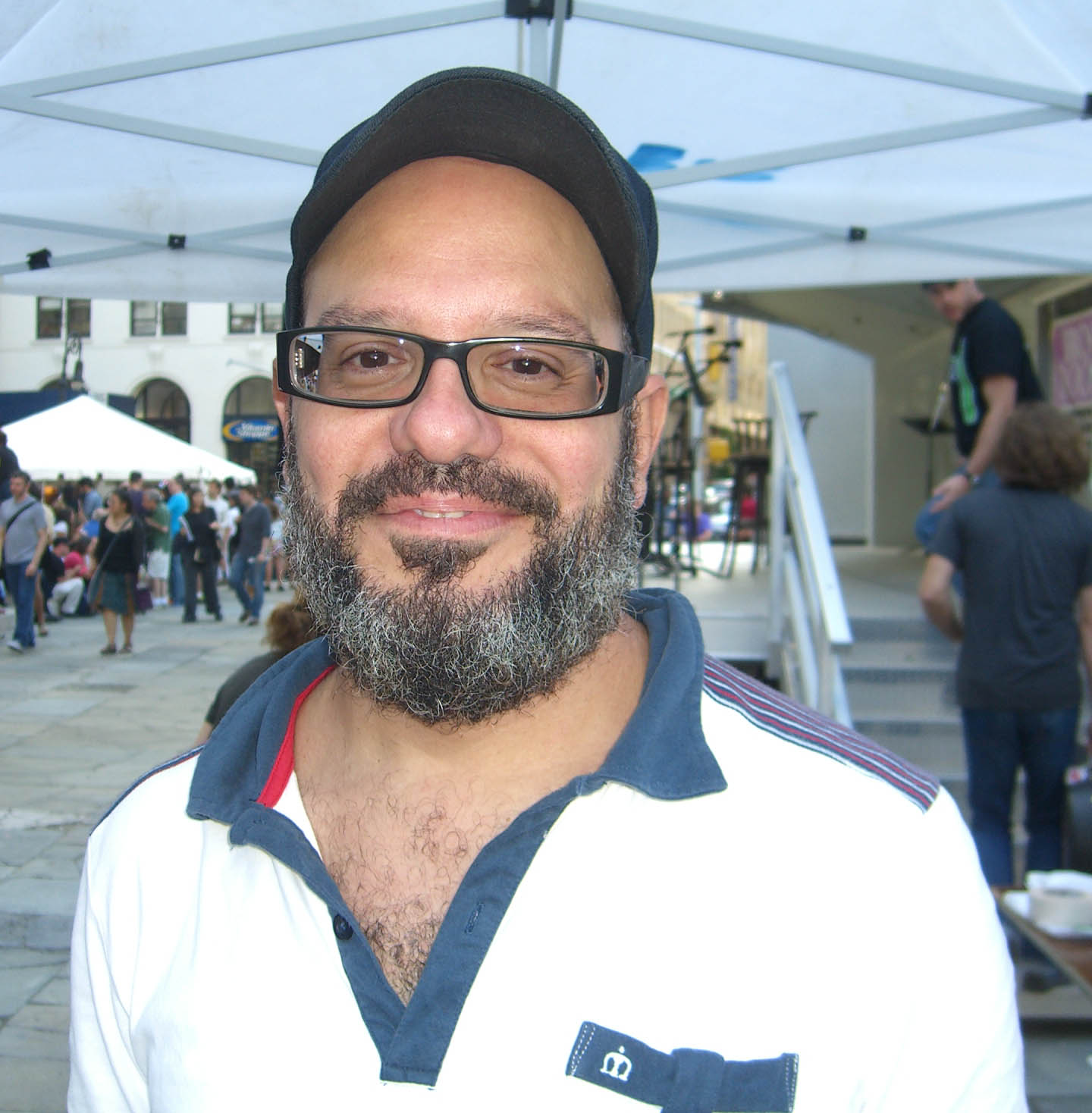
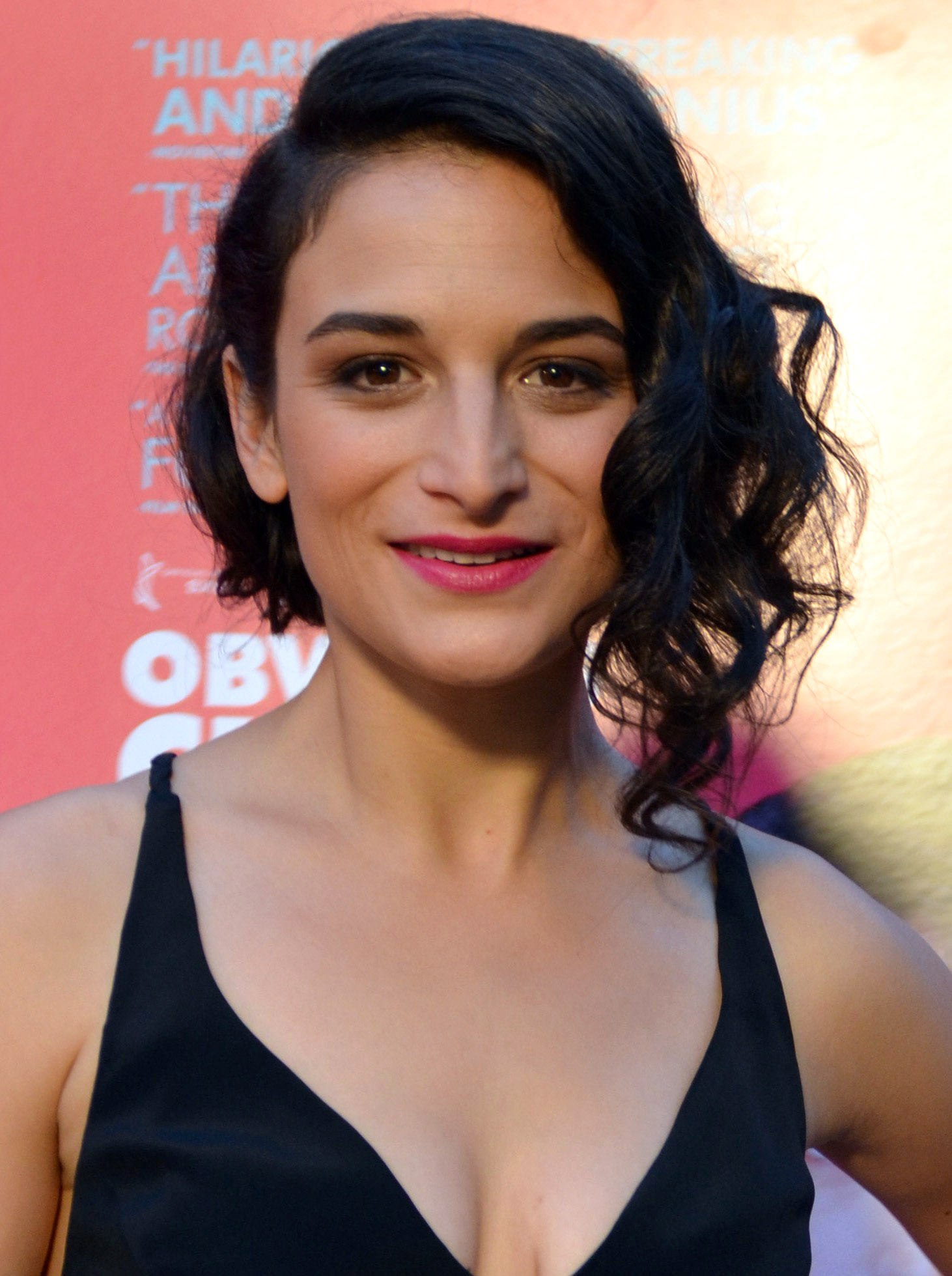
(L to R) Jason Lee (pictured in 2015), David Cross (2009), and Jenny Slate (2014)
- Jason Lee as David "Dave" Seville
- David Cross as Ian Hawke
- Jenny Slate as Zoe
- Justin Long as Alvin Seville (speaking voice)
  - Ross Bagdasarian Jr. as Alvin Seville (singing voice)
- Matthew Gray Gubler as Simon Seville (speaking voice)
  - Steve Vining as Simon Seville (singing voice)
- Jesse McCartney as Theodore Seville (speaking voice)
  - Janice Karman as Theodore Seville (singing voice)
- Christina Applegate as Brittany (speaking voice)
  - Janice Karman as Brittany (singing voice)
- Anna Faris as Jeanette (speaking voice)
  - Janice Karman as Jeanette (singing voice)
- Amy Poehler as Eleanor (speaking voice)
  - Janice Karman as Eleanor (singing voice)
- Alan Tudyk as Simone, Simon's adventurous French alter-ego after getting bitten by a spider that gives him amnesia.
- Frank Welker as Brittany, Jeanette and Eleanor (snarling voice)
- Luisa D'Oliveira as Tessa
- Andy Buckley as Captain Correlli
- Tucker Albrizzi as Kite Kid
- Phyllis Smith as Flight Attendant

== Production ==
On October 26, 2010, according to 24 Frames from the Los Angeles Times, Mike Mitchell, the director behind Shrek Forever After, was in negotiations with 20th Century Fox to direct the new film. Principal photography began on January 22, 2011. The film featured one of Carnival's newest and biggest cruise ships, Carnival Dream. The external shots and interior stateroom suite were filmed during a seven-day Caribbean cruise. The casino, dance club, and dining room were filmed on a set not attempting to match the actual interior of the Carnival Dream cruise ship. The visual effects and animation for the chipmunks were provided by Los Angeles-based Rhythm & Hues Studios (R&H), who previously animated the first and second installments of the franchise. Mark Mothersbaugh composed the musical score for the film, replacing David Newman.

== Release ==
Alvin and the Chipmunks: Chipwrecked was released in the United States on December 16, 2011. It is the first and only live-action/animated Chipmunks film to be rated G by the Motion Picture Association of America. It was originally planned to be released in 3D, which never came to fruition. The film was accompanied by a short film entitled Scrat's Continental Crack-up Part 2 to promote Ice Age: Continental Drift, which was released on July 13, 2012.

=== Home media ===
Alvin and the Chipmunks: Chipwrecked was released on DVD and Blu-ray from 20th Century Fox Home Entertainment on March 27, 2012. The release made $44,732,290 in DVD sales and $10,542,142 in Blu-ray sales.

== Marketing ==
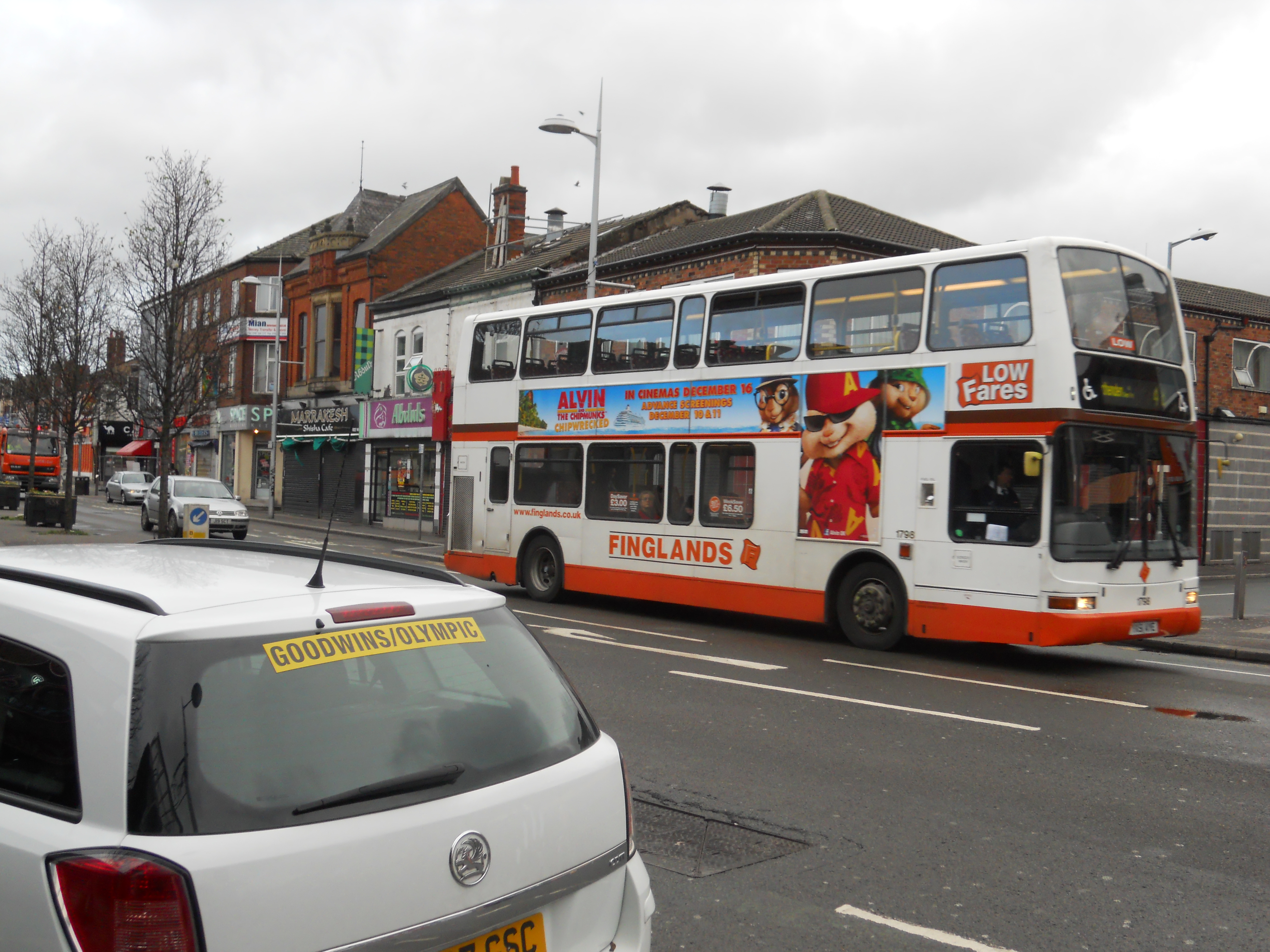
Bus promoting the film in England

=== Video game ===
Alvin and the Chipmunks: Chipwrecked
- Developer: Behaviour Interactive
- Publisher: Majesco
- Series: Alvin and the Chipmunks
- Platforms: DS, Wii, Xbox 360
- Release: NA: November 15, 2011; EU: November 25, 2011
- Genre: Rhythm
- Modes: Single-player, multiplayer

Alvin and the Chipmunks: Chipwrecked is a video game based on the film. It was released for the Wii, Nintendo DS, and Xbox 360 on November 15, 2011, in North America and on November 25, 2011, in Europe. Like the previous Alvin and the Chipmunks and Alvin and the Chipmunks: The Squeakquel video game adaptations, Ross Bagdasarian Jr. and Janice Karman reprised their respective roles.

== Reception ==
=== Box office ===
The film grossed a total of $133.1 million in North America, and $216 million overseas, for a worldwide total of $349.1 million. Alvin and the Chipmunks: Chipwrecked made $6.7 million on its opening day, which was lower than the opening day grosses of Alvin and the Chipmunks ($13.3 million) and Alvin and the Chipmunks: The Squeakquel ($18.8 million). For its opening weekend, the film ranked at the #2 spot behind Sherlock Holmes: A Game of Shadows with $23.2 million, which was less than the opening weekends of the franchise's previous two films, the original film's $44.3 million and its sequel's $48.9 million respectively.

=== Critical response ===
On the review aggregation website Rotten Tomatoes, 10% of 79 critics' reviews are positive, with an average rating of 3.6/10. The website's consensus reads: "Lazy, rote, and grating, Chipwrecked is lowest-common-denominator family entertainment that's strictly for the very, very, very young at heart." Metacritic, which uses a weighted average, assigned the film a score of 24 out of 100, based on 19 critics, indicating "generally unfavorable" reviews. Audiences polled by CinemaScore gave the film an average grade of "B+" on an A+ to F scale. This made it the lowest-rated live-action animated Chipmunks film on all three websites.

John Anderson of Variety wrote: "As impressive as the CG elements are in 'Chipwrecked,' they're a mixed blessing: The more lifelike the techies make the critters—Alvin (voiced by Justin Long), Theodore (Jesse McCartney) and Simon (Matthew Gray Gubler) —the more we're reminded they're rodents." Michael Rechtshaffen of The Hollywood Reporter called it "Every bit as frantic, frenetic, groan-inducing and all around grating as its two predecessors."

Cross described Chipwrecked as "literally without question, the most unpleasant experience I've ever had in my professional life." He accused an unidentified female producer of mistreating him. He was also "forced at legal gunpoint" to spend a week shooting footage on a Carnival Cruise, which Cross argued was unnecessary since he had no lines and was unrecognizable in a pelican suit. The comments cost Cross a $150,000 bonus for violating his non-disparagement clause by discussing his grievances publicly.

=== Accolades ===
- 2012 BMI Film & TV Awards: Film Music Award for Mark Mothersbaugh (winner)
- 2012 Kids' Choice Awards: Favorite Movie (winner)
- 2012 Teen Choice Awards: Choice Movie Voice for Jesse McCartney (nominated)

== Soundtrack ==
Alvin and the Chipmunks: Chipwrecked: Music from the Motion Picture is the licensed soundtrack based on the film. It was released on November 15, 2011, by Atlantic Records. Released to US Target stores, a limited-edition version of the soundtrack was released containing four exclusive bonus tracks. iTunes and Amazon.com released a deluxe edition available only on digital download containing three bonus tracks.

== Sequel ==
In June 2013, 20th Century Fox announced a sequel, Alvin and the Chipmunks: The Road Chip, which was released on December 18, 2015. On December 18, 2014, however, it was announced for a December 23, 2015 release. The cast reprised their roles for the film, excluding Poehler and Cross.
