= Club Chipmunk: The Dance Mixes =

Studio album by The Chipmunks
- Released: October 8, 1996
- Recorded: 1996
- Label: Sony, Columbia
- Producer: Ross Bagdasarian Jr., Guy Moon, Barry Coffing

The Chipmunks chronology
When You Wish Upon a Chipmunk (1995)	''Club Chipmunk: The Dance Mixes'' (1996)	The A-Files: Alien Songs (1998)

Professional ratings
Review scores
Source	Rating
AllMusic	2.5/5 stars

Club Chipmunk: The Dance Mixes is a music album by Alvin and the Chipmunks and was released by Sony Wonder. The album was released on October 6, 1996, and contains cover versions of popular pop/dance songs, and a Spanish version of "Macarena". The album peaked at #8 on Billboard's Top Kid Audio.

== Track listing ==
1. "Macarena" (Los del Río) - The Chipmunks and The Chipettes
2. "Vogue" (Madonna) - The Chipettes
3. "Stayin' Alive" (Bee Gees) - The Chipmunks
4. "Play That Funky Music" (Wild Cherry) - The Chipmunks
5. "I'm Too Sexy" (Right Said Fred) - Alvin
6. "Turn the Beat Around" (Vicki Sue Robinson, Gloria Estefan) - The Chipettes
7. "Witch Doctor" - The Chipmunks
8. "Shout" (The Isley Brothers) - The Chipmunks
9. "Love Shack" (The B-52's) - The Chipmunks and The Chipettes
10. "Macarena (Spanish Version)" - The Chipmunks and The Chipettes
