= The Bird on My Head =

"The Bird On My Head"

Single by Ross Bagdasarian
- B-side: "Hey There Moon"
- Released: June 19, 1958
- Recorded: March 12, 1958
- Genre: Novelty
- Length: 2:10
- Label: Liberty Records
- Songwriter: Ross Bagdasarian
- Producer: Ross Bagdasarian

Ross Bagdasarian singles chronology
"Witch Doctor" (1958)	"The Bird On My Head" (1958)	"The Chipmunk Song (Christmas Don't Be Late)" (1958)

"The Bird on My Head" is a 1958 novelty song by Ross Bagdasarian.

== Background ==
"The Bird on My Head" was the second charted novelty song to be recorded under the stage name "David Seville" (after six consecutive uncharted singles, starting with "Armen's Theme"), as well as the last song to be recorded before the creation of Alvin and the Chipmunks. Like Seville's first novelty song, "Witch Doctor", the song has a sped-up voice (albeit slightly slower than the one Seville used for "Witch Doctor"). Although both songs have the same sped-up voices, "The Bird on My Head" did not achieve the success of its predecessor, peaking at No. 34.

== Lyrics ==
The lyrics describe a man with a bird sitting on his head, sitting in a vacant lot. Throughout the song, the man and the bird sing together talking about where they belong and lamenting their current position — the man lacking a house and wife, and the bird not having a tree.

== Track listing ==
All songs composed by Ross Bagdasarian Sr.

1. "The Bird on My Head" (2:10)
2. "Hey There Moon" (2:05)
