= Greatest Hits: Still Squeaky After All These Years =

Greatest hits album by Alvin and the Chipmunks
- Released: September 21, 1999 (original); September 18, 2007 (re-issue)
- Recorded: 1958 – 1969
- Genre: Children's music
- Label: Capitol

Greatest Hits: Still Squeaky After All These Years is a 1999 music album by Alvin and the Chipmunks, released by Capitol Records, and containing 17 tracks, including the newly recorded bonus track "A Chat with Alvin". The album was remastered and re-issued in 2007 by Capitol Records, containing 26 tracks and omitting " A Chat with Alvin". The album's subtitle parodies Paul Simon's 1975 album Still Crazy After All These Years.

== Track listing ==
1. "Witch Doctor" (Chipmunk Version)
2. "Alvin's Orchestra"
3. "Japanese Banana"
4. "I Wish I Could Speak French"
5. "She Loves You"
6. "Alvin for President"
7. "I Wish I Had a Horse"
8. "Alvin's Harmonica"
9. "America the Beautiful"
10. "The Alvin Show Theme" (Opening)
11. "Chipmunk Fun"
12. "Please, Please Me"
13. "If You Love Me (Alouette)"
14. "Supercalifragilisticexpialidocious"
15. "The Chipmunk Song (Christmas Don't Be Late)"
16. "The Alvin Show Theme" (Closing)
17. Bonus Track: "A Chat with Alvin"

=== 2007 re-issue ===
1. "Witch Doctor" (Chipmunk Version)
2. "Alvin's Orchestra"
3. "Japanese Banana"
4. "I Wish I Could Speak French"
5. "She Loves You"
6. "Sing a Goofy Song"
7. "I Wish I Had a Horse"
8. "Alvin's Harmonica"
9. "America the Beautiful"
10. "The Alvin Show Theme" (Opening)
11. "Chipmunk Fun"
12. "Please, Please Me"
13. "If You Love Me (Alouette)"
14. "Supercalifragilisticexpialidocious"
15. "Can't Buy Me Love"
16. "I'm Henry the VIII, I Am"
17. "Ragtime Cowboy Joe"
18. "The Alvin Twist"
19. "Sing Again with the Chipmunks"
20. "Coming 'Round the Mountain"
21. "Do-Re-Mi"
22. "Whistle While You Work"
23. "Pop Goes the Weasel"
24. "Talk to the Animals"
25. "The Chipmunk Song (Christmas Don't Be Late)"
26. "The Alvin Show Theme" (Closing)
