= When You Wish Upon a Chipmunk =

Studio album by Alvin and the Chipmunks
- Released: October 31, 1995
- Recorded: 1995
- Genre: Children's; musical theatre
- Label: Sony Wonder; Chipmunk Records; Epic Records
- Producer: Ross Bagdasarian Jr.

Alvin and the Chipmunks chronology
| A Very Merry Chipmunk (1994) | When You Wish Upon a Chipmunk (1995) | Club Chipmunk: The Dance Mixes (1996) |

Professional ratings
Review scores
| Source | Rating |
|---|---|
| Allmusic | 2/5 stars |

When You Wish Upon a Chipmunk is a 1995 music album by Alvin and the Chipmunks, released by Sony Wonder, and contains 10 tracks.

The album features the Chipmunks and Chipettes singing Disney songs. A footnote on the back of the CD case stated that The Walt Disney Company neither sponsored nor endorsed the album. However, coincidentally, the home entertainment division Buena Vista Home Video (currently known as Walt Disney Studios Home Entertainment) had released several Chipmunks cartoons on home video in the early and mid-1990s.

== Track listing ==
1. "Hakuna Matata" (The Lion King) - The Chipmunks
2. "I've Got No Strings" (Pinocchio) - The Chipmunks and Chipettes
3. "Friend Like Me" (Aladdin) - The Chipmunks
4. "Kiss the Girl" (The Little Mermaid) - The Chipmunks and Chipettes
5. "Colors of the Wind" (Pocahontas) - The Chipettes
6. "Be Our Guest" (Beauty and the Beast) - The Chipmunks and Chipettes
7. "He's a Tramp" (Lady and the Tramp) - The Chipettes
8. "The Three Caballeros" (The Three Caballeros) - The Chipmunks
9. "Under the Sea" (The Little Mermaid) - The Chipmunks
10. "When You Wish Upon a Star" (Pinocchio) - The Chipmunks and Chipettes
