= Alvin and the Chipmunks: The Squeakquel =

2009 live action animated film by Betty Thomas

- Theatrical release poster
- Directed by: Betty Thomas
- Written by: Jon Vitti; Jonathan Aibel Glenn Berger
- Based on: Alvin and the Chipmunks by Ross Bagdasarian Sr.; The Chipettes by Janice Karman
- Produced by: Janice Karman; Ross Bagdasarian Jr.
- Starring: Zachary Levi; David Cross; Jason Lee; Justin Long; Matthew Gray Gubler; Jesse McCartney; Amy Poehler; Anna Faris; Christina Applegate; Wendie Malick; Anjelah Johnson; Kathryn Joosten; Kevin G. Schmidt; Chris Warren Jr.; Bridgit Mendler; Aimee Carrero; Brando Eaton; Alexandra Shipp; Jake Zyrus; Honor Society; Quest Crew
- Cinematography: Anthony B. Richmond
- Edited by: Matthew Friedman
- Music by: David Newman
- Production companies: Fox 2000 Pictures; Regency Enterprises; Bagdasarian Company; Dune Entertainment
- Distributed by: 20th Century Fox
- Release date: December 23, 2009
- Running time: 88 minutes
- Country: United States
- Language: English
- Budget: $70–75 million
- Box office: $443.5 million

Alvin and the Chipmunks: The Squeakquel is a 2009 American musical comedy film directed by Betty Thomas and written by Jon Vitti, Jonathan Aibel and Glenn Berger. Based on Alvin and the Chipmunks by Ross Bagdasarian Sr., and the fictional girl group The Chipettes by Janice Karman, it is the second installment in the live-action Alvin and the Chipmunks film series, following Alvin and the Chipmunks (2007). The film stars Zachary Levi, David Cross, Jason Lee, Wendie Malick, Anjelah Johnson, Kathryn Joosten, Kevin G. Schmidt, Chris Warren Jr., Bridgit Mendler, Aimee Carrero, Brando Eaton, Alexandra Shipp, Jake Zyrus, Honor Society and Quest Crew, with Justin Long, Matthew Gray Gubler and Jesse McCartney reprise their roles from the first film as the Chipmunks with newcomers Christina Applegate, Amy Poehler, Anna Faris, Eric Bauza and Sean Astin joining the voice cast as the Chipettes, Digger and Meerkat Manor Narrator. The film sees the Chipmunks entering high school under the care of Dave Seville's cousin, Toby. Meanwhile, Ian Hawke recruits the Chipettes to restore his career.

Alvin and the Chipmunks: The Squeakquel was released in the United States on December 23, 2009 by 20th Century Fox and grossed $443.5 million against its $70–75 million budget, despite receiving mixed to negative reviews from critics. The film was followed by two sequels, Chipwrecked in 2011, and The Road Chip in 2015.

== Plot ==
Two years after the events of the first film, Dave Seville is injured when a cardboard cutout of Alvin sends him flying across a stage during a charity benefit concert in Paris. While he recovers in a hospital, Dave asks his aunt, Jackie, to look after Alvin, Simon, and Theodore. Arrangements are also made for them to attend West Eastman High School. After Jackie falls down the staircase in her wheelchair and also has to be hospitalized, the Chipmunks are left in the care of Toby, Jackie's grandson and Dave's cousin.

Ex-JETT Records chief executive Ian Hawke, who is broke and destitute after losing the Chipmunks, lives in the company's basement. Three singing female chipmunks, Brittany, Jeanette, and Eleanor (the Chipettes), emerge from a FedEx package. They meet Ian and tell him they mailed themselves there because they want to work with the man who made the Chipmunks famous. Seeing how well they can sing, he signs them up in order to resurrect his career. He also lies to the girls by telling them that the Chipmunks completely disrespected him and left him the first chance they got.

While at school, two bullies attack the Chipmunks. The group is summoned to the principal's office after attacking and defeating the bullies. The principal and a fan of them, Dr. Rubin, enlists their help to raise money for the school's music program by participating in a contest. A shocked Ian finds that the Chipmunks will represent the school; he also enrolls the Chipettes there.

When the Chipmunks meet the Chipettes, both groups are smitten with each other, but the girls recall that Ian said they are untrustworthy, and the boys struggle to make it through a rehearsal because of their new crushes. Ian smugly walks in and introduces his new stars, the Chipettes, shocking the Chipmunks to see them working with him. A rivalry emerges when Ian convinces Dr. Rubin to let the Chipettes compete in the competition, and set up a concert for the two groups to compete to represent the school. Alvin becomes popular with the jocks and joins the football team, inadvertently missing the concert.

At the concert, Theodore and Simon withdraw, so the Chipettes win by default. Arriving to an empty auditorium, Alvin is called out by Brittany for his lack of responsibility. Alvin returns home and unsuccessfully tries apologizing to his brothers. Theodore runs away to the Los Angeles Zoo the next day to live with a meerkat family, but finds a wedge-tailed eagle living in their former exhibit. Alvin and Simon save him from the eagle, and the three reconcile.

The Chipettes learn that they are to perform as an opening act for a Britney Spears concert on the same night as the school contest. Ian convinces them to call off the battle and perform at the concert but refuses to give the same credit to Jeanette and Eleanor that he gives Brittany, who demands that they all perform together or not at all. Ian threatens to send them to a barbecue restaurant unless they perform.

Before the school contest, Alvin receives a distressed phone call from the Chipettes, who inform him that Ian has locked them in a cage. He goes on to rescue them on his toy motorcycle while Simon tells Jeanette how to pick the lock over the phone. Simon and Theodore are on the verge of performing by themselves until the others arrive in the remote-control toy helicopter that Ian uses to chase them. The Chipmunks and the Chipettes perform together for the first time and win the money for the music program. Ian is negatively received at the Staples Center concert.

Dave, who had left the hospital upon learning that Toby was looking after the Chipmunks, returns during the contest, happy to see the Chipmunks again, and allows the Chipettes to stay with them, only for him to slip, trip, and fall over after tucking them into bed.

== Cast ==
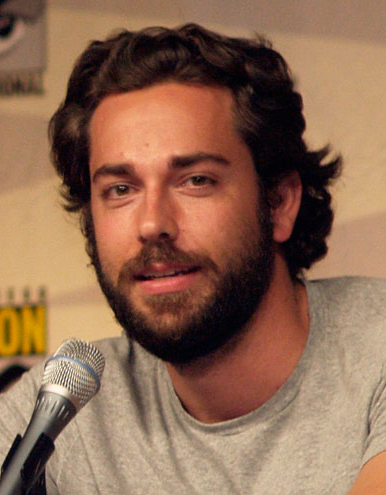
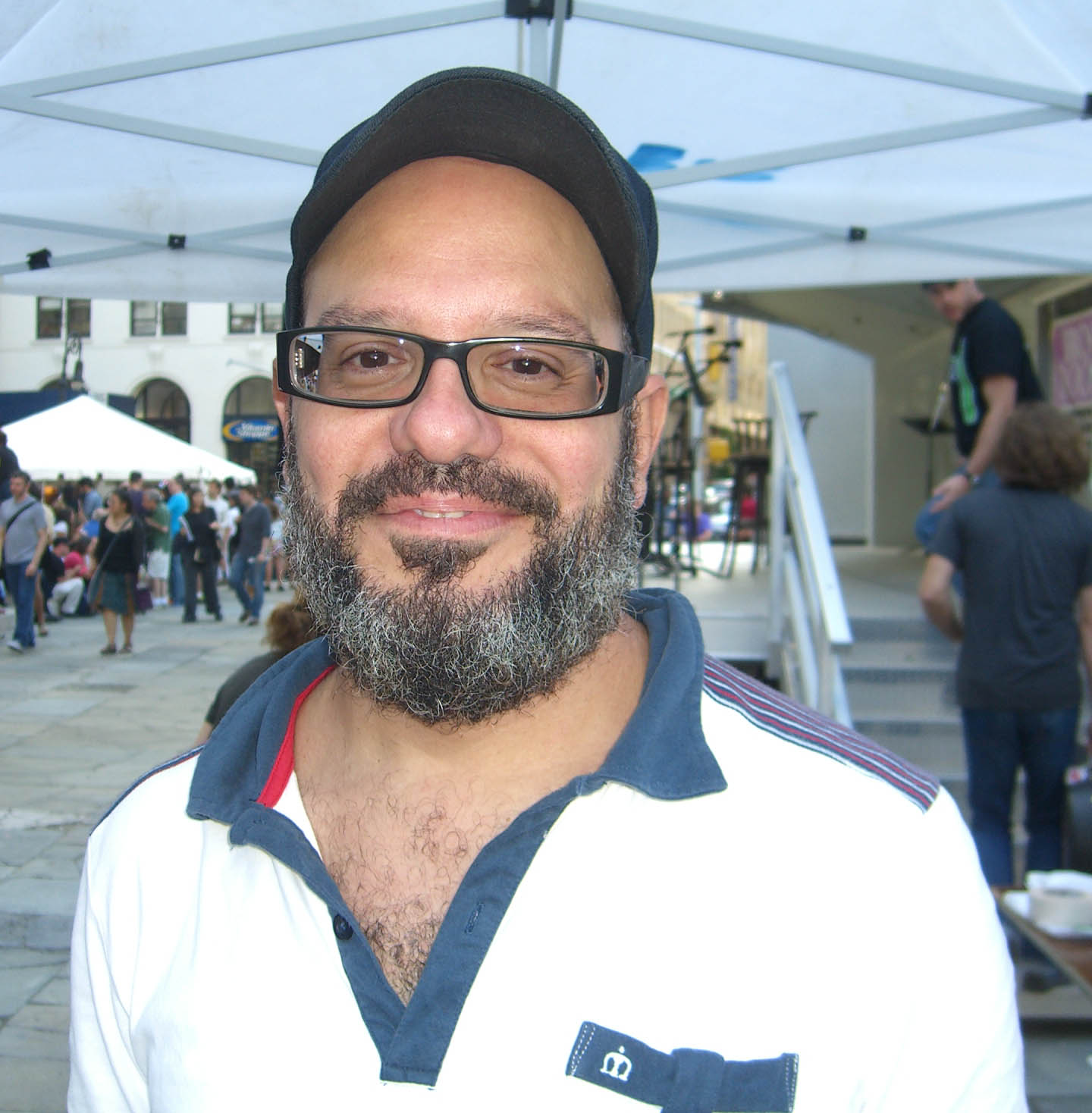
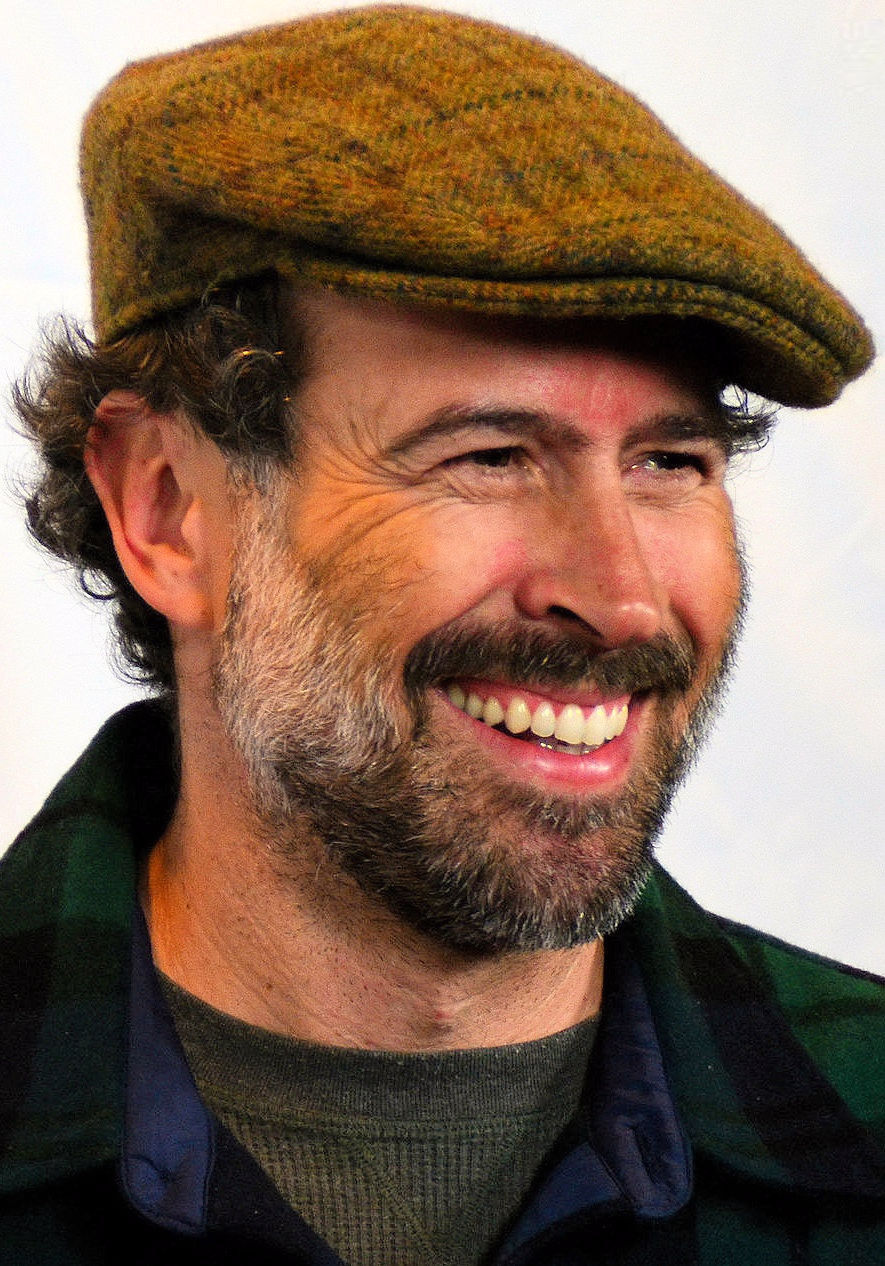
(L to R) Zachary Levi (2009), David Cross (2009), and Jason Lee (pictured in 2015)
- Justin Long as Alvin Seville (speaking voice)
  - Ross Bagdasarian Jr. as Alvin Seville (singing voice)
- Matthew Gray Gubler as Simon Seville (speaking voice)
  - Steve Vining as Simon Seville (singing voice)
- Jesse McCartney as Theodore Seville (speaking voice)
  - Janice Karman as Theodore Seville (singing voice)
- Christina Applegate as Brittany Miller (speaking voice)
  - Janice Karman as Brittany (singing voice)
- Anna Faris as Jeanette Miller (speaking voice)
  - Janice Karman as Jeanette (singing voice)
- Amy Poehler as Eleanor Miller (speaking voice)
  - Janice Karman as Eleanor (singing voice)
- Zachary Levi as Toby Seville
- David Cross as Ian Hawke
- Wendie Malick as Dr. Rubin
- Anjelah Johnson as Julie Ortega
- Kevin G. Schmidt as Ryan Edwards
- Jason Lee as David "Dave" Seville
- Kathryn Joosten as Aunt Jackie Seville
- Chris Warren Jr. as Xander
- Bridgit Mendler as Becca Kingston
- Alexandra Shipp as Valentina
- Aimee Carrero as Emily
- Brando Eaton as Jeremy Smith
- Jake Zyrus as himself (Note: Credited under Charice Pempengco as herself)
- Honor Society as themselves
- Quest Crew as Li'l Rosero Dancers
- Eric Bauza as Digger (voice)
- Sean Astin as Meerkat Manor Narrator (voice)

== Production ==
During the pre-production of Alvin and the Chipmunks: The Squeakquel in 2009, most of Dave's scenes were rewritten, with much of Lee's role being replaced with Levi's role, Toby Seville. The visual effects and animation for the chipmunks were produced by Los Angeles-based Rhythm & Hues Studios (R&H). David Newman, best known for composing the fanfare of 20th Century Fox, which debuted in Anastasia), composed the film's score, replacing Christopher Lennertz.

In one scene, Ian interacts with a rat in a basement, culminating in the rat stealing a muffin before leaving. The scene was carefully staged in a controlled environment. The rat, guided by trainers, followed specific cues to stay on its mark, take the muffin (a prop), and exit the scene. A prop radio was used during the sequence, ensuring the rat's safety. An additional scene involving costumed rats, monitored by American Humane, was excluded from the theatrical release.

Several dog scenes were filmed under controlled conditions with trainers overseeing the animals' actions. A dog barks at and topples a fake TV prop inside a constructed igloo set. Trainers used cues and a lightweight prop rigged with a string to safely execute the sequence. In an elevator scene, a Chihuahua briefly interacts with actors exiting an elevator. Trainers handed the leashed dog to the actors right before filming. The actors and dog had been well-rehearsed for the action and the dog was unfazed by either the mild noise the elevator made or the actor walking by with stuffed chipmunks on his shoulder (which were changed to computer-animated chipmunks in post-production). Trainers then cued the dog to "stare". A cat hisses and swats while appearing to react to a character's presence. This scene was filmed separately from the actor. Trainers used safety measures, including a waist tie and bait stick, to guide the cat's movements. An eagle appears in a scene interacting with the chipmunks. Filming took place under strict safety protocols, with the bird equipped with a monofilament line and guided by trainers. The eagle's actions, including flying and hopping, were directed using food rewards and bait sticks. The scene where a chipmunk seemingly kicks the eagle was created entirely with computer-generated imagery (CGI).

== Music ==
Alvin and the Chipmunks: The Squeakquel: Original Motion Picture Soundtrack is the soundtrack based on the film. It was released on December 1, 2009. Bands Honor Society and Queensberry, along with Filipino singer Charice, were all featured artists for both the movie and soundtrack.

== Release ==
=== Theatrical ===
Alvin and the Chipmunks: The Squeakquel was released in the United States on December 23, 2009 by 20th Century Fox.

=== Home media ===
Alvin and the Chipmunks: The Squeakquel was released on Blu-ray, DVD, and digital copy on March 30, 2010.

=== Marketing ===
A video game based on the film was released on December 1, 2009 (the same day as the movie's soundtrack) for the Wii and Nintendo DS.

== Reception ==
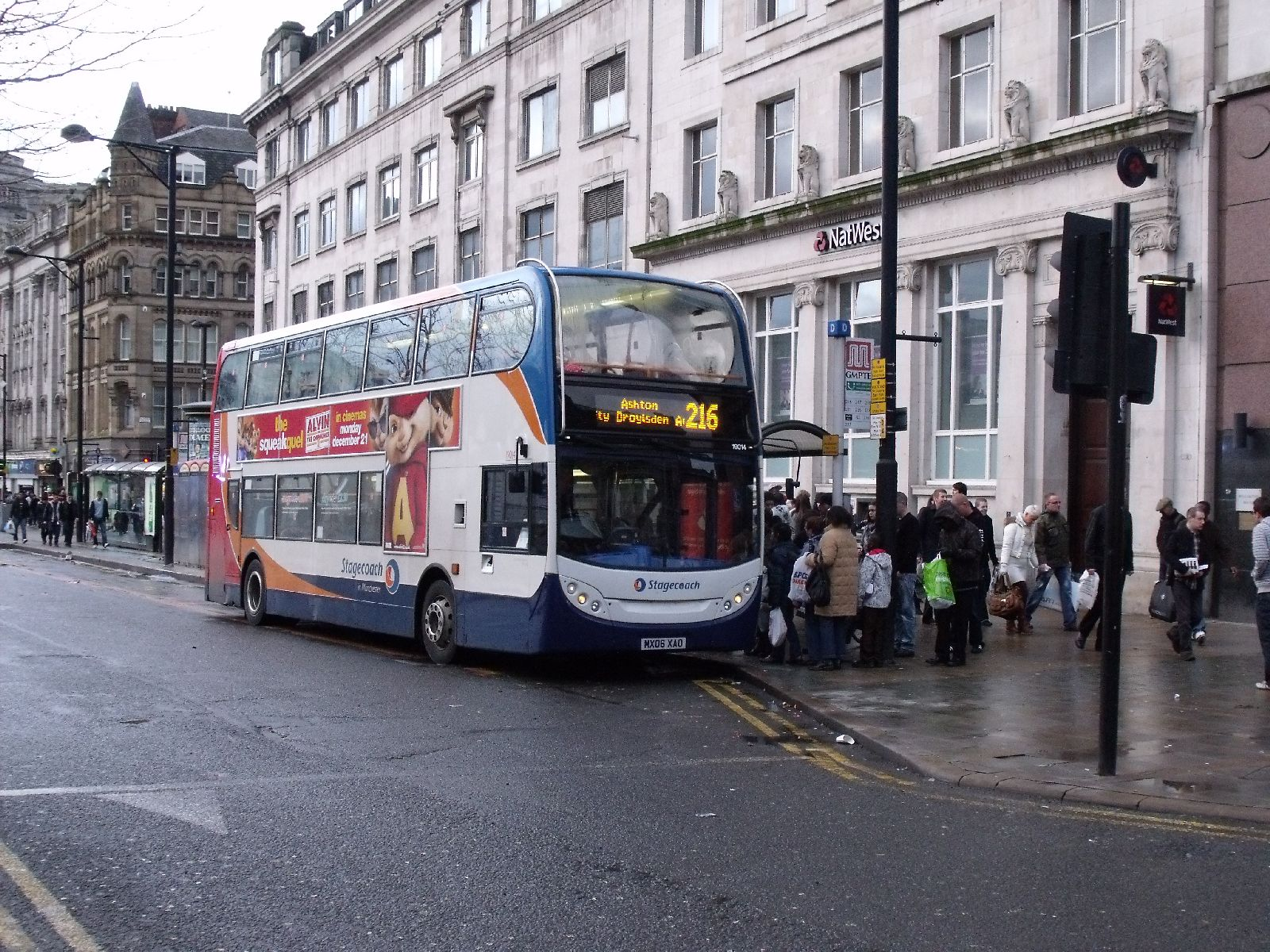
A bus promoting the film in Manchester

=== Box office ===
On its opening Wednesday, the film opened to #1 with $18.8 million and finished the weekend at #3 behind Fox's own Avatar and Warner Bros' Sherlock Holmes with $48.9 million and a $75.6 million 5-day total, eclipsing its budget in only 5 days. In the US, it was the 9th highest-grossing film of 2009, and on March 7, 2010, it out-grossed its predecessor to become the second highest-grossing film to never hit #1 behind My Big Fat Greek Wedding. It remains the highest grossing film to never crack the top two at the box office. The Squeakquel ended its theatrical run with $219.6 million in North America, and $223.9 million overseas, for a worldwide total of $443.5 million. It was produced on a budget of $70–75 million.

=== Critical response ===
On the review aggregator website Rotten Tomatoes, 21% of 84 critics' reviews are positive, with an average rating of 4/10. The website's consensus reads: "This Squeakquel may entertain the kiddies, but it's low on energy and heavily reliant on slapstick humor." Metacritic, which uses a weighted average, assigned the film a score of 41 out of 100, based on 20 critics, indicating "mixed or average" reviews. This made it the highest-rated live-action animated Chipmunks film on Metacritic. Audiences polled by CinemaScore gave the film an average grade of "A" on an A+ to F scale.

Owen Gleiberman of Entertainment Weekly graded the film a C-, asking, "Will kids eat up this cutely fractious claptrap? Of course they will. They'll eat up whatever you put in front of them. But that doesn't make The Squeakquel good for them." Sue Robinson from Radio Times said that "even if there's little here for older viewers to enjoy, youngsters will love the slapstick action and catchy soundtrack."

Joe Leydon, writing for Variety, called it "a frenetic but undeniably funny follow-up that offers twice the number of singing-and-dancing rodents in another seamless blend of CGI and live-action elements." Betsy Sharkey of the Los Angeles Times commented on Betty Thomas' direction, saying that she brings "a light campy touch as she did in 1995's The Brady Bunch Movie."

After the film had garnered $112 million worldwide at the box office over its first weekend, some critics were disappointed that it was more popular than other movies in wide release aimed at a family audience. Richard Corliss of Time wrote that families "could have taken the cherubs to The Princess and the Frog or Disney's A Christmas Carol, worthy efforts that, together, took in only about a fifth of the Chipmunks' revenue in the same period".

=== Accolades ===
At the 2010 Kids' Choice Awards, Alvin and the Chipmunks: The Squeakquel won Favorite Movie. The film was one of the nominees for the "Family" category at the 2010 National Movie Awards, losing to Harry Potter and the Half-Blood Prince (2009). Music supervisor Julianne Jordan won the Guild of Music Supervisors Award for Best Music Supervision for a Film in 2011. (Note: Also for Valentine's Day (2010), Red (2010), Fair Game (2010), Cats & Dogs: The Revenge of Kitty Galore (2010), and The Bounty Hunter (2010)) At the 2010 British Academy Children's Awards, The Squeakquel won Kid's Vote — Film.

== Sequels ==
Shortly after the film's release on DVD and Blu-ray, Fox and Regency had announced that Alvin and the Chipmunks 3D was scheduled to be released on December 16, 2011. The title was changed to Alvin and the Chipmunks: Chipwrecked. On January 22, 2011, Fox 2000 Pictures started production on the film during a Caribbean cruise on the Carnival Dream ship. Filming took place primarily on the ship's upper, open decks with scenes featuring actor Jason Lee (reprising his role) and the antics of The Chipmunks in the Carnival Dream's outdoor recreation areas. Stops on the itinerary included Cozumel, Roatan, Belize, and Costa Maya (which provided tropical backdrops for many of the film's shipboard scenes). A fourth film, Alvin and the Chipmunks: The Road Chip, was released on December 18, 2015.
