= Chipmunks in Low Places =

Chipmunks In Low Places

Studio album by Alvin and the Chipmunks
- Released: September 29, 1992 (US)
- Recorded: August 1992
- Genre: Children's; country
- Length: 42:20
- Label: Chipmunk/Sony Kids' Music (US), Columbia (International)
- Producer: John Boylan; Janice Karman; Ross Bagdasarian

Alvin and the Chipmunks chronology
| The Chipmunks Rock the House (1991) | Chipmunks In Low Places (1992) | Greatest Hits (1992) |

Professional ratings
Review scores
| Source | Rating |
|---|---|
| AllMusic | 2/5 stars |
| The Miami Herald | (unfavorable) |
| The Kansas City Star | (mixed) |
| The Buffalo News | (unfavorable) |
| The Cincinnati Post | 3/5 stars |
| Record-Journal | (mixed) |
| The Commercial Appeal | (favorable) |
| The Fresno Bee | (unfavorable) |
| The Philadelphia Inquirer | 2/4 stars |
| The Cincinnati Enquirer | 4/5 stars |
| The Palm Beach Post | (favorable) |
| Associated Press | (favorable) |

Chipmunks in Low Places is a country album written by John Boylan and Andrew Gold and performed by Alvin and the Chipmunks. It features cover songs as well as original material. Released on September 29, 1992, the album was certified Platinum by the RIAA, becoming the group's first platinum record and making it the Chipmunks' best-selling album. The album reached number 21 on the Billboard 200, becoming their first album to chart in ten years. The album also managed to peak at No. 6 on Billboard's Top Country Albums, making it the highest peaking album for the group on the chart. In Canada, the album peaked at number 9, and was number 49 in the Top 50 Country albums of 1993.

== Storyline ==
Alvin is feeling down about life in general so he tries to lift his spirits to his favorite country songs [track 1]. He brings in his favorite singers to sing with him in his latest album, but every duet ends with an argument [tracks 2–3]. His girlfriend Brittany is in the final process of breaking up with him [tracks 4 and 10]. Coming home to a dirty room, he is so depressed after seeing his guests imitate his mischief that he loses touch with reality and sinks into fairy tale addiction [track 5], refusing to clean his room in the process. At Charlie Daniels's urging, he starts to be nice to his brothers, but the conversation between them results in the unloading of a lot of unpleasant memories [track 6]. Following a concert mishap in Nashville where he cannot resist destroying his and his brothers' instruments [tracks 7–8], he tries to hook up with Waylon Jennings, but Mr. Jennings turns down his overtures and badmouths his natural behavior [track 9]. Having scared everyone else away, he utters one final, futile act of self-indignation [track 11].

== Track listing ==
Chipmunks in Low Places track listing
| No. | Title | Writer(s) | Length |
|---|---|---|---|
| 1. | "Country Pride" | Paul Peterson, John Boylan | 3:23 |
| 2. | "Achy Breaky Heart" (featuring Billy Ray Cyrus) | Don Von Tress | 4:49 |
| 3. | "There Ain't Nothin' Wrong with the Radio" (featuring Aaron Tippin) | Aaron Tippin, Buddy Brock | 4:17 |
| 4. | "Stand by Your Man" (featuring Tammy Wynette) | Tammy Wynette, Billy Sherrill | 4:46 |
| 5. | "Gotta Believe in Pumpkins" | Ross Bagdasarian, Andrew Gold | 3:13 |
| 6. | "Brothers and Old Boots" (featuring Charlie Daniels) | Bagdasarian, Janice Karman, Boylan | 4:27 |
| 7. | "Don’t Rock the Jukebox" (featuring Alan Jackson) | Alan Jackson, Roger Murrah, Keith Stegall | 3:44 |
| 8. | "Down at the Twist and Shout" | Mary Chapin Carpenter | 3:28 |
| 9. | "Outlaws" (featuring Waylon Jennings) | Waylon Jennings | 3:51 |
| 10. | "I Feel Lucky" | Carpenter, Don Schlitz | 3:09 |
| 11. | "I Ain't No Dang Cartoon" | Bagdasarian, Karman, Gold | 3:06 |

Source: allmusic

== Personnel ==
Musicians and vocalists

- Alvin Seville – lead and backing vocals
- Simon Seville – lead and backing vocals
- Theodore Seville – lead and backing vocals
- B. James Lowry – guitar
- Roy Huskey, Jr. – bass guitar
- Eddie Bayers – drums
- Steve Nathan – keyboards
- Owen Hale – percussion
- Buddy Emmons – steel guitar
- Rob Hajacos – fiddle
- Andrew Gold – keyboards, guitars, and backing vocals
- John Boylan – keyboards and guitars
- Billy Burnette – guitar and backing vocals
- Rainy Haynes – backing vocals
- Sherwood Ball – backing vocals
- Gerry Beckley – backing vocals

Production credits

- John Boylan – producer
- Janice Karman – producer
- Ross Bagdasarian – producer
- Warren Peterson – engineer (Nashville unit)
- Greg Parker – assistant engineer (Nashville unit)
- Traci Sterling – production coordinator (Nashville unit)
- Paul Grupp – engineer (Los Angeles unit)
- Richard Markowitz – assistant engineer (Los Angeles unit)
- Denice Ferguson – production coordinator (Los Angeles unit)
- Teri Wegel – production coordinator (Los Angeles unit)
- Steve "Boots" Karman – art direction
- Tony Le Bruno – cover photo
- Sandra – cover animation art
- Kim Ellis – cover animation art
- Brian Mendelsohn – digital recording/editing

== Charts ==
Chart performance for Chipmunks in Low Places
| Chart (1992) | Peak position |
|---|---|
| Canadian RPM Country Albums | 9 |
| US Billboard 200 | 21 |
| US Billboard Top Country Albums | 6 |
