= Alvin and the Chipmunks =

Virtual band and media franchise

- Official logo

Background information
- Origin: California, United States
- Genres: Pop; children's; Christmas
- Years active: 1958-1972, 1980-present
- Labels: Liberty; Chipmunk; Capitol; Rhino; Sony; Columbia
- Spinoffs: The Chipettes
- Members: Alvin Seville; Simon Seville; Theodore Seville
- Website: alvinandthechipmunks.com

Alvin and the Chipmunks, originally known as David Seville and the Chipmunks and billed for their first two decades as the Chipmunks, are an American animated virtual band and media franchise first created by Ross Bagdasarian for novelty records in 1958. The group consists of three singing animated anthropomorphic chipmunk brothers named Alvin, Simon, and Theodore. The characters have since featured in several television series and films, as well as other media.

Bagdasarian provided the group's voices by producing sped-up recordings of his own, a technique pioneered on the successful "Witch Doctor". Later in 1958, Bagdasarian released the similarly engineered "The Chipmunk Song (Christmas Don't Be Late)" for which he came up with the chipmunk characters and their human father, attributing the track to them. The Chipmunks were first depicted in animated form in The Alvin Show (1961). David Seville and the Chipmunks released several more records over the following decade until Bagdasarian's death in 1972. The franchise was revived in 1973, with the characters' voices provided by his son Ross Bagdasarian Jr. and the latter's wife Janice Karman.

Through the successful franchise, the Chipmunks have become one of the most successful children's artists of all time. It has garnered two number-one singles on the Billboard Hot 100 and won five Grammy Awards, having four Top 10 albums on the Billboard 200 and three certified platinum albums. "The Chipmunk Song" became one of the best-selling singles of all time at 5 million physical copies sold. In 2019, The Chipmunks received a star on the Hollywood Walk of Fame.

== History ==
=== "Witch Doctor" ===
In 1958, Ross Bagdasarian Sr. released a novelty song (as David Seville) about being unsuccessful at love until he found a witch doctor who told him how to woo his woman. Seville had bought a tape recorder and he experimented recording himself at different speeds to create a duet between him and the witch doctor. The voice of the witch doctor was in fact Seville's own voice, sung slowly but recorded at half speed on the tape recorder, then played back at normal speed, thereby speeding up the voice into a high-pitched squeaky one. The name for the high speed voices came from Bagdasarian's children Carol, Ross Jr., and Adam who remarked that the sped up voices sounded like chipmunks which led to Bagdasarian setting on them as the characters and names after previously considering rabbits or butterflies.

The song was a hit, holding number one for three weeks in the Billboard Hot 100 chart, ranked by Billboard as the No. 4 song for 1958. Bagdasarian re-recorded the song for the second Chipmunks album, Sing Again with the Chipmunks, in 1960.

Bagdasarian (again as Seville) recorded a follow-up song, "The Bird on My Head", singing a duet with his own sped-up voice as the bird. It also reached the Top 40, peaking at No. 34. While driving in Sequoia National Park, Bagdasarian saw a chipmunk dash in front of him. That moment inspired him to create his chipmunk characters. He again used the same technique to pitch up the voice to create the chipmunks.

=== "The Chipmunk Song" ===
After the success of "Witch Doctor", Liberty Records asked Bagdasarian to create another successful novelty record. He then came up with three singing chipmunks who were named after executives at Liberty Records: Alvin (named after Al Bennett), Simon (named after Simon Waronker), and Theodore (Ted Keep). The Chipmunks first officially appeared in a novelty record released in late fall 1958 by Bagdasarian. The song, originally listed on the record label (Liberty F-55168) as "The Chipmunk Song (Christmas Don't Be Late)", featured the singing skills of the chipmunk trio. The novelty record was highly successful, selling 4.5 million copies in seven weeks, eventually selling 12 million copies. The song launched the careers of its chipmunk stars. The song won three Grammy Awards in 1958 and was nominated for Record of the Year. "The Chipmunk Song" appeared on the Chipmunks' debut album, Let's All Sing with the Chipmunks, in 1959, and was repeated on Christmas with the Chipmunks, released in 1962.

=== The Alvin Show (1961–1962) ===
The first television series to feature the characters was The Alvin Show. The series ran from 1961 to 1962 and was one of a small number of animated series to be shown in prime time on CBS. It was not a prime-time ratings success and was subsequently canceled after one season. Ratings improved significantly in syndication. The television series was produced by Format Films for Bagdasarian Film Corporation. Although the series was broadcast in black and white, it was produced and later re-run in color. This show also introduced David Seville as an animated caricature.

=== New albums and A Chipmunk Christmas (1969–1982) ===
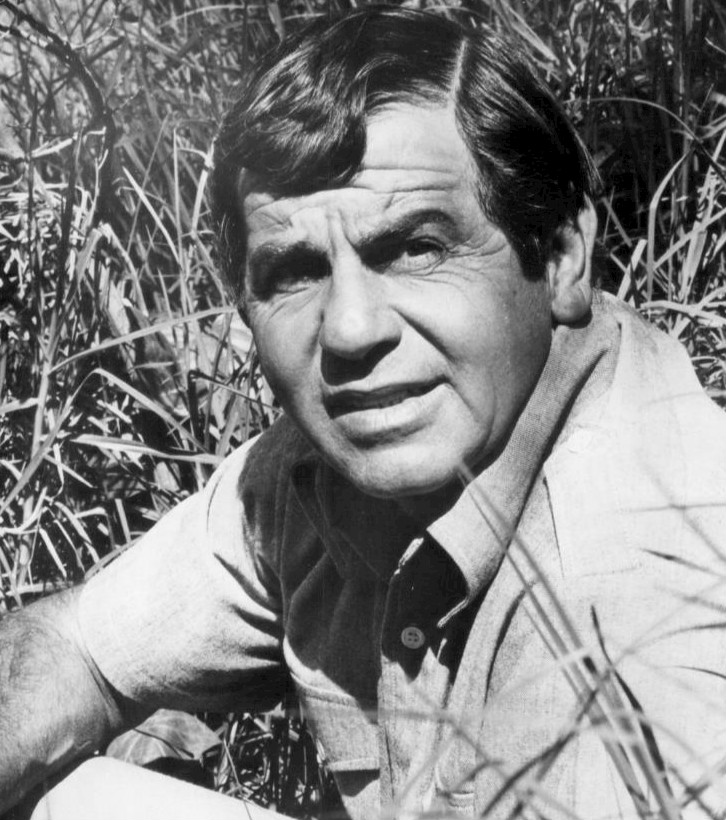
Ross Bagdasarian in 1972. He was the creator of the Chipmunks.

The final Chipmunks album in the project's original incarnation, The Chipmunks Go to the Movies, was released in 1969. Following the death of Ross Bagdasarian in 1972, his son Ross Bagdasarian Jr. took over the family business concerns focusing mostly on the real estate and vineyard holdings as the Alvin and the Chipmunks was mostly ignored. In 1977, Bagdasarian rediscovered his father's creation and attempted to pitch a revival of The Chipmunks to television networks and record labels but there was no enthusiasm from executives. In 1979, then NBC President Fred Silverman was instrumental in acquiring the rights to rerun The Alvin Show for the 1979–80 Saturday morning television season where it performed adequately. The following year, Excelsior Records released a new album of contemporary songs performed by the Chipmunks. That album, Chipmunk Punk, featured Bagdasarian's son, Ross Bagdasarian Jr., doing the voices of the characters. That album and the continued reruns of the series proved to be popular enough to warrant further new records as well as new television productions. Further, on December 14, 1981, the Chipmunks and Seville returned to television in the NBC Christmas special A Chipmunk Christmas, produced by the Bagdasarians with Chuck Jones as a creative consultant. It was accompanied by a soundtrack album. The following year, two more albums were released (Chipmunk Rock and The Chipmunks Go Hollywood).

=== Alvin and the Chipmunks (1983–1990) ===
The group's name changed from "the Chipmunks" to "Alvin and the Chipmunks". In 1983, a second animated television series for the group, titled Alvin and the Chipmunks, was produced by Ruby-Spears Productions and released. The first season introduced The Chipettes (three female versions of the Chipmunks). The show's success led to the release of a soundtrack album in 1984, Songs from Our TV Shows. After 1988, the show was renamed just the Chipmunks. In 1985, the Chipmunks, along with the Chipettes, were featured in the live stage show, Alvin and the Chipmunks and the Amazing Computer. In 1987, during the fifth season of the television show, the Chipmunks had their first animated feature film, The Chipmunk Adventure, directed by Janice Karman and Ross Bagdasarian Jr. and released in theaters by The Samuel Goldwyn Company.

In the 1988–89 season, the show switched production companies to DIC Entertainment (1988–1990) and Murakami Wolf Swenson (1988). In 1990, the show switched titles again to The Chipmunks Go to the Movies. In 1990, a documentary was produced about the show entitled Alvin and the Chipmunks/Five Decades with the Chipmunks. In that year, the Chipmunks teamed up with other famous cartoon stars for the drug abuse-prevention special Cartoon All-Stars to the Rescue.

=== Music releases and Universal acquisition (1990–2002) ===
On December 9, 1990, NBC aired a television special starring the Chipmunks entitled Rockin' Through the Decades. The same year, the band released the album The Chipmunks Rock the House. In 1992, the group released the country album Chipmunks in Low Places. Released on September 29, 1992, the album was certified platinum by the RIAA, becoming the group's first platinum record and making it the Chipmunks' best-selling album followed by a greatest hits release and a reissue of 1981's A Chipmunk Christmas. By 1993, Urban Chipmunk was re-released as a compilation album The Chipmunks' 35th Birthday Party with a double album, called The Chipmunks Sing-Alongs. Their fourth Christmas album, A Very Merry Chipmunk, saw a release in 1994, then When You Wish Upon a Chipmunk in 1995, and Club Chipmunk: The Dance Mixes in 1996 which peaked in the Top 10 on Billboard's Top Kid Audio.

In 1996, Universal Studios purchased the rights to the characters. In 1998, Sony Wonder and Columbia Records released The A-Files: Alien Songs and Greatest Hits: Still Squeaky After All These Years on September 21, 1999. The purchase of the rights to the characters by Universal resulted in the Chipmunks' 1999 reappearance, in the form of the direct-to-video movie Alvin and the Chipmunks Meet Frankenstein, released on September 28, 1999. Five new songs were composed for the film and were made available via a soundtrack released by MCA Records. Later that year, The Chipmunks' Greatest Christmas Hits was released. The movie was successful enough to spark interest in a sequel, and in 2000, Alvin and the Chipmunks Meet the Wolfman appeared. Three new songs were composed for the film, that were also made available on a soundtrack by MCA. Both movies featured the original cast of the second series reprising their roles as the tone was very similar to the series. Universal lost the rights to the characters in 2002 due to a breach of contract with Bagdasarian Productions.

=== Return to independency, movies and merchandise (2003–present) ===
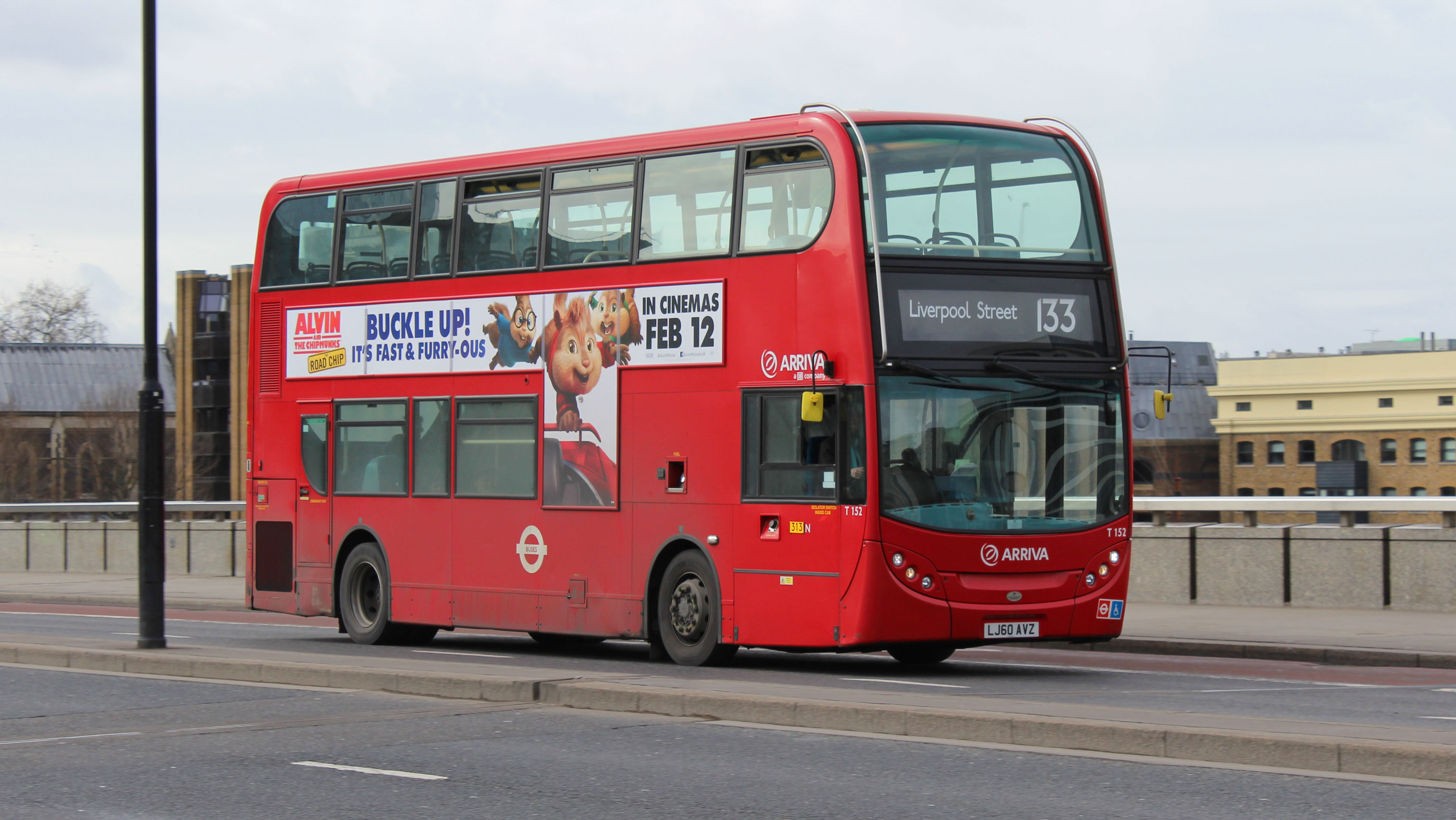
Bus promoting Alvin and the Chipmunks: The Road Chip in London

On September 17, 2004, Fox 2000 Pictures, Regency Enterprises, and Bagdasarian Productions announced a live-action animated film starring Alvin and the Chipmunks. Tim Hill directed the 2007 adaptation Alvin and the Chipmunks, with voices by Justin Long, Matthew Gray Gubler, and Jesse McCartney. Further live-action installments were The Squeakquel (2009), Chipwrecked (2011), and The Road Chip (2015). Despite mostly negative reviews from critics, the projects have achieved commercial success, grossing over a billion dollars collectively. Accolades received include five Grammy awards, an American Music Award, a Golden Reel Award, three Kids' Choice Awards, and Emmy nominations.

A television series, Alvinnn!!! and the Chipmunks was created by Janice Karman and produced by Bagdasarian Productions and Technicolor Animation Productions.

In 2026, it was announced that Big Shot Pictures would buy 25% stake of the franchise to make short form, digital media content, and also a new feature-length movie in the works. At first, the announcement received negative feedback from longtime fans who believed that generative AI would be used and the Chipmunks would become influencers, although it was later revealed that this would not be the case.

== Main characters ==
=== Dave Seville ===
Dave Seville is the adoptive father, manager, and caretaker of Alvin, Simon, and Theodore in the franchise. Created by Ross Bagdasarian Sr. in 1958, Dave is portrayed as a compassionate yet often exasperated figure, trying to balance his career as a songwriter with raising the mischievous Chipmunks. In the live-action/CGI films, Dave is portrayed by Jason Lee, appearing as a loving but strict father figure who helps guide the Chipmunks through their music career.

=== The Chipmunks ===
In the 1980s media Alvin, Simon, and Theodore are about eight to nine years old and triplets, as they celebrate their birthday together in "A Chipmunk Reunion" (Alvin stating to be born five minutes before Simon). The 1983 series revealed that the boys' mother, Vinnie, is a similarly anthropomorphic chipmunk living in a nearby forest. One year a particularly harsh winter had caused a nut shortage. Vinnie realized that her newborn children would likely not survive the winter, so she anonymously left them on Dave's doorstep. She returned briefly to see what happened years later. Dave and the boys were unaware of their origins until they asked him during an argument over the exact date of their birthday. Vinnie had never revealed herself to him, but the boys investigated and eventually tracked her down.

While never mentioned, in the CGI movies and 2015 series, the chipmunks are no longer triplets and celebrate different birthdays, but seem to be around the same school age. In the 2007 feature film, the chipmunks lived in a tree, fending for themselves as their parents had taken off to join a hippie commune and had problems gathering nuts for the winter. Their tree is cut down and carted off to grace the entrance lobby of a city office building, with them in it. They eventually wind up in Dave's home, where they wreak havoc. After being thrown out, Dave notices how well they can sing, making them famous. They eventually win his heart.

=== Ian Hawke ===
Ian Hawke is a recurring character in the Alvin and the Chipmunks franchise's live-action adaptations, first appearing in the 2007 live-action/CGI film. The character is played by David Cross.

=== The Chipettes ===
The Chipettes are a female counterpart to the Chipmunks, introduced in the Alvin and the Chipmunks franchise as their singing rivals and later close friends. Consisting of Brittany, Jeanette, and Eleanor, the trio is known for their distinctive personalities and vocal talents. They first appeared in the 1983 animated series Alvin and the Chipmunks, and were later featured in various films and media adaptations. In the live-action/CGI film series, the Chipettes make their debut in Alvin and the Chipmunks: The Squeakquel (2009) as performers managed by Ian Hawke, who attempts to use them to overshadow the Chipmunks. The Chipettes eventually break free from Ian's control and join forces with the Chipmunks, becoming both their romantic interests and musical collaborators. Throughout the franchise, they remain popular characters, often involved in comedic and musical adventures alongside the Chipmunks.

== Personnel ==
- Alvin Seville – lead and backing vocals
- Simon Seville – lead and backing vocals
- Theodore Seville – lead and backing vocals

== Recording technique ==
The Chipmunks' voices were recorded at half the normal tape speed on audiotape by voice talent (on the 1960s records, generally Ross Bagdasarian's own voice overdubbed three times, on the post-1980s records, studio singers) talking or singing at half the normal speaking rate. When the tape was played back at normal speed, they would sound a full octave higher in pitch, at normal tempo. The use of this technique with the Chipmunks linked this technique to them, with the term chipmunk-voiced entering the American vernacular to describe any artificially high-pitched voice. Bagdasarian recorded vocals and music at different speeds to combine properly on his recording. Guitarist Les Paul said he visited Bagdasarian's studio in 1958 and helped with the recording. The early Hip hop production style of artist Kanye West involved sped-up, high-pitch vocal samples from classic Soul music records incorporated with his own (additional) instrumentation, a style that was to become known as chipmunk soul. Due in part to the acclaim of his debut album The College Dropout, such sampling techniques subsequently became much copied by myriad of other hip-hop producers.

== Guest appearances ==
The Chipmunks made their television debut on The Ed Sullivan Show on December 13, 1959, when they performed "The Chipmunk Song". They were portrayed by puppets.

In 1968, the Chipmunks appeared in an Italian commercial TV program Carosello, in their sponsorship of Prealpi, a cheese-maker in Varese, Italy.

The Chipmunks appeared in the Macy's Thanksgiving Day Parade twice, in 1983 and 1986. At the 1983 parade, they performed "Tomorrow" from the musical Annie. In 1986, they performed "The Girls of Rock and Roll" with The Chipettes as a way to promote their film, The Chipmunk Adventure, which was released six months later.

The Chipmunks performed with Canned Heat on the band's interpretation of "The Chipmunk Song", which is sufficiently derivative of the Chipmunks' 1958 hit that Ross Bagdasarian Sr. gets sole writing credit. It was later featured as the B-side of Canned Heat's single "Christmas Blues", released in late 2009.

The Chipmunks made a guest appearance on Xuxa in 1993, where they performed "Country Pride" from their album, Chipmunks in Low Places.

The Chipmunks appeared on the FOX NFL Sunday intro on December 20, 2009, alongside Digger, the mascot for NASCAR on Fox.

The Chipmunks, portrayed as costumed characters, made an appearance at a preseason game at Dodger Stadium on April 3, 2010, between the Los Angeles Dodgers and Los Angeles Angels. The group performed "America the Beautiful" with a group of children prior to the game. Simon's costume included a Dodgers jersey and a wig similar to then-Dodgers player Manny Ramirez's signature long braids. Ross Bagdasarian Jr. made the opening ceremonial pitch for the game.

The Chipmunks made multiple appearances on ads for food safety to help kids learn safe food practices.

== Merchandise ==
Evergreen Concepts produced merchandise based on the property.

=== Video games ===
- The Chipmunks (1990) – platforms: Tiger Electronic Game.
- Alvin and the Chipmunks (2007) – platforms: Nintendo DS, Wii, PlayStation 2 and Microsoft Windows.
- Alvin and the Chipmunks: The Squeakquel (2009) – platforms: Nintendo DS and Wii.
- Alvin and the Chipmunks: Chipwrecked (2011) – arranger: Eleonora Rossin - platforms: Nintendo DS, Wii and Xbox 360.

== Concert tours ==
- 1984: The Chipmunks and the Magic Camera (The Chipmunks)
- 1985: Alvin and the Chipmunks and the Amazing Computer (The Chipmunks and the Chipettes)
- 2008: Get Munk'd Tour (The Chipmunks)
- 2015: Alvin and the Chipmunks: The Musical (The Chipmunks and the Chipettes)

== Awards and nominations ==
- 1959, won three Grammy Awards for Best Recording for Children, Best Comedy Performance and Best Engineered Record –Non-Classical for the song "The Chipmunk Song" (it was also nominated for Record of the Year, but did not win).
- 1960, won a Grammy Award for Best Engineered Recording -Non-Classical for the song "Alvin's Harmonica."
- 1961, won a Grammy Award for Best Album for Children for the album Let's All Sing with the Chipmunks (it was also nominated for Best Engineered Record -Non-Classical). The song "Alvin for President" was also nominated for both Best Comedy Performance –Musical and Best Engineered Record –Novelty, making two nominations in the latter category.
- 1962, was nominated again for a Grammy Award for Best Engineered Record –Novelty for the television tie-in album The Alvin Show.
- 1963, was nominated again for Grammy Awards for both Best Album for Children and Best Engineered Record –Novelty for the album The Chipmunk Songbook.
- 1966, was nominated for a Grammy Award for Best Recording for Children for the song "Supercalifragilisticexpialidocious".
- 1985, was nominated for an Emmy Award in the category "Outstanding Animated Program (Daytime)."
- 1987, the second television series was nominated for a Young Artist Award in the category "Exceptional Family Animation Series or Specials."
- 1987, was nominated for an Emmy Award in the category "Outstanding Animated Program (Daytime)."
- 1988, was nominated for an Emmy Award in the category "Outstanding Animated Program (Daytime)."
- 1988, was nominated for a Young Artist Award in the category "Best Motion Picture –Animation" for the movie The Chipmunk Adventure.
- 2000, won the Golden Reel Award in the category "Best Sound Editing –Direct to Video – Sound Editorial" for the movie Alvin and the Chipmunks Meet Frankenstein.
- 2008, Jason Lee won the Kids' Choice Awards in the category "Favorite Movie" for the movie Alvin and the Chipmunks.
- 2008, the 2007 Alvin and the Chipmunks soundtrack won the American Music Award for "Best Movie Soundtrack."
- 2010, Alvin and the Chipmunks: The Squeakquel won the Kids' Choice Awards in the category "Favorite Movie."
- 2012, Alvin and the Chipmunks: Chipwrecked won the 2012 Kids' Choice Awards in the category "Favorite Movie."
- 2019, earned a star on the Hollywood Walk of Fame.

== See also ==
- Chipmunk soul
