= The Chipmunk Song (Christmas Don't Be Late) =

1958 novelty song by Ross Bagdasarian

- Picture sleeve of 1959 reissue single by Liberty Records (F-55250)

Single by Alvin and the Chipmunks and David Seville

from the album Let's All Sing with The Chipmunks
- B-side: "Almost Good"; "Alvin's Harmonica" (reissues)
- Released: November 17, 1958
- Recorded: October 31, 1958
- Genre: Christmas; pop; novelty
- Length: 2:21: 2:15 (rock version)
- Label: Liberty F-55168; Liberty F-55250
- Songwriter: Ross Bagdasarian
- Producer: Ross Bagdasarian

Alvin and the Chipmunks and David Seville singles chronology
"The Bird on My Head" (1958)	"The Chipmunk Song (Christmas Don't Be Late)" (1958)	"Alvin's Harmonica" (1959)

Alternate cover
- 1961 reissue, utilizing the animated makeovers for The Alvin Show

"The Chipmunk Song (Christmas Don't Be Late)" is a 1958 novelty Christmas carol written and recorded by Ross Bagdasarian (under the stage name of David Seville). Bagdasarian sang the Christmas carol, varying the tape speeds to produce high-pitched "chipmunk" voices, with the vocals credited to Alvin and the Chipmunks, Seville's cartoon virtual band and later media franchise. The song was nominated for Record of the Year in the 1st Annual Grammy Awards, where it also won three awards.

After the success of "Witch Doctor" in early 1958, Liberty Records asked Bagdasarian to create another successful novelty record. He then came up with three singing chipmunks named after Liberty Records executives.

The song begins with Dave asking the Chipmunks if they're ready to sing the song. Simon and Theodore both say they are, but when Alvin doesn't answer, Dave yells his name. After the first verse, Dave compliments Simon and Theodore for their singing, but tells Alvin that his performance was "a little flat". Again, Alvin does not respond so Dave yells again. In the outro, the Chipmunks want to sing the song again, however, David is against this, telling them not to overdo it. The song fades out with spoken lines from Dave and the Chipmunks.

"The Chipmunk Song" has been a staple on the Billboard charts and saved Liberty Records from near-bankruptcy. It has been featured in many movies and television shows, including a prominent appearance in the successful 2007 live-action film Alvin and the Chipmunks. The song helped launch the multimillion-dollar Alvin and the Chipmunks brand and has been ranked by Billboard and The New York Times as one of the greatest Christmas songs of all time.

== Background ==
=== "Witch Doctor" ===
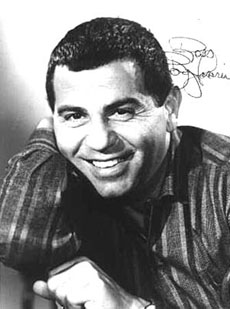
Ross Bagdasarian in the 50s

In the early stages of his career, Ross Bagdasarian, a Broadway actor who had played a pianist in Alfred Hitchcock's 1954 Rear Window, was down to his last $200 when he purchased a specialized tape recorder that could adjust the speed of recordings. Experimenting with the device, he discovered a technique in which he recorded his slowly-sung voice at half speed and then played it back at normal speed, creating a high-pitched squeaky voice. This technique was pioneered on his successful 1958 novelty song “Witch Doctor”. In the song, the narrator asks a witch doctor for romantic advice because he has fallen in love with a girl; the witch doctor responds in a high-pitched squeaky voice with a nonsense incantation which creates an earworm. He used this technique on another pre-Chipmunks track, "Bird on My Head." The song held number one for three weeks in the Billboard Hot 100 chart, ranked by Billboard as the No. 4 song for 1958.

=== The Chipmunks ===
Bagdasarian later conceived the idea of Alvin and the Chipmunks, who were named, as an inside joke, after executives at Liberty Records; Alvin (named after Al Bennett), Simon (named after Simon Waronker), and Theodore (Ted Keep). After its release on November 11 of that year, "The Chipmunk Song" remained on the charts for 13 weeks, including four weeks at number one. The song earned three Grammy Awards and was later adapted into a short for The Alvin Show (1961–1962). In 2007, following the release of the live-action Alvin and the Chipmunks film, the song reappeared on the charts nearly five decades after its initial success. Bagdasarian performed as both David Seville and the voices of all three Chipmunks.

== Context and performance ==
The song was released on November 17, 1958. Although initially featured on American Bandstand's "Rate-A-Record" segment with the lowest possible rating of 35 across the board, "The Chipmunk Song" became a number one hit by early 1959. One phrase in the chorus has Alvin wishing for a hula hoop, which was that year's hot new toy. The novelty record was highly successful, selling 4.5 million copies in seven weeks, eventually selling 12 million copies. Bagdasarian performed the song at The Ed Sullivan Show.

As of 2011, total sales were estimated at 867,000 copies, making "The Chipmunk Song" among the top 20 best-selling Christmas songs of all time. The song was the 23rd most performed Christmas song of the 20th century.

== Chart performance ==
It spent four weeks at number one on the Billboard Hot 100 chart from December 22, 1958, to January 12, 1959, succeeding "To Know Him Is to Love Him" at number one on the same chart by the Teddy Bears. It was also number one for four weeks in Canada, December 15, 1958, to January 5, 1959. "The Chipmunk Song" appeared on the Chipmunks' debut album, Let's All Sing with the Chipmunks, in 1959, and was repeated on Christmas with the Chipmunks, released in 1962. It was the only Christmas record to reach No. 1 on the same chart until Mariah Carey's "All I Want for Christmas Is You" did so 61 years later in 2019. In 1958, it won Grammy Awards for Best Comedy Performance, Best Children's Recording, and Best Engineered Record (non-classical).

The song was certified Gold by the RIAA as one of the best-selling physical Christmas singles in the United States. Between 1958 and 1962, the single re-entered the Hot 100 several times, peaking at No. 41 in 1958, No. 45 in 1960, and No. 39 in 1962. (Starting in 1963, Billboard would list recurrent Christmas songs on a separate chart.) The song charted on the Hot Digital Songs for the first time in 2005, peaking at No. 35. With the release and popularity of the live-action film Alvin and the Chipmunks in 2007, "The Chipmunk Song" re-entered the Billboard Hot 100 at No. 70. At the same time, a remixed version of the song that appears on the Chipmunks' 2007 album (and soundtrack to the film) Alvin and the Chipmunks: Original Motion Picture Soundtrack, peaked at No. 66.

== In popular culture ==
The original recording of the song is included in Look Who's Talking Now! (1993), Donnie Brasco (1997), an episode of The King of Queens (1998), Almost Famous (2000), and The Fate of the Furious (2017). Bob Rivers released a parody of the song for his 2000 Christmas album Chipmunks Roasting on an Open Fire. Norah Jones recorded a cover of the song for her 2021 Christmas album, I Dream of Christmas.

- Amy Grant recorded a cover of the song for her 2016 release Tennessee Christmas.
- The Chipmunks performed a smooth jazz version of the song with Kenny G on the saxophone for their 1994 album A Very Merry Chipmunk.
- The Goo Goo Dolls recorded a cover of the song for their 2020 album It's Christmas All Over.
- Bryson Tiller and Pentatonix recorded an a cappella version of the song as a standalone single in 2021
- The Philly Specials covered the song for their 2024 charity album A Philly Special Christmas Party.
- In the 2009 film, Ice Age: Dawn of the Dinosaurs, the opossums, Crash and Eddie sing when they find out that their voices are high pitched.

== Track listing ==
=== Original 1958 release ===
No.	Title	Credited artist	Length
1.	"The Chipmunk Song (Christmas Don't Be Late)" (Ross Bagdasarian Sr.)	David Seville and The Chipmunks	2:17
2.	"Almost Good" (Ross Bagdasarian Sr., Mark McIntyre)	The Music of David Seville	2:02

=== 1959 reissue ===
All tracks are written by Ross Bagdasarian Sr.

No.	Title	Credited artist	Length
1.	"The Chipmunk Song (Christmas Don't Be Late)"	David Seville and The Chipmunks	2:17
2.	"Alvin's Harmonica"	David Seville and The Chipmunks	2:39

=== 1961 reissue ===
All tracks are written by Ross Bagdasarian Sr.

No.	Title	Credited artist	Length
1.	"The Chipmunk Song (Christmas Don't Be Late)"	Alvin, Simon and Theodore with David Seville	2:17
2.	"Alvin's Harmonica"	Alvin, Simon and Theodore with David Seville	2:39

== See also ==
- List of Christmas carols
- List of Hot 100 number-one singles of 1958 (U.S.)
