= The Hits (Dr. Bombay album) =

Compilation album by Dr. Bombay
- Released: December 2007
- Genre: Bubblegum dance Eurodance
- Label: Warner Bros.

Dr. Bombay chronology
| World Wild (2007) | The Hits (2007) |

The Hits is a compilation album by Swedish Eurodance artist Jonny Jakobsen. It was published by Warner Bros. Records in 2007.

Although released under the pseudonym of Dr. Bombay, the album also features a number of tracks released by Jakobsen as Dr. Macdoo as well and, despite being a compilation, features two song that have not appeared on any of his previous studio albums.

== Track listing ==
1. Calcutta (Taxi Taxi Taxi) – 3:19
2. Rice & Curry – 3:13
3. S.O.S (The Tiger Took My Family) – 3:26
4. Shaky Snake – 3:03
5. Spice It Up – 3:18
6. Girlie Girlie – 3:10
7. My Sitar – 3:04
8. Indy Dancing – 3:18
9. FamilyMacDoo – 3:07
10. Highland Reggae (From Glasgow To Bombay) – 3:27
11. Macahula Dance – 3:03
12. Mayday! Mayday! – 3:13
13. Loch Ness – 3:12
14. Under The Kilt – 3:13
15. Mad Piper – 3:18
16. Grandfather Mac Macdoo – 3:07
17. Calcutta 2008 - Basshunter Remix – 3:20

== Bonus material ==
In addition to a compilation of Jakobsen's most successful songs, the album features one never before released song, "Spice it Up", and a new remix of "Calcutta (Taxi Taxi Taxi)" by fellow Eurodance artist Basshunter.

Also-included in the compilation are music videos for the following songs:

1. Calcutta (Taxi, Taxi, Taxi)
2. Rice & Curry
3. S.O.S (The Tiger Took My Family)
4. Girlie Girlie
5. Macahula Dance
6. Under The Kilt
