= Yuki Hsu =

Taiwanese singer and actress

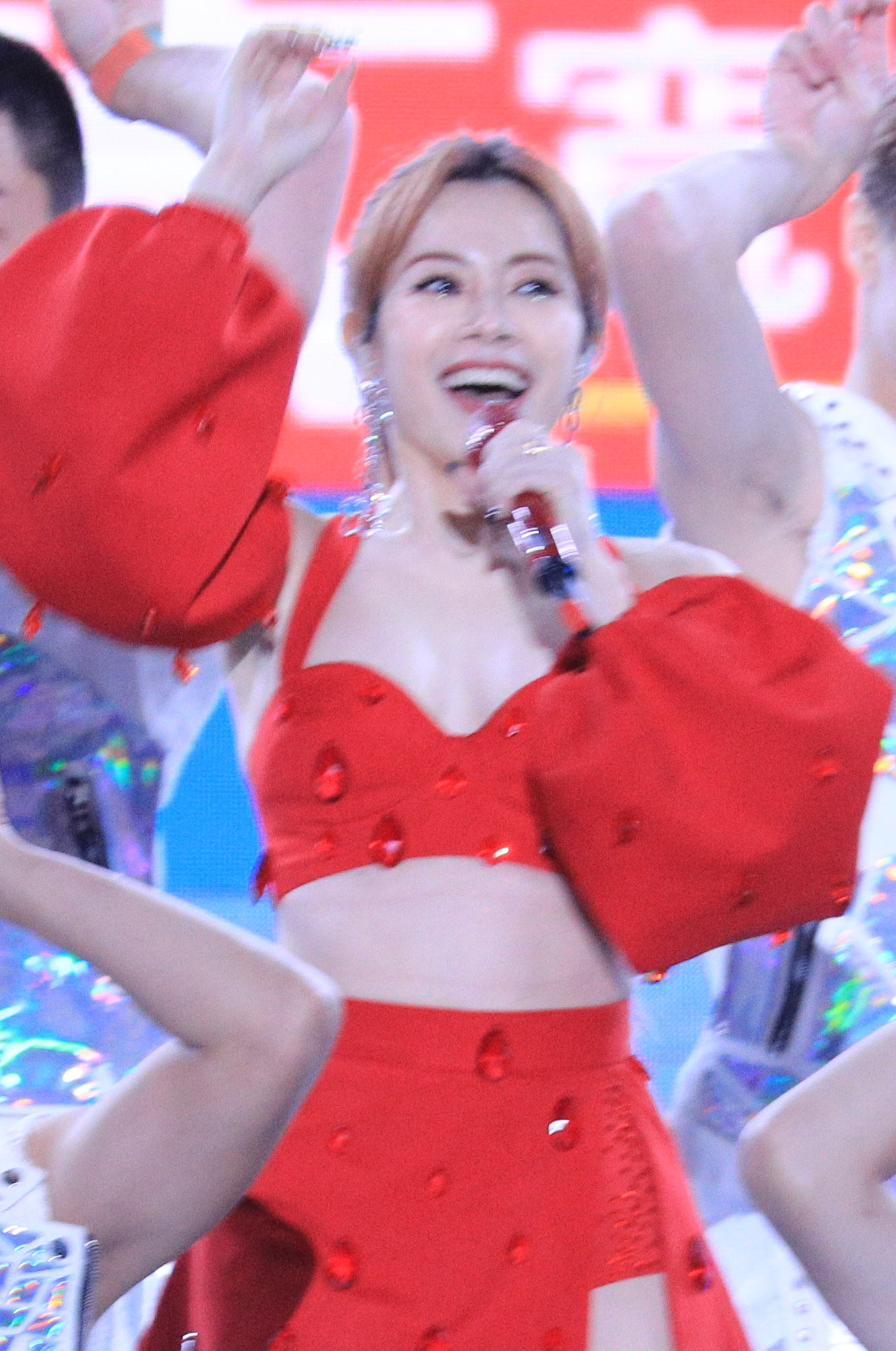
- Born: Hsu Huai-yu; 3 March 1979 (age 46); Taipei, Taiwan
- Occupations: Singer, actress
- Years active: 1998–2002; 2007–present

Chinese name
- Traditional Chinese: 徐懷鈺
- Simplified Chinese: 徐怀钰
- Wade–Giles: Hsü^{2} Huai^{2}-yü^{4}
- Hanyu Pinyin: Xú Huáiyù
Transcriptions
Standard Mandarin
- Hanyu Pinyin: Xú Huáiyù
- Bopomofo: ㄒㄩˊ ㄏㄨㄞˊ ㄩˋ
- Wade–Giles: Hsü^{2} Huai^{2}-yü^{4}
- Musical career
- Genres: Pop
- Instrument: Vocals

Yuki Hsu (born 3 March 1979) is a Taiwanese singer and actress. She is perhaps best known for her series of hits in Taiwan between 1998 and 2001. Most of her songs in her early career are upbeat, catchy, melodic dance tracks, often with youthful themes or lyrics. Some of her well-known songs include "Ding Dong" (a cover of Danish singer Tiggy's hit "Ring A Ling"), "Who's Bad" (a cover of Dr Bombay's "Calcutta (Taxi Taxi Taxi)"), and a remake of the '90s techno track "Dub-i-Dub". In 1999 she collaborated with South Korean rapper Yoo Seung Jun on the duet "Can't Wait". She is also noted for the flamboyant and outlandish hairdos she sported in many of her early music videos.

In 2001, Hsu temporarily ceased her singing career and turned to acting. In 2007, she returned to the music scene with the album Bad Girl.

On 25 May 2018, Yuki Hsu held the concert, Only for Meeting You (只為「鈺」見你), at Taipei International Convention Center, celebrating her 20 years of singing career.

== Personal life ==
Hsu faded into obscurity in the aftermath of a legal quagmire involving contract breaches and negative press covers. The court charged her with NT$2 million in damages and legal fines, and her mother borrowed money to help them get by.

In 2010, she took on a job as an unpaid paralegal assistant so that she can study legal matters to prepare herself for her legal challenges.

In 2011 Hsu claims that her former manager, Wu Zu Wang, of Dragon Imperium International Film Production Corp, texted inappropriate messages to her. She states that she has a backlog of such messages.

Hsu was sued for a breach of contract when she failed to show up for a concert and made unauthorized public appearances on Taiwanese broadcasts.

== Discography ==
=== Singles ===
- (1998.01) "Flying" (飛起來)
- (1998.08) "5.6.7.8. Going"
- (1999.03) "Magic Woman Of Love 2 Generation" (with Wen Ying) (魔法阿媽之戀愛2 世代)
- (2002.08) 澀女郎電視劇原聲帶

=== Studio albums ===
- (1998.03) First Album(第一張個人專輯)
- (1998.10) Go!Go!Go! (向前衝)
- (1999.06) The Angel (天使)
- (2000.01) Love
- (2001.08) Miss Right
- (2007.05) Bad Girl
- (2024.12) Phototransformation

=== Compilations ===
- (2000.09) U'Want (欲望)
- (2003.01) Rock Hong Kong 10th Anniversary – Yuki Hsu Greatest Hits (滾石香港黃金十年：徐懷鈺精選)

== Filmography ==
- Love Catcher (幸福捕手), 2008
- Ao Jian Jiang Hu (傲剑江湖), 2007
- Geng Zi Feng Yun (庚子风云), 2006
- The Strait Story (南方紀事之浮世光影), 2005
- The Voyage of Emperor Qian Long to Jiang Nan (乾隆皇下江南), 2003
- Love Train (心動列車), 2003
- Tweeny Witches (Jp.: 魔法少女隊 アルス; Ch.: 孩子女巫), voice, 2003
- The Monkey King: Quest for the Sutra, (齊天大圣孫悟空), 2002
- The Beauty Mermaid (天地傳說之魚美人), 2001
- Toshinden Subaru, the New Generation (鬥神傳 新的産生), voice, 2001
- Battle Arena Toshinden (鬥神傳), voice, 1998
