= Who Put the Bomp (in the Bomp, Bomp, Bomp) =

Single by Barry Mann

from the album Who Put the Bomp
- B-side: "Love, True Love"
- Released: 1961
- Recorded: June 21, 1961
- Studio: Brill Building
- Genre: Doo-wop; Novelty song
- Length: 2:46
- Label: ABC-Paramount
- Songwriters: Barry Mann; Gerry Goffin
- Producers: Al Nevins; Don Kirshner

"Who Put the Bomp (in the Bomp, Bomp, Bomp)" is a doo-wop style novelty song from 1961 by the American songwriter Barry Mann, who wrote it with Gerry Goffin. It was originally released as a single on the ABC-Paramount label (10237).

== Lyrics ==
In this song, Mann sings about the frequent use of nonsense lyrics in doo-wop music, and how his girl fell in love with him after listening to several such songs.

Examples of the type of song referred to include The Marcels' version of "Blue Moon" (in which they sing "Bomp bomp ba bomp, ba bomp ba bomp bomp" and "dip-de-dip-de-dip") and The Edsels' "Rama-Lama-Ding-Dong", both of which charted earlier the same year. The spoken section is a reference to the song "Little Darlin'" by the Diamonds. "Boogidy shoo" can be found in the lyrics to "Pony Time" by Chubby Checker, released earlier that year. Mann was backed up by the Halos, a doo-wop group of its own renown that had a single top-40 hit with "Nag" and also sang on Curtis Lee's hit "Pretty Little Angel Eyes."

== Chart performance ==
The single debuted on Billboard's Hot 100 on August 7, 1961, and remained for twelve weeks, peaking at #7. In Canada the song was #1 for 3 weeks, starting August 14, 1961. Mann's version did not chart in the UK, though a cover version by the Viscounts reached #21 there in September 1961. The Viscounts' record was in turn covered by comedians Morecambe and Wise, with the same melody and modified lyrics ("We put the Bomp in the..."); the record was titled "We're the Guys (Who Drive Your Baby Wild)".

A newer version, by Showaddywaddy, charted at #37 in August 1982.

== In popular culture ==
The song has been recorded or referenced by:

- The Viscounts, on the album Who Put the Bomp—The Pye Anthology (1961)
- Grease, We Go Together (1978)
- The Boppers, a Swedish rockabilly band in 1979
- Showaddywaddy, "Who put the Bomp in the Bomp a Bomp a Bomp a Bomp" (1982)
- Sharon, Lois & Bram, on their 1995 album Let's Dance!
- Cartoons, on their 1998 album Toonage
- The Overtones, on their 2013 album Saturday Night at the Movies
- The Heebee-jeebees, on their live album Surgical Strike
- Jan and Dean (who claim "We put the bomp...")
- Le Tigre ("Who took the Bomp from the Bompalompalomp" is incorporated into Deceptacon on their 1999 debut self-titled album Le Tigre)
- Frankie Lymon (who claims "I put the bomp...", and opens the song with the "Oo-wah, oo-wah" that opened his hit song with the Teenagers, "Why Do Fools Fall in Love")
- Me First and the Gimme Gimmes, on the album Blow in the Wind
- The Muppets
- The Grim Adventures of Billy & Mandy
- The Real Group, on their album Debut
- The Wurzels
- Los Twist (spanish version of the song)
- Ol' 55, on their album The Vault (1980)
- A parody, "Who'll Put a Bomb on Saddam Saddam Saddam" was introduced in the political satirists Capitol Steps' 1990 album, Sheik, Rattle and Roll. A later parody, "Who put the Bomb in Tehran, Tehran, Tehran", was produced by Capitol Steps and included in their book Sixteen Scandals and accompanying CD.
- In the Full House episode "Joey Goes Hollywood" (Season 4, episode 23), the song is sung by Frankie Avalon and Annette Funicello in the pilot for Surf's Up, a fictitious TV show.
- A parody, "Who Put the Mush", was written and performed by The McCalmans. In an inversion of the original song, the singer's girlfriend leaves him due to the nonsense lyrics in his folk music. It was released in 1994 on the album Songs from Scotland.
- Bentley Rhythm Ace had a track called "Who Put the Bom in the Bom Bom Diddleye Bom" on their debut album.
- The audio introduction at the Boston Museum of Science's Mugar Omni Theater includes actor and Boston native Leonard Nimoy reciting the first two lines of the chorus of "Who Put the Bomp".
- The song was parodied by Bob Rivers as "Who Put the Stump?" on his fourth Christmas album Chipmunks Roasting on an Open Fire, written from the perspective of an angel on top of a Christmas tree, involving the tree being inserted up the angel's rectum. The lyrics include "Who put the stump in my rump ba-bump ba-bump". A remix titled "Stumpmaster Remix" was also included as the final track on the same album.
- The song is referenced in Swedish comedy group Grotesco's sketch "The Trial", a parody of American courtroom dramas, in which the characters speak broken English (without subtitles) to a confused Swedish audience.
- Chuck Prophet's 2004 album, Age of Miracles, includes the song, "You Did (Bomp Shooby Dooby Bomp)", which contains the lyric, "Who put the bomp in the bomp shooby dooby bomp? Who put the ram in the ram a lama ding dong? You did, you did".
- In July 2017 fictional UK comedy character Alan Partridge selected the track as one of his favourite ever songs (along with the theme tune to the BBC sports show Grandstand) in a feature for the Radio 4 show Inheritance Tracks.
- At the restaurant Gadgets, which had a show featuring animatronics of the Looney Tunes characters (with voices reprised by Mel Blanc), one track titled "Sensational Sixties" featured Porky Pig singing "Who Put the Bomp".
- The song inspired the title of the music magazine Who Put the Bomp, published from 1970 to 1979, as well as the record label BOMP! Records, both founded by Greg Shaw.
