= Toonage =

Studio album by Cartoons
- Released: 24 September 1998
- Recorded: 1998
- Genre: Eurodance
- Length: 34:01
- Label: FLEX
- Producer: Kenneth Bager

Cartoons chronology
Toonage (1998)	Toontastic (2001)

Singles from Toonage
- 1. "DooDah" Released: 1998; 2. "Witch Doctor" Released: 1998; 3. "Yoko" Released: 1998; 4. "Let's Go Childish" Released: 1998; 5. "Aisy Waisy" Released: 1999

Toonage is the debut album by the Danish band Cartoons, released on 24 September 1998. The album includes the group's biggest hit, "Witch Doctor", a cover version of Ross Bagdasarian's novelty song from 1958, which reached number 2 on the UK Singles Chart. The album's first single, "DooDah", adapted from the American folk song "Camptown Races", was a hit also in several countries, including Denmark, where it reached number 3 on the Danish charts. The album's fifth single, "Aisy Waisy", was a Top 20 hit. The album reached Top 10 in the national charts of Denmark, Italy, Portugal and Spain.

An expansion of the album, titled More Toonage, was released in 1999. Besides other versions of "Witch Doctor" and "DooDah" in other languages and a few other extras, it includes the tracks from "The X-Mas Single".

== Track listings ==
Toonage track listing
No.	Title	Length
1.	"Witch Doctor"	3:06
2.	"DooDah"	3:12
3.	"Hold Me"	3:06
4.	"Ramalama Daisy"	3:43
5.	"Yoko"	3:25
6.	"Who Put the Bomp"	3:46
7.	"De Do Do Do De Da Da Da"	3:20
8.	"Let's Go Childish"	3:05
9.	"Aisy Waisy"	2:57
10.	"Listen to My Heart"	4:21

Italy bonus track
No.	Title	Length
11.	"Tutto Passerà" (Witch Doctor)	3:06

More Toonage bonus tracks
No.	Title	Length
11.	"DooDah" (Spanish Version)	3:12
12.	"Witch Doctor" (Spanish Version)	3:06
13.	"Santa Claus Is Coming to Town"	2:46
14.	"Just Can't Wait"	3:32
15.	"Millenium Megamix"	4:59

More Toonage Italy bonus tracks
No.	Title	Length
11.	"Santa Claus Is Coming to Town"	2:46
12.	"Just Can't Wait"	3:32
13.	"Millenium Megamix"	4:59
14.	"Tutto Passerà" (Italian Version of "Witch Doctor")	3:06
15.	"Aisy Waisy" (Stimulater's Radio Mix)	2:57
16.	"Witch Doctor Video"	3:23
17.	"DooDah Video"	3:30
18.	"Aisy Waisy Video"	3:01

== Charts ==
=== Weekly charts ===
Chart (1998–99)	Peak position
Belgian Albums (Ultratop Flanders)	25
Dutch Albums (Album Top 100)	24
Danish Albums (Hitlisten)	61
Norwegian Albums (VG-lista)	14
Spanish Albums (Promusicae)	9
Scottish Albums (Official Charts)	15
Italian Albums (FIMI)	6
Swedish Albums (Sverigetopplistan)	12
Portuguese Albums (AFP)	10
UK Albums (Official Charts)	17

=== Year-end charts ===
Chart (1999)	Position
Belgian Albums (Ultratop Flanders)	95
Dutch Albums (Album Top 100)	96
UK Albums (OCC)	152

== Certifications ==
Region	Certification	Certified units/sales
Spain (Promusicae)	Platinum	100,000^{^}
Sweden (GLF)	Gold	40,000^{^}
United Kingdom (BPI)	Gold	100,000^{^}
^{^} Shipments figures based on certification alone.
