= Henrik Carlsen =

Danish composer

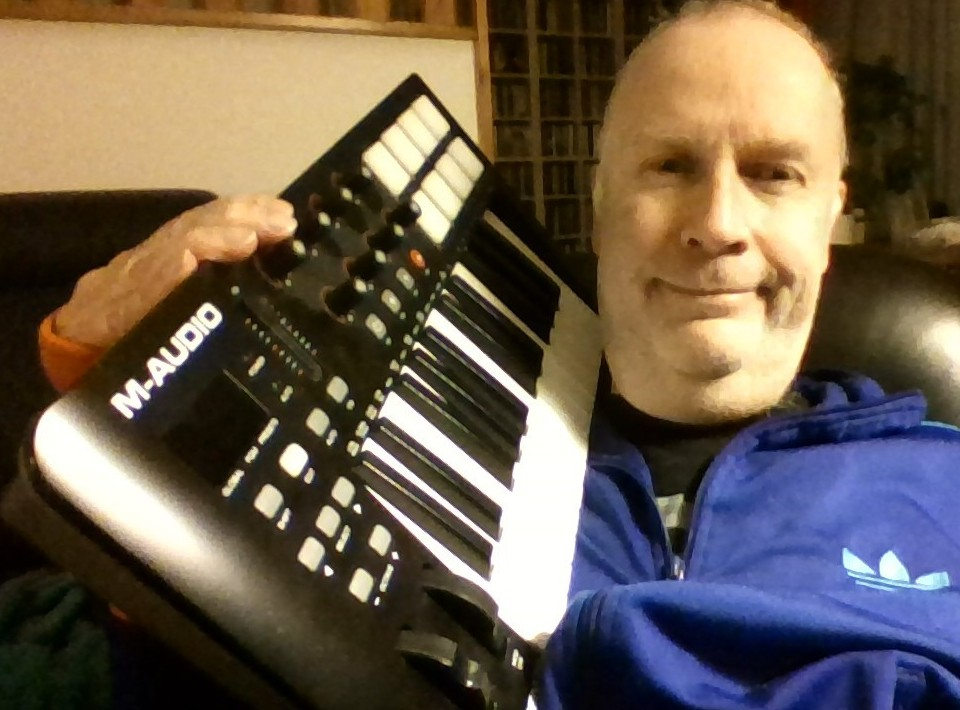
- Henrik Carlsen with keyboard, 2017
- Born: Henrik Carlsen; 30 November 1959 (age 66); Frederiksberg, Denmark
- Occupation: Songwriter, pianist
- Years active: 1982–present

Henrik Carlsen (born 30 November 1959) is a Danish composer, record producer, singer, and keyboardist.

== Background ==
Carlsen was born in Copenhagen, Frederiksberg and grew up in Brøndby. He was a founding member of Street Beat in 1982 and led it until it was disbanded in 1993.

As a composer, he has written or co-written pop-songs like "Ring A Ling" (Tiggy), "Diddley-Dee" (Cartoons), "Easy Come Easy Go" (Los Umbrellos), and worked as producer or re-mixer with Barcode Brothers, E-Type, Blå Øjne and others.

He was diagnosed with multiple sclerosis in 2001. He retired from the music business and worked as a school teacher until 2016.

In 2016, he returned to music and released his first solo album, Street Beat Revisited. The album was a homage to his former band Street Beat, and he played all instruments himself, recording the entire album in his own bedroom. He is permanently in a wheelchair and has lost all walking ability.

In November 2019, Carlsen released the instrumental album WXYZ, again composing, arranging, performing, and producing all music by himself in his home studio.

Another instrumental jazz-rock fusion album was released in November 2022. This was a follow-up and named WXYZ II. It consisted of 11 tracks, one of them being a classical serenade For Linda played on a sampled Stradivarius violin.
