= DooDah! =

1998 single by Cartoons

"DooDah"

Single by Cartoons

from the album Toonage
- Released: 1998
- Genre: Eurodance
- Length: 3:12
- Label: FLEX; EMI
- Songwriters: Martin Østengaard (Toonie); Jesper Dukholt (Sponge); Erling Jensen (Shooter)
- Producers: Sponge; Toonie; Michael Pfundheller

Cartoons singles chronology
"DooDah" (1998)	"Witch Doctor" (1998)

Music video
- "DooDah" on YouTube

"DooDah" (stylised as "DooDah!") is a song by Danish band Cartoons, released by FLEX Records and EMI in 1998 as their debut single. It was included on their first album, Toonage. The song is a Eurodance cover of "Camptown Races" with changed lyrics.

== Track listing ==
No.	Title	Length
1.	"DooDah" (Radio N' Roll mix)	3:12
2.	"DooDah" (Extended Technobilly mit Spass mix)	4:30
3.	"DooDah" (Grease und Gemüse remix)	6:13
4.	"DooDah" (Sunzet Dialogue remix)	5:00

== Charts ==
=== Weekly charts ===
Chart (1998–1999)	Peak position
Australia (ARIA)	31
Belgium (Ultratop 50 Flanders)	5
Canada Dance/Urban (RPM)	16
Denmark (Tracklisten)	3
Europe (Eurochart Hot 100)	32
Ireland (IRMA)	21
Italy (Musica e dischi)	9
Netherlands (Dutch Tipparade 40)	5
Netherlands (Single Top 100)	56
New Zealand (Recorded Music NZ)	31
Scottish Singles Sales (Official Charts)	6
Spain (Promusicae)	19
Sweden (Sverigetopplistan)	10
UK Singles (Official Charts)	7

=== Year-end charts ===
Chart (1998)	Position
Belgium (Ultratop 50 Flanders)	24
Europe Border Breakers (Music & Media)	85
Sweden (Hitlistan)	65

Chart (1999)	Position
UK Singles (OCC)	135

== Certifications ==
Region	Certification	Certified units/sales
Belgium (BRMA)	Gold	25,000^{*}
Sweden (GLF)	Gold	15,000^{^}
^{*} Sales figures based on certification alone.^{^} Shipments figures based on certification alone.
