= List of number-one hits of 1997 (Denmark) =

This is a list of the Danish Singles Chart number-one hits of 1997 from the International Federation of the Phonographic Industry and Nielsen Soundscan. They were provided through Billboard magazine under the "Hits of the World" section.

== Chart history ==
Issue date	Song	Artist
2 January	"Roses Are Red"	Aqua
9 January	"Roses Are Red"	Aqua
16 January	"Roses Are Red"	Aqua
23 January	"Roses Are Red"	Aqua
30 January	"Don't Speak"	No Doubt
6 February	"Don't Speak"	No Doubt
13 February	"Ring A Ling"	Tiggy
20 February	"Ring A Ling"	Tiggy
27 February	"Ring A Ling"	Tiggy
6 March	"Ring A Ling"	Tiggy
13 March	"Ring A Ling"	Tiggy
20 March	"Ring A Ling"	Tiggy
27 March	"Ring A Ling"	Tiggy
3 April	"Don't Let Go (Love)"	En Vogue
10 April	"Don't Let Go (Love)"	En Vogue
17 April	"Don't Let Go (Love)"	En Vogue
22 April	"Don't Let Go (Love)"	En Vogue
30 April	"Blood On The Dancefloor"	Michael Jackson
7 May	"Blood On The Dancefloor"	Michael Jackson
14 May	"Blood On The Dancefloor"	Michael Jackson
21 May	"Star People '97"	George Michael
28 May	"MMMBop"	Hanson
4 June	"MMMBop"	Hanson
11 June	"MMMBop"	Hanson
19 June	"MMMBop"	Hanson
26 June	"MMMBop"	Hanson
3 July	"Bailando"	Paradisio
10 July	"Bailando"	Paradisio
17 July	"I'll Be Missing You"	Puff Daddy & Faith Evans feat. 112
24 July	"I'll Be Missing You"	Puff Daddy & Faith Evans feat. 112
31 July	"I'll Be Missing You"	Puff Daddy & Faith Evans feat. 112
7 August	"I'll Be Missing You"	Puff Daddy & Faith Evans feat. 112
14 August	"I'll Be Missing You"	Puff Daddy & Faith Evans feat. 112
21 August	"I'll Be Missing You"	Puff Daddy & Faith Evans feat. 112
28 August	"I'll Be Missing You"	Puff Daddy & Faith Evans feat. 112
4 September	"I'll Be Missing You"	Puff Daddy & Faith Evans feat. 112
11 September	"I'll Be Missing You"	Puff Daddy & Faith Evans feat. 112
18 September	"Candle In The Wind 1997"/"Something About The Way You Look Tonight"	Elton John
25 September	"Candle In The Wind 1997"/"Something About The Way You Look Tonight"	Elton John
2 October	"Candle In The Wind 1997"/"Something About The Way You Look Tonight"	Elton John
9 October	"Candle In The Wind 1997"/"Something About The Way You Look Tonight"	Elton John
16 October	"Candle In The Wind 1997"/"Something About The Way You Look Tonight"	Elton John
23 October	"Candle In The Wind 1997"/"Something About The Way You Look Tonight"	Elton John
30 October	"Candle In The Wind 1997"/"Something About The Way You Look Tonight"	Elton John
6 November	"Candle In The Wind 1997"/"Something About The Way You Look Tonight"	Elton John
13 November	"Candle In The Wind 1997"/"Something About The Way You Look Tonight"	Elton John
20 November	"Candle In The Wind 1997"/"Something About The Way You Look Tonight"	Elton John
27 November	"Candle In The Wind 1997"/"Something About The Way You Look Tonight"	Elton John
4 December	"Candle In The Wind 1997"/"Something About The Way You Look Tonight"	Elton John
11 December	"Candle In The Wind 1997"/"Something About The Way You Look Tonight"	Elton John
18 December	"Candle In The Wind 1997"/"Something About The Way You Look Tonight"	Elton John
25 December	"Candle In The Wind 1997"/"Something About The Way You Look Tonight"	Elton John

== See also ==
- 1997 in music
