= Heebie-jeebies =

Heebie-jeebies is a phrase, widely attributed to Billy DeBeck, meaning a feeling of anxiety, apprehension, depression or illness.

Heebie-jeebies or heebie jeebies may also refer to:

- "Heebie Jeebies" (composition), a 1926 single by Louis Armstrong and his Hot Five
- "Heeby-Jeebies", a 1956 single by Little Richard
- "Heebiejeebies", a song on the album Good for You by Aminé featuring Kehlani
- The Heebee-jeebees, an a capella band from Canada
- The Hee Bee Gee Bees, a comedy parody of the Bee Gees
- Heebee Jeebees, a 1927 lost comedy film
- Heebie Jeebies (film), a 2013 science fiction horror film
