= Witch Doctor (song) =

1958 song by Ross Bagdasarian

Single by David Seville

from the album Sing Again with The Chipmunks
- B-side: "Don't Whistle at Me, Baby"
- Released: April 1958
- Genre: Novelty
- Length: 2:15: 3:02 (2007 version featuring DJ Chris Classic)
- Label: Liberty
- Songwriter: Ross Bagdasarian
- Producer: Ross Bagdasarian

David Seville singles chronology
"Witch Doctor" (1958)	"The Bird on My Head" (1958)

"Witch Doctor" is a 1958 American novelty song written and recorded by Ross Bagdasarian under the stage name of David Seville. Bagdasarian sang the song, varying the tape speeds to produce a high-pitched voice for the "witch doctor".

This technique was later used in his next song, "The Bird on My Head", and for the creation of the voices of his virtual band Alvin and the Chipmunks. The song became a number one hit and rescued Liberty Records from near bankruptcy; it held number one for three weeks in the Billboard Hot 100 chart, ranked by Billboard as the No. 4 song for 1958.

In the song, the narrator asks a witch doctor for romantic advice because he has fallen in love with a girl; the witch doctor responds in a high-pitched, squeaky voice with a nonsense incantation which creates an earworm: "Oo-ee-oo-ah-ah, ting-tang, walla-walla-bing-bang."

== History ==
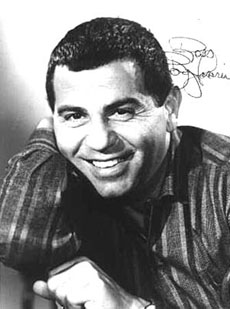
Ross Bagdasarian in the '50s

Ross Bagdasarian, a Broadway actor who was a pianist in Alfred Hitchcock's 1954 film Rear Window, wrote the song, inspired by a book titled Duel with a Witch Doctor on his bookshelf. Bagdasarian had spent $200, a significant sum at that time, on a specialized tape recorder; while experimenting with the device, he had an idea of recording his voice at a different speed to create a dialogue between himself and the witch doctor. He sang in his own voice as normal, and then overdubbed the song with the voice of the "witch doctor", which is his own voice sung slowly but recorded at half speed on the tape recorder, then played back at normal speed (the voice was therefore sped up to become a high-pitched, squeaky one). Bagdasarian recorded the music first, and then experimented with the process for creating the singing voice for two months before recording it in the studio. It was said that when Si Waronker from the financially troubled Liberty Records label heard the resulting song, they released it to reach the shops within 24 hours.

The same technique used to create the voice of the witch doctor was used in Bagdasarian's next song "The Bird on My Head", and then more significantly the highly successful Alvin and the Chipmunks, beginning with "The Chipmunk Song (Christmas Don't Be Late)" released for Christmas 1958. Initially released under David Seville alone, "Witch Doctor" was also released under the name of David Seville and the Chipmunks and re-recorded under the name Alvin and the Chipmunks. The technique was also imitated by other recording artists, such as Sheb Wooley in "The Purple People Eater". The Big Bopper parodied both songs on "The Purple People Eater Meets the Witch Doctor"; this song was originally released as a single, but it was its flip side "Chantilly Lace" that became the hit.

== Chart performance ==
"Witch Doctor" peaked at No. 1 on the Billboard Top 100, the predecessor to the Billboard Hot 100. The single was considered a major surprise hit on the chart, where it became Ross Bagdasarian and Liberty Records' first No. 1 single, and stayed in the position for three weeks. The single also peaked at No. 1 on the Billboard R&B chart even though it is not a R&B song – this is due to the R&B chart being a trade category at the time, reflecting the popularity of the song with African-American radio stations and customers. The single had sold 1.4 million copies in the United States by December 1958. Billboard ranked it as the No. 4 song for 1958.

=== Charts ===
Chart (1958)	Peak position
Canada (CHUM Hit Parade)	1
UK Singles (Official Charts)	11
US Top 100 Sides (Billboard)	1
US Billboard Rhythm & Blues Records	1
US Cash Box Top 100	1

== Alvin and the Chipmunks versions ==
The song has gained further popularity due to multiple covers performed by Alvin and the Chipmunks, another Ross Bagdasarian creation. The first was for their 1960 album Sing Again with The Chipmunks, which would be released as a single and adapted into a musical segment in The Alvin Show, which in turn was included on the eponymous soundtrack of the animated series. In 1983, they performed the song on the Alvin and the Chipmunks episode "The Chipmunk Story" and for their 1984 album Songs from our TV Shows. The Chipmunk Adventure also features the song, this time sung by Mrs. Miller. The song was used for the opening of the 1990 TV special Rockin' Through the Decades, with each verse being sung by one of the Chipmunks in the style of a different artist.

In 2007, a DeeTown remix cover featuring Chris Classic was recorded for the live-action/CGI film Alvin and the Chipmunks. This version reached No. 62 on the Billboard Hot 100 in January 2008.

== Cartoons version ==
"Witch Doctor"

Single by Cartoons

from the album Toonage
- Released: October 26, 1998
- Length: 3:06
- Label: FLEX; EMI
- Songwriter: Ross Bagdasarian
- Producers: Sponge; Toonie; Michael Pfundheller

Cartoons singles chronology
"DooDah" (1998)	"Witch Doctor" (1998)	"Yoko" (1998)

Music video
- "Witch Doctor" on YouTube

The Danish band Cartoons covered "Witch Doctor" for their 1998 debut album, Toonage. Released on October 26, 1998, their version charted in Europe, reaching the top 40 in several countries and peaking at No. 2 on the UK Singles Chart in March 1999.

=== Track listing ===
CD single
No.	Title	Length
1.	"Witch Doctor" (radio mix)	3:06
2.	"Witch Doctor" (extended mix)	4:14
3.	"Witch Doctor" (Out of Africa remix)	5:09

=== Charts ===
==== Weekly charts ====
Chart (1998–1999)	Peak position
Belgium (Ultratop 50 Flanders)	9
Europe (Eurochart Hot 100)	11
France (SNEP)	22
Germany (GfK)	68
Ireland (IRMA)	2
Netherlands (Dutch Top 40)	12
Netherlands (Single Top 100)	12
New Zealand (Recorded Music NZ)	31
Scottish Singles Sales (Official Charts)	2
Sweden (Sverigetopplistan)	13
UK Singles (Official Charts)	2

==== Year-end charts ====
Chart (1999)	Position
Belgium (Ultratop 50 Flanders)	74
Europe (Eurochart Hot 100)	98
Netherlands (Dutch Top 40)	87
Netherlands (Single Top 100)	51
UK Singles (OCC)	27

=== Certifications ===
Region	Certification	Certified units/sales
New Zealand (RMNZ)	Gold	15,000^{‡}
United Kingdom (BPI)	Platinum	600,000^{‡}
^{‡} Sales+streaming figures based on certification alone.

=== Release history ===
Region	Date	Format(s)	Label(s)	Ref.
Denmark	October 26, 1998	CD	FLEX; EMI	
United Kingdom	March 22, 1999	CD; cassette	FLEX; EMI	

== Other versions ==
- English trombonist and singer Don Lang recorded a version similar to Ross Bagdasarian's recording. This cover reached No. 5 on the UK chart in June 1958.
- Mexican actor and comedian Manuel "El Loco" Valdés performed a Spanish version of the song for the 1959 film Two Ghosts and a Girl, where he plays various stereotypical roles of African, German, Spanish, Russian and Chinese people. The performance was very well received by the Mexican public and is considered a classic of Mexican comedy. Manuel Valdés would reinterpret the song in other productions throughout his career, including the 2007 animated film La Leyenda de la Nahuala.
- New wave band Devo recorded a version for the soundtrack of The Rugrats Movie. The verses were changed to be about how monkeys have more fun than humans.
