= Calgary Boys' Choir =

Canadian choir

The Calgary Boys' Choir is a choir for boys in Calgary, Alberta, Canada. The choir was founded with 20 members in 1973 by Douglas Parnham, who wanted to "provide a vehicle for young boys to develop their vocal and musical talents and at the same provide the community with another dimension of education and entertainment." Throughout its history, the boys have performed in several different countries, for royalty and with internationally known performers such as Metropolitan Opera baritone Allan Monk, Gordon Gietz, lyric tenor Mark DuBois, the Canadian Brass, Natalie Cole, David Foster, Kenny Loggins, and José Carreras. Past directors include Gerald Wirth, the current artistic director of the Vienna Boys' Choir; Tyrone Paterson, Canadian opera conductor (approximately 1985–1987); Peter Togni, Canadian composer; and Jean-Louis Barbier. Distinguished alumni include Gordon Gietz, actor and Heebee-jeebees member Jonathan Love, and New York-based actor/singer Alex Birnie.

The current artistic director of the Calgary Boys' Choir is Kathryn Berko.

== Groupings of singers ==
The Calgary Boys' Choir's flagship choir is the Concert Choir, which is for boys in Grades 5 and up, including boys whose voices have changed. The Concert Choir was previously known as Gentlemen's Choir and Touring Choir. Boys sing in multiple parts and learn music in various languages and music styles. The Concert Choir collaborates often with other community partners and will also go on tour.

The Intermediate Choir, previously known as the Masters Choir and Performing Choir, is for boys in Grades 2 through 5. This choir level was created to develop talent and prepare boys for the Gentlemen's Choir. Boys in the Intermediate Choir continue to work on choral tone and matching vowels, but will also experiment with singing in two parts. They also sing in a language other than English, and through collaboration with the Young Singers, will be exposed to leadership and mentorship skills.

Over the years, the Calgary Boys' Choir has offered a Young Singers program, which accepted boys as young as age six. Currently, the Young Singers accepts boys as young as kindergarten. Members of the Young Singers work on choral tone and matching vowels by singing in unison. They sing folksongs in English with limited words so they can focus on matching pitch and tone, and working together as a group. They also tend to move and interact with each other through games and activity.

In its first year, the Calgary Boys' Choir recorded 14 boys but grew to around 100 by 1991. At times throughout its history, the Calgary Boys' Choir has included an Early Childhood Music (ECM) division for preschool-aged boys and girls, an Alumni Choir for boys with changed voices, and was briefly affiliated with the Calgary Girls Choir as well as a choral music school.

== History ==
- 1973: Choir founded by Douglas Parnham in Calgary, Alberta, Canada.
- 1976–1977: Touring Choir tours Vancouver, British Columbia and vicinity; record recorded and released: Volume I.
- 1977–1978: Touring Choir tours England and Wales.
- 1978–1979: Members of choir featured in Tosca production of Southern Alberta Opera Association.
- 1979–1980: Touring Choir tours Hawaii, USA, where July 1 was proclaimed "Calgary Boys' Choir Day" by the mayor of Honolulu.
- 1980–1981: Calgary Boys' Choir declared Official Goodwill Ambassadors by the City of Calgary.
- 1981–1982: Touring Choir tours England, Scotland, and Wales, releases Christmas With the Calgary Boys Choir record.
- 1982–1983: Touring Choir tours Central Alberta, Douglas Parnham receives Alberta Government Achievement Award for exceptional achievement in the arts.
- 1983–1984: Touring Choir tours Ottawa, Montreal, Quebec City, Saint John, New Brunswick, Sackville, New Brunswick, Charlottetown, and Halifax.
- 1984–1985: Touring Choir tours Central Alberta.
- 1985: Boys' Choir participates in a performance of Mahler's Symphony No. 8 to officially open the Jack Singer Concert Hall.
- 1985–1986: Touring Choir tours Montana, Idaho, Washington, and British Columbia with the Columbia Artists and Overture Concerts; performs with lyric tenor Mark DuBois.
- 1986: Boys' Choir releases Pot Pourri record.
- 1986: Members of the Touring Choir appear in Calgary Opera's production of La bohème by Giacomo Puccini.
- 1986–1987: Touring Choir tours Montana and Saskatchewan, England and Wales.
- 1987: Members of the Touring Choir appear in Calgary Opera's production of Tosca by Giacomo Puccini.
- 1988: Boys' Choir performs as part of the opening ceremonies for the Calgary 1988 Winter Olympics.
- 1988: Members of the Touring Choir appear in Calgary Opera's production of Carmèn by Georges Bizet.
- 1989: Touring Choir tours Finland, Sweden and the USSR.
- 1991: Douglas Parnham takes the Touring Choir to Japan in his last tour as artistic director; Gerald Wirth appointed artistic director; Alumni Chorus created for boys with changed voices.
- 1992: Touring Choir travels to Florida to participate in the Florida International Boychoir Festival.
- 1992: Boys' Choir releases Jubilate record, featuring the Touring Choir and Alumni Chorus.
- 1993: Boys' Choir celebrates its 20th anniversary.
- 1995: Touring Choir and Alumni Chorus tour to Australia.
- 1998: Jean-Louis Barbier hired as artistic director.
- 2000: Arlie Langager hired as artistic director.
- 2004: Paul Grindlay hired as artistic director. Touring Choir travels to the Czech Republic and Vienna, Austria.
- 2007: Svetlana Lysogor hired as artistic director.
- 2007: Touring Choir travels to France and Spain.
- 2009: Touring Choir travels to New York City.
- 2010: Paul Grindlay rehired as artistic director; choir rejoins the family of Mount Royal University Conservatory choirs.
- 2011: Touring Choir travels to Arizona to appear in the third international Boys and Mens Choral Festival.
- 2013: Boys' Choir celebrates its 40th anniversary
- 2013: Touring Choir travels to England
- 2017: Boys' Choir leaves family of Mount Royal University Conservatory choirs.
- 2018: Gentlemen's Choir travels to France during the summer.
- 2018–2019: Boys' Choir celebrates 45 years of operation.
- 2019–2020: Kathryn Berko hired as Artistic Director
- 2022: Concert Choir travels to Ottawa and Montreal
- 2023–2024: Calgary Boys' Choir 50th Anniversary Season and Celebration Concert (May 2024)
