= Dr. Bombay =

Dr. Bombay can refer to:

- Dr. Bombay (character), a character from the TV series Bewitched (1964–1972)
- Jonny Jakobsen, a Swedish artist performing under the name "Dr. Bombay"
