= Tiggy (disambiguation) =

Tiggy may refer to:

- Tiggy (Charlotte Vigel), a Danish musician
- Tiggy Legge-Bourke (1965–), royal nanny
- Tiggy the talking cat, see Talking animal#Cats
- Tig Trager, a fictional Sons of Anarchy character
- Tiggy Wiggy (born 2012), Thoroughbred racehorse
- Tiggy (geometry), the Bowers abbreviation for a truncated great icosahedron
- Tiggy, another name for Tag (game)
- Tiggy, a book by Miss Read
