= No Tengo Dinero =

No Tengo Dinero may refer to:

- "No Tengo Dinero" (Juan Gabriel song), 1971
- "No Tengo Dinero" (Righeira song), 1983
- "No Tengo Dinero" (Los Umbrellos song), 1997
