= Morton Fraser's Harmonica Gang =

British comedy musical group

- Genres: Comedy harmonicists
- Years active: 1946–1980s
- Past members: Morton Fraser, Stan Key, Henry Samuels, Nat Lees, Tony Vincent, Dave King, Gordon Mills, Don Paul, Ronnie Wells, Johnny Stafford, "Tiny" Ross, etc.

Morton Fraser's Harmonica Gang was a British comedy musical group, formed in 1946 by Morton Fraser (born Emmanuel Fish; 3 November 1905 – 10 June 1982).

== History ==
Fraser was born Emmanuel Fish in Leeds, to a naturalised immigrant family of Polish Jews originally named Fisz. In the 1920s, he won an All-American harmonica competition in Philadelphia, and became a renowned solo harmonica player, touring theatres around the world. In the late 1930s he intended to form a harmonica group along the lines of Borrah Minevitch's Harmonica Rascals, but with the onset of the Second World War he joined the Royal Artillery and became a participant in Stars in Battledress shows as a harmonica soloist.

After the end of the war he formed his troupe of harmonica players in 1946. They starred in the 1947 film Morton Fraser and his Harmonica Rascals, later changing "Rascals" to "Gang" to avoid confusion with Minevitch's group. They rapidly became a popular variety act in Britain, playing at the London Palladium on many occasions, and featured in television shows through the 1950s and 1960s. They also recorded for EMI.

The personnel of the group changed over time. In 1950, Fraser himself stopped performing, becoming the group's arranger and manager. The group included, at various times, Stan Key, Henry Samuels, Nat Lees, Dave King, Tony Vincent, Gordon Mills, Don Paul, Ronnie Wells, Johnny Stafford, Reg ‘Johnny’ Farrow and "Tiny" Ross.

Mills, Paul and Wells left in the late 1950s and formed The Viscounts; Mills later became a songwriter and the manager of Tom Jones, among others. Dave King became a successful solo comedian, singer and actor; and Stafford became a popular solo singer and entertainer in the 1960s and 1970s. "Tiny" Ross (born Walter John Ross Skudder, 1910–1994) had dwarfism and was often the focus of the group's comedic antics; he later featured prominently as an actor in the 1981 film Time Bandits. The suggestion in some sources, that gangster Royston Smith was the dwarf member of the group in the 1950s, is not supported elsewhere.

Fraser died in 1982, in Eastbourne, Sussex, aged 76. The group continued for some time thereafter, under the leadership of Tony Vincent, until changing tastes and lack of venues led them to disband.
