= Under the Kilt =

Studio album by Dr. Macdoo
- Released: January 24, 2001
- Genre: Eurodance
- Length: 37:31
- Label: Warner Bros.

Dr. Macdoo chronology
Rice & Curry (1998)	Under the Kilt (2001)	Fiesta (2006)

Singles from Under the Kilt
- 1. "Macahula Dance" Released: 2000; 2. "Under the Kilt" Released: 2000

Under the Kilt is the third studio album by Swedish Eurodance artist Jonny Jakobsen and his first album under the pseudonym Dr. Macdoo. It was released in 2001. The album is best known for the title track "Under the Kilt", for which a music video was produced, and "Macahula Dance", for which a music video was released as bonus content on the original CD release. Both of these tracks were also released as singles. The title track is a parody of Scotland the Brave.

== Track listing ==
1. Intro – 0:36
2. Family Macdoo – 3:11
3. Macahula Dance – 3:03
4. Loch Ness – 3:12
5. Under The Kilt – 3:13
6. Hokey Pokey Man – 3:05
7. Highland Reggae – 3:27
8. Scottish Ghost (Extra Extra) – 3:02
9. Mayday Mayday – 3:13
10. Mad Piper – 3:18
11. Bagpipesong – 2:57
12. (Grandfather) Mac Macdoo – 3:07
13. Outro – 1:36
