= The Viscounts (British band) =

British pop group

- Origin: London, England
- Genre: vocal pop group
- Years active: 1958–1965
- Label: Pye Records
- Spinoff of: Morton Fraser's Harmonica Gang
- Members: Don Paul; Ronnie Wells; Gordon Mills

The Viscounts were a British pop group from London, England. Its members had formerly been part of a TV ensemble called Morton Fraser's Harmonica Gang. They quit the group and formed The Viscounts in late April 1958, playing local shows and eventually attracting the attention of manager Larry Parnes. He got them billed at better venues and signed them to Pye Records in 1960.

Their cover version of Ray Smith's hit single "Rockin' Little Angel" became a hit in Australia, and their cover of "Shortnin' Bread" hit number 16 in November that year in the UK Singles Chart. In addition to recording rock/pop numbers, they also did some trad jazz, covering Paul Whiteman for a compilation album. In 1961, their single cover version of "Who Put the Bomp (in the Bomp, Bomp, Bomp)" reached number 21 in the UK chart, spending ten weeks in the listings. The group toured with Gene Vincent and Eddie Cochran, as well as sharing a stage with The Beatles in 1963 opening for Chris Montez. In 1964, they moved to Columbia Records, but none of their three following singles charted.

Band member Gordon Mills' success as a songwriter soon convinced him to move on, and the group broke up in 1965; soon after, Mills wrote "It's Not Unusual" for Tom Jones. Don Paul became a record producer, and Ronnie Wells went into the restaurant business. Wells died in 2013. Their complete recorded output on Pye Records was reissued on CD in 2001 on Castle Records.

== Members ==
- Don Paul (born Donald Paul Fountain, 2 January 1937, Oldham, Lancashire, England)
- Ronnie Wells (born Ronald Eric Cresswell, 27 August 1939, Farnborough, Hampshire, England - died 22 September 2013)
- Gordon Mills (born Gordon William Mills, 15 May 1935, Madras, British India - died 29 July 1986, Los Angeles, California, US)
