= No Tengo Dinero (Los Umbrellos song) =

1997 single by Los Umbrellos

Single by Los Umbrellos

from the album Flamenco Funk
- Released: 14 May 1997
- Genre: Latin pop
- Length: 3:36
- Label: FLEX (EMI); Virgin
- Songwriters: Manos Hadjidakis; Al Agami; Richie Balmorian; Jay Balmorian
- Producers: Kenneth Bager; Michael Pfundheller; Jan Elhøj; Cutfather & Joe

Los Umbrellos singles chronology
| "No Tengo Dinero" (1997) | "Drive" (1998) |

"No Tengo Dinero" (English: "I Have No Money") is the debut single of Danish musical group Los Umbrellos, considered to be their signature song. It was released by FLEX Records (now part of EMI) on 14 May 1997. Based on the theme of 1960 film Never on Sunday by Greek composer Manos Hatzidakis, the lyrics were written by Jay and Richie Balmorian and group member Al Agami. It was produced by Kenneth Bager, Michael Pfundheller and Jan Elhøj, with additional production handled by Cutfather & Joe.

The song became a top-five hit in Denmark, Italy, New Zealand and Switzerland. In Austria, the song reached number one for 10 weeks, received a platinum certification from IFPI, and was the highest-selling single of 1998. The song also peaked at number 31 on Canada's RPM 100 Hit Tracks chart and number 42 on the US Billboard Hot 100; it stayed on the latter chart for 27 weeks without entering the top 40. As of August 2003, the single had sold 800,000 copies worldwide. Unlike "No Tengo Dinero", the band's following releases enjoyed no chart success, thus Los Umbrellos were named a one hit wonder. In 2017, Billboard magazine ranked "No Tengo Dinero" among "The 100 Greatest Pop Songs of 1997".

== Background ==
In 1995, Jan Elhøj and Anders Hansen, of rap-comedy duo Angry Ass, made a song called "Frikadeller og krebinetter" (Danish for "Meatballs and pork patties") which incorporated the theme of 1960 film Never on Sunday, composed by Manos Hadjidakis. The song was presented to Kenneth Bager, owner of FLEX Records, who immediately saw its potential. Bager sought to find the right people to work on the track. He enlisted Ugandan rapper Al Agami to write the rap lyrics, while songwriters Richie and Jay Balmorian wrote the Spanish and English chorus. Danish singer Shirley arranged the backing vocals for the chorus. Finally, Kenneth Bager, Jan Elhøj, and Michael Pfundheller produced the track. Bager then presented "No Tengo Dinero" to FLEX Records' parent label, EMI, but they were not interested in the song. It was then re-produced by the Danish producers Cutfather and Joe Belmaati (of Cutfather & Joe), and finally EMI agreed to release the song. Before the release of the song, Kenneth Bager wanted to find two female backing singers for the Los Umbrellos project. Michael Pfundheller personally knew dancer Grith Højfeldt, while Mai-Britt Vingsøe was contacted through modelling agency Scandinavian Models. All three members of Los Umbrellos finally met at the cover shooting for the single.

== Chart performance ==
In Denmark, "No Tengo Dinero" peaked at number two on the Danish Singles Chart. It went on to sell 10,000 copies there. It reached number one on the Ö3 Austria Top 40, number two on the New Zealand Singles Chart, number four on the Swiss Singles Chart and number five on the Italian Singles Chart. The song also reached number 33 on the UK Singles Chart and appeared on three US Billboard charts—number 42 on the Hot 100, number 40 on the Mainstream Top 40 and number 27 on the Rhythmic Top 40. As of May 1998, the song had sold 412,000 copies in the United States. As the next Los Umbrellos single, "Easy Come, Easy Go", did not follow the success of "No Tengo Dinero", the band was considered to be a one-hit wonder, and "No Tengo Dinero" their signature song.

== Critical reception ==
In June 2017, Billboard magazine ranked "No Tengo Dinero" number 96 in their list of "The 100 Greatest Pop Songs of 1997". Andrew Unterberger wrote, "About a year and change before Ricky Martin took over in earnest, Danish trio Los Umbrellos delivered a Latin Pop explosion as imagined by McG; all beach bunnies, gaudy primary colors and kitschy Spanglish cheese. Probably for the best that America held out for the real(er) thing, though the list of songs with choruses in any language catchier than "No Tengo Dinero" is muy bajo."

== Music video ==
The accompanying music video for "No Tengo Dinero" was filmed at the Safari Inn motel in Burbank, California. The video featured a guest appearance of adult film actor Ron Jeremy.

== Track listings ==
- Danish CD single
1. "No Tengo Dinero" (C & J radio mix)
2. "No Tengo Dinero" (club mix)
3. "No Tengo Dinero" (Pumpin Dolls remix)
4. "No Tengo Dinero" (Pumpin Fiesta Loca)
- European and Japanese CD single
1. "No Tengo Dinero" (Flex Mucho mix) – 3:36
2. "Theme from Los Umbrellos" – 3:20
3. "No Tengo Dinero" (extended Mucho mix) – 4:13
- European maxi-CD single
1. "No Tengo Dinero" (C & J radio mix) – 3:36
2. "No Tengo Dinero" (club mix) – 6:59
3. "No Tengo Dinero" (C & J extended mix) – 4:13
- UK CD and cassette single
1. "No Tengo Dinero" (C & J radio mix) – 3:36
2. "No Tengo Dinero" (club mix) – 6:59
3. "No Tengo Dinero" (Pumpin Dolls mix) – 4:03
- US maxi-CD single
1. "No Tengo Dinero" (C & J mix) – 3:36
2. "Road to Carlos" – 4:30
3. "Femme Fatale" – 5:23
4. "Hasta La Fuego" – 3:03
- US CD and cassette single
1. "No Tengo Dinero" (Flex Mucho mix) – 3:36
2. "No Tengo Dinero" (extended Mucho mix) – 4:13
3. "Theme from Los Umbrellos" – 3:20
- US 7-inch single

A. "No Tengo Dinero" (Flex Mucho mix) – 3:36
B. "Hasta La Fuego" – 3:03

- Australian CD single
1. "No Tengo Dinero" (radio edit)
2. "No Tengo Dinero" (C & J mix)
3. "No Tengo Dinero" (club mix)
4. "No Tengo Dinero" (C & J extended mix)

== Credits and personnel ==
Credits are adapted from CD single liner notes.

- Manos Hadjidakis – songwriter
- Al Agami – songwriter
- Richie Balmorian – songwriter
- Jay Balmorian – songwriter
- Kenneth Bager – recording, production, arrangement, executive producer
- Michael Pfundheller – recording, production, arrangement, mastering
- Jan Elhøj – recording, production, arrangement
- Cutfather & Joe – remix, additional production
- Mads Nilsson – engineer
- Lars Vissing – trumpet

== Charts ==
=== Weekly charts ===
Weekly chart performance for "No Tengo Dinero"
| Chart (1997–1998) | Peak position |
|---|---|
| Austria (Ö3 Austria Top 40) | 1 |
| Belgium (Ultratip Bubbling Under Flanders) | 18 |
| Canada Top Singles (RPM) | 31 |
| Canada Adult Contemporary (RPM) | 42 |
| Canada Dance/Urban (RPM) | 25 |
| Denmark (Tracklisten) | 2 |
| Europe (Eurochart Hot 100) | 14 |
| Germany (GfK) | 20 |
| Iceland (Íslenski Listinn Topp 40) | 24 |
| Italy (FIMI) | 4 |
| Italy (Musica e dischi) | 5 |
| Italy Airplay (Music & Media) | 6 |
| Netherlands (Dutch Top 40) | 14 |
| Netherlands (Single Top 100) | 22 |
| New Zealand (Recorded Music NZ) | 2 |
| Scottish Singles Sales (Official Charts) | 35 |
| Switzerland (Schweizer Hitparade) | 3 |
| UK Singles (Official Charts) | 33 |
| US Billboard Hot 100 | 42 |
| US Mainstream Top 40 (Billboard) | 40 |
| US Rhythmic Top 40 (Billboard) | 27 |

=== Year-end charts ===
Annual chart rankings for "No Tengo Dinero"
| Chart (1997) | Position |
|---|---|
| Romania (Romanian Top 100) | 81 |

| Chart (1998) | Position |
|---|---|
| Austria (Ö3 Austria Top 40) | 1 |
| Europe (Eurochart Hot 100) | 58 |
| Europe Border Breakers (Music & Media) | 23 |
| Germany (Media Control) | 86 |
| Netherlands (Dutch Top 40) | 149 |
| New Zealand (RIANZ) | 8 |
| Switzerland (Schweizer Hitparade) | 30 |
| US Rhythmic Top 40 (Billboard) | 85 |

=== Decade-end charts ===
| Chart (1990–1999) | Rank |
|---|---|
| Austria (Ö3 Austria Top 40) | 38 |

== Certifications and sales ==
Certifications and sales for "No Tengo Dinero"
| Region | Certification | Certified units/sales |
|---|---|---|
| Austria (IFPI Austria) | Platinum | 50,000^{*} |
| Denmark | — | 10,000 |
| New Zealand (RMNZ) | Platinum | 10,000^{*} |
| United States | — | 412,000 |
Summaries
| Worldwide | — | 800,000 |
^{*} Sales figures based on certification alone.

== Release history ==
Street dates for "No Tengo Dinero"
| Region | Date | Format(s) | Label(s) | Ref. |
|---|---|---|---|---|
| Denmark | 14 May 1997 | CD | FLEX | |
| United States | 24 June 1997 | Rhythmic contemporary; contemporary hit radio | FLEX; EMI | |
| Japan | 9 July 1997 | CD | EMI Japan | |
| United Kingdom | 14 September 1998 | CD; cassette | FLEX; Virgin | |
