= Go to Blazes (1962 film) =

1962 British film by Michael Truman

- Directed by: Michael Truman
- Written by: Patrick Campbell; Vivienne Knight
- Produced by: Kenneth Harper
- Starring: Dave King; Robert Morley; Daniel Massey; Dennis Price
- Cinematography: Erwin Hillier
- Edited by: Richard Best
- Music by: John Addison
- Production company: Associated British Picture Corporation
- Distributed by: Warner-Pathé Distributors
- Release date: April 1962
- Running time: 80 minutes
- Country: United Kingdom
- Language: English

Go to Blazes is a 1962 British comedy film directed by Michael Truman and starring Dave King, Robert Morley, Norman Rossington, Daniel Massey, Dennis Price, Maggie Smith, and David Lodge. It also features Arthur Lowe and John Le Mesurier, both later to star in Dad's Army.

== Plot ==
Somewhere in London a refined gent in a bowler hat walks along the road with flowers and chocolates, seemingly on his way to a date. He stops at a jeweller's window and looks at the rings. Suddenly he throws the box (containing a brick) through the window, and grabs the jewels. A Citroen DS rushes up and he gets inside to join his two friends. The police give chase and they are doing well until stopped at a junction for a fire engine to pass. They are caught and sent to Wormwood Scrubs.

The trio decide that a fire engine is the least likely form of transport to be delayed by traffic. Following release, the incompetent criminals go to a fire engine salesroom where the salesman extols the virtues of the various machines. However, they cannot afford £5000 for a new engine and go to a scrap yard to buy an old one.

They then steal a well-maintained 1930s fire engine, stored in a remote fire station, and swap it for their scrap engine of the same type, burning down the fire station to hide the theft, leaving the burnt out scrapper in the debris. Having parked their engine in a big shed in Smithfield, they identify a jeweller to rob on a corner near Berkeley Square, and get firemen's uniforms in a costume shop.

Testing their theory, their first attempt to rob the jeweller's shop ends in disaster. While Harry is dodging the police, he escapes into a show of wedding dresses, where he meets the French owner Chantal, and pretends he is the son of Lady Hamilton, one of her rich clients. He arranges a dinner date with her. Meanwhile, Bernard and Alfie in the fire engine are flagged down by a desperate home-owner, whose basement flat is flooding and has mistaken them for the real fire brigade. Their attempts to pump out the flat make matters worse, because they only add water, and they flee the scene with hoses trailing behind them when the real fire engine arrives.

Failure only makes them more determined, and they decide they need to be more professional so they can pass as trained firemen, their obvious incompetence at the flooded flat having ruined their plans. An acquaintance, (mad professor) "Arson Eddie", is unwilling to help them because he is devoted to arson – the creation of the "sacred flame". He knows all there is to know about starting fires, but next to nothing about putting them out.

A chance conversation heard outside a fire station puts them onto Withers, a fire chief dismissed from the service for arson, theft and conduct unbecoming. He is persuaded to train them in exchange for a share in the proceeds of a bank job.

Chantal's salon is next to a bank and they decide a fire in her basement would be a suitable ruse to put them conveniently close to the bank. They return to Arson Eddie for a fire-raising scheme. Chantal has a meeting with her boss, Madame Colette, who reveals the business is in financial difficulty but the dress collection is insured for £20,000. "Blimey" she says, revealing her true cockney accent, before reverting to her faux French. Arson Eddie visits the dress shop, claiming to be a potential client, "Mr Mountbatten". He is enchanted by the women and is continually thwarted in his attempts to start a fire. However, Madame Colette sets fire to the curtains as part of her own plan.

The bank robbery takes place from the basement but the fire above is very real and the real fire brigade arrives. The thieves escape with a fire hose stuffed with banknotes. Colette and Chantal are surprised when they spot Harry and "Mr Mountbatten" on the fire engine in their firemen's uniforms. A policeman overhears and gives chase.

As the robbers make their getaway, they are flagged down by two young girls whose treehouse is on fire, and once more they are required to join in the fighting of a real fire. Undeterred, well equipped and, above all, well trained, they join in.

Unfortunately for them, Alfie attaches the wrong hose to the pump and covers the scene of the fire with the stolen money instead of water.

The film ends with the crooks sitting in the "Black Maria" on their way to their next stint in prison. In the window behind the van, the Queen, in a royal limousine, can be seen. Bernard remarks that he has just had another idea for the perfect getaway vehicle.

== Cast ==
- Dave King as Bernard
- Robert Morley as Arson Eddie
- Daniel Massey as Harry
- Dennis Price as Withers
- Coral Browne as Colette
- Norman Rossington as Alfie
- Maggie Smith as Chantal
- Miles Malleson as salesman
- Wilfrid Lawson as scrap dealer
- David Lodge as Sergeant
- John Welsh as Chief Fire Officer
- Finlay Currie as Judge
- James Hayter as pipe smoker
- Derek Nimmo as fish fancier
- John Glyn-Jones as Fire Chief
- Eynon Evans as Mayor
- Diane Clare as girl lover
- Dudley Sutton as boy lover
- John Le Mesurier as fisherman
- John Warwick as fireman
- Arthur Lowe as Warder

== Critical reception ==
The Monthly Film Bulletin wrote: "Given the Englishman's traditional reverence for fire-engines (almost as intense as his worship of obsolete trains) and a script more good-humoured than astringent, the comedy could hardly shape up as anything more striking than an Ealing imitation. But it is surprisingly appealing in a mild, leisurely fashion. The humour, though quaint, isn't forced; and the three engaging crooks are played with disciplined ease by Dave King, Daniel Massey and Norman Rossington, which makes the raving eccentricity of Robert Morley and Miles Malleson that much funnier. The bank raid, too, is carried off with a nice feeling for farcical fantasy."

Leslie Halliwell said: "Mild comedy ruined by widescreen."

The Radio Times Guide to Films gave the film 2/5 stars, writing: "This substandard comedy caper is now mainly of interest for providing Maggie Smith with her second screen role (receiving her second screen credit in her third screen role). The story of some clottish crooks who train themselves up as firemen in order to use the engine they've bought as a getaway vehicle is both derivative and dull. Dave King and Daniel Massey generate few comic sparks, but there's a fun cameo from Robert Morley as an obliging arsonist."
