= The Banjo (Gottschalk) =

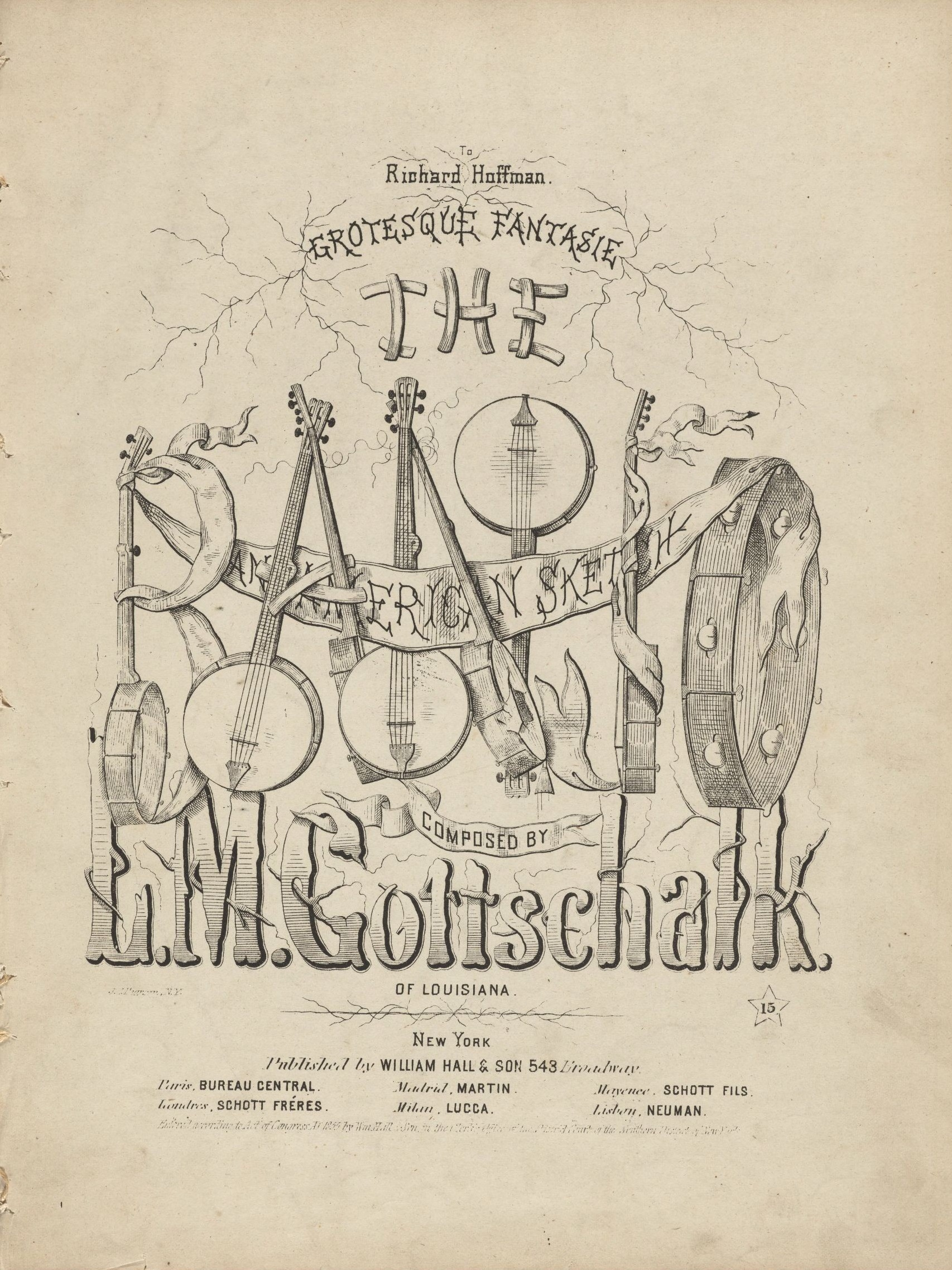
The Banjo, 1855 sheet music cover published by William Hall & Son.

The Banjo, Op. 15, is a composition for piano by the American composer Louis Moreau Gottschalk. Composed in 1853, it is one of Gottschalk's best-known works. The piece features imitations of mid-nineteenth-century African-American banjo techniques and includes demonstrations of techniques, such as up-picking and strumming, which are not found in other sources from the period.

== History ==
During the summer of 1853, Gottschalk undertook several compositions; among them was the first version of The Banjo. After taking the piece through a major overhaul, Gottschalk submitted it for publication in 1854 as his Opus 15.

The accuracy of Gottschalk's banjo imitations in the piece makes it a unique record of the sound of pre-Civil War African-American banjo playing, and it contains evidence of techniques not found in other sources, including combinations of "downstroking" and "up-picking" found in West African plucked lute performance. This unusual accuracy has enabled at least one modern banjo player to recreate the banjo music that Gottschalk transcribed, which invited speculation that Gottschalk may have taken his banjo imitations from actual transcription of an unnamed African-American banjo player. Unlike most banjo music in the popular minstrel shows of the time that more closely followed the melody of dance music, most of "The Banjo" consists of variations of a repeating phrase as is done by musicians in the Senegambia region in West Africa, the source for the banjo's ancestors.

== Musical analysis ==
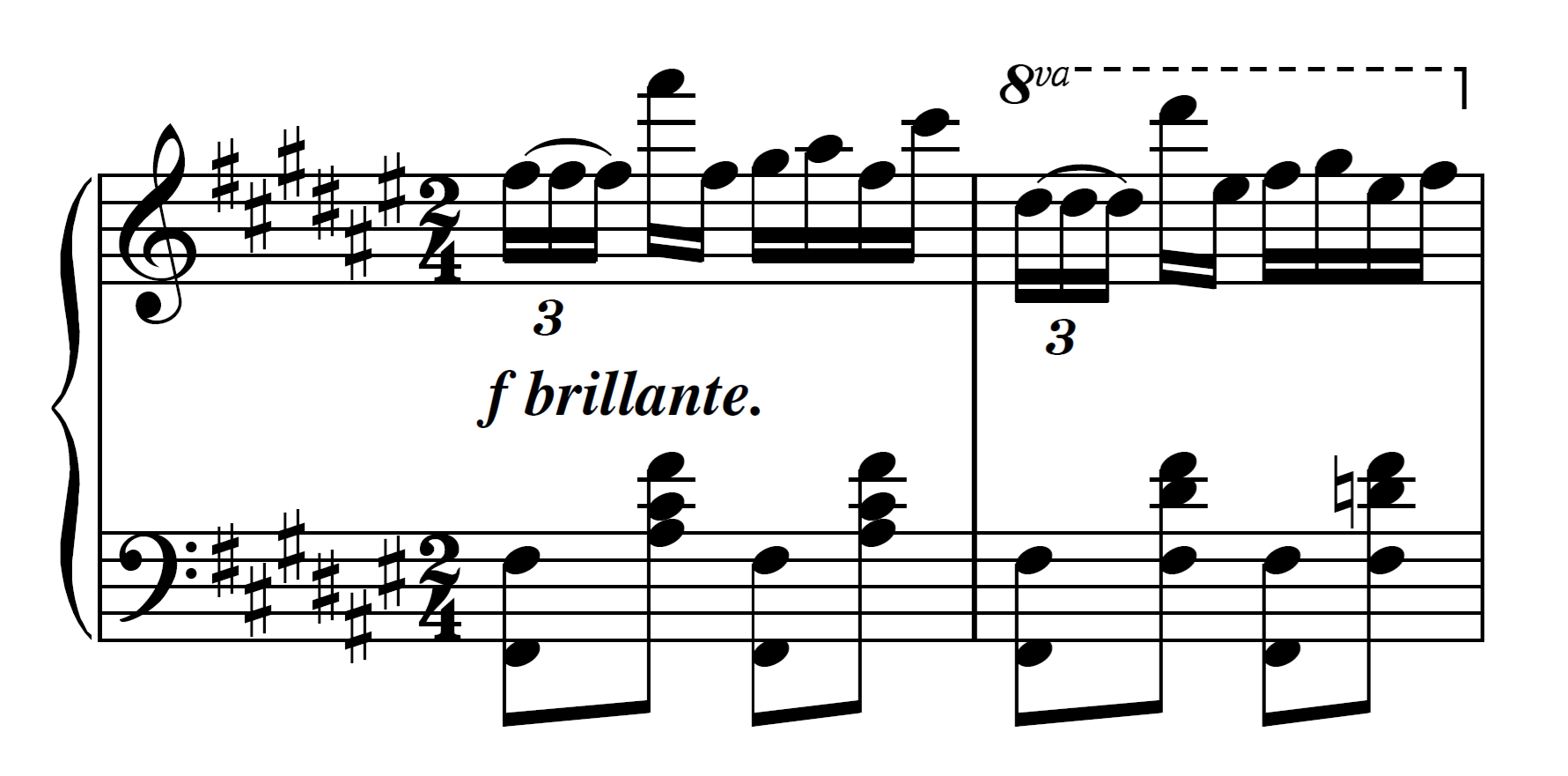
One of the difficult passages in The Banjo

The Banjo, written in two-four time in the key of F♯ major, begins with a variant of the ending theme doubled in octaves. Then the piece explores a strikingly West African-style series of variations on a basic repeating phrase. When the melody from the introduction comes back in, it barely has time to establish itself before a difficult passage in sixteenths takes over. Thundering octaves then take the melody back to the introduction and the whole thing is repeated.

Throughout the piece the melodies develop until Gottschalk brings the piece to an end with a pair of variations, containing Stephen Foster's "Camptown Races".

== Performances ==
The Banjo was first performed in March 1855 by Gottschalk himself. Since then it has become a favorite encore of piano virtuosi around the world. French pianist Cyprien Katsaris created his own transcription of the piece, during performances he plays several wrong notes, adding to the humour of the piece.
