= Rice & Curry =

1998 studio album by Dr. Bombay

Studio album by Dr. Bombay
- Released: 26 October 1998
- Genre: Eurodance
- Length: 35:17
- Label: WEA
- Producers: Robert Uhlmann; Robin Rex; Dea'n

Dr. Bombay chronology
Rice & Curry (1998)	Under the Kilt (2001)

Singles from Rice & Curry
- 1. "Calcutta (Taxi Taxi Taxi)" Released: April 1998; 2. "S.O.S. (The Tiger Took My Family)" Released: June 1, 1998; 3. "Rice & Curry" Released: November 1998; 4. "Girlie Girlie" Released: January 19, 1999; 5. "Indy Dancing" Released: February 1999

Rice & Curry is the first studio album by Swedish bubblegum artist Jonny Jakobsen under his pseudonym Dr. Bombay, released in 1998. The album was the subject of mild controversy upon its release, prompted by a negative reaction to its faux-ethnic themes by the Indian government but no legal action was ever pursued. Two of its tracks have been featured in the Beatmania IIDX series of video games and one is featured in the 2000 edition of Samba de Amigo.

== Track listing ==
Rice & Curry – Standard edition
No.	Title	Writer(s)	Length
1.	"Intro"		0:42
2.	"Dr. Boom-Bombay"	Robert Uhlmann; Robin Rex; Dea'n	3:22
3.	"Calcutta (Taxi Taxi Taxi)"	Uhlmann; Cesar Zamini	3:20
4.	"Rice & Curry"	Uhlmann; Rex	3:13
5.	"Safari"	Uhlmann; Rex	3:22
6.	"S.O.S. (The Tiger Took My Family)"	Uhlmann; Zamini	3:26
7.	"Holabaloo"	Uhlmann; Rex; Dea'n	3:04
8.	"Shaky Snake"	Uhlmann; Rex; Dea'n	3:04
9.	"Girlie Girlie"	Uhlmann; Rex; Dea'n	3:10
10.	"My Sitar"	Uhlmann; Rex	3:04
11.	"Indy Dancing"	Zamini	3:17
12.	"Outro"		2:13
Total length:			35:17

== Charts ==
Weekly chart performance for Rice & Curry
Chart (1998–1999)	Peak position
European Albums (Music & Media)	12
Finnish Albums (Suomen virallinen lista)	2
Norwegian Albums (VG-lista)	2
Swedish Albums (Sverigetopplistan)	1

== Certifications and sales ==
Certifications and sales for Rice & Curry
Region	Certification	Certified units/sales
Finland (Musiikkituottajat)	Gold	45,879
Norway (IFPI Norway)	Platinum	50,000^{*}
Sweden (GLF)	3× Platinum	240,000^{^}
^{*} Sales figures based on certification alone.^{^} Shipments figures based on certification alone.

== See also ==
- List of number-one singles and albums in Sweden
