= World Wild =

Studio album by Carlito
- Released: September 26, 2007
- Genre: Eurodance, mariachi
- Length: 43:50
- Label: Warner Bros., Dreamusic Inc.

Carlito chronology
Fiesta (2006)	World Wild (2007)	The Hits (2007)

World Wild is the fifth studio album by Swedish Eurodance artist Jonny Jakobsen, released in 2007. The album was released as a successor to Fiesta, another Carlito album. Carlito is so far the only one of Jakobsen's fictional identities to be associated with more than one studio album without any change in style. According to the official Carlito website, the decision to release a successor to Fiesta was prompted by its outstanding success in Japan.

== Track listing ==
1. Russkij Pusskij – 3:05
2. Sukiyaki Teriyaki – 3:05
3. Be My Pharaoh – 2:58
4. Americo – 3:28
5. Africa – 3:26
6. All Around The World – 3:36
7. Bolero – 3:12
8. Jamaica – 3:35
9. Crazy Carlito – 2:56
10. Final Call – 2:54
11. Holiday – 3:33
12. Backpack Girl – 3:27
13. Samba De Janeiro – 3:12
14. Home Sweet Home – 2:40
