= Dave King (actor) =

English comedian, actor, and vocalist (1929–2002)

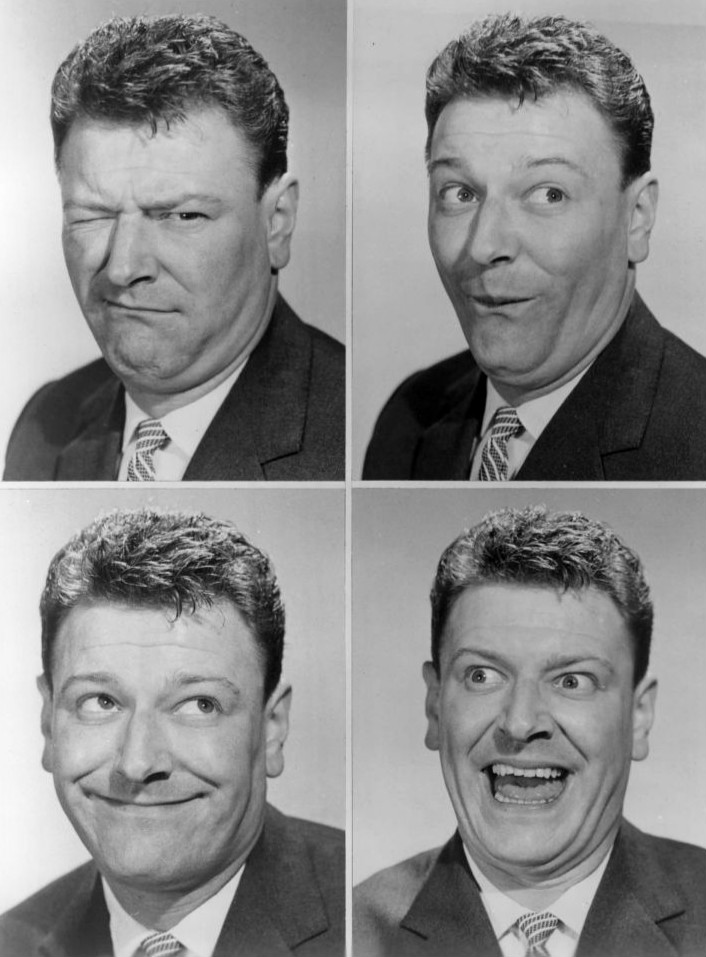
- Photo montage of King from a 1959 Kraft Music Hall appearance
- Born: David Kingshott; 23 June 1929; Twickenham, Middlesex, England
- Died: 15 April 2002 (aged 72); Swindon, Wiltshire, England
- Occupations: Comedian, singer, actor
- Years active: 1955–1990s

Dave King (born David Albert Kingshott; 23 June 1929 – 15 April 2002) was an English comedian, actor and vocalist of popular songs. He is remembered for screen roles such as the corrupt policeman Parky in the British gangster film The Long Good Friday (1980) and Clifford Duckworth in the soap opera Coronation Street.

== Life and career ==
Born in Twickenham, Middlesex, England, King left school aged 12 and joined Morton Fraser's Harmonica Gang in his teens. He did his National Service in the RAF and was in the unit's repertory company. On being demobilised, he returned to variety and later became a solo act as a comedy impressionist in 1952. A television appearance on Easter Music Hall occurred in April 1954. Prior to his TV appearances he had a regular weekly radio show. It was for this radio show that Sid Green and Dick Hills first became his scriptwriters. At the time Hills was still a Form Master at Haberdashers Aske's, and when King got his regular TV show they both gave up their jobs to become full time scriptwriters. led to his compering the monthly BBC-TV series Showcase beginning on January 24, 1955 He was given a monthly series on the BBC starting on 15 October 1955. The next year he turned to singing, while continuing to perform on television. During the seaside summer season of 1956 he performed at the Winter Gardens in Blackpool. He starred in The Dave King Show. During the 1950s he also starred in the same show alongside Shani Wallis. In 1958, King moved to ITV with The Dave King Show which was song, dance and comedy with famous guests of the day.

King scored four hits on the UK Singles Chart in the middle of the 1950s. The biggest were "Memories Are Made of This (No. 5, 1956) and "You Can't Be True to Two" (No. 11, 1956), both of which featured a backing group called the Keynotes. He also charted with "Christmas and You" (No. 23, 1956) and "The Story of My Life" (No. 20, 1958). He appeared on Decca Records' All Star Hit Parade charity record in 1956 along with other major Decca artists Dickie Valentine, Joan Regan, Winifred Atwell, Lita Roza and David Whitfield. That record charted at No. 2 in the UK Singles Chart.

In 1959, he went to the United States and hosted the country's high-profile Kraft Music Hall on 19 occasions, but otherwise had limited success despite Mel Brooks joining his regular writers Sid Green and Dick Hills. On returning to the United Kingdom, he found that the public's taste in comedy had changed. Dave's Kingdom ran on ITV in 1964, again made by ATV, but was less successful than King's earlier TV work. King became a straight actor with some success, starring in the films Pirates of Tortuga (1961), Go to Blazes (1962), The Road to Hong Kong (1962), Strange Bedfellows (1965), Up the Chastity Belt (1971), The Ritz (1976), The Golden Lady (1979), Cuba (1979), The Long Good Friday (1980), Warren Beatty's Reds (1981) and Revolution (1985). He also appeared in a number of TV series including Hazell (1978), Pennies From Heaven (1978), Minder (episode: "Gunfight at the OK Laundrette", 1979), Shoestring (episode: "The Teddy Bears' Nightmare", 1980).

King appeared in three of the UK's most hard-hitting police series, The Sweeney, The Professionals and Target. His appearance in The Sweeney saw him play Arnold Drake, the leader of a gang of armed robbers in the episode: "Pay Off" (1976).In Target, episode "A Good And Faithful Woman (1978)," King appeared as Raymond Blake, a career criminal who returns to the UK in order to recoup the proceeds of a robbery. Whilst in The Professionals he appeared in the role of organised crime lord Harry Walter, the mastermind of a silver bullion robbery in the episode "Hijack" (1980).

Further television appearances included the Rumpole of the Bailey episode "Rumpole and the Blind Tasting" (1987) and as Aidensfield Station Master Roy Hutton in Heartbeat (episode: "Unfinished Business", 1995). The closing scene of the episode features King's character standing on the platform of Aidensfield Station while "Memories Are Made of This" plays in the background.

In the theatre, he appeared in Arsenic and Old Lace, playing Mortimer Brewster, and in Teeth 'n' Smiles (1975/6).

He married Jean Hart in 1955, and they had two daughters, Cheyenne and Kiowa. They lived in South Cerney in Gloucestershire. His hobbies included model railways and American folklore.

King died in Swindon, Wiltshire, on 15 April 2002, aged 72.

== Filmography ==
Year	Title	Role	Notes
1961	Pirates of Tortuga	Pee Wee	
1962	The Road to Hong Kong	Mr. Ahso - Chinese Restaurant Owner	Uncredited
1962	Go to Blazes	Bernard	
1965	Strange Bedfellows	Toni's Taxi Driver	
1970	Up the Chastity Belt	Landlord of the Blue Boar	
1976	The Ritz	Abe	
1979	Cuba	Miss Wonderly's Press Agent	
1979	The Golden Lady	Dietmar Schuster	
1979	Minder	Alfie	
1980	The Long Good Friday	Parky	
1981	Reds	Allan Benson	
1983	Play for Today ('Last Love')	Jack Ives	Series 13, episode 9 (co-written by Reg Gadney - (co-starring Elizabeth Sellars)
1985	Revolution	Mr. McConnahay	
1986	Bleak House (1985 TV serial)	Sgt. George	
1989	Rude Awakening	Hippy on Street	
