= Ring A Ling (Tiggy song) =

Single by Tiggy
- Released: 1996
- Genre: Eurodance
- Label: Flex/EMI
- Songwriter: CMN Nielsen/Larsen/Carlsen
- Producers: Hartmann & Langhoff

"Ring A Ling" is a 1996 song by Tiggy, which was a number-one hit in Denmark in 1997. The song was written by the "CMN" team, Christian Møller Nielsen, Heidi Lykke Larsen and Henrik Carlsen and produced by Hartmann & Langhoff, who had worked with Aqua and Me & My and other Scandinavian bubblegum dance groups. "Ring A Ling" went to No. 1 on the official single sales list after only eight days of release, then went platinum in less than a month and stayed at No. 1 for 8 weeks. It was translated to Chinese and covered by Taiwanese singer Yuki Hsu in 1998 as "Ai De Ding Dong".
