= Fiesta (Carlito album) =

Studio album by Carlito
- Released: July 12, 2006
- Genre: Eurodance; Mariachi
- Length: 39:14
- Label: Warner Bros., Dreamusic Inc.

Carlito chronology
Under the Kilt (2001)	Fiesta (2006)	World Wild (2007)

Singles from Fiesta
- 1. "Who's That Boy?" Released: 8 June 2005; 2. "Poco Loco" Released: 28 September 2005; 3. "Fiesta" Released: 12 July 2006

Fiesta is the fourth studio album by Swedish Eurodance artist Jonny Jakobsen and his first album under the pseudonym Carlito. It was released on 12 July 2006. The album has a satirical ethnic theme, blending elements of Mexican mariachi with a Eurodance sound.

== Track listing ==
The following tracks were featured on the original CD release:

1. Carlito (¿Who's That Boy?) – 3:16
2. Taco Boy – 3:05
3. Poco Loco – 3:22
4. Casa De Carlito – 3:36
5. El Camino – 3:51
6. Adios Amigo – 3:24
7. Alarma Caramba! – 3:07
8. I Like It – 3:06
9. Vacaciones – 3:25
10. My Salsa – 3:04
11. Manana – 2:53
12. Fiesta Night – 3:04

== The Ultimate Collection ==
On 15 November 2006, a special CD-DVD combo edition of the album, entitled The Ultimate Collection was released in Japan exclusively. The DVD content included music videos for the tracks Poco Loco and Go Go Carlito, two TV spots and a four-part animated feature entitled Carlito The Movie.

The CD features the following bonus tracks:

1. Christmas Fiesta – 3:35
2. Carlito (¿Who's That Boy?) (Christmas Mix) – 3:18
3. Carlito (¿Who's That Boy?) (F. Factory Latin Mix) – 7:19
4. Carlito (¿Who's That Boy?) (F. Factory Trance Mix) – 6:50
5. Carlito (¿Who's That Boy?) (Eurobeat Mix) – 4:28
6. Carlito (¿Who's That Boy?) ("HBS" Mix) – 4:09
7. Carlito (¿Who's That Boy?) (Myxx-Up Future Latin Mix) – 4:03
8. Carlito (¿Who's That Boy?) (Karaoke Version) – 3:18
