= Calcutta (Taxi Taxi Taxi) =

1998 single by Dr. Bombay

"Calcutta (Taxi, Taxi, Taxi)"

Single by Dr. Bombay

from the album Rice & Curry
- B-side: "Calcutta (Extended Version)"
- Released: April 1998
- Genre: Eurodance
- Length: 3:20
- Label: WEA
- Songwriters: Robert Uhlmann; Cesar Zamini
- Producers: Robert Uhlmann; Robin Rex

Dr. Bombay singles chronology
"Calcutta (Taxi, Taxi, Taxi)" (1998)	"S.O.S. (The Tiger Took My Family)" (1998)

Music video
- "Calcutta (Taxi, Taxi, Taxi)" on YouTube

"Calcutta (Taxi, Taxi, Taxi)" is a song recorded by Swedish eurodance artist Dr. Bombay. It was released in 1998 as the lead single from his debut album, Rice & Curry. The song became Jakobsen's first major hit, topping the charts at number-one in Sweden and number 2 in Norway. In Denmark, it peaked at number 12. On the Eurochart Hot 100, the single peaked at number 31 in October 1998. The song is sung from the perspective of Dr. Bombay, an eccentric Indian taxi driver who is employed by his uncle and, despite his impaired vision and lack of a license to operate, loves to drive his taxi. Music & Media noted the song as an "Asian-flavoured poppy dance tune (try imagining Aqua with an Indian singer)" in their review of the song.

== Music video ==
An accompanying music video for the song was produced in 1998. It shows Jakobsen clad in a kurta, pagri and dark glasses, driving the streets of Calcutta in an Austin FX4 as he collides with pedestrians and debris, steals the lunch of an unsuspecting restaurant customer, steals a newspaper in a similar manner and hangs outside his taxi window in roller skates as various engine parts are continuously breaking off from the car. Throughout the video, the action frequently cuts to a 180 degree pan of the taxi's interior, in which Jakobsen is superimposed with several instances of himself who can be seen making hand gestures, dancing, sleeping, hanging out the windows and interacting with each other.

Much of the video was filmed in Malaysia, as can be deduced from vehicle number plates on display throughout, and as well as a brief Batu Caves sightings on the background.

== Track listing and formats ==
- Swedish CD single
1. "Calcutta (Original Version)" – 3:20
2. "Calcutta (Extended Version)" – 4:16
- European CD maxi-single
1. "Calcutta (Original Version)" – 3:20
2. "Calcutta (Extended Version)" – 4:16
3. "Calcutta (Karaokee Version)" – 3:18
4. "Calcutta (Alternative Mix)" – 3:37

== Remixes and samples ==
- A remixed version of the song by Basshunter appears on Jakobsen's first compilation album The Hits as a bonus track.
- The song was featured in the South Korean comedy program Gag Concert a few times.
- Taiwanese pop singer Yuki Hsu covered the song in 1999 as "Who's Naughty".

== In other media ==
"Calcutta" was licensed for inclusion in the music game Beatmania IIDX 2nd Style.

== Charts ==
=== Weekly charts ===
Weekly chart performance for "Calcutta (Taxi, Taxi, Taxi)"
Chart (1998)	Peak position
Austria (Ö3 Austria Top 40)	31
Denmark (IFPI)	12
Europe (European Hot 100 Singles)	31
Finland (Suomen virallinen lista)	31
Germany (GfK)	28
Norway (VG-lista)	2
Sweden (Sverigetopplistan)	1
Switzerland (Schweizer Hitparade)	35

=== Year-end charts ===
Year-end chart performance for "Calcutta (Taxi, Taxi, Taxi)"
Chart (1998)	Position
Sweden (Hitlistan)	3

== Certifications ==
Certifications for "Calcutta (Taxi, Taxi, Taxi)"
Region	Certification	Certified units/sales
Norway (IFPI Norway)	Platinum	
Sweden (GLF)	2× Platinum	60,000^{^}
^{^} Shipments figures based on certification alone.
