= S.O.S. (The Tiger Took My Family) =

1998 single by Dr. Bombay

Single by Dr. Bombay

from the album Rice & Curry
- B-side: "S.O.S. (The Tiger Took My Family) (Instrumental)"
- Released: June 1, 1998
- Genre: Eurodance
- Length: 3:29
- Label: WEA
- Songwriter(s): Robert Uhlmann; Cesar Zamini
- Producer(s): Robert Uhlmann; Robin Rex

Dr. Bombay singles chronology
"Calcutta (Taxi Taxi Taxi)" (1998)	"S.O.S. (The Tiger Took My Family)" (1998)	"Rice & Curry" (1998)

Music video
- "S.O.S. (The Tiger Took My Family)" on YouTube

"S.O.S. (The Tiger Took My Family)" is a song recorded by Swedish Eurodance artist Dr. Bombay. It was released in 1998 as the second single from his debut album, Rice & Curry (1998). The song was a top 10 hit in Norway and Sweden (number two), while reaching the top 20 in Finland.

== Content ==
The song has a humorous theme and is sung from the perspective of Dr. Bombay, a snake charmer and mystic whose peaceful life in the outskirts of rural Calcutta is interrupted when a vicious tiger begins abducting members of his family.

== Track listing and formats ==
- Swedish CD single
1. "S.O.S. (The Tiger Took My Family)" – 3:29
2. "S.O.S. (The Tiger Took My Family)" (Instrumental) – 3:25
- European CD maxi-single
1. "S.O.S. (The Tiger Took My Family)" (Original Version) – 3:27
2. "S.O.S. (The Tiger Took My Family)" (Extended Ravi-Dance Version) – 4:43
3. "S.O.S. (The Tiger Took My Family)" (Instrumental - Be Your Own Dr. Version) – 3:27
4. "S.O.S. (The Tiger Took My Family)" (S.O.S. Shaky Snake's Meditation) – 2:51

== Music video ==
An accompanying music video for the song was produced in 1998. The video opens with an introduction to Dr. Bombay's family and their peaceful life in the outskirts of Calcutta, followed by a montage of each family member running in terror from the performer dressed as the tiger. The rest of the video follows Dr. Bombay pursuing the tiger through the jungle while armed with a slingshot. He's seen swinging on vines, running in place in front of a green screen and unwittingly shooting hikers and travellers as he desperately searches for the tiger. The video ends with the eventual defeat of the tiger and the rescuing of the family.

== Other media ==
A cover version of the song was included in the rhythm game, Samba de Amigo Ver. 2000, as well as the game's soundtrack release.

The pilot episode of the Japanese anime Popee the Performer, entitled "Popee the Clown", uses this song as background music.

"S.O.S" was licensed for inclusion in the music game Beatmania IIDX 2nd Style.

== Charts ==
=== Weekly charts ===
Weekly chart performance for "S.O.S. (The Tiger Took My Family)"
Chart (1998–1999)	Peak position
Europe (European Hot 100 Singles)	62
Finland (Suomen virallinen lista)	15
Germany (GfK)	30
Norway (VG-lista)	6
Sweden (Sverigetopplistan)	2

=== Year-end charts ===
1998 year-end chart performance for "S.O.S. (The Tiger Took My Family)"
Chart (1998)	Position
Sweden (Hitlistan)	12

1999 year-end chart performance for "S.O.S. (The Tiger Took My Family)"
Chart (1999)	Position
Romania (Romanian Top 100)	93

== Certifications ==
Certifications for "S.O.S. (The Tiger Took My Family)"
Region	Certification	Certified units/sales
Norway (IFPI Norway)	Gold	
Sweden (GLF)	Platinum	30,000^{^}
^{^} Shipments figures based on certification alone.
