= Rice & Curry (song) =

Single by Dr. Bombay

from the album Rice & Curry
- Released: November 1998
- Genre: Bubblegum Dance, Eurodance
- Length: Warner Bros.
- Songwriters: Robert Uhlmann, Ceasar Zamini

Dr. Bombay singles chronology
"S.O.S (The Tiger Took My Family)" (1998)	"Rice & Curry" (1998)	"Girlie Girlie" (1999)

"Rice & Curry" is a song recorded by Swedish Eurodance artist Dr. Bombay. It was released in 1998 as the third single from his debut album, Rice & Curry (1998).

== Content ==
The song has a humorous tone and is sung from the perspective of Dr. Bombay, a rice and curry chef who operates a restaurant in Calcutta while his uncle, a rice farmer, is on holiday. His eventual frustration with the negative response to his food leads him to re-brand his rice as glue to much success.

== Track listing ==
- CD single

The following tracks are on the CD single:

1. Rice & Curry (Single Version) – 3:13
2. Rice & Curry (Karaoke Version) – 3:13
- CD maxi

The following tracks are on the 1999 maxi single:

1. Rice & Curry (Original Version) – 3:13
2. Rice & Curry (Extended Version) – 4:37
3. Rice & Curry (Indian Meditation Mix) – 3:44
4. Rice & Curry (Karaoke Version) – 3:13

== Music video ==
An accompanying music video for the song was produced in 1998. The video features Jakobsen as Dr. Bombay and a multitude of backup dancers dressed in traditional Indian clothing, dancing, drumming, preparing and eating rice and curry and breathing fire as a result. The setting of the video is "Dr. Bombay · Flaming Hot Curry", a tented eating establishment equipped with strobe lights and elaborate live entertainment. Throughout the video, Jakobsen and the supporting dancers are seen rushing with water pistols to extinguish the flaming breath of customers who have eaten the curry.

The music video was shot on the rooftop of the Kuala Lumpur railway station in Malaysia.

== Charts ==
Chart (1998–1999)	Peak positions
Finland (Suomen virallinen lista)	15
Sweden (Sverigetopplistan)	15
