= Camptown Races =

1850 minstrel song by Stephen Foster

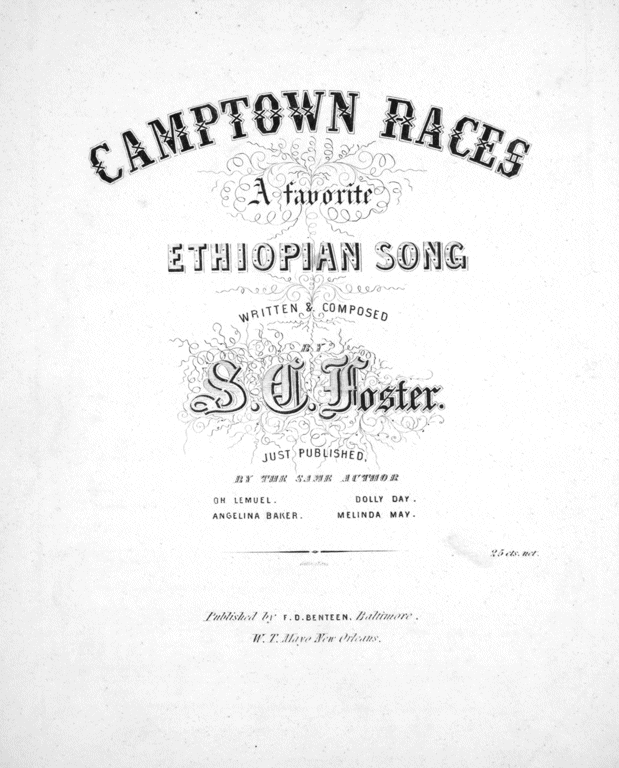
- Original sheet music cover

Song by Stephen Foster
- Written: 1850
- Published: February 1850
- Genre: Minstrel show

"De Camptown Races" or "Gwine to Run All Night" (nowadays popularly known as "Camptown Races") is a folk song by American Romantic composer Stephen Foster. It was published in February 1850 by F. D. Benteen and was introduced to the American mainstream by Christy's Minstrels, eventually becoming one of the most popular folk/Americana tunes of the nineteenth century. It is Roud Folk Song Index no. 11768.

== Composition ==
Historians cite the village of Camptown, Pennsylvania, as the basis for the song, located in the mountains of northeast Pennsylvania. The Pennsylvania Historical Society confirmed that Foster traveled through the small town and afterwards wrote the song. The Bradford County Historical Society documents Foster attending school in nearby Towanda at Towanda Academy and Athens at Athens Academy in 1840 and 1841. The Towanda school was located 14 miles (23 km) from the racetrack and the Athens school 29 miles (47 km).

Richard Jackson was curator of the Americana Collection at New York Public Library; he writes:

Foster quite specifically tailored the song for use on the minstrel stage. He composed it as a piece for solo voice with group interjections and refrain ... his dialect verses have all the wild exaggeration and rough charm of folk tale as well as some of his most vivid imagery ... Together with "Oh! Susanna", "Camptown Races" is one of the gems of the minstrel era.

The lyrics talk about a group of transients in a camp town who bet on horses to try to make some money. Being that betting on horses was considered immoral, the "Camptown ladies" may also have been shady. Despite the minstrel shows being widely considered racist, this and other songs written during that period have managed to remain standards in the American national repertoire.

"Camptown Races" was originally written in an imitation of African American Vernacular English, using the supposed dialect of a stereotypical African American; for example, "de" and "gwine" recur.

== Lyrics ==
Original lyrics by Stephen Foster (1850)

De Camptown ladies sing dis song, Doo-dah! doo-dah!
De Camptown race-track five miles long, Oh, doo-dah day!
I come down dah wid my hat caved in, Doo-dah! doo-dah!
I go back home wid a pocket full of tin, Oh, doo-dah day!

CHORUS
Gwine to run all night!
Gwine to run all day!
I'll bet my money on de bob-tail nag,
Somebody bet on de bay.

De long tail filly and de big black hoss, Doo-dah! doo-dah!
Dey fly de track and dey both cut across, Oh, doo-dah-day!
De blind hoss sticken in a big mud hole, Doo-dah! doo-dah!
Can't touch bottom wid a ten foot pole, Oh, doo-dah day!

CHORUS

Old muley cow come on to de track, Doo-dah! doo-dah!
De bob-tail fling her ober his back, Oh, doo-dah-day!
Den fly along like a rail-road car, Doo-dah! doo-dah!
Runnin' a race wid a shootin' star, Oh, doo-dah-day!

CHORUS

See dem flyin' on a ten mile heat, Doo-dah! doo-dah!
Round de race track, den repeat, Oh, doo-dah-day!
I win my money on de bob-tail nag, Doo-dah!, doo-dah!
I keep my money in an old tow bag, Oh, doo-dah-day!

CHORUS

Adapted modern lyrics

Camptown ladies sing this song, Doo-dah! doo-dah!
Camptown race-track five miles long, Oh, doo-dah day!
I come down here with my hat caved in, Doo-dah! doo-dah!
I go back home with a pocket full of tin, Oh, doo-dah day!

CHORUS
Gonna run all night!
Gonna run all day!
I'll bet my money on the bob-tail nag,
Somebody bet on the bay.

The long tail filly and the big black horse, Doo-dah! doo-dah!
They fly the track and they both cut across, Oh, doo-dah-day!
The blind horse sticken in a big mud hole, Doo-dah! doo-dah!
Can't touch bottom with a ten foot pole, Oh, doo-dah day!

CHORUS

Old muley cow come on to the track, Doo-dah! doo-dah!
The bob-tail fling her over his back, Oh, doo-dah-day!
Then fly along like a rail-road car, Doo-dah! doo-dah!
Runnin' a race with a shootin' star, Oh, doo-dah-day!

CHORUS

See them flyin' on a ten mile heat, Doo-dah! doo-dah!
Round the race track, then repeat, Oh, doo-dah-day!
I win my money on the bob-tail nag, Doo-dah!, doo-dah!
I keep my money in an old tow bag, Oh, doo-dah-day!

CHORUS

== Reception ==
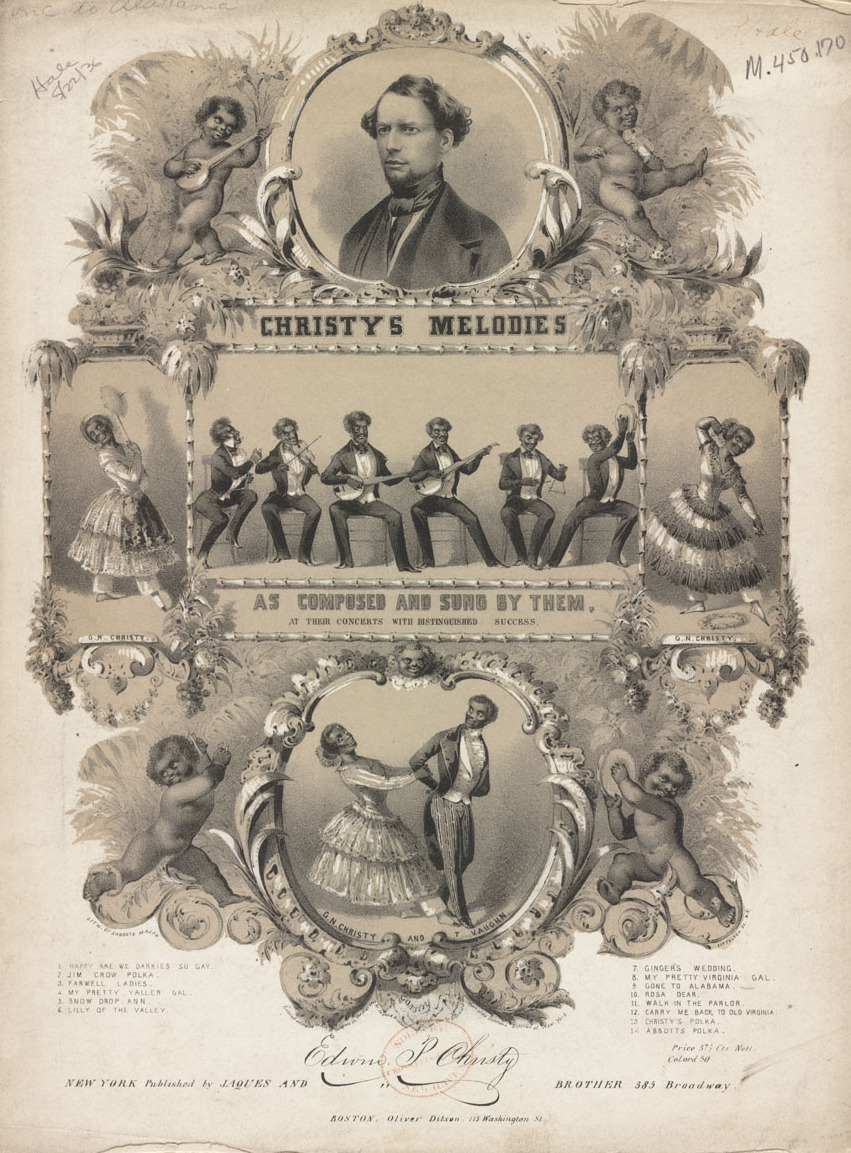
"Camptown Races" was introduced by the Christy's Minstrels in 1850

In The Americana Song Reader, William Emmett Studwell writes that the song was introduced by the Christy Minstrels, noting that Foster's "nonsense lyrics are much of the charm of this bouncy and enduring bit of Americana", and the song was a big hit with minstrel troupes throughout the country. Foster's music was used for derivatives that include "Banks of the Sacramento", "A Capital Ship" (1875), and a pro-Lincoln parody introduced during the 1860 presidential campaign.

Richard Crawford observes in America's Musical Life that the song resembles Dan Emmett's "Old Dan Tucker", and he suggests that Foster used Emmett's piece as a model. Both songs feature contrast between a high instrumental register with a low vocal one, comic exaggeration, hyperbole, verse and refrain, call and response, and syncopation. However, Foster's melody is "jaunty and tuneful" while Emmett's is "driven and aggressive". Crawford points out that the differences in the two songs represent two different musical styles, as well as a shift in minstrelsy from the rough spirit and "muscular, unlyrical music" of the 1840s, to a more genteel spirit and lyricism with an expanding repertoire that included sad songs, sentimental and love songs, and parodies of opera. Crawford explains that, by mid-century, the "noisy, impromptu entertainments" characteristic of Dan Emmett and the Virginia Minstrels were passé and the minstrel stage was changing to a "restrained and balanced kind of spectacle".

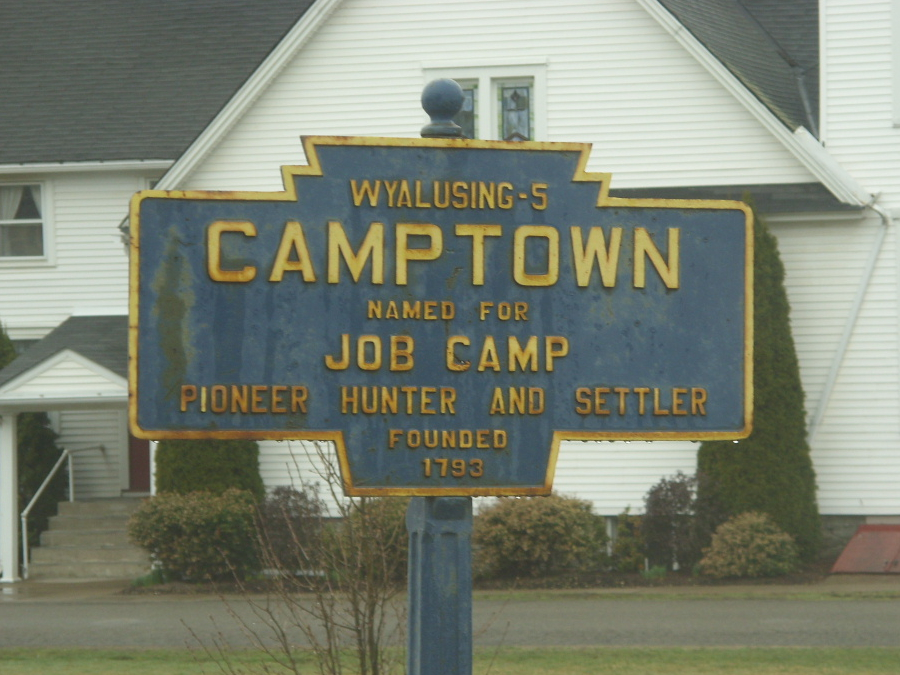
Keystone Marker for Camptown, 4.2 miles north of Wyalusing, Pennsylvania

The song was the impetus for renaming Camptown, a village of Clinton Township, Essex County, New Jersey. When the new ballad was published in 1850, some residents of the village were mortified to be associated with the bawdiness of the song. The wife of the local postmaster suggested Irvington, to commemorate writer Washington Irving, which was adopted in 1852.

F. D. Benteen later released a different version with guitar accompaniment in 1852 under the title "The Celebrated Ethiopian Song/Camptown Races". Louis Moreau Gottschalk quotes the melody in his virtuoso piano work "Grotesque Fantasie, the Banjo", op. 15, published in 1855. In 1909, composer Charles Ives incorporated the tune and other vernacular American melodies into his orchestral Symphony No. 2. Portions of the song's melody were quoted in Aaron Copland's 1942 Lincoln Portrait.

== Recordings and uses ==
As one of the most popular folk tunes, "Camptown Races" has been referred to repeatedly in cinema, television and other means of media. Like many of Foster's songs, it was originally recorded on the phonograph in the early twentieth century; 1911 saw its first recording, by Billy Murray, originally sung with the American Quartet. The 1939 biopic about Foster Swanee River prominently features a performance of the tune by Al Jolson. A favourite in twentieth-century cartoons, the Looney Tunes and Merrie Melodies character Foghorn Leghorn frequently hums the tune to himself in most of the 28 cartoons he appears in, produced between 1946 and 1963 (very similar to Huckleberry Hound, from Hanna-Barbera, who regularly hums or sings Oh My Darling, Clementine in the series). The Bugs Bunny shorts Mississippi Hare and Southern Fried Rabbit relate to the song's Southern heritage to portray stereotypes of African Americans. A parody version of the song, called "Brainstem," was featured in Season 1, Episode 3 of Pinky and the Brain, to teach about the parts of the brain. Many Western films, such as Riding High, Blazing Saddles and Sweet Savage, feature brief singing performances of "Camptown Races".Chief Wiggum performs a cover of the song in Season 7, Episode 16 of The Simpsons, while he uses the skull of Jebediah Springfield as a ventriloquist dummy.

"Gwine to Run All Night" by Harry C. Browne (1916)
1916 phonographic record of "Camptown Races" by Harry C. Browne

The song was revived on a number of occasions in the twentieth century with recordings by Bing Crosby (recorded December 9, 1940), Johnny Mercer (1945), Al Jolson (recorded July 17, 1950), Julie London (included in her album Swing Me an Old Song, 1959), and Frankie Laine (included in his album Deuces Wild, 1961). In 1970 Kenny Rogers and The First Edition, on their album Tell It All Brother, recorded the somg under the title "Camptown Ladies". The football song "Two World Wars and One World Cup" is set the tune of "Camptown Races", chanted as part of the England–Germany football rivalry.

The chorus of "Camptown Races" was also featured heavily in 1998 by the band Squirrel Nut Zippers in their song "The Ghost of Stephen Foster". In the same year, a novelty Eurodance cover of the song, with several changed lyrics, was released under the title DooDah! by the Danish group Cartoons. It reached the top 10 of several European singles charts, its highest position being number 3 in the Danish Hitlisten.
