= Los Umbrellos =

Latin pop dance group from Denmark

- Los Umbrellos, 1997

Background information
- Origin: Copenhagen, Denmark
- Genres: Latin pop
- Years active: 1997–1999
- Labels: Virgin Records, Flex Records, EMI Music, Time Records
- Past members: Al Agami; Mai Britt Vingsøe; Grith Höifeldt

Los Umbrellos was a Latin pop dance group formed in Denmark. It was formed by record producer Kenneth Bager in 1997 and disbanded in 1999. It was led by the rapper Al Agami, the exiled crown prince of the small African enclave of Lado. His family fled to Denmark to escape the persecution of Ugandan dictator Idi Amin. The group contained backing vocals from two former models and Danish TV co-hosts, Mai Britt Vingsøe and Grith Höifeldt.

The group released their only album in 1997, entitled Flamenco Funk. Their single, "No Tengo Dinero", went to number 33 on the UK Singles Chart, and peaked at number 42 on the U.S. Billboard Hot 100 that year. The song also hit No. 1 in Austria and the top five in New Zealand, Switzerland and Italy.

== Discography ==
=== Studio albums ===
Title	Details	Peak chart positions	
Title	Details	AUT	SWI
Flamenco Funk	Release date: February 10, 1998; Label: FLEX Records; Formats: CD	10	30
"—" denotes releases that did not chart

=== Singles ===
Year	Single	Peak chart positions								Certifications (sales thresholds)	Album
Year	Single	AUT	CAN	NED	ITA	NZ	SUI	UK	U.S.	Certifications (sales thresholds)	Album
1997	"No Tengo Dinero"	1	31	22	4	2	3	33	42	AUT: Platinum	Flamenco Funk
1998	"Easy Come, Easy Go"	—	—	—	—	—	—	—	—		Flamenco Funk
1998	"Drive"	—	—	—	—	—	—	—	—		Flamenco Funk
1998	"Gigolò"	—	—	—	—	—	—	—	—		Flamenco Funk
"—" denotes releases that did not chart
