= Cartoons (band) =

Danish Eurodance band

- Also known as: Cartoons DK; The Scooters (late 1980s–1997)
- Origin: Denmark
- Genre: Eurodance
- Years active: 1997–2001, 2005–2006, 2018–present
- Labels: FLEX (1997–99); EMI Denmark (2000–06)
- Members: Toonie (Martin Fredensborg Nielsen); Sponge (Jesper Dukholt); Shooter (Carsten Arndt-Larsson); Buzz (Thomas Rene Clausen); Puddy (Sofie Lerstrup); Boop (Ines Bukic)
- Past members: Toonie (Martin Østengaard); Shooter (Erling Jensen); Buzz (Dave Stevens); Puddy (Natasja Skov); Boop (Karina Jensen)
- Website: cartoons-world.com

Cartoons, also known as Cartoons DK, are a Danish Eurodance band, best known for their song "DooDah" and their cover of the 1958 novelty song "Witch Doctor", both hits released in 1998.

The group wears outlandish plastic costumes and wigs in live performances as caricatures of 1950s American rock and roll stars.

== History ==
Cartoons started out as the Scooters in the late 1980s, playing rockabilly music from the 50s and 60s. In 1994, the Scooters released the album Live at Woodstock, and in 1997, they changed their name to Cartoons. Their musical style switched from rockabilly to "technobilly", their own expression of rock and roll mixed with Eurodance; many of their songs are remakes of old rockabilly hits that they covered as the Scooters. The group was first signed to FLEX Records, moving later to EMI Denmark.

Their most notable single to date is their cover version of Ross Bagdasarian's novelty song "Witch Doctor", which reached No. 2 in the UK Singles Chart. It features a combination of the original's "oo-ee-oo-ah-ah, ting-tang, walla-walla, bing-bang" chorus (albeit lacking the record's double-speed playback of the chorus), driving dance beat and occasional guitar breaks. The group had further success in the UK with the Top 10 hit "Doodah" (a cover version of the American folk song "Camptown Races", adapted with completely different lyrics), the Top 20 hit "Aisy Waisy", which was performed on Jim Davidson's Generation Game, and a Top 20 debut album, Toonage (later rereleased with extra tracks as More Toonage).

The group's second album, Toontastic, did not match the success of its predecessor, but several notable hits were released from it, including "Diddley-Dee", "Little Red Ridinghood", "Big Coconuts", Lally Stott's "Chirpy Chirpy Cheep Cheep" and a reworked cover of Les Humphries Singers' "Mama Loo". The group was one of several artists to contribute to the soundtrack of the 2000 animated film Help! I'm a Fish, with the track "Wobble-Di-Bubble-Di-Doo".

Cartoons disbanded in 2001, with the reasons remaining initially unclear. Toonie and Sponge later revealed in a Danish TV interview that the group had planned a US tour, but these plans were cancelled following the September 11 attacks. The group briefly reunited in 2005 to promote their Greatest Toons album, released by CMC Entertainment, which featured three new tracks, including the single "Day Oh". They performed a number of shows throughout Europe, including appearances at Bonbonland and the Jelling Musikfestival.

In July 2016, Karina Jensen died of cancer, which she had been diagnosed with in 2012. She was survived by her husband and two children. In 2018, the group returned once again to perform at the "We Love the 90s" festival in Aalborg, Denmark. In April 2019, Erling Jensen died of lymphoma; he was 50 years old. Later that year, another compilation album, De Bedste, was released by Warner Music Group and X5 Music Group; it included a remix of their cover version of the Police's "De Do Do Do De Da Da Da" by Sponge.

In 2020, the group returned to the studio with original producer Kenneth Bager to record a new single, "Shots", which was released in 2023. Later that year, they collaborated with Marnage to produce a faster version of "DooDah", titled "DooDah 2K23".

In 2025, the group released another new single, "Gettin Saxy". Later that year, they collaborated with Tobias Bjerre and Morten Münster to produce a brand new version of "DooDah" with new lyrics in Danish (albeit with the song's chorus in English), titled "DUDA".

As of 2025, Jesper Dukholt is the sole original member. Martin Østengaard, while no longer an active member of the group, remains as a composer.

== Members ==
True to their name, the personnel of Cartoons has cartoon-inspired nicknames. The line-up is:

- Toonie – lead vocals and backing vocals
- Sponge – saxophone, keyboards and bass vocals
- Shooter – lead guitar and backing vocals
- Buzz – double bass and occasional backing vocals
- Puddy – backing vocals
- Boop – backing vocals

== Discography ==
=== Albums ===
==== Studio albums ====
List of albums, with selected chart positions and certifications
Title	Album details	Peak chart positions									Certifications
Title	Album details	BEL	DEN	NLD	NOR	SPA	SWE	POR	ITA	UK	Certifications
Toonage	Released: 24 September 1998; Label: FLEX; Formats: CD; cassette; Rereleased in 1999 with extra tracks as More Toonage	25	2	24	14	8	12	10	6	17	IFPI DEN: 2× Platinum; UK BPI: Gold
Toontastic	Released: 2 May 2001; Label: FLEX; Formats: CD; cassette	—	7	—	—	—	—	—	—	—	
"—" denotes items which were not released in that country or failed to chart.

==== Compilation albums ====
List of albums, with selected chart positions
Title	Album details	Peak chart positions
Title	Album details	DEN
Greatest Toons	Released: 2005; Label: CMC; Formats: CD	20
Cartoons: De Bedste	Released: 2019; Labels: Warner Music Group; X5 Music Group; Formats: Digital download	—
"—" denotes items which were not released in that country or failed to chart.

=== Singles ===
==== As main artist ====
List of singles, with selected chart positions and certifications, showing release year and album name
Year	Title	Peak chart positions													Certifications	Album
Year	Title	AUS	BEL	DEN	FRA	IRE	ITA	NLD	NZ	SWE	SPA	GER	UK	EUR	Certifications	Album
1998	"DooDah"	31	5	3	—	21	9	56	31	10	19	—	7	15		Toonage
1998	"Witch Doctor"	—	9	—	22	2	—	12	31	13	—	68	2	11	UK BPI: Platinum	Toonage
1998	"Yoko"	—	41	—	—	—	—	—	—	51	—	—	—	—		Toonage
1998	"Let's Go Childish"	—	—	—	—	—	—	—	—	—	—	—	—	—		Toonage
1999	"Aisy Waisy"	—	—	—	—	—	—	34	—	—	—	—	16	54		Toonage
1999	"The X-Mas Single (Santa Claus Is Coming to Town & Just Can't Wait)"	—	—	9	—	—	—	—	—	43	—	—	—	—		More Toonage
2000	"Diddley-Dee"	—	—	—	—	—	40	—	—	46	—	—	—	—		Toontastic
2000	"Mama Loo"	—	—	—	—	—	—	—	—	—	—	—	—	—		Toontastic
2001	"Big Coconuts"	—	—	—	—	—	—	—	—	—	—	—	—	—		Toontastic
2005	"Day Oh (Ekkosangen)"	—	—	—	—	—	—	—	—	—	—	—	—	—		Greatest Toons
2023	"Shots"	—	—	—	—	—	—	—	—	—	—	—	—	—		Non-album singles
2025	"Gettin Saxy"	—	—	—	—	—	—	—	—	—	—	—	—	—		Non-album singles
"—" denotes items which were not released in that country or failed to chart.

==== As featured artist ====
List of singles, with selected chart positions and certifications, showing release year and album name
Year	Title	Peak chart positions	Album
Year	Title	DEN	Album
1999	"Selv en dråbe" (as part of a charity single in aid of Kosovo)	1	Grænseløs Greatest
2023	"DooDah 2K23" (as part of a collaboration with Marnage)	—	Non-album singles
2025	"DUDA" (as part of a collaboration with Tobias Bjerre and Morten Münster)	—	Non-album singles
"—" denotes items which were not released in that country or failed to chart.
