= Jonny Jakobsen =

Danish-Swedish musician

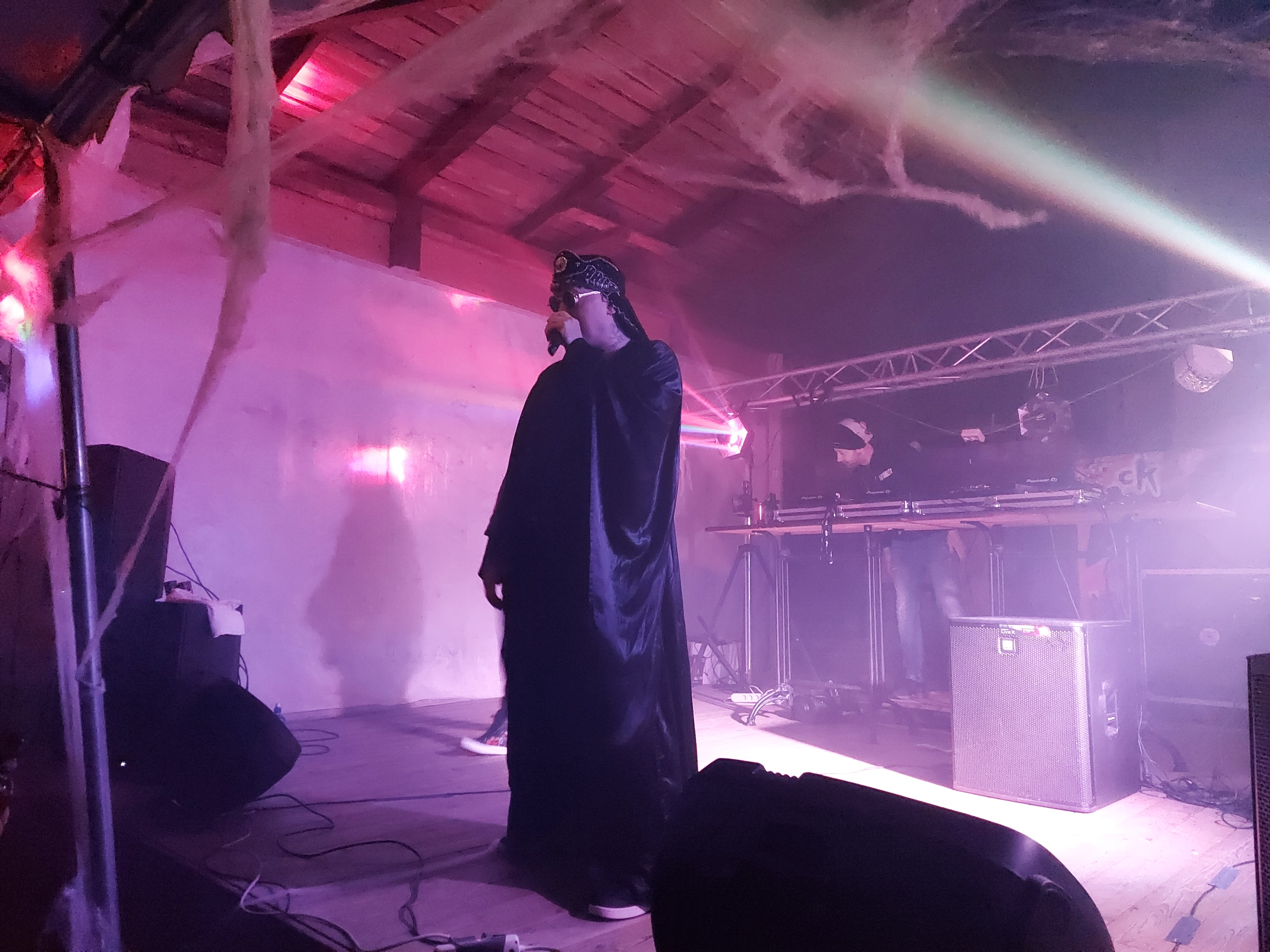
- Dr. Bombay in 2022
- Born: 17 November 1963 (age 62); Malmö, Sweden
- Other names: Dr. Bombay; Dr. MacDoo; Carlito; Johnny Moonshine
- Occupations: Singer; songwriter; musician
- Years active: 1995–2007; 2018–2019
- Children: Jimmy Jakobsen
- Musical career
- Genre: Eurodance
- Instrument: Vocals
- Label: EMI

Jonny Jakobsen (born 17 November 1963) is a Danish-Swedish former Eurodance singer better known under his fictitious identity as Indian taxi driver Dr. Bombay. He began as a country singer called Johnny Moonshine, but became famous only after developing the persona of Dr. Bombay. His debut was in 1998 with the album Rice and Curry, hitting the charts with the title track "Rice & Curry", as well as "Calcutta (Taxi Taxi Taxi)" and "S.O.S. (The Tiger Took My Family)". Subsequently, he went on to record albums as faux-Scottish Dr. MacDoo and faux-Mexican Carlito. Even though he grew up in Sweden, his citizenship is Danish. He speaks both Danish and Swedish.

He has gained some fame and notoriety in the Europop scene. He is featured in several video games.

== Before "Dr. Bombay" ==
Jonny Jakobsen was born in Sweden on 17 November 1963 to a Danish father, Ejner Jakobsen, and a Swedish mother who died in 1992 or 1993. He and his twin sister Susanne are the youngest of five children. He has two older sisters, Vinni and Lis, and an older brother, Niels. He has a son named Jimmy Jakobsen, born in 1983 or 1984.

Before his music career, he was a taxi driver in Copenhagen.

He began his career as a faux-country/pop singer called Johnny Moonshine. As Johnny Moonshine, Jakobsen released one album titled, Johnny Moonshine & The Troubled Water Band (1995).

After the limited success of Johnny Moonshine, Jakobsen moved on in search of a newer, more 'annoying' sound. He chose the style of Eurodance, which was just becoming popular in the mid-1990s, and began his career as the fake Indian "Dr. Bombay", facing controversy along the way. According to the Notable Names Database, the Indian government was at the time considering suing Jakobsen for the caricature but in the end decided against it as lawyers told them that "you can't sue someone for being annoying". Jakobsen teamed up with Robert Uhlmann, well-known for his work with Smile.dk.

== Johnny Moonshine ==
=== Albums ===
Year	Album	Peak chart positions	Certifications (sales thresholds)
Year	Album	SWE	Certifications (sales thresholds)
1995	Johnny Moonshine & the Troubled Water Band	–	

== Dr. Bombay ==
Jakobsen's earliest career success was prompted by the introduction of the Dr. Bombay character in 1998. In his lyrics, the character is portrayed as an Indian taxi driver, mystic, sitar player, chef, snake charmer and avid fan of elephant racing. He appears clad in traditional Indian garb, such as a kurta and pagri, with the addition of dark glasses that are also worn by the other characters portrayed by Jakobsen.

In 2018, Dr. Bombay celebrated his 20th anniversary with a new single entitled "Stockholm to Bombay". a year later on 5 October 2019 he published a music video for the song "Stockholm to Bombay".

=== Albums ===
Year	Album	Peak chart positions				Certifications (sales thresholds)
Year	Album	FIN	NOR	DEN	SWE	Certifications (sales thresholds)
1998	Rice & Curry	2	2	1	1	

=== Singles ===
Year	Single	Peak chart positions					Certifications (sales thresholds)	Album
Year	Single	AUT	GER	NOR	SUI	SWE	Certifications (sales thresholds)	Album
1998	"Calcutta (Taxi Taxi Taxi)"	31	28	2	35	1	NOR: Platinum; SWE: Platinum	Rice & Curry
1998	"S.O.S. (The Tiger Took My Family)"	—	30	6	—	2	NOR: Gold; SWE: Platinum	Rice & Curry
1998	"Rice & Curry"	—	—	—	—	15		Rice & Curry
1999	"Girlie, Girlie"	—	—	—	—	46		Rice & Curry
1999	"Indy Dancing"	—	—	—	—	—		Rice & Curry
2018	"Stockholm to Bombay"	—	—	—	—	—		
"—" denotes releases that did not chart

== Dr. MacDoo ==
=== Albums ===
Year	Album	Peak chart positions	Certifications (sales thresholds)
Year	Album	SWE	Certifications (sales thresholds)
2000	Under the Kilt	30	

=== Singles ===
Year	Single	Peak chart positions	Album
Year	Single	SWE	Album
2000	"Macahula Dance"	4	Under the Kilt
2000	"Under the Kilt"	41	Under the Kilt
"—" denotes releases that did not chart

== Carlito ==
=== Albums ===
Year	Album	Peak chart positions	Certifications (sales thresholds)
Year	Album	SWE	Certifications (sales thresholds)
2006	Fiesta	–	
2007	World Wild	–	

=== Singles ===
Year	Single	Peak chart positions	Album
Year	Single	SWE	Album
2005	"Carlito (¿Who's That Boy?)"	17	Fiesta
2006	"Fiesta"	—	Fiesta
"—" denotes releases that did not chart

== In video games ==
Song	Games
"S.O.S. (The Tiger Took My Family)"	Beatmania IIDX 3rd Style (Console), Samba de Amigo Ver.2000 (Arcade and Dreamcast)
"Calcutta"	Beatmania IIDX 3rd Style (Console)
"Poco Loco"	Pump It Up PRO 2 (Arcade), StepManiaX (Arcade)
"Stockholm to Bombay"	StepManiaX (Arcade)
"Fiesta Night"	StepManiaX (Arcade)
"My Salsa"	StepManiaX (Arcade)
