= The Heebee-jeebees =

Canadian a cappella musical quartet

Surgical Strike

Studio album by The Heebee-jeebees
- Released: 2006
- Recorded: 2006
- Genre: A Cappella
- Label: Guy Records
- Producer: Chris Herard

The Heebee-jeebees chronology
Xmas Nuts	Surgical Strike

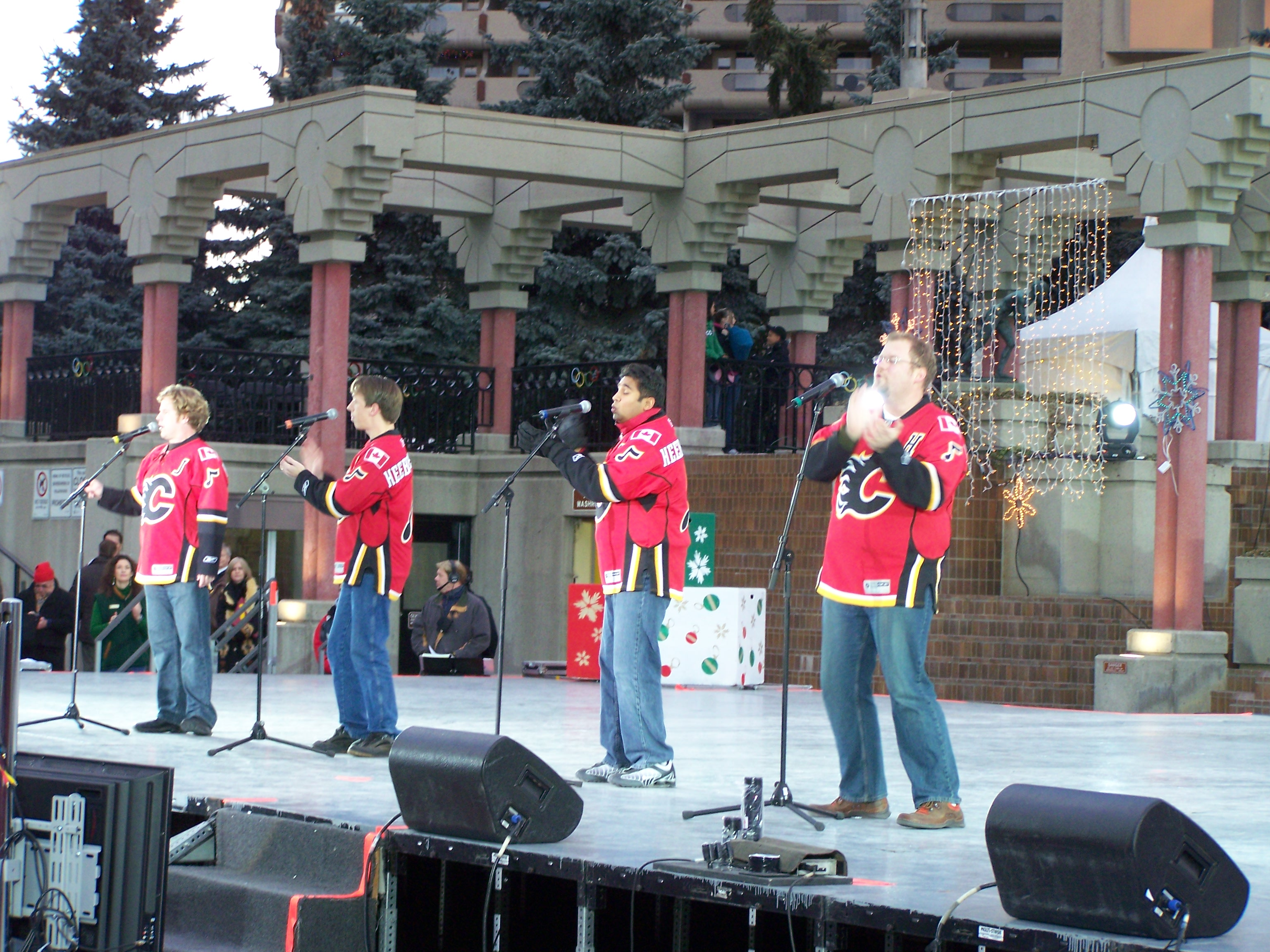
The Heebee-jeebees performing at Olympic Plaza in Calgary, Alberta on November 17, 2007

The Heebee-jeebees are a Canadian a cappella quartet formed in 1993 in Calgary, Alberta, Canada. The Heebee-jeebees have released 9 recordings, all to international recognition including 4 CARA nominations and 2 CARA Awards. They have won the Canadian A Cappella Northern Harmony Championships twice, and have been named the inaugural inductee into the Northern Harmony Hall of Fame. The group often incorporates comedy and audience interaction into their performances.

Currently the band's lineup is Jonathan Love (tenor), Chris Herard (tenor), Ken Lima-Coelho (tenor), and Cédric Blary (bass).

== Discography ==
Albums are all independent releases on the Heebee-jeebees' own label "Guy Records".

- Hurry Up and Wait (1995)
- Waiting Under the Mistletoe (1997)
- Heebee-jeebee TV (2000)
- FALALALALA! (2001)
- Xmas Nuts (2004)
- Surgical Strike (2006)
- Christmas Crackers (2007)
- Swamp Mix! (2010)
- Best Before Christmas (2019)

== Awards ==
- 2008 First a Group inaugurated into the Canadian A Cappella Hall of Fame.
- 2004 - Pacific Northwest Regional Champions
- 1998 - First Place and Audience favourite at the Pacific North West Harmony Sweeps, becoming the first Canadian group to advance to the Sweeps finals.
- 2001 - First Place and Audience Favourite at Northern Harmony Canadian A Cappella Festival.
- 1999 - Second Place and Audience Favourite at Northern Harmony Canadian A Cappella Festival, and Best Original Song for "Use The Force".
- 1997 - First Place and Audience Favourite at Northern Harmony Canadian A Cappella Festival.

== See also ==
- The Heebee-jeebees' Official website
- Northern Harmony - The Canadian A Cappella Festival - Hall of Fame - The Heebee-jeebees were the inaugural inductee.
