= Tiggy =

Danish musical artist and radio host

Charlotte Vigel (born 1970), better known as Tiggy, is a Danish singer and radio host.

== Biography ==
Vigel was born and brought up in Bornholm. Due to her parents' great interest in amateur theatricals, she made her stage debut at the age of 10 years old. As a result of her theatre performances, she developed a great interest in dancing and this led to her taking part in a number of competitions all over Denmark as well as forming her own dance group.

When Vigel turned sixteen, she began to concentrate more on music. She became the lead singer in both a dance group and a rock band and performed at numerous concerts. She went on tour with Next Stop Soviet and took part in the Melodi Grand Prix competition of Danish weekly magazine Se og Hør, winning a place in the finals. After an open-air concert, Vigel was offered a record contract by a German producer from Hamburg.

In 1994, after a lot of encouragement to develop her singing talent more seriously, Vigel started taking lessons at a music school in Lund, Sweden. Shortly afterwards, she enrolled at the Copenhagen Academy of Music.

In 1995, Vigel attended an audition and was straight away taken on as member of a girl trio. In April that year, their single "Surprise Surprise" was released and the following month, the trio was invited to perform on Eleva2ren, a popular Danish TV entertainment programme. Vigel was offered the job of singer in the Danish Ny Teater production of the musical farce La Cage Aux Folles and ended up both singing and dancing as well as performing a small acting role. Carried away by working, Vigel went on to land an engagement in Betty Glosted's summer cabaret.

In 1996, Tiggy's collaboration with Danish label Flex Records started. This was in connection with the song "Ring A Ling", written by CMN a.k.a. Christian Møller Nielsen, Heidi Lykke Larsen and Henrik Carlsen and produced by Hartmann & Langhoff, who also worked with Aqua, Me & My and other bubblegum dance groups. The song was a smash hit, and shot to No. 1 on the official single sales list after only eight days after its release. The song went platinum in record time (less than a month) and stayed at No. 1 for 8 weeks.

The follow-up single "Simsalabim", again produced by Hartmann & Langhoff, was released on 16 April 1997 and followed in "Ring A Ling"'s success by hitting No. 1 on the sales list. Tiggy's debut album, Fairy Tales was released on 7 May 1997. The album also took Tiggy's music outside Denmark and Fairy Tales was released in several countries including Mexico, Japan, Spain, Belgium and Russia.

For years now, Vigel has been a solo singer on several soundtracks for Krumme (a popular Danish children's comedy film), and was also a soloist on Krummernes Jul (the Christmas version of the film series). She has also been the lead singer in several groups including Street Beat and Legend.

Vigel currently works as a radio host on Danish radio show Morgenhyrderne.

== Discography ==
=== Albums ===
- 1997 - Fairy Tales
- 1999 - Tiggy

=== Singles ===
| Year | Single | Peak chart positions | Album |
| Year | Single | DEN | Album |
|---|---|---|---|
| 1997 | "Ring-A-Ling" | 1 | Fairy Tales |
| 1997 | "Simsalabim" | 2 | Fairy Tales |
| 1997 | "Daddy Boom" | — | Fairy Tales |
| 1997 | "Why?" | 5 | Fairy Tales |
| 1998 | "Hooked on a Feeling" | — | Tiggy |
| 1998 | "Abracadabra" | — | Tiggy |
| 1998 | "Falling" | — | Tiggy |
"—" denotes releases that did not chart
