= FLEX Records =

- Parent company: Scandinavian Records; EMI
- Founded: 1994; 32 years ago
- Country of origin: Denmark

FLEX Records is a Danish record label. Label founded by Scandinavian Records in 1994 to release various electronic music (mainly - dance genres). It was sold to the Danish branch of the EMI group in 1996.

FX Records is a sublabel of FLEX Records which positions itself in ambient music.

== Past and present musicians ==
FLEX Records has signed many popular artists from multiple genres, including

- Aligator, DJ
- Baby D
- Baruch
- B.B.E.
- Cartoons
- Celvin Rotane
- Dado, DJ
- De Bos
- Dub Tractor
- Groovezone
- Heller 'N Farley Project
- Hypetraxx
- iiO
- Infernal
- Josh Wink
- Laid Back
- Little Jam
- Los Umbrellos
- Mo-Do
- Norman Bass
- Outhere Brothers, The
- Paul Johnson
- Ruffneck Featuring Yavahn
- Simpson Tune
- Sunzet Sunzation!
- Threesome Allstars, The
- Tiggy
- Tom Wilson
- Vincent De Moor
- Whigfield

== See also ==
- List of record labels
