= 1912 in music =

This is a list of notable events in music that took place in the year 1912.

== Specific locations ==
- 1912 in Norwegian music

== Specific genres ==
- 1912 in jazz

== Events ==
- February 28 – In a concert in Copenhagen, Carl Nielsen conducts the premiere of his Symphony No. 3 (the Sinfonia espansiva) and his Violin Concerto.
- March – Hart A. Wand publishes "Dallas Blues", a jazz standard and an early published blues song.
- June 26 – Gustav Mahler's Symphony No. 9 is premiered posthumously in Vienna by the Vienna Philharmonic Orchestra conducted by Bruno Walter.
- September – W. C. Handy publishes "The Memphis Blues", one of the first blues songs to become a hit.
- September 3 – Arnold Schoenberg's Five Pieces for Orchestra debuts at the Queen's Hall, London, at a Promenade Concert conducted by Henry Wood; it is hissed by the audience.
- October 16 – Arnold Schoenberg's Pierrot Lunaire debuts at the Berlin Choralion-Saal.
- Aino Ackté founds an opera festival in Savonlinna; after a period of dormancy, the Savonlinna Opera Festival will become one of the most important cultural events in Finland.
- The Birmingham Triennial Music Festival is held for the last time.
- William Henry Bell becomes director of the South African College of Music in Cape Town.

== Published popular music ==
- "After All That I've Been To You" w. Jack Drislane m. Chris Smith
- "Alexander's Ragtime Band" w.m. Irving Berlin, E. Ray Goetz, A. Baldwin Sloane
- "All Night Long" w.m. Shelton Brooks
- "And The Green Grass Grew All Around" w. William Jerome m. Harry Von Tilzer
- "At The Devil's Ball" w.m. Irving Berlin
- "Baby Seals Blues" m. Artie Matthews
- "Bagdad" w. Anne Caldwell m. Victor Herbert
- "Be My Little Baby Bumble Bee" w. Stanley Murphy m. Henry I. Marshall
- "Beans! Beans!! Beans!!!" w. Elmer Bowman m. Chris Smith
- "Becky's Got A Job In A Musical Show" w.m. Irving Berlin
- "Come Back To Me, My Melody" Irving Berlin, Ted Snyder
- "Daddy Has A Sweetheart (And Mother Is Her Name)" w. Gene Buck m. Dave Stamper
- "A Dinder Courtship" w. Fred E. Weatherly m. Eric Coates
- "Do It Again" w.m. Irving Berlin
- "Dreams Of Long Ago" w. Earl Carroll m. Enrico Caruso
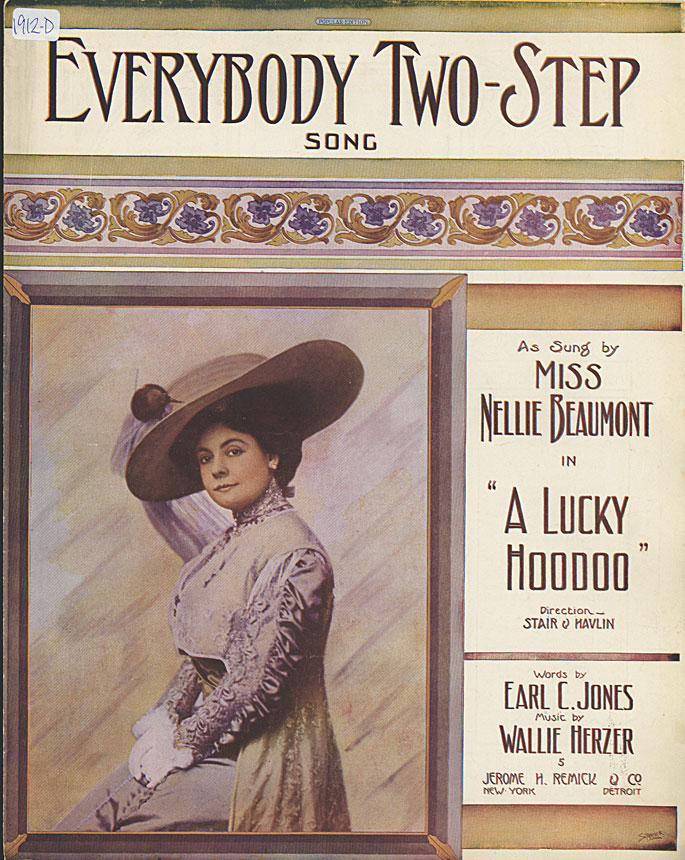
- "The Elevator Man Going Up, Going Up, Going Up, Going Up!" w.m. Irving Berlin
- "Everybody Two-Step" w. Earl C. Jones m. Wallie Herzer
- "The Funny Little Melody" w.m. Irving Berlin
- "Giannina Mia" w. Otto Harbach m. Rudolf Friml
- "He Played It On His Fid, Fid, Fiddle-dee-dee" w.m. E. Ray Goetz & Irving Berlin
- "Hitchy-Koo" w. L. Wolfe Gilbert m. Lewis F. Muir & Maurice Abrahams
- "I'm Afraid, Pretty Maid, I'm Afraid" w.m. Irving Berlin
- "I'm The Lonesomest Gal In Town" w. Lew Brown m. Albert Von Tilzer
- "In My Harem" w.m. Irving Berlin
- "In the Garden" w.m. C. Austin Miles
- "It's A Long Way To Tipperary" w.m. Jack Judge & Harry H. Williams
- "Keep Away From The Fellow Who Owns An Automobile" w.m. Irving Berlin
- "Kentucky Sue" by Lew Brown
- "Last Night Was The End Of The World" w. Andrew B. Sterling m. Harry Von Tilzer
- "The Last Shot Got Him" w.m. Cecil Mack & Cecil Smith
- "Lead Me To That Beautiful Band" w. E. Ray Goetz m. Irving Berlin from the musical theater production 'Cohan And Harris Minstrels'
- "A Little Love, A Little Kiss" w. (Fr) Nilson Fysher (Eng) Adrian Ross m. Leo Silesu
- "Love Is Like A Firefly" w. Otto Harbach m. Rudolf Friml
- "Melody" m. Charles Gates Dawes
- "The Memphis Blues" w. George A. Norton m. W. C. Handy
- "The Million Dollar Ball" Irving Berlin, E. Ray Goetz
- "My Melancholy Baby" w. George A. Norton m. Ernie Burnett
- "On A Beautiful Night With A Beautiful Girl" w. Will D. Cobb m. Gus Edwards

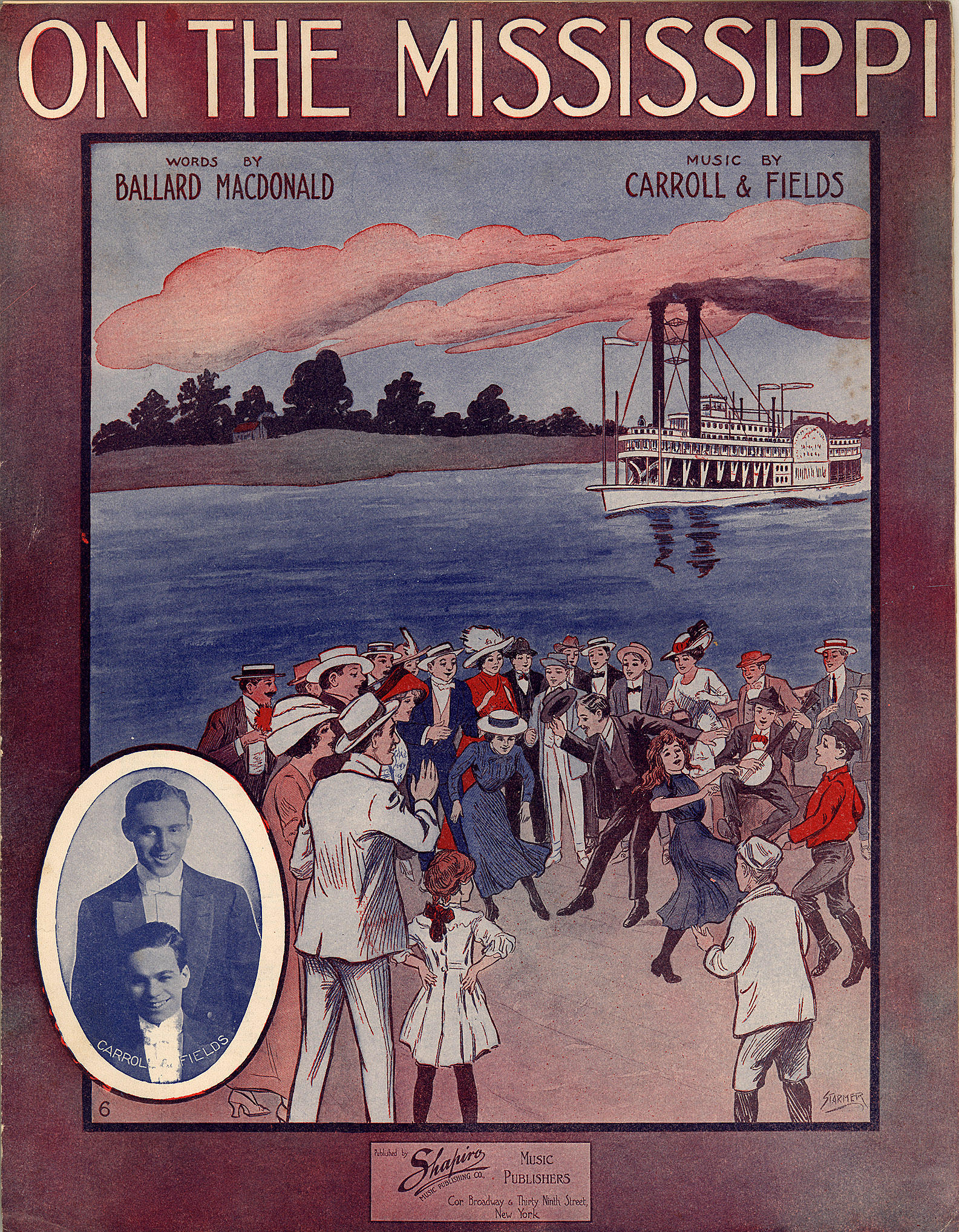

- "On The Mississippi" w. Ballard MacDonald m. Harry Carroll & Arthur Fields
- "Parisienne" w. Lew Brown m. Albert Von Tilzer
- "Pick, Pick, Pick Pick On The Mandolin, Antonio" w.m. Irving Berlin
- "Ragging The Baby To Sleep" w. L. Wolfe Gilbert m. Lewis F. Muir
- "Ragtime Cowboy Joe" w. Grant Clarke m. Lewis F. Muir & Maurice Abrahams
- "The Ragtime Jockey Man" w.m. Irving Berlin
- "Ragtime Mocking Bird" w.m. Irving Berlin
- "The Ragtime Soldier Man" w.m. Irving Berlin
- "The Rose of Tralee" w. C. Mordaunt Spencer m. Charles W. Glover
- "Row Row Row" w. William Jerome m. James V. Monaco
- "Sly Musette" w. Sydney Rosenfeld m. A. Baldwin Sloane
- "The Society Bear" w.m. Irving Berlin
- "Some Boy" w. Gene Buck m. Dave Stamper
- "Somebody's Coming To Town From Dixie" w. Raymond A. Browne m. Henry Clay Smith
- "The Sweetheart Of Sigma Chi" w. Byron D. Stokes m. F. Dudleigh Vernor
- "Sympathy" w. Otto Harbach m. Rudolf Friml
- "Take A Little Tip From Father" Irving Berlin, Ted Snyder
- "Take Me Back" w.m. Irving Berlin
- "Take Me To That Swanee Shore" w. L. Wolfe Gilbert m. Lewis F. Muir
- "Take Me To The Cabaret" w.m. William Dillon
- "That Eccentric Rag" m. J. Russel Robinson
- "That Old Girl Of Mine" w. Earle C. Jones m. Egbert van Alstyne
- "That's How I Need You" w. Joe McCarthy & Joe Goodwin m. Al Piantadosi
- "There's One In A Million Like You" w. Grant Clarke m. Jean Schwartz
- "Waiting For The Robert E. Lee" w. L. Wolfe Gilbert m. Lewis F. Muir
- "'Way Down South" w.m. George Fairman
- "The Wedding Glide" w.m. Louis Hirsch
- "A Wee Hoose 'Mang The Heather" w.m Gilbert Wells, Fred Elton & Harry Lauder
- "When I Get You Alone Tonight" w.m. Joseph McCarthy, Joe Goodwin & Fred Fisher
- "When I Lost You" w.m. Irving Berlin
- "When Irish Eyes Are Smiling" w. Chauncey Olcott & George Graff Jr m. Ernest R. Ball
- "When The Midnight Choo-Choo Leaves For Alabam" w.m. Irving Berlin
- "When Uncle Joe Plays A Rag On His Old Banjo" w.m. Theodore F. Morse
- "Yiddisha Professor" w.m. Irving Berlin
- "You're My Baby" w. A Seymour Brown m. Nat D. Ayer

== Popular recordings ==
- "The Herd Girl's Dream" by George Stehl, Marshall P. Lufsky, & Paul Surth, Columbia
- "Everybody Two Step" by Billy Murray, Edison
- "The Floral Dance" by Peter Dawson (bass-baritone)
- "Roamin' in the Gloamin'" by Harry Lauder, Victor

== Classical music ==
- Hugo Alfvén –
  - Mostellaria, for flute (incidental music for the play by Plautus)
  - Julsång, for voice and piano
  - Spåmannen (incidental music for the play by Verner von Heidenstam), for chorus and small orchestra
  - Unge Herr Sten Sture, Op. 30, for baritone, male choir, and orchestra
- Granville Bantock – In the Far West, serenade for string orchestra
- Alban Berg – Five Orchestral Songs on Picture-Postcard Texts by Peter Altenberg
- Frank Bridge
  - 4 Short Pieces for Violin and Piano, H.104
  - Piano Quintet
- Max Bruch – Concerto for Two Pianos and Orchestra
- Ferruccio Busoni
  - Nocturne symphonique, Op. 43, BV 262
  - Sonatina No. 2
- George Butterworth – A Shropshire Lad
- John Alden Carpenter –
  - The Cock Shall Crow, for voice and piano
  - Poems by Paul Verlaine (Four), for voice and piano
  - Songs (Eight), for medium voice and piano
- Carlos Chávez –
  - Miniatura for piano
  - Valsas I y II for piano
- Claude Debussy
  - Gigues
  - Khamma (ballet)
  - Preludes, Book 2
- Frederick Delius
  - The Song of the High Hills
  - On Hearing the First Cuckoo in Spring
- Paul Dukas – La Peri (ballet)
- Edward Elgar – The Music Makers
- George Enescu – Sonatensatz in F♯ minor, for piano
- Victor Ewald – Brass Quintet No. 1
- Philippe Gaubert – Fantaisie for Flute and Piano
- Alexander Glazunov
  - Piano Concerto No.1, Op.92
  - Finnish Sketches
- Percy Grainger – Handel in the Strand
- Swan Hennessy
  - En Passant, Op.40
  - Valses caprices, Op.41
  - Sonatine, Op.43
  - 3 Pièces Celtiques, Op.45
- Joseph Holbrooke – Nocturne: "Fairyland", Op. 57, for oboe, clarinet (or viola), and piano
- Arthur Honegger – Sonata in D minor, for violin and piano
- Charles Ives – Robert Browning Overture
- Leoš Janáček
  - The Fiddler's Child for orchestra
  - V mlhách (In the Mists) for piano
- Manolis Kalomiris –
  - Iamvoi ke anapaestoi II: Mayovotana, for voice and orchestra
  - Quintet, for piano and strings, with voice
- Sigfrid Karg-Elert –
  - Chorale Improvisations (Four), for organ
  - Funerale, for harmonium
  - Prae- und Postludien (20), Op. 78, for organ
  - Triumph, Op. 79, for unaccompanied chorus
  - Vom Himmel hoch, chorale canzona, Op. 82, No. 2, for chorus, violin, and organ
- Anatoly Lyadov – Iz Apokalipsisa, Op. 66, for orchestra
- Gian Francesco Malipiero –
  - Arione, symphonic poem for cello and orchestra
  - Danze e canzoni, for orchestra
- Bohuslav Martinů –
  - Andante, for string quartet
  - Ave Maria, for soprano and organ
  - Niponari, for soprano and orchestra
  - Nocturnes (Two), for string quartet
  - Offertorium, for soprano and organ
  - Phantasie, for violin and piano
  - String Quartet
- Arnold Mendelssohn –
  - Auf meinen lieben Gott, Op. 61, for solo voices, chorus, organ, and orchestra
  - Aus tiefer Not, Op. 54, for soprano, chorus, organ, and orchestra
- Moritz Moszkowski – Grande valse de concert, Op.88
- Carl Nielsen –
  - Paraphrase over ‘Naermere Gud til dig’, for wind orchestra
  - Sonata No. 2, Op. 35, for violin and piano
- Leo Ornstein – A Paris Street Scene at Night, Op. 4, No. 3, for piano
- Otakar Ostrčil –
  - Česká legenda vánoční, Op. 15, for male chorus
  - Suite in C minor, Op. 14, for orchestra
- Gabriel Pierné – Saint François d'Assise, oratorio
- Ildebrando Pizzetti –
  - Il clefta prigione, for voice and piano
  - San Basilio, for voice and piano
- Sergei Prokofiev
  - Piano Concerto No. 1 in D♭ Major
  - Piano Concerto No. 2 in G Minor
- Roger Quilter –
  - Moonlight on the Lake, for piano
  - Where the Rainbow Ends: Suite, for piano
- Sergei Rachmaninoff – Songs (14), Op. 34
- Maurice Ravel – Daphnis et Chloé
- Max Reger –
  - "An die Hoffnung", Op. 124, for contralto (or mezzo-soprano) and orchestra (or piano)
  - Aus meinem Tagebuch, Op. 85, 35 little pieces for piano
  - Geistliche Gesänge, Op. 110, for chorus
  - Konzert im alten Stil in F major, Op. 123, for orchestra
  - Preludes and Fugues, Op. 117, for violin solo
  - Eine romantische Suite, Op. 125, for orchestra
  - Römischer Triumphgesang, Op. 126, for male voices and orchestra
- Henriette Renié – Ballade fantastique for harp
- Erik Satie –
  - Aperçus désagréables, for piano duet
  - Préludes flasques (pour un chien), for piano
  - Préludes pour un chien (2), for piano
  - Véritables préludes flasques (pour un chien), for piano
- Philipp Scharwenka – String Quartet No.2, Op.120
- Arnold Schoenberg – Pierrot Lunaire
- Cyril Scott – Two Passacaglias
- Alexander Scriabin
  - Poème-Nocturne, Op.61
  - Piano Sonata No.6, Op.62
  - 2 Poèmes, Op.63
  - Piano Sonata No.7, Op.64
  - 3 Études, Op. 65
- Rudi Stephan
  - Musik für 7 Saiteninstrumente, Op.16
  - Musik fur Orchester
- Richard Strauss – Der Bürger als Edelmann (first version, as incidental music for Hugo von Hofmannsthal's translation of Molière's play)
- Igor Stravinsky – Le roi des étoiles
- Marcel Tournier – Promenade a l'automne
- Louis Vierne – Symphony for Organ No. 3 in F♯ minor
- Heitor Villa-Lobos –
  - Brinquedo de Roda, for piano
  - Petizada, for piano
  - Suite infantil No. 1, for piano
  - Suite popular brasileira, for guitar
- Egon Wellesz
  - 5 Kirschblütenlieder, Op. 8
  - 3 Tänze for piano, Op. 10
  - Vorfrühling for orchestra, Op. 12
- Charles-Marie Widor – Suite for cello and piano
- Alberto Williams – Danzas argentinas–milongas (5), for orchestra
- Kōsaku Yamada
  - Overture in D major
  - Symphony in F major "Triumph and Peace"

== Opera ==
- Eugen d'Albert –
  - Die verschenkte Frau (Vienna, 6 February)
  - Liebesketten (Vienna, 12 November)
- Walter Damrosch – The Dove of Peace
- Joseph Holbrooke – The Children of Don, Op. 56 (London, 12 June)
- Otakar Ostrčil – Poupě (The Bud), Op. 12 (Prague, National Theatre, 25 January)
- Guy Ropartz – Le Pays
- Richard Strauss – Ariadne auf Naxos
- Franz Schreker – Der ferne Klang
- Ferruccio Busoni – Die Brautwahl

== Ballet ==
- Maurice Ravel - Daphnis et Chloé premieres at the Théâtre du Châtelet in Paris by his Ballets Russes

== Musical theater ==
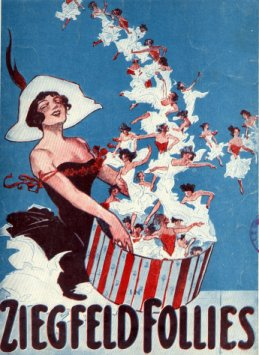
Promotional artwork for 1912 Ziegfeld Follies

- The Count of Luxembourg Broadway production opened at the New Amsterdam Theatre on September 16 and ran for 120 performances.
- The Firefly, music by Rudolf Friml, Broadway production opened at the Lyric Theatre on December 2 and ran for 120 performances
- Forty-Five Minutes From Broadway Broadway revival opened at the George M. Cohan Theatre on March 14 and ran for 36 performances.
- Gypsy Love (musical) London production opened at Daly's Theatre on June 1 and ran for 299 performances.
- Hullo, Rag-time! Opened at the London Hippodrome on December 23 and ran for 451 performances.
- The Lady of the Slipper Broadway production opened at the Globe Theatre on October 28 and ran for 232 performances. Starring Elsie Janis, Montgomery and Stone, James Reaney, Peggy Wood and Vernon Castle.
- Der Lila Domino (The Lilac Domino) – Vienna production
- Mama's Baby Boy (Music: Hans Linne Book & Lyrics: Junie McCree) Broadway production opened at the Broadway Theatre on May 25 and ran for 9 performances
- Oh! Oh! Delphine! Broadway production opened at the Knickerbocker Theatre on September 30 and ran for 248 performances
- Over the River (Words & Music: John Golden) Broadway production opened at the Globe Theatre on January 8 and ran for 120 performances. Starring Eddie Foy, Lillian Lorraine, Mae Busch, Peggy Wood and Maurice and Walton.
- The Pink Lady London production opened at the Globe Theatre on April 11 and ran for 124 performances
- Under Many Flags Broadway production opened at the Hippodrome on August 31 and ran for 445 performances
- The Wall Street Girl Broadway production opened at the George M. Cohan Theatre on April 15 and ran for 56 performances
- The Ziegfeld Follies Of 1912, Broadway revue opened at the Moulin Rouge Theatre on October 21 and ran for 88 performances

== Births ==
- January 4 – Noro Morales, Puerto Rican pianist and bandleader (died 1964)
- January 7 – Günter Wand, German conductor and composer (died 2002)
- January 8 – Arkady Filippenko, composer (died 1983)
- January 11 – Emiliano Zuleta, vallenato composer, accordion player and singer (died 2005)
- February 2 – Burton Lane, US composer (died 1997)
- February 8 – Ilona Steingruber, Austrian soprano (died 1962)
- February 11 – Rudolf Firkušný, pianist (died 1994)
- February 19 – Saul Chaplin, film score composer and arranger (died 1997)
- February 27 – Eliška Kleinová, pianist and music teacher (died 1999)
- March 11 – Xavier Montsalvatge, composer and music critic (died 2002)
- March 14 – Les Brown, US bandleader (died 2001)
- March 15 – Lightnin' Hopkins, blues musician (died 1982)
- March 24 – Sari Biro, pianist (died 1990)
- March 27 – Robert Hughes, composer (died 2007)
- April 2 – Herbert Mills of the Mills Brothers singing quartet (died 1989)
- April 7 – Jack Lawrence, American composer (died 2009)
- April 5 – Carlos Guastavino, composer (died 2000)
- April 17 – Marta Eggerth, singer and actress (died 2013)
- April 22 – Kathleen Ferrier, contralto (died 1953)
- April 24 – Renato Cellini, conductor (died 1967)
- May 3 – Virgil Fox, American organist (died 1980)
- May 10 – Adrian Aeschbacher, Swiss pianist (died 2002)
- May 13 – Gil Evans, Canadian-born American jazz pianist and bandleader (died 1988)
- May 18 – Perry Como, American singer (died 2001)
- May 20 – Edgar Bischoff, Romanian-born French composer (died 1995)
- May 23
  - Jean Françaix, French composer (died 1997)
  - William Vacchiano, American trumpeter (d. 2005)
- May 31 – Alfred Deller, English singer (died 1979)
- June 6 – Robert Levin, pianist (died 1996)
- June 9
  - Edgar Evans, operatic tenor (died 2007)
  - Buddy Feyne, lyricist and composer (d. 1998)
- June 15 – Oscar Natzka, New Zealand opera singer (d. 1951)
- June 17 – Don Gillis, conductor and composer (died 1978))
- June 28 – Eleazar de Carvalho, conductor and composer (died 1996)
- July 4 – Fritz Schulz-Reichel, jazz pianist (died 1990)
- July 5
  - Mack David, songwriter (died 1993)
  - Ilona Massey, actress and singer (died 1974)
- July 14 – Woody Guthrie, folk singer (died 1967)
- July 16 – Amy Patterson, Argentine composer, singer, poet, and teacher (died 2019)
- July 17 – Irene Manning, actress and singer (died 2004)
- July 27 – Igor Markevitch, composer (died 1983)
- August 9 – Anne Brown, US soprano, first Bess in Porgy and Bess (died 2009)
- August 13 – Francesco Albanese, operatic tenor (died 2005)
- August 20 – Niyazi, conductor and composer (died 1984)
- August 21 – Natalia Dudinskaya, ballerina (died 2003)
- August 23 – Gene Kelly, dancer, singer and actor (died 1996)
- August 26 – Léo Marjane, born Thérèse Maria Léonie Gendebien, popular singer (died 2016)
- September 5 – John Cage, American composer (died 1992)
- September 19 – Kurt Sanderling, German conductor (died 2011)
- September 21 – György Sándor, Hungarian pianist (died 2005)
- September 26 – René Hall, American guitarist and arranger (died 1988)
- September 27 – Tauno Marttinen, Finnish composer (died 2008)
- September 29 – Beryl Wallace, American singer, dancer and actress (died 1948)
- September 30 – Kenny Baker, American singer and actor (died 1985)
- October 7 – Joseph Cooper, pianist and broadcaster (died 2001)
- October 15 – Nellie Lutcher, jazz singer and pianist (died 2007)
- October 21
  - Don Byas, jazz musician (died 1972)
  - Sir Georg Solti, conductor (died 1997)
- October 24 – Peter Gellhorn, pianist, conductor and composer (died 2004)
- October 27 – Conlon Nancarrow, composer (died 1997)
- November 4 – Vadim Salmanov, Russian composer (died 1978)
- November 6 – King Kolax, jazz trumpeter (died 1991)
- November 11 – Larry LaPrise, creator of the "Hokey-Pokey" or "Hokey-Cokey" song and dance (died 1996)
- November 18 – Jimmy Swan, country musician (died 1995)
- November 21 – Eleanor Powell, dancer (died 1982)
- November 22 – Chick Henderson, singer (died 1944)
- November 29 – Viola Smith, American drummer (died 2020)
- November 30 – Hugo del Carril, actor and tango singer (died 1989)
- December 7 – Daniel Jones, composer (died 1993)
- December 10 – Irving Fazola, jazz clarinetist (died 1949)
- December 13 – Luiz Gonzaga, folk singer and songwriter (died 1989)
- December 23 – Josef Greindl, operatic bass (died 1993)
- December 24 – Natalino Otto, Italian singer (died 1969)
- December 28 – Yuri Levitin, Ukrainian composer (died 1993)
- December 29 - Peggy Glanville-Hicks, Australian composer (died 1990)
- December 30 – Rosina Lawrence, actress, singer and dancer (died 1997)
- probable – Merline Johnson, blues singer (died)

== Deaths ==
- January 3 – Harald Scharff, ballet dancer, 75
- January 30 – Florence St. John, singer and actress, 56
- February 15 – Hermann Necke, composer, 61
- March 1 – George Grossmith, comic singer in operetta, 64
- March 17 – Domenico Mustafà, castrato singer and composer, 82
- March 30 – Lina Ramann, biographer of Liszt, 78
- April 15 – Sinking of the RMS Titanic:
  - Wallace Hartley, ship's bandleader and violinist, 33
  - John Law Hume, ship's violinist, 21
- April 30 – František Kmoch, conductor and composer, 63
- May 18 – Marie von Schleinitz, arts patron (born 1842)
- May 19 – Alphonse Hasselmans, harpist (born 1845)
- June 6 – Giulio Ricordi, music publisher, 71
- July 21
  - Antonio Magini-Coletti, operatic baritone, 57
  - Gerrit Smith, composer and organist
- August 13 – Jules Massenet, composer, 70
- August 14 – Marion Hood, singer, 58
- August 30 – Eleanora Ehrenbergů, operatic soprano, 79
- September 1 – Samuel Coleridge-Taylor, composer, 37 (pneumonia)
- October 1 – Frances Allitsen, composer, 63
- October 3 – Guido Papini, violinist and composer, 65
- October 15 –
  - Thomas P. Fenner, conductor, music educator, and folk song collector, 82
  - Max Spicker, conductor and composer, 54
- October 19 – Richard Temple, opera singer, 66
- October 24
  - Mykola Lysenko, pianist, composer and conductor, 70
  - Bernardine Hamaekers, Belgian opera singer, 76
- October 30 – Jan Gall, composer and music teacher, 56
- November 10 – Riccardo Antoniazzi, violin maker, 58
- November 11 – Józef Wieniawski, pianist, conductor and composer, 75
- November 24 – Eugene S. Bonelli, founder of the Grand Conservatory of Music in San Francisco, composer, and pianist
- December 15 – Franz Simandl, double bassist, 72
- date unknown
  - Auguste von Müller, singer and actress (born 1848)
  - Emma Seehofer, operatic contralto
