= Jaws (soundtrack) =

1975 film score by John Williams

Jaws: Original Motion Picture Soundtrack
- The three releases of the soundtrack conducted by John Williams feature Roger Kastel's iconic painting

Film score by John Williams
- Released: 1975
- Recorded: March 1975
- Studios: 20th Century Fox Studios Scoring Stage (Los Angeles, CA)
- Genres: Soundtrack, Classical
- Length: 35:12
- Label: MCA Records

John Williams chronology
None but the Brave (1965)	Jaws: Original Motion Picture Soundtrack (1975)	Family Plot (1976)

The Jaws soundtrack (officially Jaws: Original Motion Picture Soundtrack) is the music composed and conducted by John Williams and performed by the Hollywood Studio Symphony for Steven Spielberg's 1975 film Jaws. The soundtrack is particularly notable for the 2-note ostinato which represents the shark, a theme so simple that Spielberg initially thought it was a joke by the composer.

The film score was recorded in March 1975 at 20th Century Fox Studios and Universal. Williams then expanded and rearranged the cues for the commercial release to provide a more cohesive listening experience. The soundtrack album was released on LP by MCA in 1975, reaching number 32 on the Billboard charts in September 1975. There have been several other re-releases, including re-recordings and anniversary expanded editions featuring alternate takes and source material.

The soundtrack was critically well received, winning the Academy Award for Best Original Score, the Golden Globe Award for Best Original Score and Grammy Award for Best Score Soundtrack for Visual Media. In addition, it was ranked the sixth greatest score by the American Film Institute. The score has been the subject of scholarly discussion in relation to the tradition of classical Hollywood scoring, and its role in creating space in the film.

== Development ==
John Williams had previously scored Steven Spielberg's debut feature, The Sugarland Express, and he would go on to collaborate with the director on almost all of his subsequent films. Spielberg had used Williams' title theme from Robert Altman's 1972 psychological horror film Images as a temp track during the editing of Jaws. When Williams first demonstrated his idea to Spielberg, playing just the two notes on a piano, Spielberg was said to have laughed, thinking that it was a joke as he was expecting a more "melodic" tune. Williams responded, explaining "the sophisticated approach you would like me to take isn't the approach you took with the film I just experienced." After hearing the notes played again and at different speeds, Spielberg agreed, saying that "sometimes the best ideas are the most simple ones" and that the composer "had found a signature for the entire score." The main "shark" theme is an ostinato, a simple alternating pattern between E and F, with an ascending minor second in the low strings.

The ostinato became a classic piece of suspense music, synonymous with approaching danger (see leading-tone). Williams described the theme as "grinding away at you, just as a shark would do, instinctual, relentless, unstoppable." Elaborating on the simplicity, Williams said that he felt that the motif should be "brainless... like the shark." Williams recognised the "primal, but fun and entertaining" similarities between Jaws and pirate movies, which inspired him to evoke "pirate music" within the score. The primal opening notes are developed from the opening foreboding tone of Ravel's La valse. Calling for rapid, percussive string playing, the score also contains echoes of Debussy's La mer, Stravinsky's The Rite of Spring, and the opening of the 4th movement of Dvořák's New World Symphony.

== Recording ==
Recording the film score for Jaws started on March 3, 1975. A large stage was required to accommodate a full orchestra; as Universal's stages were unavailable, the first two days were recorded at the Fox Scoring Stage in Los Angeles. The film's producer, Richard D. Zanuck secretly watched a recording session from the sidelines. Grammy-award winning Theodore Keep was the sound engineer, and musicians included guitarist Tommy Tedesco, trumpet player Malcolm McNab and percussionists Shelly Manne and Emil Richards. The main ostinato was performed by tuba player Tommy Johnson. When asked by Johnson why the melody was written in such a high register and not played by the more appropriate French horn, Williams explained that he wanted it to sound "a little more threatening".

On March 5, recording moved to Stage 10 at Universal Studios because it was more appropriate for "stringless" (percussion, tuba, and brass, etc.) recording for the diegetic music played by the Amity marching band early in the film, including tunes by Scott Joplin, Johann Strauss II alongside original compositions by Williams. Because the town band was meant to sound like amateur musicians, Spielberg himself was enlisted to play clarinet slightly out of tune to give an amateur feel.

When test audiences commended the music on comment cards at the previews of the film in Dallas, Texas and Long Beach, California (on March 26 and 28 respectively), it was decided to produce a soundtrack album. As with Williams' usual preference for rearranging and re-recording his soundtracks for a commercial album release, he developed some of the Jaws cues to "make a more cohesive listening experience, so... he expanded and rearranged the highlights of the Jaws score for album presentation." Those tracks were recorded on April 17–18, 1975 at The Burbank Studios in California. In the booklet supplied with the 50th anniversary release, Mike Matessino outlines the differences between the two recordings, such as combining cues to create a symphonic piece, and bringing the End Title to a more "satisfying ending". For example, the music in the beach montage sequence lasts for 1:30 in the film, whereas it is expanded to 2:46 on the soundtrack album.

== Reception ==
=== Reviews ===
Professional ratings
Review scores
Source	Rating
AllMusic	5/5 stars
Empire	5/5 stars
Filmtracks	5/5 stars
SoundtrackNet	5/5 stars
Tracksounds	8/10 stars

The original soundtrack album reached number 32 on the Billboard chart in September 1975. Writing for Empire, Ian Freer called the short length of the original 1975 soundtrack album ("a paltry 35 minutes") as "one of the most heinous crimes in the history of motion picture soundtrack albums." In a five-star review of the 2000 Decca Records release, Freer highlights the inclusion of previously unreleased material, the liner notes from Spielberg and Williams, commending this collector's edition as "the last word in Jaws musicology."

Although Filmtracks acknowledges the role of the music within the context of the film, and its place in "the history of film music", it is less positive about it in album form. They write, "Jaws is not something you can sit and listen to for any great length of time. Study and admire its constructs and intelligent application, but don't expect it to freely entertain without forcing you into a more contemplative analysis of its purpose."

=== Awards and accolades ===
John Williams won several awards for the Jaws soundtrack. In March 1976, he won a GRAMMY, a BAFTA, and the Academy Award for Best Original Score. The score won the Golden Globe Award for Best Original Score at the 33rd Golden Globe Awards.

In 2005, the American Film Institute ranked Jaws sixth in its 100 Years of Film Scores, a list of the top 25 film scores in American cinema.

=== Scholarly analysis ===
There are various interpretations of the meaning and effectiveness of the primary music theme, which is widely described as one of the most recognizable cinematic themes of all time. Music scholar Joseph Cancellaro proposes that the two-note expression mimics the shark's heartbeat. According to Alexandre Tylski, the shark theme suggests human respiration, comparable to the themes Bernard Herrmann which wrote for Taxi Driver, North by Northwest and Mysterious Island. Tylski further argues that the score's strongest motif is actually "the split, the rupture"—when it dramatically cuts off, as after Chrissie's death. The relationship between sound and silence is also taken advantage of in the way the audience is conditioned to associate the shark with its theme, which is exploited toward the film's climax when the shark suddenly appears with no musical introduction.

Music scholar Emilio Audissino writes, "Williams came up with the primitive rhythmic simplicity of an ostinato... those three repeated bass notes recall the heartbeat, the primordial rhythm of life. Their seemingly unstoppable constant and mechanical repetition effectively represents the shark." In the film, ostinato represents the shark. Audissino points out that Williams "plays fair" by only using the leitmotif when the shark is genuinely present; for instance, it is not used in the panic sequence on the beach which transpires to have been caused by boys with a fake fin. The leitmotif's adaptable tempo is an example of Mickey Mousing, whereby the music replicates the action on, and in this case off, screen. Audissino also highlights that the score reflects the contrasting worlds of humans and the shark. The humans, "lit by the sun", are represented by melodies with "bright tibres of violins, flutes and trumpets", whereas the shark's music is "low pitched, mechanical, with dark timbre".

=== Legacy ===
Spielberg later said that without Williams's score the film would have been only half as successful. Similar to the film, the music influenced perceptions of sharks, with some scholars claiming that such perceptions can compromise shark conservation efforts. Film composers including M. M. Keeravani and Anna Meredith have also cited the simplicity of the Jaws theme as an inspiration upon their own work.

Although he had previously won an Academy Award for Fiddler on the Roof, Williams says that the film 'jump-started' his career. Williams went on to work on the film's sequel, Jaws 2. Although the bulk of the score for Jaws 2 was original, Williams retained the shark's motif, which he says is in "the great tradition" for repeating musical themes in Hollywood serials such as Roy Rogers and The Lone Ranger. Alan Parker and Michael Small incorporated the main shark theme into both of their scores for Jaws 3-D and Jaws The Revenge respectively, with due credit to Williams. I.Q. Hunter highlights Small's score for Jaws The Revenge as "effective variations on John Williams’ classic theme".

The shark theme has become highly recognizable. As scholar Amanda Howell says, "the widely reproduced and widely recognised leitmotif ... ultimately achieved a life of its own beyond the haunted waters of the film -- and well past the classical score's aesthetic of audibility." It has been used in several other films for comic effect. Spielberg himself used it in a sequence in his comedy 1941, which spoofed the opening scene of Jaws, with actor Susan Backlinie being attacked by a submarine. It is also used in the opening of the comedy Airplane!, when it transpires that what appears to be a shark's fin is the tail fin of an airplane. The Spielberg-produced Back to the Future Part II uses the theme in a sequence set in the then-future 2015, when Marty McFly (Michael J. Fox) comes across a cinema showing Jaws 19. The animated films Finding Nemo and Shark Tale both use the music, often as part of a comment, Matthew Lerberg argues, about restoring the negative representation of Great Whites created by Spielberg's film. Characters in Finding Nemo hum the theme for Bruce the shark, while Shark Tale opens with Williams' theme.

== Releases ==
The original soundtrack for Jaws was released by MCA Records on LP in 1975, and as a CD in 1992, including roughly a half hour of music that Williams reimagined for the album. In 2000, two versions of the score were released. Decca/Universal reissued the soundtrack album to coincide with the release of the 25th-anniversary DVD, featuring the 51 minutes of the original score with a new stereo mix, derived from the surviving three-track film masters with the application of surround reverb and noise reduction to eliminate defects. Varèse Sarabande also released a rerecording of the score performed by the Royal Scottish National Orchestra, conducted by Joel McNeely.

In 2015, Intrada Records released a special edition of the soundtrack, featuring recordings of the film versions of the cues, the remastered original 1975 soundtrack album, and also the diegetic music played by the Amity town band. Intrada transferred the original three-track split mono to 24-bit resolution. However, it became apparent that this element was never intended to be mixed into true stereo. Because the film music was recorded at Fox Studios rather than Universal, the recording format was closer to what would later become industry standard. In 2025, to commemorate the film's 50th anniversary, Intrada released a three-CD set, again featuring the original soundtrack recording, including a few cues that weren't used in the final cut, the original soundtrack album, and additional source music. Also in 2025, a 50th anniversary remastered edition was released digitally by Back Lot Music and on vinyl by Mondo.

The cover of the four releases recorded by Williams (1975, 2000, 2015, 2025) features the painting from the original film poster, often described as "iconic", by artist Roger Kastel, whereas the McNeely release features a photograph of a shark.

== Track listings ==
=== 1975 MCA Records album ===
No.	Title	Length
1.	"Main Title (Theme From 'Jaws')"	2:18
2.	"Chrissie's Death"	1:39
3.	"Promenade (Tourists on the Menu)"	2:46
4.	"Out to Sea"	2:26
5.	"The Indianapolis Story"	2:23
6.	"Sea Attack Number One"	5:23
7.	"One Barrel Chase"	3:04
8.	"Preparing the Cage"	3:23
9.	"Night Search"	3:29
10.	"The Underwater Siege"	2:31
11.	"Hand to Hand Combat"	2:32
12.	"End Title (Theme From 'Jaws')"	2:18

=== 2000 Varèse Sarabande re-recording ===
Conducted by Joel McNeely

No.	Title	Length
1.	"Main Title"	1:06
2.	"The First Victim"	1:43
3.	"The Empty Raft"	1:15
4.	"The Pier Incident"	2:19
5.	"Father And Son"	2:19
6.	"The Alimentary Canal"	2:02
7.	"Ben Gardner's Boat"	3:21
8.	"Montage"	1:31
9.	"A Tug On The Line"	2:12
10.	"Into the Estuary"	2:49
11.	"Out to Sea"	0:56
12.	"Man Against Beast"	5:15
13.	"Quint's Tale"	2:30
14.	"Brody Panics"	1:16
15.	"Barrel Off Starboard"	1:38
16.	"The Great Chase"	3:02
17.	"Three Barrels Under"	2:05
18.	"From Bad to Worse"	0:53
19.	"Quint Thinks it Over"	1:08
20.	"The Shark Cage Fugue"	2:00
21.	"The Shark Approaches"	0:42
22.	"The Shark Hits the Cage"	1:45
23.	"Quint Meets his End"	1:08
24.	"Blown to Bits"	3:11
25.	"End Title"	1:56

=== 2000 Decca Records album ===
No.	Title	Length
1.	"Main Title and First Victim**"	3:27
2.	"The Empty Raft*"	1:23
3.	"The Pier Incident*"	2:23
4.	"The Shark Cage Fugue"	1:59
5.	"Shark Attack*†"	1:17
6.	"Ben Gardner's Boat"	3:31
7.	"Montage"	1:31
8.	"Father and Son*†"	3:42
9.	"Into the Estuary*"	2:50
10.	"Out to Sea"	2:58
11.	"Man Against Beast"	5:33
12.	"Quint's Tale"	2:40
13.	"Brody Panics*"	1:10
14.	"Barrel Off Starboard*"	1:30
15.	"The Great Shark Chase**†"	3:28
16.	"Three Barrels Under*†"	2:05
17.	"Between Attacks*†"	2:06
18.	"The Shark Approaches**"	2:40
19.	"Blown to Bits"	3:03
20.	"End Titles"	1:52

* = Previously unreleased
** = Includes unreleased music
† = Includes music not used in the film

=== 2015 Intrada Records 2CD release ===
==== Disc 1 ====
The Film Score (Remastered)
No.	Title	Length
1.	"Jaws – Main Title"	0:59
2.	"The First Victim"	1:45
3.	"Remains On The Beach"	0:59
4.	"The Empty Raft (Extended Version)"	1:45
5.	"The Pier Incident"	2:30
6.	"Father And Son (Film Version)"	1:59
7.	"The Alimentary Canal"	1:58
8.	"Ben Gardner's Boat"	3:33
9.	"Montage"	1:35
10.	"Into The Estuary"	2:53
11.	"Out To Sea (Film Version)"	1:01
12.	"Tug On The Line"	2:39
13.	"Man Against Beast (Film Version)"	5:34
14.	"Quint's Tale"	2:48
15.	"Brody Panics"	1:16
16.	"Barrel Off Starboard"	1:41
17.	"Great Chase"	3:02
18.	"Shark Tows Orca"	0:41
19.	"Three Barrels Under"	2:17
20.	"From Bad To Worse"	1:07
21.	"Quint Thinks It Over"	1:14
22.	"The Shark Cage Fugue"	2:02
23.	"The Shark Approaches (Film Version)"	0:53
24.	"The Shark Hits The Cage"	2:03
25.	"Quint Meets His End"	1:27
26.	"Blown To Bits"	3:17
27.	"Jaws – End Title"	1:57

The Extras
No.	Title	Length
28.	"Jaws – Main Title (Alternate)"	1:12
29.	"The Typewriter (Unused)"	0:21
30.	"Man Against Beast (Alternate)"	5:38
31.	"Barrel Off Starboard (Alternate Segment)"	0:54
32.	"Great Chase (Alternate)"	3:03
33.	"Shark Tows Orca (Alternate)"	0:42
34.	"The Shark Approaches (Alternate)"	0:55
35.	"Quint Meets His End (Alternate)"	1:32
36.	"Wild Shark Theme"	1:10

==== Disc 2 ====
1975 MCA Records album (Remastered)
No.	Title	Length
1.	"Main Title (Theme From 'Jaws')"	2:18
2.	"Chrissie's Death"	1:39
3.	"Promenade (Tourists on the Menu)"	2:46
4.	"Out to Sea"	2:26
5.	"The Indianapolis Story"	2:23
6.	"Sea Attack Number One"	5:23
7.	"One Barrel Chase"	3:04
8.	"Preparing the Cage"	3:23
9.	"Night Search"	3:29
10.	"The Underwater Siege"	3:31
11.	"Hand to Hand Combat"	2:32
12.	"End Title (Theme From 'Jaws')"	2:18

The Extras Music From Amity Town Beach
No.	Title	Length
13.	"Joplin Rag (Original Rags)" (composed by Scott Joplin)	2:07
14.	"Winter Stories Waltz" (composed by Alphons Czibulka)	1:46
15.	"In The Good Old Summertime" (composed by George Evans & Ren Shields)	1:29
16.	"Thousand And One Nights Waltz" (composed by Johann Strauss Jr.)	1:49
17.	"Marching Band No. 1"	1:09
18.	"Marching Band No. 2"	2:05

=== 2025 Intrada Records 3CD release ===
==== Disc 1 ====
Original Motion Picture Score
No.	Title	Length
1.	"Jaws – Main Title"	0:57
2.	"The First Victim"	1:46
3.	"Remains On The Beach"	0:59
4.	"The Empty Raft"	1:44
5.	"The Pier Incident"	2:30
6.	"Father And Son"	1:59
7.	"The Alimentary Canal"	1:58
8.	"Ben Gardner's Boat"	3:33
9.	"Tourist Montage"	1:35
10.	"Into The Estuary"	2:53
11.	"Heading Out To Sea"	1:00
12.	"Tug On The Line"	2:42
13.	"Man Against Beast"	5:36
14.	"Quint's Tale"	2:45
15.	"Brody Panics"	1:17
16.	"Barrel Off Starboard"	1:39
17.	"Great Chase"	3:01
18.	"Shark Tows Orca"	0:40
19.	"Three Barrels Under"	2:19
20.	"From Bad To Worse"	1:06
21.	"Quint Thinks It Over"	1:14
22.	"Work Montage (The Shark Cage Fugue)"	2:03
23.	"The Shark Approaches"	0:54
24.	"The Shark Hits The Cage"	2:04
25.	"Quint Meets His End"	1:27
26.	"Blown To Bits"	3:17
27.	"Jaws – End Title"	1:56

==== Disc 2 ====
Remastered Original Soundtrack
No.	Title	Length
1.	"Main Title (Theme From 'Jaws')"	2:21
2.	"Chrissie's Death"	1:43
3.	"Promenade (Tourists on the Menu)"	2:51
4.	"Out to Sea"	2:37
5.	"The Indianapolis Story"	2:31
6.	"Sea Attack Number One"	5:30
7.	"One Barrel Chase"	3:09
8.	"Preparing the Cage"	3:30
9.	"Night Search"	3:36
10.	"The Underwater Siege"	3:36
11.	"Hand to Hand Combat"	2:37
12.	"End Title (Theme From 'Jaws')"	2:23

==== Disc 3 ====
50th Anniversary Recording
No.	Title	Length

Album Recording
No.	Title	Length
1.	"Main Title and the Beach Attacks"	2.49
2.	"Theme from Jaws (variation)"	2:29
3.	"Chrissie's Death (Alternate)"	1:43
4.	"The Underwater Siege (Extended Version)"	2:50
5.	"Hand To Hand Combat (Extended Version)"	3:02

Music From Amity Town Beach
No.	Title	Length
6.	"Joplin Rag (Original Rags)" (composed by Scott Joplin)	2:07
7.	"Winter Stories Waltz" (composed by Alphons Czibulka)	1:46
8.	"Thousand And One Nights Waltz" (composed by Johann Strauss Jr.)	1:49
9.	"In The Good Old Summertime" (composed by George Evans & Ren Shields)	1:29

Film Score Recording
No.	Title	Length
10.	"Jaws – Main Title (Alternate)"	1:02
11.	"The Typewriter"	0:21
12.	"The Pier Incident (Alternate)"	2:25
13.	"Father and Son (Alternate)"	1:59
14.	"Into the Esturary (Alternate)"	2:51
15.	"Man Against Beast (Alternate)"	5:38
16.	"Brody Panics (Alternate)"	1:16
17.	"Barrel Off Starboard (Alternate Segment)"	1:26
18.	"Great Chase (Alternate)"	3:01
19.	"Shark Tows Orca (Alternate)"	0:40
20.	"Three Barrels Under (Alternate)"	2:15
21.	"The Shark Approaches (Alternate)"	0:56
22.	"The Shark Hits the Cage (Alternate)"	2:04
23.	"Quint Meets His End (Alternate)"	1:33
24.	"Wild Shark Theme"	1:10

=== 2025 Back Lot Music digital release ===
No.	Title	Length
1.	"Jaws – Main Title (2025 Mix)"	0:57
2.	"The First Victim (2025 Mix)"	1:46
3.	"Remains On The Beach (2025 Mix)"	0:58
4.	"The Empty Raft (2025 Mix)"	1:44
5.	"The Pier Incident (2025 Mix)"	2:29
6.	"Father And Son (2025 Mix)"	1:58
7.	"The Alimentary Canal (2025 Mix)"	1:56
8.	"Ben Gardner's Boat (2025 Mix)"	3:33
9.	"Tourist Montage (2025 Mix)"	1:33
10.	"Into The Estuary (2025 Mix)"	2:53
11.	"Heading Out To Sea (2025 Mix)"	0:59
12.	"Tug On The Line (2025 Mix)"	2:41
13.	"Man Against Beast (2025 Mix)"	5:35
14.	"Quint's Tale (2025 Mix)"	2:45
15.	"Brody Panics (2025 Mix)"	1:16
16.	"Barrel Off Starboard (2025 Mix)"	1:39
17.	"Great Chase (2025 Mix)"	3:01
18.	"Shark Tows Orca (2025 Mix)"	0:39
19.	"Three Barrels Under (2025 Mix)"	2:19
20.	"From Bad To Worse (2025 Mix)"	1:05
21.	"Quint Thinks It Over (2025 Mix)"	1:14
22.	"Work Montage (The Shark Cage Fugue) (2025 Mix)"	2:02
23.	"The Shark Approaches (2025 Mix)"	0:53
24.	"The Shark Hits The Cage (2025 Mix)"	2:03
25.	"Quint Meets His End (2025 Mix)"	1:27
26.	"Blown To Bits (2025 Mix)"	3:16
27.	"Jaws – End Title (2025 Mix)"	1:56

== Bibliography ==
- Audissino, Emilio (2020). "'The shark is not working' - but the music is: Scoring a hit with Jaws". In Hunter, I.Q.; Melia, Matthew (eds.). The Jaws Book. New York, NY: Bloomsbury Academic. ISBN 978-1-5013-7386-2.
- Audissino, Emilio (2021). The Film Music of John Williams. Wisconsin: University of Wisconsin Press. ISBN 978-0-299-33234-1.
- Biancorosso, Giorgio (March 2010). "The Shark in the Music". Music Analysis. 29 (1–3): 306–333. doi:10.1111/j.1468-2249.2011.00331.x. ISSN 0262-5245.
- Cancellaro, Joseph (2006). Exploring Sound Design for Interactive Media. Florence, Kentucky: Delmar Learning. ISBN 978-1-4018-8102-3.
- Conlan, Mark Gabrish (2026). "JOHN WILLIAMS: Jaws". Fanfare. 49 (4). Tenafly: 342–344.
- Downey, Paul (2022). The Shark is Roaring – The Story of Jaws: The Revenge. BearManor Media. ISBN 978-1629339726.
- Friedman, Lester D. (2006). Citizen Spielberg. Champaign: University of Illinois Press. ISBN 978-0-252-07358-8.
- Greiving, Tim (2025). John Williams: A Composer's Life. Oxford University Press. ISBN 9780197620908.
- Gottlieb, Carl (2005). The Jaws Log (Expanded ed.). New York: Newmarket Press for It Books. ISBN 978-0-06-222928-1.
- Howell, Amanda (2015). Popular Film Music and Masculinity in Action: A Different Tune. New York, NY: Routledge. ISBN 978-113410934-0.
- Hunter, I.Q. (2019). "Jaws: the revenge and the production of failure". Continuum: Journal of Media & Cultural Studies. 33 (6): 677–691. doi:10.1080/10304312.2019.1677981. hdl:2086/16764. S2CID 210613770.
- Lerberg, Matthew (2016). "Jabbering Jaws: Reimagining Representations of Sharks Post-Jaws". In George, Amber E.; Schatz, J.L. (eds.). Screening the Nonhuman: Representations of Animal Others in the Media. Lexington: Lexington. ISBN 978-1-4985-1375-3.
- Loock, Kathleen (2020). "'Just when you thought it was safe...' The Jaws sequels". In Hunter, I.Q.; Melia, Matthew (eds.). The Jaws Book. New York, NY: Bloomsbury Academic. ISBN 978-1-5013-7386-2.
- Kermode, Mark; Nelson, Jenny (2025). Mark Kermode's Surround Sound: The Story of Movie Music. Picador. ISBN 978-1447230564.
- Lintgen, Arthur (2016). "WILLIAMS: Jaws/WILLIAMS: Jaws 2". Fanfare. 39 (5). Tenafly: 461–462.
- Matessino, Michael (September 24, 1999). "Letter in response to "A Study of Jaws' Incisive Overture To Close Off the Century"". Film Score Monthly. Archived from the original on October 17, 2006.
- Matessino, Mike (2025). The Jaws Music Log (Booklet). Intrada Records. Intrada INT 7186.
- Moorman, Peter (2012). "Composing with Types and Flexible Modules: John Williams' Two-Note Ostinato for Jaws and its Use in Film-Music History". Journal of Film Music. 5 (1): 165–168.
- Petersen, Clarence (1975). The Bantam Story: Thirty Years of Paperback Publishing. Bantam Books. OCLC 1937339.
- Nosal, Andrew P.; Keenan, Elizabeth A.; Hastings, Philip A.; Gneezy, Ayelet (2016). "The Effect of Background Music in Shark Documentaries on Viewers' Perceptions of Sharks". PLoS One. 11 (8). San Franscisco.
- Scheurer, Timothy E. (Spring 1997). "John Williams and film music since 1971". Popular Music and Society. 21 (1). Taylor & Francis Online: 59–72. doi:10.1080/03007769708591655. Archived from the original on April 29, 2005.
- Summers, Tim (2013). ""Shirley, Bernstein Can't Be Serious?": Airplane! and Compositional Personas". Journal of Film Music. 6 (1): 75–86.
- Tylski, Alexandre (September 14, 1999). "A Study of Jaws' Incisive Overture To Close Off the Century". Film Score Monthly. Archived from the original on October 23, 2006.
