= Grammy Award for Best Engineered Recording – Special or Novel Effects =

Music award category

- Awarded for: quality engineered recording containing special or novelty effects
- Country: United States
- Presented by: National Academy of Recording Arts and Sciences
- First award: 1959
- Final award: 1965
- Website: grammy.com

The Grammy Award for Best Engineered Recording – Special or Novel Effects was awarded from 1960 to 1965. The award had several minor name changes:

- From 1960 to 1961 the award was known as Best Engineering Contribution – Novelty Recording
- From 1962 to 1963 it was awarded as Best Engineered Recording – Novelty
- From 1964 to 1965 it was awarded as Best Engineered Recording – Special or Novel Effects

This award was presented alongside the awards for Best Engineered Album, Non-Classical and Best Engineered Album, Classical.

Years reflect the year in which the Grammy Awards were presented, for works released in the previous year.

== Recipients ==
Year	Winner	Work	Artist(s)	Nominations	Ref.
1959	Ted Keep (engineer)	Alvin's Harmonica	David Seville	Markko Polo Adventurers – Orienta; Billy Mure – Supersonics in Flight; Alvino Rey – The Bat; Ralph Hunter Choir – The Wild Wild West	
1961	John Kraus (engineer)	The Old Payola Roll Blues	Stan Freberg	David Seville & the Chipmunks – Alvin for President; Jack Cookerly – June Night; David Seville & the Chipmunks – Let's All Sing the Chipmunks; Larry Verne – Mr. Custer	
1962	John Kraus (engineer)	Stan Freberg Presents the United States of America	Stan Freberg	Bruno Vineis – Cartoons in Stereo; Ted Keep – The Alvin Show; Eddie Brackett – The Soupy Sales Show; Rafael O. Valentin – X-15 and Other Sounds: Rockets Missiles and Jets	
1963	Robert Fine (engineer)	The Civil War, Vol. I	Martin Gabel & Frederick Fennell	Vaughn Meader – The First Family; Allan Sherman – My Son, the Folk Singer; Lou Monte – Pepino, the Italian Mouse; David Seville – The Chipmunk Songbook	
1964	Robert Fine (engineer)	The Civil War, Vol. II	Frederick Fennell	Hank Thompson – Cheyenne Frontier Days; Bill McFadden, Bryna Rayburn – Fast, Fast, Fast, Relief from TV Commercials; Shut Downs – Four in the Floor; Dean Elliott – Heartstrings	
1965	Dave Hassinger (engineer)	The Chipmunks Sing the Beatles	Alvin and the Chipmunks	"The Addams Family Theme" (Vic Mizzy) — James Malloy, engineer; The Big Sounds of the Sports Cars — Bill Robinson, engineer; Les Poupées de Paris (Various Artists) — John Norman, engineer; "Walking in the Rain" (The Ronettes) — Larry Levine, engineer	
