= Let's All Sing with The Chipmunks =

Let's All Sing with the Chipmunks

Studio album by Ross Bagdasarian and Alvin and the Chipmunks
- Released: 1959
- Recorded: 1958–59
- Genre: Children's
- Length: 23:32
- Label: Liberty
- Producer: Ross Bagdasarian

Ross Bagdasarian and Alvin and the Chipmunks chronology
Let's All Sing with the Chipmunks (1959)	Sing Again with The Chipmunks (1960)

Alternative cover
- 1961 reissue, using the animated makeovers for The Alvin Show

Singles from Let's All Sing with the Chipmunks
- 1. "The Chipmunk Song (Christmas Don't Be Late)" Released: 1958; 2. "Alvin's Harmonica" Released: 1959; 3. "Ragtime Cowboy Joe" Released: 1959

Professional ratings
Review scores
Source	Rating
Allmusic	4/5 stars

Let's All Sing with the Chipmunks is the debut album of Alvin and the Chipmunks. It is a children's novelty album. The songs on the record are a mixture between cover versions of children's songs in the public domain and customized original musical material. It contains the A-sides of the Chipmunks' first three singles: "The Chipmunk Song (Christmas Don't Be Late)", "Alvin's Harmonica" and "Ragtime Cowboy Joe". The artist credit on the original release was listed as Ross Bagdasarian (changed to "Alvin, Simon and Theodore with David Seville" on the revised 1961 cover).

== Album cover variations ==
The original issue of the album depicted three realistic looking chipmunks on the cover, with Alvin posing like Al Jolson. When the album was reissued two years later, a new cover was substituted, that of an Alvin Show animation cel setup reenacting the poses the original chipmunks made, with the exception of Alvin, who was posing like Elvis Presley. The 2008 compact disc reissue uses the 1961 front cover design along with the original 1959 back cover.

== Chart performance ==
The album debuted on Billboard magazine's Top LP's chart in the issue dated November 29, 1959, peaking at No. 4 during a forty-one-week run on the chart.

== Track listing ==
All songs would later be adapted as animated musical segments for The Alvin Show.

=== Side one ===
1. "Yankee Doodle" (Trad., arr. Ross Bagdasarian Sr.) – 1:57
2. "Chipmunk Fun" (Bagdasarian Sr.) – 1:58
3. "The Little Dog (Oh Where, Oh Where Has My Little Dog Gone)" (Septimus Winner)– 1:59
4. "Old MacDonald Cha Cha Cha" (Trad., arr. Bagdasarian Sr.) – 1:55
5. "Three Blind (Folded) Mice" (Trad., arr. Bagdasarian Sr.) – 1:54
6. "Alvin's Harmonica" (Bagdasarian Sr.) – 2:42

=== Side two ===
7. "Good Morning Song" (Mildred Hill) – 1:09
8. "Whistle While You Work" (Frank Churchill, Larry Morey) – 1:49
9. "If You Love Me (Alouette)" (Trad., arr. Bagdasarian Sr.) – 2:12
10. "Ragtime Cowboy Joe" (Maurice Abrahams) – 2:08
11. "Pop Goes the Weasel" (Trad., arr. Bagdasarian Sr.) – 1:19
12. "The Chipmunk Song (Christmas Don't Be Late)" (Bagdasarian, Sr.) – 2:21

== Production credits ==
- Ross Bagdasarian - Producer
- Ted Keep - Engineer
- Pate/Francis & Assoc. - cover design and actual artwork [original pressing]
- Studio Five - animation artwork [reissue pressing]

== Charts ==
Chart (1959–1960)	Peak position
US Best Selling Monophonic LP's (Billboard)	4
