= Sing Again with The Chipmunks =

Sing Again with the Chipmunks

Studio album by Ross Bagdasarian and Alvin and the Chipmunks
- Released: 1960
- Recorded: June–October 1959
- Genre: Children's
- Length: 24:41
- Label: Liberty
- Producer: Ross Bagdasarian

Ross Bagdasarian and Alvin and the Chipmunks chronology
Let's All Sing with The Chipmunks (1959)	Sing Again with the Chipmunks (1960)	Around the World with The Chipmunks (1960)

Alternative cover
- 1961 reissue, utilizing the animated makeovers for The Alvin Show

Singles from Sing Again with the Chipmunks
- 1. "Witch Doctor" Released: 1958; 2. "Alvin's Orchestra" Released: 1960; 3. "Comin' 'Round the Mountain" Released: 1960

Professional ratings
Review scores
Source	Rating
Allmusic	2/5 stars

Sing Again with The Chipmunks is Alvin and the Chipmunks' second album, released by Liberty Records in January 1960. The album follows the same format as their first album, and contains the group's fifth and sixth singles—"Alvin's Orchestra" and "Comin' 'Round the Mountain". Since its initial release, Sing Again with The Chipmunks has appeared twice on CD; both releases utilized the revised 1961 cover artwork, minus the song lyrics printed on the original back cover.

== Commercial performance ==
Sing Again with The Chipmunks peaked at No. 31 on the Billboard pop albums chart.

== Artwork ==
As with the debut album, the original issue depicted three realistic looking chipmunks on the cover sharing space with a photo of Ross Bagdasarian Sr. When the album was reissued one year later, a new cover was substituted, that of an Alvin Show animation cel setup reenacting the poses the original chipmunks and Seville made.

== Notes ==
This album has Alvin's first songwriting credit.

== Track listing ==
=== Side one ===
1. "Sing Again with the Chipmunks" (Ross Bagdasarian, Sr.) – 0:53
2. "Comin' 'Round the Mountain" (Traditional, arr. Ross Bagdasarian, Sr.) – 2:14
3. "Home on the Range" (Brewster Higley and Daniel Kelley) – 2:53
4. "I Wish I Had a Horse" (Ross Bagdasarian Sr., Mark McIntyre) – 2:04
5. "Swanee River" (Stephen Foster) – 1:49
6. "When Johnny Comes Marching Home" (Patrick Sarsfield Gilmore) – 1:35

=== Side two ===
7. "Sing a Goofy Song" (Ross Bagdasarian Sr.) – 2:32
8. "Swing Low, Sweet Chariot" (Harry Thacker Burleigh) – 2:02
9. "Witch Doctor" (Ross Bagdasarian Sr.) — ("group" version) – 2:04
10. "Working on the Railroad" (Bill Balsham, var. Benny Goodman) – 1:56
11. "Row, Row, Row Your Boat" (Traditional, arr. by E. O. Lyte, Ross Bagdasarian Sr.) – 1:38
12. "Alvin’s Orchestra" (Ross Bagdasarian Sr.) – 3:01

All songs except "Sing Again with the Chipmunks" were adapted as a musical segment for The Alvin Show in 1961.

Source: Answers.com CD Universe

== Personnel ==
- David Seville – keyboards, conduction and commentary
- Alvin Seville – lead vocals, guitars, and harmonica
- Simon Seville – guitars, bass and background vocals
- Theodore Seville – drums and background vocals

=== Production ===
- Ross Bagdasarian – Producer
- Ted Keep – Engineer
- Pate/Francis & Assoc. – cover design and actual artwork – [original pressing]
- Studio Five – animation artwork – [reissue pressing]
