= Shorty Long (disambiguation) =

Shorty Long (1940-1969) was an American soul singer, songwriter, musician, and record producer for Motown's Soul Records imprint. It may also refer to:

- Shorty Long (1923–1991), American country/rockabilly musician who played on recordings for RCA Corporation records including piano on some of Elvis's early 1956 recordings on RCA, including Elvis (1956 album).
- Shorty Long-back, alternative name for the mullet haircut
