= Ragtime Cowboy Joe =

Popular song published in 1912

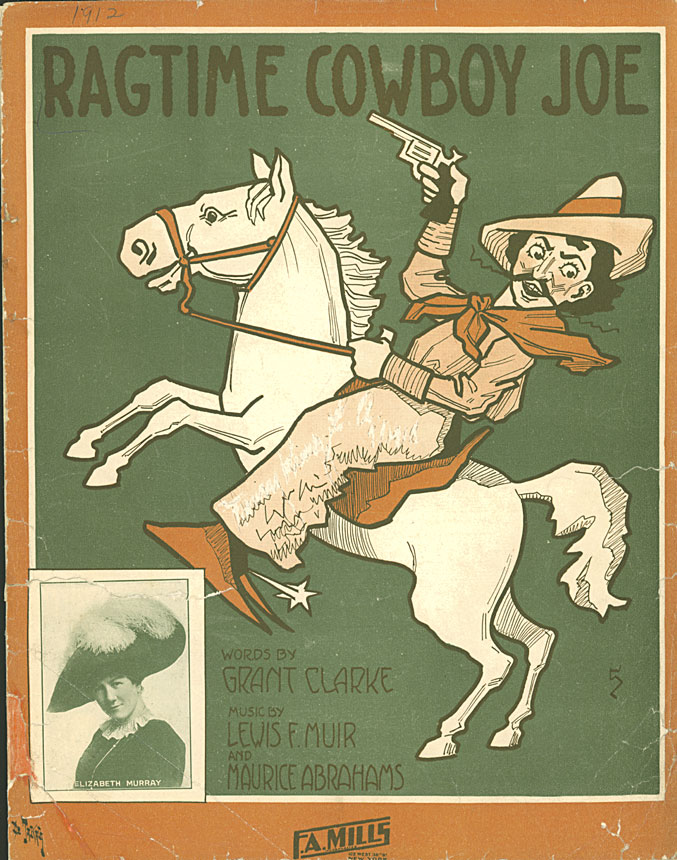
- 1912 sheet music

Song
- Published: 1912 by F.A. Mills Publishing
- Genre: Western swing, pop
- Composers: Lewis F. Muir, Maurice Abrahams
- Lyricist: Grant Clarke

"Ragtime Cowboy Joe" is a popular western swing song. The lyrics were written by Grant Clarke and the music was composed by Lewis F. Muir and Maurice Abrahams. It was copyrighted and published in 1912 by F.A. Mills.

== Artists ==
The song has been recorded by a diverse group of artists, including Bob Roberts (1912), the Tune Wranglers (1936), Pinky Tomlin (1939), Eddy Howard (1947), Jo Stafford (1949), and the Chipmunks (1959). It was also performed by Betty Hutton in the 1945 musical film Incendiary Blonde.

In 1978, Jimmy Stewart made a memorable surprise cameo appearance performing the song on the piano on the final episode of The Carol Burnett Show.

== Origin ==
The song's lyricist and composers are Clarke, Muir and Abrahams. Clarke also wrote "Second Hand Rose". "Ragtime Cowboy Joe" was composed in Brooklyn after an appearance at the home of Abrahams by his nephew, Joe Abrahams, wearing a cowboy outfit. Maurice Abrahams was so captivated by the appearance of his nephew dressed up as a cowboy that he was inspired to write "Ragtime Cowboy Joe". It became a number-one hit song for singer Bob Roberts, also the second best-selling record of 1912.

== Original lyrics ==
As with many popular songs of the era, the verse is often omitted: the refrain's lyrics vary somewhat depending on the performer.

(verse)

Out in Arizona
Where the bad men are,
And the only friend to guide you
Is an evening star,
The roughest and the toughest
Man by far
Is Ragtime Cowboy Joe.
He got his name from singing
To the cows and sheep
Every night they say
He sings the herd to sleep
In a basso
Rich and deep,
Crooning soft and low.

(refrain)

He always sings
Raggy music to the cattle
As he swings
Back and forward in the saddle
On a horse
That is syncopated gaited
And there's such a funny meter
To the roar of his repeater.
How they run
When they hear that fellow's gun
Because the Western folks all know
He's a high-faluting, scooting, shooting,
Son of a gun from Arizona,
Ragtime Cowboy Joe.

(verse)

Dressed up every Sunday
In his Sunday clothes
He beats it to the village
Where he always goes
And every girl
In town is Joe's
'Cause he's a ragtime bear.
When he starts a-spieling
On the dance hall floor
No one but a lunatic
Would start a war
Wise men know
His forty-four
Makes men dance for fair.

Variations include: "Where the bad lands are", "How he sings", "Ragtime music", "That's syncopated gaited/And you ought to hear the meter", "scootin' shootin'" or "rootin' tootin'", "Son of a gun from old Wyoming", or additions of "(A pretty good horse)", "He's some cowboy", and/or "Talk about your cowboy".

== On radio ==
"Ragtime Cowboy Joe" was the radio show theme song for New York City's long running, award-winning public radio show, Cowboy Joe's Radio Ranch (1976–1988), hosted by Paul Aaron, New York's Cowboy Joe. During one of his radio shows Paul Aaron had the elder Joe Abrahams (the original Cowboy Joe) as a special guest. Paul Aaron played many versions of his favorite song dating back to one sung by Bob Roberts from an RCA Victor 78 rpm record. He also played many "live" versions recorded during the University of Wyoming football and basketball games. A more recent rendition of the song appears on Dan Hicks and the Hot Licks' 2009 album "Tangled Tales".

== College fight songs ==
=== University of Wyoming song ===
"Ragtime Cowboy Joe" is also the fight song of the University of Wyoming. Traditionally, Cowboy fans stand and clap to the beat of the song as played by Wyoming's Western Thunder Marching Band. The version of the song appropriated by Wyoming was written by Francis Edwin Stroup (1909–2010) in 1961. He rewrote the chorus. Stroup had been an assistant professor of Health and Physical Education for Men at Wyoming until August 31, 1950. He also had composed the fight song for his alma mater, the University of North Texas in 1939, ten years after graduating. The song, "Fight, North Texas", has endured for eighty-six years and the lyrics have changed minimally to reflect the name changes of the university. Stroup also composed school songs for Drake University and the University of Chicago. Stroup, while teaching at Northern Illinois University in 1961, also wrote the "Huskie Fight Song", which was adopted as the university's fight song in 1963.

The lyrics Stroup wrote for the University of Wyoming follow:

(for the Cowboys)

C! O! W! B! O! Y! S!
COWBOYS! COWBOYS! COWBOYS!

(for the Cowgirls)

C! O! W! G! I! R! L! S!
COWGIRLS! COWGIRLS! COWGIRLS!

=== University of California, Davis ===
The UC Davis Marching Band at University of California, Davis also adapted the song with the following variation:

He's a high-falutin', rootin' tootin'
Son of a gun from California
He's some cowboy
Talk about your cowboy
Ragtime Cowboy Joe

== The Chipmunks ==
"Ragtime Cowboy Joe"

Single by David Seville and the Chipmunks

from the album Let's All Sing with the Chipmunks
- B-side: "Flip Side"
- Released: 1959
- Genre: Pop
- Length: 2:06
- Label: Liberty
- Composers: Lewis F. Muir, Maurice Abrahams
- Lyricist: Grant Clarke
- Producer: Ross Bagdasarian Sr.

The Chipmunks singles chronology
"Alvin's Harmonica" (1959)	"Ragtime Cowboy Joe" (1959)	"Alvin's Orchestra" (1960)

"Ragtime Cowboy Joe" is the third and final single from the Chipmunks' debut album Let's All Sing with the Chipmunks. The song was released as a single in 1959. The Chipmunks' two prior singles, "The Chipmunk Song" and "Alvin's Harmonica", both reached the Top Ten; "Ragtime Cowboy Joe" peaked at No. 16 on the Billboard Hot 100 the week of August 2, 1959. The song was also a success on the Billboard Black Singles, peaking at No. 29. In Canada it reached No. 4

Since the song was also credited to David Seville by Billboard, it became Seville's fourth consecutive Top 20 single. The single also reached No. 11 in the UK singles chart, the first and only Chipmunks song to chart in the UK until 1992's "Achy Breaky Heart". The B- or flip-side, also written by Bagdasarian, is titled "Flip Side".

== Disputed Origin ==
During the late 1930s a swing version of the song was making the rounds in the Chicago/Southbend area. It was authored by Ralph R. Chandler who was a band leader in the area. One day over breakfast with bandmates, Mr. Chandler was surprised that his version of the song came over the radio. Mr. Chandler maintained to his death that he authored the arrangement of the song's more popular version. His family descendants continue with his original assertions.
