= When My Blue Moon Turns to Gold Again =

Single by Wiley Walker and Gene Sullivan
- B-side: "Live And Let Live"
- Released: 1941
- Recorded: 1940
- Genre: Folk, Country
- Length: 2:36
- Label: Okeh
- Songwriters: Wiley Walker, Gene Sullivan

"When My Blue Moon Turns to Gold Again" is a song written by Wiley Walker and Gene Sullivan in 1940. They first recorded it in 1941.

== Background ==
According to Gene Sullivan, the song, “When my Blue Moon Turns To Gold Again,” was written out of necessity. Sullivan commented, “The 1940 recording session that Wiley Walker and I did for Columbia Records was a mistake. We didn’t know anything about original songs. We just recorded songs that we liked to sing. The Columbia A & R man, Art Satherley, trashed most of the tunes we recorded and we had to learn six new songs in one day. He finally sat us down and told us that we were going to have to come up with original songs if we wanted to stay in the recording business. That was all new to us because we had never done that. So I started to try to write songs.” “During that time, I was moving my family and everything we owned in our car from Lubbock Texas to Oklahoma City for a new job. I drove all night across Texas looking right into a bright full moon. The moon was so bright that I could even turn off the car headlights and still see the road. And that’s where I got the idea for ‘When My Blue Moon Turns To Gold Again.’ And I wrote that song on that trip.”

One historian noted that "their disc is said to have sold millions".

== Cover versions ==
The song has been recorded by among others:

- In 1944, Cindy Walker had a No. 5 on the Best Selling Retail Folk Records chart with the song.
- In 1948, Cliffie Stone hit No. 11 on the Best Selling Retail Folk Records chart with the song.
- In 1956, Elvis Presley included it on his album Elvis.
- Sammi Smith
- The Statler Brothers
- Hank Thompson
- Emmylou Harris
- Jerry Lee Lewis

== In popular culture ==
- On January 6, 1957, Presley sang it in front of an audience estimated at 50 million viewers, as part of his third and last appearance on The Ed Sullivan Show.. Elvis also sang in on The '68 Comeback Special recorded in Las Vegas in 1968.
