= Around the World with The Chipmunks =

Studio album by David Seville and Alvin and the Chipmunks
- Released: January 1, 1960
- Length: 25:58
- Label: Liberty Records
- Producer: Ross Bagdasarian

David Seville and Alvin and the Chipmunks chronology
Sing Again with The Chipmunks (1960)	Around the World with The Chipmunks (1960)	The Alvin Show (1961)

Alternative cover
- 1961 reissue, utilizing the animated makeovers for The Alvin Show

Singles from Around the World with The Chipmunks
- 1. "Rudolph the Red-Nosed Reindeer" Released: 1960

Professional ratings
Review scores
Source	Rating
Allmusic	4/5 stars

Around the World with The Chipmunks is the third album by Alvin and the Chipmunks with David Seville. Released on January 1, 1960, by Liberty Records. it was the last album to be originally issued with realistic-looking chipmunks on the cover, then reissued the following year with a new cover utilizing the character redesign for The Alvin Show.

== Track listing ==
All tracks are written by Ross Bagdasarian, except where noted.

Side One
No.	Title	Country/Locale	Length
1.	"The Brave Chipmunks"	Mexico	1:48
2.	"Japanese Banana"	Japan	2:28
3.	"I Wish I Could Speak French"	France	2:46
4.	"Stuck in Arabia"	Arabia	2:05
5.	"August Dear" (Marx Augustin, arr. by Ross Bagdasarian)	Germany	1:27
6.	"Rudolph the Red-Nosed Reindeer" (John D. Marks)	North Pole	2:32

Side Two
No.	Title	Country/Locale	Length
1.	"The Pidgin English Hula" (Chas. E King)	Hawaii	1:53
2.	"Oh Gondaliero" (Eduardo di Capua, Alfredo Mazzucchi, arr. by Ross Bagdasarian Sr.)	Italy	3:23
3.	"Comin' 'Thru the Rye" (Robert Burns, arr. by Ross Bagdasarian Sr.)	Scotland	1:35
4.	"Spain"	Spain	1:37
5.	"The Magic Mountain"	Switzerland	2:21
6.	"Lily of Laguna" (Leslie Stuart, arr. by Ross Bagdasarian Sr.)	England	2:06
