= Elvis (1956 album) =

Studio album by Elvis Presley
- Released: October 19, 1956
- Recorded: January 30; September 1–3, 1956
- Studios: Radio Recorders Studio 1 (Hollywood); RCA Victor Studio 1 (New York)
- Genres: Rock and roll; rockabilly; country
- Length: 29:47
- Label: RCA Victor
- Producer: Steve Sholes

Elvis Presley chronology
Elvis Presley (1956)	Elvis (1956)	Love Me Tender (1956)

Professional ratings
Review scores
Source	Rating
AllMusic	5/5 stars
Billboard	positive ("Spotlight" pick)
Encyclopedia of Popular Music	5/5 stars
MusicHound	4.5/5 stars
The Rolling Stone Album Guide	5/5 stars
Rough Guides	4/5 stars

Elvis (also known as Elvis Presley No. 2) is the second studio album by American rock and roll singer Elvis Presley, released by RCA Victor on October 19, 1956 in mono. Recording sessions took place on September 1, September 2, and September 3 at Radio Recorders in Hollywood, with one track left over from the sessions for Presley's debut album at the RCA Victor recording studios on January 30 in New York. It spent four weeks at #1 on the Billboard Top Pop Albums chart that year, making Presley the first recording artist to have both albums go straight to number one in the same year. It would go on to spend 5 weeks at #1 in total. It was certified Gold on February 17, 1960, and Platinum on August 10, 2011, by the Recording Industry Association of America.

It was originally released in UK in 1957 as Elvis Presley No. 2 with a different front cover (on His Master's Voice CLP1105). It was also cataloged as Rock 'n' Roll No. 2. The original U.S. release inaugurated the practice (applied inconsistently for the first few years, but commonly afterwards) of crediting Presley only by his first name on album sleeves, though his full name continued to be used on labels.

== Content ==
RCA Victor producer Steve Sholes had commissioned two new songs for this batch of sessions, "Paralyzed" from Otis Blackwell and "Love Me" from Jerry Leiber and Mike Stoller, the authors of Presley's summer hit of 1956, "Hound Dog," the first record to top all three of the Billboard singles charts then in existence: Pop, R&B, and C&W. Presley decided upon three Little Richard covers, and selected three new country ballads respectively from regular Everly Brothers writer Boudleaux Bryant and guitarist Chet Atkins, Sun staff musician and engineer Stan Kesler, and Aaron Schroeder and Ben Weisman. The latter two, contracted to Hill and Range, the publishing company of Presley's manager, Colonel Tom Parker, would write dozens of songs for Presley through the 1960s. Also included was the song with which Presley won second prize at a fair in Tupelo when he was ten years old, Red Foley's 1941 country song, "Old Shep".

With all but one track on the album (with the exception of "So Glad You're Mine") recorded at a single set of sessions over three days in September, Presley and his touring band of Scotty Moore, Bill Black, and D.J. Fontana, along with The Jordanaires, managed to recreate the loose feel from Sun Studio days, mixing rhythm and blues and country and western repertoire items as they had on all of his Sun singles. They reinforced this effect by including material echoing his very first Sun record: a blues by Arthur Crudup, author of "That's All Right (Mama)"; and a song recorded by bluegrass founder Bill Monroe, "When My Blue Moon Turns to Gold Again". The sessions were attended by a few outsiders, namely his current girlfriend at the time, actress Natalie Wood and actor Nick Adams, both of whom had starred in Rebel Without a Cause, Presley's favorite James Dean film. Steve Sholes was the RCA man at the session, and handled the paper work and such, but Elvis himself chose the songs and led the session.

The piano player on this album is not registered in the official RCA Victor archives, except for the song "So Glad You're Mine", which was cut at a previous session in New York. In a 1984 interview conducted by Jan-Erik Kjeseth, Gordon Stoker of the Jordanaires stated that he was the piano player on most of the songs on the album. In an article written by Kjeseth for the Flaming Star magazine, it was argued that the piano player on "Love Me", "Old Shep" and "How's the World Treating You" was Elvis himself. Ernst Jørgensen, writer of Elvis Presley - A Study in Music, seems to be of the same opinion. Kjeseth also claims that Elvis played the piano on the single from this session, "Playing for Keeps". Again, Jørgensen seems to be of the same opinion. Gordon Stoker played the piano on "Rip it Up" and "Anyplace is Paradise".

== Reissues ==
RCA first reissued the original 12 track album on compact disc in 1984. This issue, in reprocessed (fake) stereo sound, was quickly withdrawn and the disc was reissued in original mono. RCA reissued an expanded edition of the album in 1999, and again in 2005. For the 1999 reissue, six bonus tracks were added that were both sides of three singles, altering the running order. Four of the tracks were chart-toppers: "Love Me Tender", "Too Much", and the double-sided classic "Hound Dog" and "Don't Be Cruel". Bonus tracks recorded on July 2 at RCA Studios in New York City, in September at Radio Recorders, and "Love Me Tender" at 20th Century Fox Stage One during the sessions for Love Me Tender. The 2005 reissue was remastered using DSD technology with the six bonus tracks appended in standard fashion, in the following order: "Playing for Keeps", "Too Much", "Don't Be Cruel", "Hound Dog", "Any Way You Want Me (That's How I Will Be)", and "Love Me Tender". This acclaimed latest remaster was the handiwork of audio restorer Kevan Budd, who also drew praise for his 2005 remasters of Presley's first and third albums (respectively, Elvis Presley and Loving You) as well as the 2004 upgrade known as Elvis at Sun. These rock-n'roll tapes may have been among those possibly dumped into the Delaware River near RCA Victor's Camden, New Jersey plant in the late 1950s.

In 2014, Elvis was reissued on the Follow That Dream label in a deluxe edition consisting of 2 discs packaged in a 7-inch sleeve. The first disc contains the original album plus every known outtake from the Labor-Day 1956 sessions. The second disc features a live concert held at Hirsch Coliseum, Youth Center, Louisiana State Fairgrounds on December 15, 1956.

== Track listing ==
=== Original release ===
Side one
No.	Title	Writer(s)	Recording date	Length
1.	"Rip It Up"	Robert Blackwell; John Marascalco	September 3, 1956	1:50
2.	"Love Me"	Jerry Leiber; Mike Stoller	September 1, 1956	2:41
3.	"When My Blue Moon Turns to Gold Again"	Gene Sullivan; Wiley Walker	September 2, 1956	2:18
4.	"Long Tall Sally"	Robert Blackwell; Enotris Johnson; Richard Penniman	September 2, 1956	1:51
5.	"First in Line"	Aaron Schroeder; Ben Weisman	September 3, 1956	3:21
6.	"Paralyzed"	Otis Blackwell; Elvis Presley	September 2, 1956	2:18

Side two
No.	Title	Writer(s)	Recording date	Length
1.	"So Glad You're Mine"	Arthur Crudup	January 30, 1956	2:18
2.	"Old Shep"	Red Foley	September 2, 1956	4:10
3.	"Ready Teddy"	Robert Blackwell; John Marascalco	September 3, 1956	1:55
4.	"Anyplace Is Paradise"	Joe Thomas	September 2, 1956	2:26
5.	"How's the World Treating You?"	Chet Atkins; Boudleaux Bryant	September 1, 1956	2:23
6.	"How Do You Think I Feel?"	Webb Pierce; Wayne Walker	September 1, 1956	2:10

=== 1999 edition ===
No.	Title	Writer(s)	Recording date	Length
1.	"Hound Dog" (released July 13, 1956, 47-6604b, #1)	Leiber; Stoller	July 2, 1956	2:16
2.	"Don't Be Cruel" (released July 13, 1956, 47-6604a, #1)	O. Blackwell; Presley	July 2, 1956	2:02
3.	"Anyway You Want Me (That's How I Will Be)" (released September 28, 1956, 47-6643b, #20)	Cliff Owens; Schroeder	July 2, 1956	2:13
4.	"Rip It Up"	R. Blackwell; Marascalco	September 3, 1956	1:50
5.	"Love Me" (#2)	Leiber; Stoller	September 1, 1956	2:41
6.	"When My Blue Moon Turns to Gold Again" (#19)	Sullivan; Walker	September 2, 1956	2:18
7.	"Long Tall Sally"	R. Blackwell; Johnson; Penniman	September 2, 1956	1:51
8.	"First in Line"	Schroeder; Weisman	September 3, 1956	3:21
9.	"Paralyzed" (#59)	O. Blackwell; Presley	September 2, 1956	2:18
10.	"So Glad You're Mine"	Crudup	January 30, 1956	2:18
11.	"Old Shep" (#47)	Foley	September 2, 1956	4:10
12.	"Ready Teddy"	R. Blackwell; Marascalco	September 3, 1956	1:55
13.	"Anyplace Is Paradise"	Thomas	September 2, 1956	2:26
14.	"How's the World Treating You?"	Atkins; Bryant	September 1, 1956	2:23
15.	"How Do You Think I Feel"	Pierce; Walker	September 1, 1956	2:10
16.	"Too Much" (released January 4, 1957, 47-6800a, #2)	Lee Rosenberg; Bernard Weinman	September 2, 1956	2:31
17.	"Playing for Keeps" (released January 4, 1957, 47-6800b, #21)	Stan Kesler	September 1, 1956	2:50
18.	"Love Me Tender" (released September 28, 1956, 47-6643a, #1)	Vera Matson; Presley	August 24, 1956	2:41

=== FTD release ===
Disc 1 - The Original Album
No.	Title	Length
1.	"Rip It Up"	1:56
2.	"Love Me"	2:46
3.	"When My Blue Moon Turns to Gold Again"	2:23
4.	"Long Tall Sally"	1:56
5.	"First in Line"	3:24
6.	"Paralyzed"	2:29
7.	"So Glad You’re Mine"	2:23
8.	"Old Shep"	4:13
9.	"Ready Teddy"	1:59
10.	"Anyplace Is Paradise"	2:28
11.	"How’s the World Treating You"	2:27
12.	"How Do You Think I Feel"	2:15
13.	"Playing for Keeps" (bonus track)	2:56
14.	"Too Much" (bonus track)	2:37
15.	"Don’t Be Cruel" (bonus track)	2:05
16.	"Hound Dog" (bonus track)	2:18
17.	"Any Way You Want Me (That’s How I Will Be)" (bonus track)	2:14
18.	"Rip It Up" (takes 10-14) (bonus track)	3:08
19.	"Rip It Up" (take 15) (bonus track)	2:05
20.	"Rip It Up" (take 16) (bonus track)	1:59
21.	"Rip It Up" (take 17) (bonus track)	2:06
22.	"Rip It Up" (take 18-19M) (bonus track)	3:53
23.	"Old Shep" (take 5) (bonus track)	4:01

Disc 2 - Recorded live at Hirsch Coliseum - Youth Center, Louisiana State Fairgrounds, Shreveport, December 15, 1956
No.	Title	Length
1.	"Heartbreak Hotel"	2:46
2.	"Long Tall Sally"	2:46
3.	"I Was the One"	2:46
4.	"Love Me Tender"	2:46
5.	"Don’t Be Cruel"	2:46
6.	"Love Me"	2:46
7.	"I Got A Woman"	2:46
8.	"When My Blue Moon Turns to Gold Again"	2:46
9.	"Paralyzed"	2:46

Notes

- Chart positions for LPM 1382 from Billboard Top Pop Albums chart; for singles from Billboard Pop Singles chart.

== Personnel ==
- Elvis Presley – vocals, acoustic rhythm guitar, piano on "Old Shep", “Paralyzed", “First in Line”, "How's The World Treating You", and 1997 bonus track "Playing For Keeps“
- Scotty Moore – electric lead guitar
- Shorty Long – piano on “So Glad You’re Mine”
- Gordon Stoker – piano
- Bill Black – double bass
- D. J. Fontana – drums
- The Jordanaires (Gordon Stoker, Hoyt Hawkins, Neal Matthews, Hugh Jarrett) – backing vocals

== Charts ==
=== Weekly charts ===
Chart (1956)	Peak position
UK Albums (Official Charts)	3
US Billboard 200	1

== Certifications ==
Region	Certification	Certified units/sales
United Kingdom (BPI)	Silver	60,000^{‡}
United States (RIAA)	Platinum	1,000,000^{^}
^{^} Shipments figures based on certification alone.^{‡} Sales+streaming figures based on certification alone.
