= First in Line (song) =

Song by Elvis Presley

from the album Elvis (1956)
- Released: 1956
- Recorded: 1956
- Length: 3:21
- Label: RCA Victor
- Songwriter(s): Aaron Schroeder; Ben Weisman

"First in Line" is a song by Elvis Presley from his second album Elvis (1956, Presley's first album on RCA). The song was written by Aaron Schroeder and Ben Weisman, the first song Weisman ever wrote for Presley.

== Recording ==
Presley recorded the song at the Radio Recorders Studio in Hollywood, California on September 3, 1956.

== Release ==
The song was first released on Presley's 1956 album Elvis in 1956.

== Musical style and lyrics ==
It is a sad, plaintive ballad.

The New Rolling Stone Album Guide describes it as a "poignant love song", "one of Elvis' most deeply felt balladeering performances (despite doing 27 takes of the song before he was satisfied)." The book also notes the vulnerability of Presley's voice in it.

== Track listing ==
7-inch EP Strictly Elvis (Elvis, Vol 3.) (RCA Victor EP-994)

Side 1

1. "Long Tall Sally"
2. "First in Line"

Side 2

1. "How Do You Think I Feel"
2. "How's the World Treating You"
