= Theodore Keep =

- Born: Theodore Gene Keep; 20 January 1924; San Francisco, California, U.S.
- Died: 21 May 2007 (aged 83) Bullhead City, Arizona, U.S.
- Occupations: Audio engineer, record producer
- Years active: 1950s–1980s
- Labels: Liberty Records, CBS Records

Theodore Gene Keep (20 January 1924 – 21 May 2007) was an American audio engineer and record producer. As a co-founder of Liberty Records, he was the namesake of the character of Theodore from The Alvin Show and The Chipmunks.

== Biography ==
=== Early life and education ===
Theodore Gene Keep was born 20 January 1924 in San Francisco, California to Ethel Willard and Malcolm Charles Keep. By 1940, the family lived in the Sawtelle neighborhood of Los Angeles.

=== Career ===
He was a co-founder of Liberty Records. In his role as chief of engineering at the label and afterward, Keep introduced a number of innovations to commercial sound recording.

During the 1950s, Keep provided the synchronization process that allowed Ross Bagdasarian, Sr. to combine his speed-doubled voice technique with full orchestration on "Witch Doctor" and the series of Chipmunks recordings. For the latter, Keep received Grammy Awards in 1959 and 1960. Keep's Liberty Studios was the first commercial recording studio to employ solid state mixing equipment, retaining its claim as "the world's only transistorized recording studio" into 1960.

Keep also brought innovations to electronic music. Working with the Richard Marino Orchestra, Keep combined custom-built synthesizers and audio signal processing circuits to achieve the unique sounds on the 1961 exotica album Out of This World. This release built upon Keep's stereo mix experimentation that lent a surreal quality to the early Martin Denny recordings. He is also credited with supplying electronic effects on the spooky LP Fantastica: Music From Outer Space, by Russ Garcia and His Orchestra.

In 1962, Keep loaned to a friend, trumpeter Herb Alpert, a tape he had made of bullfight crowds in Tijuana, Mexico. Alpert used the sound effects as the basis for The Lonely Bull, the first hit recording for Alpert's Tijuana Brass.

Keep is also known for lending his name to the character of Theodore from The Alvin Show and The Chipmunks, and for choosing The Ventures to record the Hawaii Five-O theme.

Into the 1960s through 1980s, Keep chose to focus on television and film audio as a head mixer at CBS Studios. Among the better-known soundtracks he recorded were the John Williams compositions for The Towering Inferno and Jaws.

In addition to the music industry, Keep formed businesses in San Bernardino County, California including an answering service and the Hi-Desert Star newspaper.

=== Personal life ===
Keep was married three times: Dorothy Patapoff (1953), Jolene Maddin (1957), and Kathleen Stuart (1963 – 1979). He had three children with Stewart: Ted Keep, Jr., Darry L. Keep, and Genie Keep.

Keep died 21 May 2007, in Bullhead City, Arizona.

== Awards and honors ==
The Grammy Awards are awarded annually by the National Academy of Recording Arts and Sciences of the United States. Keep has won 2 Grammys from 5 nominations.

Year	Nominee / work	Award	Result
1959	"The Chipmunk Song"	Best Engineered Record, Non-Classical	Won
1960	"Alvin's Harmonica"	Best Engineering Contribution – Novelty Recording	Won
1961	"Alvin for President"	Best Engineering Contribution – Novelty Recording	Nominated
1961	Let's All Sing with The Chipmunks	Best Engineering Contribution – Novelty Recording	Nominated
1962	The Alvin Show	Best Engineered Recording – Novelty	Nominated
