= Gene Sullivan (songwriter) =

American songwriter (1914–1984)

Gene Sullivan (November 16, 1914 – October 24, 1984) was an American songwriter.

== Early life and career ==
Gene Sullivan (William Eugene Sullivan) was born in 1914 in Birmingham, Alabama, to a coal miner. He worked in the mines from the age of 16 and pursued boxing professionally in his youth. His musical journey began with the purchase of his first guitar in 1932, leading to his involvement with Happy Hal Burns' Tune Wranglers and the Lone Star Cowboys in 1935, before joining The Shelton Brothers the following year. His roles with the Sheltons involved singing, guitar-playing, and comedy, and they broadcast via KWKH in Shreveport, Louisiana.

Sullivan's musical path crossed with Florida-born fiddler Wiley Walker, who joined The Shelton Brothers two years after Sullivan. Their shared journeys on the concert circuit led to their duet act, Wiley & Gene, formed in Dallas in 1939. They gained prominence on KFJZ radio in Fort Worth, Texas, and extended their broadcast to Oklahoma City via KWXX, which subsequently became their permanent residence.

The World War II era marked the zenith of Wiley & Gene's career. Their contributions included the composition and recording of "Live and Let Live" and "When My Blue Moon Turns to Gold Again" in 1941, songs that became classics, covered by numerous artists over the years.

The duo ventured into television in the late 1940s, becoming country TV pioneers in Oklahoma City. In 1946, they composed "Don't You Dare" and "An Empty Future". The same year, their single "Make Room in Your Heart for a Friend" charted #2 in 1946, marking their only country music hit. Despite solo pursuits—Sullivan's most notable being his 1957 Top 10 hit "Please Pass the Biscuits"—the pair reunited several times throughout the 1950s and 1960s. Post-music career, Sullivan managed a music store in Oklahoma City.
