= The Alvin Show (album) =

Soundtrack album by David Seville and Alvin and the Chipmunks
- Released: 1961
- Genre: Children's
- Length: 23:24
- Label: Liberty Records / Capitol
- Producer: Ross Bagdasarian

David Seville and Alvin and the Chipmunks chronology
Around the World with The Chipmunks (1960)	The Alvin Show (1961)	The Chipmunk Songbook (1962)

Professional ratings
Review scores
Source	Rating
Allmusic	3.5/5 stars

The Alvin Show is a music album by Alvin and the Chipmunks. It is the soundtrack album to the Chipmunks' first animated television series The Alvin Show. Upon the release of the album, the Chipmunks' first three albums were reissued with revised album cover art that utilized the cartoon redesigns of the characters.

== Track listing ==
=== Side one ===
1. "The Alvin Show Opening Theme" (Ross Bagdasarian) - 1:37
2. "The Mrs. Frumpington Story/Mrs. Frumpington's Song" (Ross Bagdasarian) - 6:38
3. "A Visit to France/I Wish I Could Speak French" (Ross Bagdasarian) - 3:48

=== Side two ===
1. "Television Interview/Chipmunk Fun" (Ross Bagdasarian) - 3:48
2. "Crashcup Invents the Bathtub/Crashcup's Work Theme (One Finger Waltz)" (based on "Sack Time") (Ross Bagdasarian Sr.) - 4:03
3. "Witch Doctor" (Ross Bagdasarian) – 2:22
4. "The Alvin Show Closing Theme" - 1:10

== Band lineup ==
Ross Bagdasarian Sr. provided the voices for the Chipmunks and David Seville.

- Alvin: Guitars and vocals
- Simon: Bass and vocals
- Theodore: Drums and vocals

=== Additional personnel ===
- Lee Patrick/June Foray – voice of Mrs. Frumpington
- Shepard Menken – voice of Clyde Crashcup; voice of "Harry" ("Television Interview/Chipmunk Fun" segment)

== Production crew ==
- Ross Bagdasarian Sr. – producer
- David Hassinger – engineer
- James Getzoff – orchestrator
