= Over the River =

Unrealized installation artwork by Christo and Jeanne-Claude

Over the River was an unrealized installation artwork by Christo and Jeanne-Claude that would have suspended silver fabric over six miles of Colorado's Arkansas River. Artsy described the work as the duo's most notable unrealized work.
