= Amy Patterson =

Argentinian composer (1912–2019)

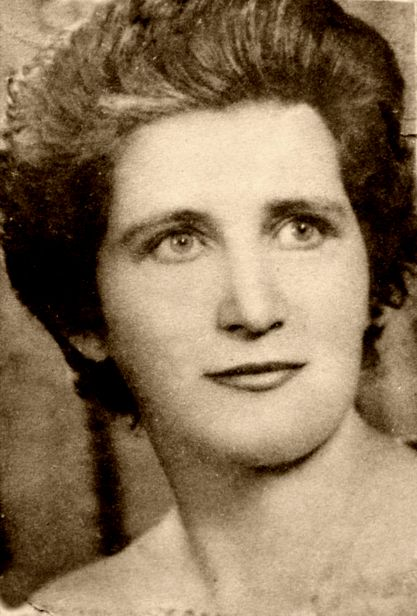
- Born: Amelia Cabeza de Pelayo Patterson; 16 July 1912; San Miguel de Tucumán
- Died: 28 December 2019 (aged 107); Salta
- Occupations: composer; singer; poet; teacher
- Years active: 1930–2019
- Spouse: Guillermo Pelayo Paterson

Amelia Cabeza de Pelayo Patterson (16 July 1912 – 28 December 2019) was an Argentine composer, singer, poet, and teacher responsible for writing the anthem of the Province of Salta. She was very popular in Argentina, and much of her music received state approval from the Ministry of Education of Argentina.

== Biography ==
Patterson was born in San Miguel de Tucumán, Tucumán Province, but at a young age her family moved to Argentina's capital, Buenos Aires. There, she learned how to play the violin and the piano, through private lessons.

After finishing high school, Patterson attended the Clementi Music School and graduated three years later as a music teacher specializing in the violin, according to the diploma awarded her by Argentina's Ministry of Education. She went on to study classical singing with a private tutor for seven years.

In 1946, Patterson found work as a music teacher at the Zorrilla, Alberdi and Peter Pan music schools, but resigned for personal reasons four years later. When she resigned from the Peter Pan school, she was given a gold medal for writing a version of The Adventures of Peter Pan, which had been presented twice consecutively at the Victoria Theater in Salta and at the Miter Theaters in San Salvador de Jujuy and San Miguel de Tucumán. Over the next decade, she would herself become a private tutor for the piano, violin, guitar, and singing. She was the Director of the Polyphonic Choir of Salta, which in 1962 gave 14 public and radio recitals.

She turned 100 in July 2012. Patterson died on 28 December 2019 at the age of 107.
