= Maurice Abrahams =

American songwriter (1883–1931)

- Born: March 18, 1883; Odessa, Russian Empire
- Died: April 13, 1931 (aged 48); New York City, United States
- Citizenship: American (from 1910)
- Occupations: Songwriter, music publisher
- Spouse: Belle Baker

Maurice Abrahams (March 18, 1883 – April 13, 1931) was an American songwriter and music publisher, who was successful in the early years of the 20th century.

== Biography ==
Abrahams was born in Odessa, Russian Empire, and emigrated to the US as a child in 1892, becoming a naturalized citizen in 1910. He became a songwriter, writing popular ragtime songs in Tin Pan Alley in New York City. Successful songs co-written by Abrahams included "Hitchy-Koo" (1912, written with L. Wolfe Gilbert and Lewis F. Muir); "Ragtime Cowboy Joe" (1912, written with Muir and Grant Clarke); and "He'd Have to Get Under — Get Out and Get Under (to Fix Up His Automobile)" (1913, written with Clarke and Edgar Leslie). His biggest success, "Ragtime Cowboy Joe", was a pop hit for Bob Roberts (1912), Pinky Tomlin (1939), Eddy Howard (1947), Jo Stafford (1949), and David Seville and the Chipmunks (1959).

== Marital influence ==
Some of his songs were written for his wife, the vaudeville performer Belle Baker, whom he married in 1919.

Abrahams became manager of several music publishing firms, before starting his own publishing business in 1923.

== Death ==
He died in New York in 1931, aged 48.
