= Emma Seehofer =

German opera singer

Emma Seehofer (before 1854 – 1912) was a German operatic contralto who was a principal artist at the Bavarian State Opera in Munich from 1854 to 1887. She created the roles of Erda in Richard Wagner's Das Rheingold on 22 September 1869 and Schwertleite (one of the Valkyries) in Wagner's Die Walküre on 26 June 1870. She was also highly active as a concert singer. After retiring from the stage, she worked as a singing teacher in Munich. She died at Mannheim.
