= Eliška Kleinová =

Czech Jewish pianist and music educator

Eliška Kleinová, born Elisabeth "Lisa" Klein (February 27, 1912, Přerov, Moravia – September 2, 1999, Prague) was a Czech Jewish pianist and music educator. She was the sister of Gideon Klein.

Eliška Kleinová was born as a daughter of Jindřich/Heinrich Klein, and Helene (born Ilona Marmorstein).

== See also ==
- Gideon Klein
- Viktor Ullmann
