= Lewis F. Muir =

- Born: Louis Meuer; May 30, 1883
- Died: December 3, 1915 (aged 32)
- Occupations: Composer, pianist
- Years active: 1904-1915

Lewis F. Muir, born Louis Meuer (May 30, 1883 – December 3, 1915) was an American composer and ragtime pianist.

== Biography ==
Originally a millinery peddler, Muir started as a pianist in St. Louis cafes and played in the St. Louis World's Fair in 1904. He moved to New York in 1910. His first published composition was "Play That Barber-Shop Chord" from 1910. Vaudeville entertainer Bert Williams used the song in his shows. Other compositions published by Muir in 1910–1911 include "Oh, You Bear Cat Rag", "The Matrimony Rag" and "When Ragtime Rosie Ragged the Rosary". In 1912, he collaborated with Maurice Abrahams in composing music for the song Ragtime Cowboy Joe.

Journalist L. Wolfe Gilbert criticized Muir's use of the Catholic rosary in the name of a ragtime piece, which he considered sacrilegious. Muir confronted Gilbert in person and, after a heated argument, challenged Gilbert to write a song with him. The result was a romantic song called "Do You Feel It in the Air?" and "Waiting For The Robert E. Lee", the latter becoming the best-known title written by either man. This version of events is somewhat contradicted by Gilbert himself, who said in an interview: " One day I was given a chance to write some stuff for the Clipper, which assured me of my room rent. About this time I met Lew Muir, and he asked me why his songs did not "get over." I told him I thought they were too clever for the average theatre audience. He asked me if I would write some songs with him, but I couldn't see any money in them and refused. Later he brought me a melody that I liked and I took a chance on it and made a few dollars, and shortly after we turned out the ' Robert E. Lee. ' After that everything was plain sailing."

Muir composed productively in 1912–1913 and travelled to London with pianist Pete Wendling to play ragtime in the Oxford Theatre. He also collaborated with Italian composer Ruggero Leoncavallo. In 1914 published "Camp Meeting Band," "Buy a Bale of Cotton for Me," "I Had a Gal, I Had a Pal" and "Mooching Along". Lewis F. Muir died of tuberculosis on December 3, 1915, at the age of 32.
