= Bob Roberts (singer) =

American singer-songwriter

- Also known as: "Ragtime" Bob Roberts, Robert Roberts
- Born: Robert S. Roberts; April 27, 1871; Cincinnati, Ohio, United States
- Died: January 21, 1930 (aged 58) Cincinnati, Ohio, US
- Genres: Novelty, vaudeville
- Occupations: Singer, composer
- Instrument: Vocal
- Years active: 1897–c.1920
- Labels: Columbia, Edison, Victor, Indestructible, others

Robert S. Roberts (April 27, 1871 – January 21, 1930), (Note: While some sources including Gracyk and Sutton give his middle initial as A., and his year of birth as 1879, copyright records, 1900 US Census, the 1910 census, the 1920 census, and a 1920 marriage certificate record him as Robert S. Roberts, with a birth year of 1871, which is the most likely year. Cemetery records give his middle initial as S., but his birth year as 1879, which is clearly incorrect given the concurrence of other sources.) sometimes referred to as "Ragtime" Bob Roberts, was an American novelty singer and ragtime song composer in the early years of the 20th century.

== Biography ==
He was born in Cincinnati, Ohio, the son of Nicholas (Nick) Roberts, a well-known clown who became the proprietor of one of the country's leading touring pantomime companies, and his French-born wife Augustine C. Zahn. Bob Roberts is assumed to have traveled widely with his father's shows in his youth, and indeed for the 1880 census when he was 9-years-old, his mother and brother were found lodging in a Richmond, New York hotel while father and son were performing somewhere nearby. Roberts, who had published compositions in Cincinnati as early as 1897, made his recording debut for Columbia Records in 1900, and initially recorded remakes of other artists' cylinders before starting to make recordings of new songs. Among the most successful of his early recordings for Columbia were "Hurrah For Baffin's Bay" and "By The Sycamore Tree", both in 1903.

Roberts also recorded for Edison, Victor, and other companies. He recorded prolifically, recording some songs for several different labels. One of his biggest comedy successes was with "The Woodchuck Song", written by Theodore Morse, with a chorus of "How much wood would a woodchuck chuck if a woodchuck could chuck wood?", which he recorded in 1904 for Edison, Columbia, Victor, and Zon-O-Phone Records. He also recorded for both Edison and Columbia as part of a duo with Albert Campbell.

He was at the peak of his recording career between 1903 and 1907, when he rivaled Billy Murray for popularity, and received a similar payment of $30 (equivalent to $905 in 2023) for each recording. He and Murray occasionally recorded together, as on "Oh! Oh! Sallie", in 1905. Roberts was a leading exponent of the comedic "coon song", such as "Wouldn't It Make You Hungry", written by Harry Von Tilzer, and "I'm Satisfied", many of them recorded for Zon-o-phone, a subsidiary of Victor.

The number of his recordings started to diminish around 1908, perhaps because he devoted more of his time to stage performances. Roberts spent long periods touring in vaudeville, where he became a popular monologist, and was a leading attraction at the Regal Theater in Los Angeles. However, he also continued to record for Edison, Columbia, Victor, and other labels such as Indestructible.

He had further popular success in 1911 with his recording of "Woodman, Woodman, Spare That Tree", from the Ziegfeld Follies of 1911, and in 1912 with the earliest recording of "Ragtime Cowboy Joe", for Victor Records. He did not record for any of the major companies after 1913 but, between 1914 and 1917, recorded for the Rex Talking Machine Company as Robert Roberts, including a duet with fellow vaudevillian Elida Morris.

By the 1920s, Roberts had given up touring and returned to live in Cincinnati. He was married there on 14 December 1920, to Catherine De Vine. According to Jim Walsh, he ran a pool hall there, and in the late 1920s appeared on radio station WCKY in a show called "Adolph and Otto".

He died in 1930.

== See also ==
- How much wood would a woodchuck chuck
