= Sari Biro =

Hungarian pianist

Sári Bíró
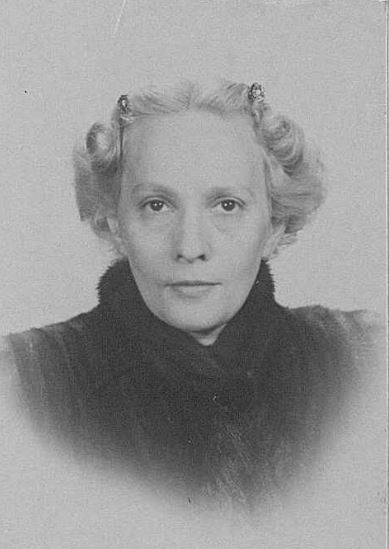
- Sári Bíró c. 1951

Background information
- Born: March 24, 1907; Budapest, Transleithania, Austria-Hungary
- Died: September 2, 1990 (aged 83); San Francisco, United States
- Occupation(s): Pianist, music teacher, television personality
- Instrument: piano

Sari Biro (March 24, 1907 – September 2, 1990) was a Hungarian pianist.

Sari Biro was born in Budapest, Hungary. She began piano lessons privately at the age of six, and received a scholarship to study at the Franz Liszt Royal Academy. There she quickly distinguished herself, so that she was chosen as the soloist in the inaugural concert of the Hungarian national broadcasting system, playing under the baton of Ernst von Dohnányi (Erno Dohnáni).

She arrived in the US in 1939. Based in New York City, for the next 18 years she toured extensively in the U.S., South America, Mexico, Cuba, and Puerto Rico, as well as making numerous radio broadcasts which were notable for the eclectic repertoire they introduced. She also presented an innovative 13-week series of live television programs in 1958, in which she talked about composers, compositions and performed. She championed both early and contemporary music, performing works by Giancarlo Menotti; Darius Milhaud; Leó Weiner (with whom she had studied in Budapest); and Béla Bartók, who admired her interpretations of his works. She also made the first recording by a woman of Mussorgsky's Pictures at an Exhibition in 1951.

In 1949, the U.S. State Department named Sari Biro the most distinguished new citizen of the year. Also in that year, she became the only woman to perform nine piano concertos in three consecutive programs at Carnegie Hall.

The Sari Biro Memorial Award (Emlek Dij) was established in 1995 at the Franz Liszt University in Budapest, Hungary. The award is given each March 24 (Mme. Biro's birthday) in the form of a monetary prize to an outstanding young piano student at the academy.
