= Lina Ramann =

German 19th century classical music biographer

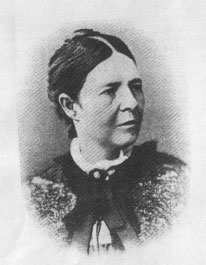
Lina Ramann

Lina Ramann (24 July 1833 – 30 March 1912) was a German writer and teacher known for her books on the Hungarian composer and pianist Franz Liszt.

In 1858 Ramann founded a music school in Glückstadt together with her life partner, the pianist Ida Volckmann. The music school was moved to Nuremberg in 1865, and sold to August Gollerich in 1890.

In 1874 Ramann published Franz Liszts Oratorium Christus, securing her entry into Liszt's circle. Between 1874 and Liszt's death in 1886, she interviewed him, sent him questionnaires, and had access to all of his manuscripts and publications in his library. She wrote his authorized biography and the first in-depth critical analysis of his works, all of which were published in three volumes as Franz Liszt als Künstler und Mensch ("Franz Liszt, the artist and man") between 1880 and 1894.

It was once believed that Ramann passively received direction from Liszt's second mistress Carolyne zu Sayn-Wittgenstein. However, the eventual publication of Lisztiana (1983) showed the extensiveness of Ramann's own researches. Sayn-Wittgenstein succeeded in ensuring that Ramann cast Liszt's first mistress Marie d'Agoult, recently deceased, in a poor light. But after 1878 there was significant dispute between Ramann and Say-Wittgenstein, with Ramann pushing back strongly:

Do you really think that I am an instrument whose mechanism can be controlled according to the will of the player? Can I see only with your eyes, think only your thoughts, feel only your feelings?
