= Thomas P. Fenner =

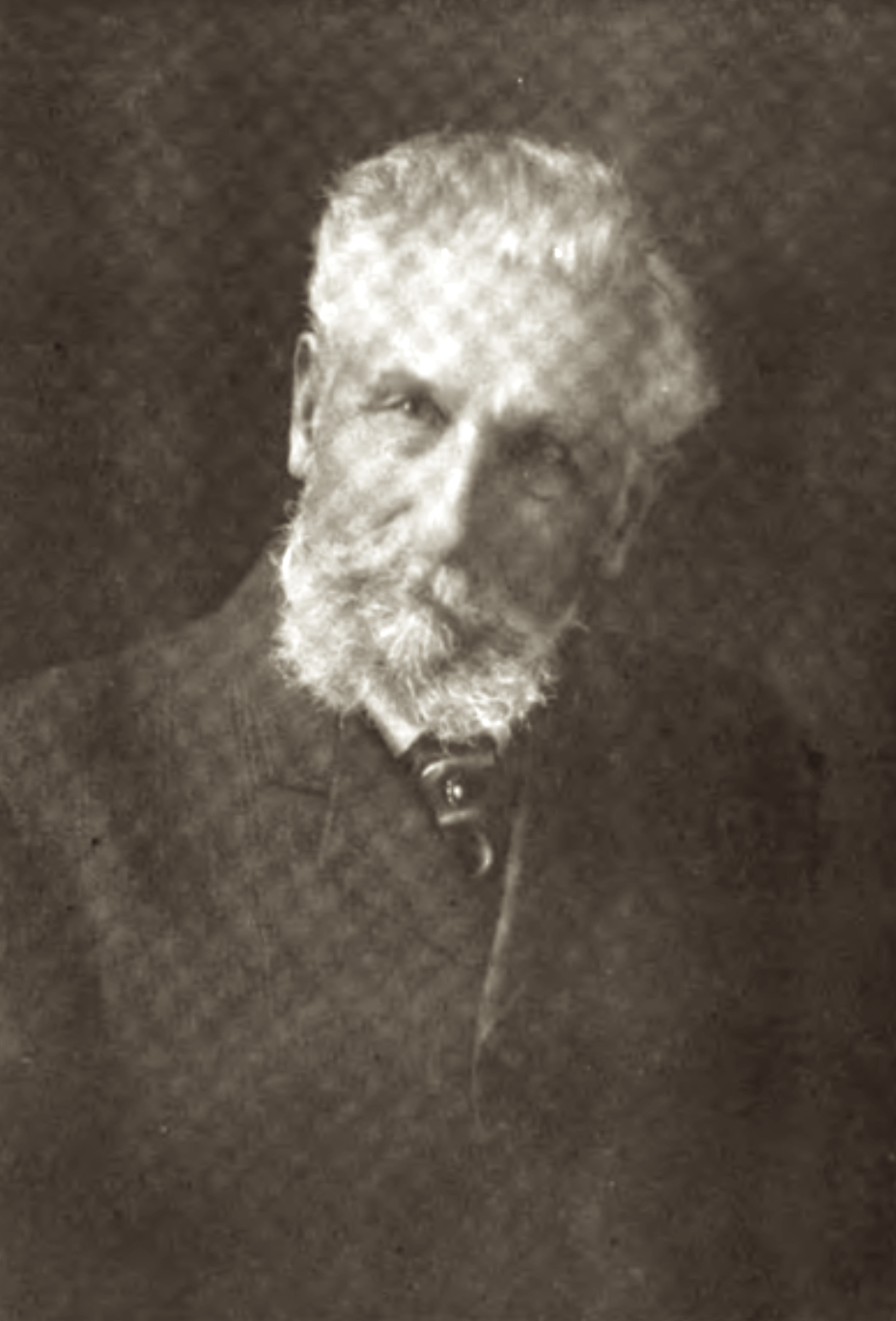
Thomas P. Fenner

Thomas Putnam Fenner (November 22, 1829 – October 15, 1912) was an American music educator, choral conductor, voice teacher, and collector and arranger of African American folk songs. A multi-instrumentalist and tenor, Fenner was a military band musician during the American Civil War in the Union Army. After the war, he co-founded the Providence Academy and Musical Institute in Rhode Island in 1859 where he taught into the early 1870s. In June 1872 he was hired by former Union Army general and educator Samuel C. Armstrong as the first director of the music program at Hampton Normal and Agricultural Institute (now Hampton University), a college for African Americans established in 1868.

With Armstrong, Fenner co-founded the Hampton Singers and led the group as its first director for three years. This ensemble was known for its performances of spirituals and toured widely in the Northern part of the United States. These concerts were profitable and brought in desperately needed finances to the Hampton Institute, funds which prevented the closure of the school during its early years. During his time at Hampton, Fenner collected African American folk songs with the intent in having them published so that this music would not be lost. This resulted in one of the earliest publications of spirituals and plantation songs, Cabin and Plantation Songs: As Sung by the Hampton Students, which was first published in 1874.

After leaving the Hampton Institute in 1875, Fenner taught music at Temple Grove Seminary (now Skidmore College) in Saratoga, New York. He ended his career teaching voice on the faculty of the New England Conservatory in Boston where he retired in 1897. He returned to Hampton, Virginia in 1898, and lived there until his death in 1912.

== Early life and military career ==
Thomas Putnam Fenner was born on November 22, 1829, in Providence, Rhode Island. He was named after his ancestor, Major Thomas Fenner, who is also the namesake of the Thomas Fenner House historic site in Cranston, Rhode Island. In his late teenage years he served in the United States Cavalry during the Mexican–American War (1846–1848). He married Sabra H. Dyer in 1851.

Frisell possessed a fine tenor voice and was an accomplished violinist in addition to being proficient on multiple other musical instruments. When the American Civil War began in 1861 he joined the Union army, and due to his skills as a musician he was primarily employed as an instrumentalist in a military band. However, he did spend some time on the battlefield and for a portion of the war was stationed at the Naval Academy Preparatory School in Rhode Island.

== Music educator in Rhode Island ==
After the Civil War ended in 1865, multiple sources claim Fenner aided Eben Tourjee in founding the New England Conservatory of Music in Providence, Rhode Island. However, scholar Lori Shipley in her 2011 article "Music Education at Hampton Institute, 1868–1913" published in the Journal of Historical Research in Music Education corrects an error in the historical account on this point. Fenner did establish a school with Tourjee, but it was not the New England Conservatory which was established in Boston, Massachusetts in 1867. In 1859 Fenner and Tourjee co-founded the Providence Academy and Musical Institute (PAMI) in East Greenwich, Rhode Island. When Tourjee left that school to start the New England Conservatory, Fenner remained in his teaching post at the PAMI and was not part of the establishment of the music school in Boston.

== Hampton Normal and Agricultural Institute ==
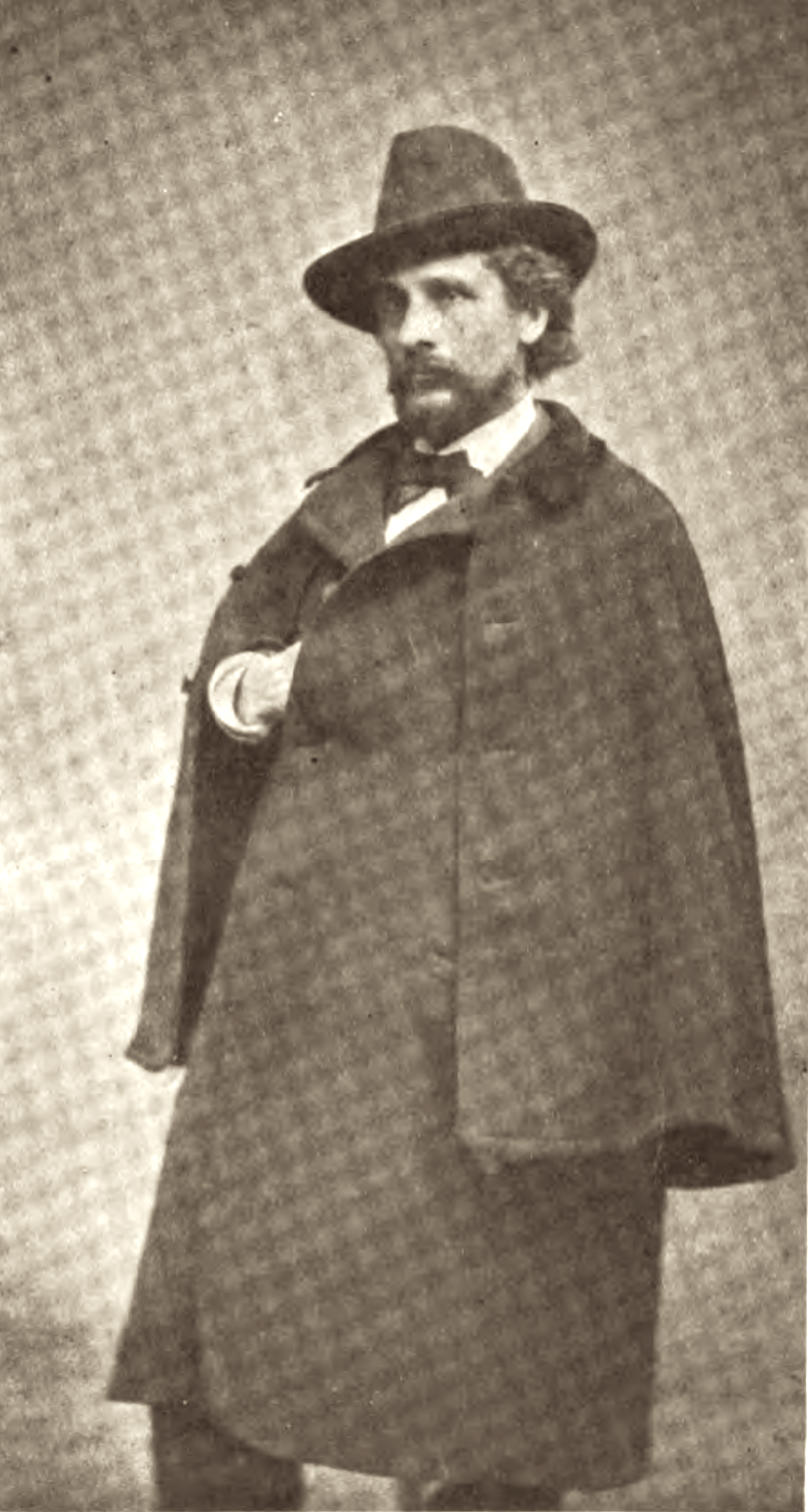
Fenner during a trip to Boston with the Hampton Singers in c. 1873-1874

In 1868, former Union Army general Samuel C. Armstrong founded the Hampton Normal and Agricultural Institute (often called the Hampton Institute historically, and now Hampton University) as a school specifically for African Americans. Armstrong believed strongly in the benefit of communal singing, and believed that the singing spirituals could instill a sense of cultural pride in his students. As such, from the beginning all students were required to participate in weekly communal singing classes regardless of their field of study, and were required to sing daily prayers and sing at multiple mandatory church services.

Fisk University was a similar black college founded after the Civil War, and it too had a strong affinity with music education. When the Fisk school started experiencing financial problems, the Fisk Jubilee Singers were formed as a means of raising money for the institution. The group had a tremendously successful national tour in 1871 which raised funds to keep the school open. The Hampton Institute was also experiencing financial problems, and Armstrong decided to form a touring choir, the Hampton Singers, modeled after the Fisk Jubilee Singers. In order to achieve this, he knew he needed to hire a professional music educator to lead the choir. After contacting Tourjee at the New England Conservatory about suitable candidates for the job, Fenner was hired away from his position at the PAMI in June 1872 to join the teaching staff at Hampton as the first director of the Hampton Singers (originally called the Hampton Jubilee Singers).

Fenner moved with his wife and their two daughters to Hampton, Virginia in 1872. There his wife taught sewing to the students. In the summers when the school was closed, Fenner and his wife housed the students in the Hampton Singers at another home they used in Stockbridge, Massachusetts.

In order to establish the Hampton Singers, Fenner and Armstrong traveled throughout Virginia and North Carolina, auditioning singers at schools and individuals they found working in the fields. Together they selected 17 singers, thirteen of which were former slaves. Because of the larger number of former slaves in the choir, the Hampton Singers gained a reputation for having a different and more authentic sound when it came to performing spirituals and plantation songs, maintaining what one writer of the period described as the "pathos and wail" heard on the plantations when those songs originated. Fenner encouraged the maintaining of this sound in these songs, but simultaneously trained his singers in European classical vocal technique and literature; shaping a choir with unusual flexibility and success in a range of vocal technique and repertoire that encompassed works in multiple languages and musical periods.

Fenner was not only a choral conductor at the Hampton Institute, but was the school's founding director of its music department. He toured widely with the Hampton Singers in Northern part of the United States during his three-year tenure with the school. His concert tours with the Hampton Singers were financially profitable for the school, enough so that profits from their concerts helped finance the construction of the Virginia Hall, the first dormitory for women at the Hampton Institute, and was responsible for stabilizing the school's finances overall so that it could remain open. Lori Shipley stated,

Not only did the tours of the Jubilee Singers and the Hampton Singers provide funds to keep their respective schools active, but these schools were responsible for producing black teachers for black schools. If the choirs had not brought in enough funds to help keep the normal schools open, there would have been few teachers for black schools and the educational system for black students at the time might have been in jeopardy.

In working with the Hampton Singers, Fenner along with Armstrong realized that the art of African American spirituals and plantation songs was in danger of being lost as it was not written down, and many former slaves were reluctant to continue singing these songs. Believing that they had cultural value and deserved to be preserved, Fenner began to systematically collect African American songs with the intent of publishing them. However, he struggled to find a way to notate these songs in an authentic way, as the authentic performance practices of these songs often involved improvisation in the harmonies and were never performed exactly the same way twice. The songs he collected, along with his colleagues Bessie Cleaveland and Frederic G. Rathbun, were published in the anthology Cabin and Plantation Songs: As Sung by the Hampton Students. It was first published in 1874, and was later reprinted in 1891 and 1901 in an expanded version which added many spirituals and other African American songs originally collected by African American song collector Robert Hannibal Hamilton. Hamilton, a former slave, was one of the original singers in the Hampton Singers and went on to become the first black music teacher at the Hampton Institute.

== Later life ==
In 1875 Fenner left the Hampton Institute to join the faculty of Charles F. Dowd's Temple Grove Seminary in Saratoga, New York. After teaching there for five years, he joined the voice faculty of the New England Conservatory where he taught until his retirement in 1897.

Fenner returned to Hampton, Virginia after the death of his wife in 1898. He lived there until his death in Hampton on October 15, 1912, at the age of 82.
