= None but the Brave (soundtrack) =

1965 film score by John Williams

None but the Brave: Original Motion Picture Soundtrack

Film score by John Williams
- Released: June 2009
- Recorded: October 14–November 11, 1964
- Studio: Warner Bros. Studios Burbank
- Genre: Film score
- Length: 54:28 (film score); 65:49 (including extras)
- Label: FSM

John Williams chronology
None but the Brave: Original Motion Picture Soundtrack (2009)	John Goldfarb, Please Come Home! (1965)

None but the Brave: Original Motion Picture Soundtrack is the soundtrack album for the 1965 film None but the Brave, composed by John Williams and conducted by Morris Stoloff. Recorded at Warner Bros. Studios Burbank from October to November 1964, the soundtrack is particularly notable as one of Williams' earliest film scores and was his largest and most ambitious yet at the time. It was released by Film Score Monthly in June 2009 as part of their Silver Age Classics series.

Orchestration came from Albert Woodbury, with Stoloff conducting and overseeing, and Dan Wallin handling the mix. Sessions occurred at Warner Bros. Studios Burbank's scoring stage on October 14, 22, 26, and November 11, 1964. It is one of the few film scores written by Williams that he did not conduct, and this has been attributed to Williams likely being occupied with John Goldfarb, Please Come Home! at the time.

== Track listing ==
Film score
No.	Title	Length
1.	"Main Title/Kuroki's Introduction"	3:41
2.	"The Boat Detail"	1:47
3.	"Busy Hands/Kuroki Prepares for War/Fishing Spear"	2:03
4.	"Night Adventure"	3:26
5.	"The Enemies Repair"	1:42
6.	"Ship in Sight/When Enemies Meet/Okuda Whistles/Kuroki's Challenge/Connection"	7:28
7.	"Brothers in Command/The Water Hole"	2:59
8.	"Water Logged"	2:05
9.	"Waiting for Battle"	1:45
10.	"The Dream of Hope Is Ashes/Hirano's Problem"	4:40
11.	"The Bargain/Mahoney Gets the News"	1:32
12.	"Uneasy Peace/Okuda and Craddock"	3:49
13.	"Kuroki's Reflection"	2:10
14.	"Mahoney's Reflection/Mahoney's Analysis"	3:26
15.	"Okuda and the Shark"	1:31
16.	"Good Friends Part/Radio Contact"	2:09
17.	"The Separation"	1:43
18.	"The Final Fight/The Spirit Lives/End Cast"	5:59
Total length:		54:28

Bonus Tracks
No.	Title	Length
1.	"Piano Theme"	1:40
2.	"Word From Waikiki"	1:15
3.	"Kuroki's Introduction (alternate #1)"	1:05
4.	"Kuroki's Introduction (alternate #2)"	1:05
5.	"Trailer"	0:48
Total length:		6:07

Single recording
No.	Title	Length
1.	"None But the Brave"	2:22
2.	"Sylvia"	2:46
Total length:		5:10
