= Alvin's Harmonica =

Single by David Seville and The Chipmunks

from the album Let's All Sing with The Chipmunks
- B-side: "Mediocre"
- Released: February 20, 1959
- Recorded: January 1, 1959
- Genre: Pop
- Length: 2:39
- Label: Liberty
- Songwriter(s): Ross Bagdasarian, Sr.
- Producer(s): Ross Bagdasarian, Sr.

The Chipmunks singles chronology
| "The Chipmunk Song (Christmas Don't Be Late)" (1958) | "Alvin's Harmonica" (1959) | "Ragtime Cowboy Joe" (1959) |

"Alvin's Harmonica" is a song from the fictional musical group, Alvin and the Chipmunks, which also features additional vocals by Ross Bagdasarian, Sr. who plays David Seville in the song. The song was released as the second single from the group's debut album, Let's All Sing with the Chipmunks in 1959. Like "Witch Doctor" and "The Chipmunk Song", it was adapted as one of the musical segments featured in The Alvin Show.

== Recording ==
A contemporary writeup describes Bagdasarian’s production sequence:

“It took nine perfect tapes, or tracks, and three days’ work in the recording studio, to transfer this work from the composer’s head to acetate. First, having set down a melody, he recorded it a simplified orchestra—two saxophones, four rhythm instruments—at normal speed. Then on a second tape he recorded two pianos playing at half speed. Played back at normal speed, the pianos had a tinkly, mandolin-like sound. Bagdasarian made a third tape of his own normal voice at normal speed, shouting ‘Alvin!’, ‘Stop that!’ and the like. The fourth tape was Simon, the lowest voiced of the three chipmunks in the song. His lines were recorded in a normal voice at half speed, then played back at normal speed to produce a squeaky tone. By this time the control booth of the recording studio was filling up with tape like a cauldron of spaghetti, so the first four tapes were combined on a fifth. The sixth tape was a variation for Theodore, the laughing chipmunk: ‘Ha…Ha…Ha’ spoken carefully at half speed in a tone pitched slightly higher than Simon’s. The seventh was Alvin’s, also at half speed and pitched highest of all. An eighth track was added for the harmonica, normal speed. Finally one master tape combined all the others in one glorious tonal conglomeration.”

== Chart performance ==
After the group's previous single, "The Chipmunk Song", reached No. 1 on the charts, it was hoped that "Alvin's Harmonica" would reach the Top Ten. The single peaked at No. 3 on Billboard's Pop Singles Chart, becoming the group's second consecutive (and final) Top 10 single on the charts. Since the song was also credited to David Seville by Billboard, the song became his third consecutive Top 10 single on the charts, although it was his first to not reach No. 1. In Canada it also reached No. 1.

"Alvin's Harmonica" sold more than 500,000 singles making it a certified gold record.

"Alvin's Harmonica" re-entered the charts in 1961 and 1962, peaking at No. 73 and No. 87, respectively.

== Track listing ==
All tracks are written by Ross Bagdasarian Sr.

| No. | Title | Credited artist | Length |
|---|---|---|---|
| 1. | "Alvin's Harmonica" | David Seville and The Chipmunks | 2:39 |
| 2. | "Mediocre" | The Music of David Seville | 1:50 |
