= The Tune Wranglers =

Western swing band from San Antonio, Texas

The Tune Wranglers were a Western swing band from San Antonio, Texas, popular in the 1930s.

The group formed in 1935, and its original membership included Buster Coward (vocals, guitar), Eddie Fielding (banjo), and Charlie Gregg (vocals, fiddle). Fielding was replaced by Joe Barnes (known as Red Brown) soon after, and around 1936 Eddie Duncan joined on steel guitar. Fiddler Leonard Seago and Noah Hatley also played with the group for a short period. They played most often in Texas and Mexico, where they received airplay on border radio stations such as WOAI and KTSA.

From 1936 they recorded for Bluebird Records, both under their own name in English and under the name Tono Hombres in Spanish. In total, they recorded about 80 tunes, including a session of Hawaiian-style songs with banjoist/reeds twins Neal & Beal.
