= Julia Crouch =

Julia Crouch may refer to:

- Julia Crouch (novelist)
- Julia Crouch (diplomat)
