= Loïc Espuche =

French film director (born 1989)

- Born: September 17, 1989 (age 36); Villeurbanne
- Citizenship: French
- Occupation: Animation director
- Known for: Yuck! Tombés du Nid

Loïc Espuche is a French Oscar-nominated animation director born in Villeurbanne, France. He is mostly known for directing award-winning short films Yuck! (2023) and Tombés du nid (eng. "Fallen from the nest") (2015), his graduation film from the animation school La Poudrière.

== Career ==
Espuche graduated from La Martinière Diderot in Visual Communication and then pursued training in animation and directing at French animation schools École des métiers du cinéma d'animation (EMCA) and La Poudrière.

After graduating, Espuche worked as storyboard artist on feature film I Lost My Body (2019) and on TV series, such as The Ollie & Moon Show (2017) and The Treehouse Stories (2017). He also worked on feature films The State Against Nelson Mandela And the Others (2018) as animator and Marona's Fantastic Tale (2019) as supervising animator, before directing his short film Yuck! (2023).

He is currently developing the TV series What's Up Eesha? with French animation studio TeamTO.

== Filmography ==
=== Film ===
- 2013: Je repasserai dans la semaine (short film) - co-director with Alizée Cholat and Sophie Devautour.
- 2015: Les Chocottes (short film) - director.
- 2015: Tombés du nid (short film) - director.
- 2016: Mutation (short film) - director.
- 2018: The State Against Mandela And the Others (feature film) - animator. Directed by Nicolas Champeaux and Gilles Porte.
- 2019: I Lost My Body (feature film) - storyboard artist. Directed by Jérémy Clapin.
- 2019: Marona's Fantastic Tale (feature film) - supervising animator. Directed by Anca Damian.
- 2023: Yuck! (short film) - director.

=== TV series ===
- 2017: The Treehouse Stories (season 1 and 2) - storyboard artist. Directed by Célia Rivière and Estelle Chauvin.
- 2017: The Ollie & Moon Show (season 1 and 2) - storyboard artist. Created by Caroline Simpson.
- 2018: La Petite Mort (season 2 and 3) - director.

== Recognition ==
Espuche's films have won several awards at international film festivals, including the Best Short Film for Children Award at the 2024 Festival international du film d'animation de Bruxelles, the Best Animated Short Award at the 2024 Austin Film Festival, and the 2024 Benshi Children's Award at the Annecy International Animation Film Festival for the short film Yuck! (2023).

In 2015, Espuche won the Best Young Talent Award (in French "Prix des Espoirs de l'animation") from the french TV channel Canal J with his film Les Chocottes (2015).

His graduation film Tombés du nid (2015) ("Fallen from the nest") won the Audience Award at Festival Premiers Plans d'Angers and the Best Student Film Award at the 2016 Festival international de cinéma d'animation de Meknès.

On January 23rd, 2025, Espuche received his first Academy Award nomination for the film Yuck! (2023), alongside producer Juliette Marquet. The film was also nominated to the 50th César Awards in the Best Short Animation category.
