= Yuck! (film) =

2024 French animated short film

- Film poster
- French: Beurk !
- Directed by: Loïc Espuche
- Written by: Loïc Espuche
- Produced by: Juliette Marquet; Manon Messiant
- Starring: Noé Chabbat; Katell Varvat; Enzo Desmedt; Camille Bouisson; Hugo Chauvel; Roman Freud; Mattias Marcussy; Mokhtar Camara; Olivia Chatain; Théo Costa-Marini
- Edited by: Héloïse Pelloquet
- Music by: Aliénor Doublet
- Production companies: Ikki Films; Iliade et Films
- Distributed by: Miyu Distribution
- Release dates: 20 February 2024 (Berlin International Film Festival, Germany)
- Running time: 13 minutes
- Country: France
- Language: French

Yuck! (French: Beurk !) is a 2024 French animated short film written and directed by Loïc Espuche. The 13-minute animated film about childhood and the discovery of love won awards in various international film festivals, including the Anima Film Festival 2024 in Belgium. It also was presented in festivals around the world, including Annecy International Animation Film Festival, Rhode Island International Film Festival or Berlin International Film Festival. The film was also nominated for the César Award for Best Animation Short. On January 23rd, 2025, the film was also nominated to the 97th Academy Awards in the Best Animated Short Film category.

== Plot ==
Léo is a young boy spending his summer days on a campground with his family and friends, including his two siblings and his good friend, Lucie. The kids enjoy spying on older campers and become disgusted watching them kiss, especially as their lips become hot pink and shiny when they desire affection. Despite this pastime, Léo secretly has a crush on Lucie and grows increasingly interested in kissing her. However, since his friends are so adamant that the act of kissing is repulsive, Léo is too embarrassed to make his feelings known.

After spying on two friends about to kiss while alone, Léo realizes that kissing does not have to be disgusting. He approaches Lucie in private, and his lips turn pink. Lucie is receptive to his advances and guides him away so that they can kiss in private. However, their friends intercept them at the last moment, mocking them for the "perverted" desire to kiss. Léo runs away in tears. When Lucie tries to talk to him later and try again, he angrily rebuffs her.

That night, Léo wakes up to realize that both of his siblings, despite their earlier teasing, have pink lips as they dream, revealing their secret desire for affection. He leaves his tent and observes that the whole campground is glowing pink with the universal need for affection. Seeing that Lucie has also left her tent and is seeing the same thing, Léo makes up with her, and the two share their first innocent kiss.

== Accolades ==
Year	Festivals	Award/Category	Status
2024	Berlinale	Generation Kplus 2024	Nominated
2024	Annecy International Animated Film Festival	Students "Coup de Coeur" for a short film for young audiences	Won
2024	Brussels International Animation Film Festival	Best Short Movie for Kids	Won
2024	Lago Film Fest	Unicef Kids Award 2024	Won
2024	Flickers' Rhode Island Film Festival	Moments of Reverie – Short Film Showcase	Nominated
2024	Curtas Vila do Conde International Film Festival	Audience Award International Competition	Won
2025	Annie Awards	Outstanding Achievement for Writing in an Animated Television/Broadcast Production	Nominated
2025	Annie Awards	Best Animated Special Production	Nominated
2025	César Awards	Best Short Animation	Won
2025	Academy Awards	Best Animated Short Film	Nominated

== See also ==
- Cinema of France
