= Tim Crouch =

British theatre maker, actor, writer and director

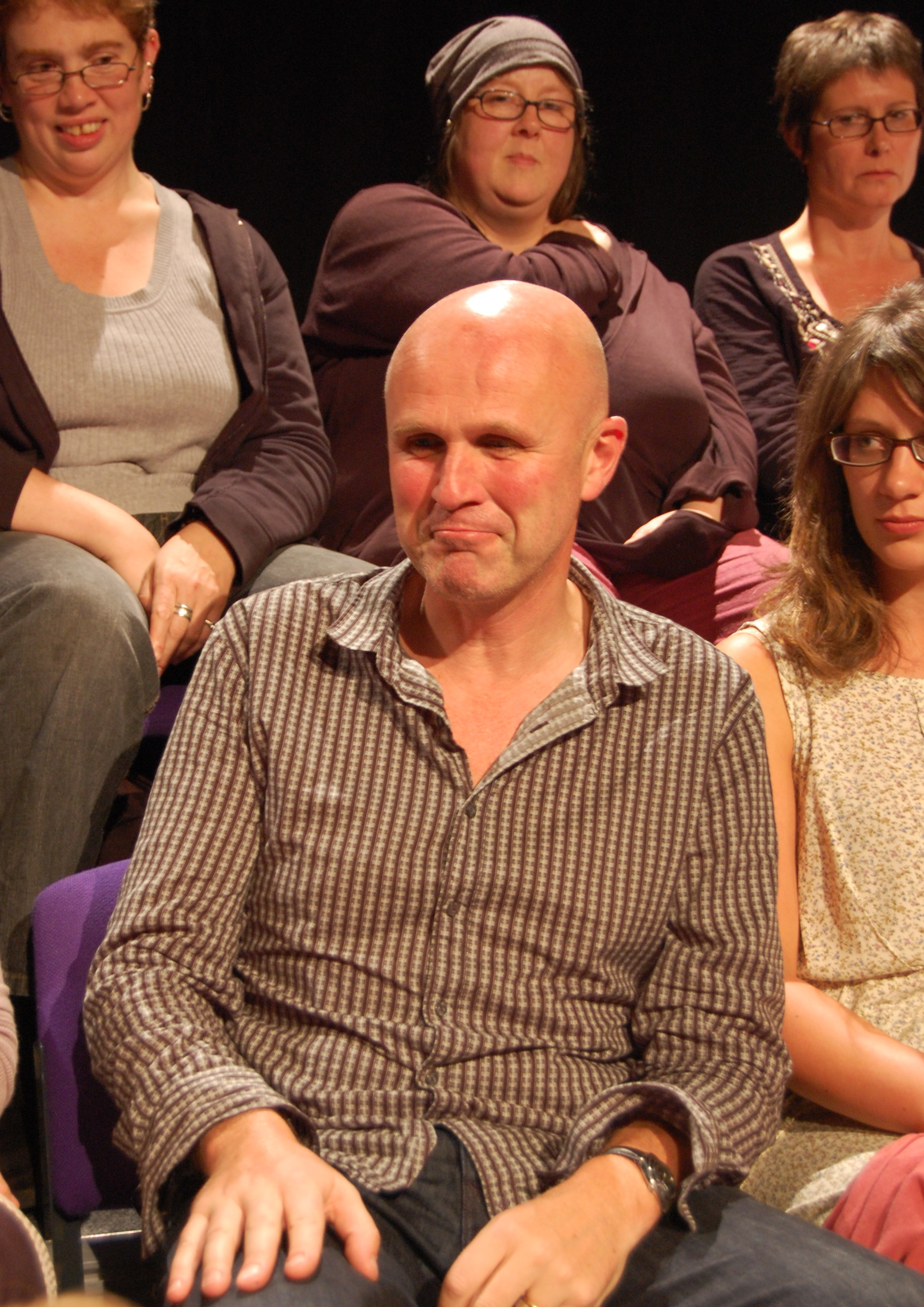
- Crouch in 2010
- Born: 18 March 1964 (age 62); Bognor Regis, England
- Education: Royal Central School of Speech and Drama
- Occupations: Playwright, theatre director, actor
- Style: Experimental theatre
- Website: www.timcrouchtheatre.co.uk

Tim Crouch (born 18 March 1964) is a British experimental theatre maker, actor, writer and director. His plays include My Arm, An Oak Tree, ENGLAND, and The Author. These take various forms, but all reject theatrical conventions, especially realism, and invite the audience to help create the work. Interviewed in 2007, Crouch said, "Theatre in its purest form is a conceptual artform. It doesn't need sets, costumes and props, but exists inside an audience's head."

Stephen Bottoms, Professor of Contemporary Theatre & Performance at the University of Manchester, has written that Crouch's plays "make up one of the most important bodies of English-language playwriting to have emerged so far in the twenty-first century... I can think of no other contemporary playwright who has asked such a compelling set of questions about theatrical form, narrative content, and spectatorial engagement."

Holly Williams, writing in The Independent in June 2014, says, "Crouch has built a name for himself as one of British drama's great innovators, with plays that have disturbed and challenged the passive theatrical experience."

== Acting ==
Crouch, originally from Bognor Regis, did a BA in drama at Bristol University and a postgraduate acting diploma at the Central School of Speech and Drama. While still at Bristol, he co-founded the theatre company, Public Parts, with his wife, the director and writer, Julia Crouch. They worked on eight devised productions, which were performed in "all sorts of venues - from caves in Gloucestershire, to prisons, schools, and major national theatres like the Bristol Old Vic, West Yorkshire Playhouse and the Bush in London." Public Parts shows included an adaptation of Ford Madox Ford's The Good Soldier, and The Marvelous Boy, about the poet Thomas Chatterton. As an actor, Crouch also performed in a number of plays for the Franklin Stage Company, New York, and the National Theatre, London, where he was an Education Associate.

== Plays for adults ==
=== My Arm ===
My Arm
- Written by: Tim Crouch

Premiere
- Date: 31 July 2003
- Place: Traverse Theatre, Edinburgh
- Directed by: Tim Crouch and Karl James (with Hettie Macdonald)
- Official website

Crouch wrote his first play, My Arm, as a reaction to his increasing frustration with contemporary theatre, in particular "its adherence to notions of psychological and figurative realism and its apparent neglect of the audience in its processes." He told The Scotsman, "I gave myself two years to try to make a piece of work, never having written anything before, and over a course of five days in 2002 I wrote My Arm. I wrote it almost without thinking. Looking back on it, I can see I was writing about all the frustrations I had been experiencing."

My Arm tells the story of a boy who, out of sheer bloody-mindedness, puts his arm in the air and keeps it there for thirty years. In the process, he becomes a celebrated medical specimen and an icon of the New York art scene. In his introduction to the published play, Crouch wrote, 'The boy's action is more meaningful to others than to himself. His arm becomes the ultimate inanimate object onto which others project their own symbols and meanings.'

This theme of projecting meaning is reflected in the staging. Crouch invites audience members to lend personal possessions, such as keys, jewelry, mobile phones, and photos, which are then cast as "actors", shown on a live video feed. Professor Stephen Bottoms describes the effect of this: "The lack of physical resemblance between the presented objects and the things they are made to represent creates a sense of humorous incongruity, but also allows the audience to bring in personal associations of their own. I recall, in one performance, being strangely moved by seeing a pencil case and a can of body spray bullying the Action Man doll which always stands in as the young 'Tim'. Precisely by not showing us what the bullies 'really' looked like, or having actors 'emote' their aggression, Crouch allowed me to fill in my own responsive associations with the scene described."

My Arm, co-directed by Crouch, Karl James and Hettie McDonald, opened to universal acclaim at the Traverse Theatre as part of the Edinburgh Festival in 2003. It was later adapted for BBC Radio 3, winning a 2006 Prix Italia for Best Adaptation in the Radio Drama category.

Crouch has described My Arm as "the mothership" of his later plays, which all reference it in some way. He told Catherine Love that his 2014 play, Adler and Gibb, was "a very much bigger and more complex version of My Arm."

=== An Oak Tree ===
An Oak Tree
- Written by: Tim Crouch
- Characters: The Hypnotist; Father

Premiere
- Date: 5 August 2005
- Place: Traverse Theatre, Edinburgh
- Directed by: Tim Crouch, Karl James and a smith
- Official website

The themes of My Arm, of projection and transformation, were developed in Crouch's second play, An Oak Tree. This takes its name from Michael Craig-Martin's 1973 work An Oak Tree in which the artist asks us to suppose that a glass of water has become a tree. Crouch's play shows us an encounter between a stage hypnotist and a grieving father, Andy, whose daughter has been run over and killed by the hypnotist. The father, who believes that he has transformed a tree into his dead daughter, comes to see the hypnotist hoping that he can provide some answers.

While the hypnotist is played by Crouch, the father is always played by a different actor, male or female, old or young. This second actor, who knows nothing about the play before going on stage, is guided through the performance by Crouch using spoken instructions and pages of script. The play was co-directed by Crouch's long-time collaborators, Karl James, and Andy Smith, the poet and performance artist known as "a smith", who Crouch originally asked to play the father. Smith suggested, "Why don't you get a different actor to play the father each time?"

An Oak Tree opened at the Traverse Theatre, in the 2005 Edinburgh Festival, where it had a sell-out run and won a Herald Angel award. International tours followed, including a three-month run at the Barrow Theatre in New York, where it won a special citation OBIE award. To date, over 400 actors have appeared as the father in the play, including Mike Myers, Christopher Eccleston, Frances McDormand, F. Murray Abraham, James Wilby, Laurie Anderson, Toby Jones, Mark Ravenhill, Geoffrey Rush, Tracy-Ann Oberman, David Morrissey, Saskia Reeves, Hugh Bonneville, Peter Gallagher, Juliet Aubrey, Paterson Joseph, Janet McTeer, Alan Cumming, Alanis Morissette, Samuel West, Samuel Barnett, Patrick Marber, David Threlfall, Jessie Buckley, Eddie Marsan, Russell Tovey, David Tennant and Ruth Wilson.

In 2005, Crouch described his own experience of performing with a different actor each time: "Every single father has been as different as every person is different ... Maybe some have acted too much and some have not acted at all. At times, they've each done exactly what I thought I didn't want them to do. But, in so doing, they are each and every one a revelation. They have done the play in their own way. It will never be exactly how I want it - and thank God for that."

Lyn Gardner reviewed a performance in which the father was played by Sophie Okonedo: "Watching her, never for a moment do you forget that she is a woman, and Crouch cannily ensures with his stream of stage directions that you never can forget that she is an actor. Nonetheless, as the evening wears on, neither do you doubt that she is a middle-aged man. She looks the same, but she is different."

In 2015, on the play's tenth anniversary, Crouch revived An Oak Tree for a June–July run at the National Theatre, London, followed by a return to the Traverse Theatre, as part of the Edinburgh Fringe Festival.

In 2019, The Independent included An Oak Tree in its list of "The 40 best plays to read before you die".

=== ENGLAND ===
ENGLAND
- Written by: Tim Crouch

Premiere
- Date: 4 August 2007
- Place: Fruitmarket Gallery, Edinburgh
- Directed by: Karl James and a smith.
- Official website

In Crouch's next play, ENGLAND, he performed with Hannah Ringham, co-founder of the London Shunt theatre collective. Like My Arm, ENGLAND deals with the world of contemporary art, and was written to be staged in white-walled art galleries. As guides, Crouch and Ringham welcome the audience into the gallery, leading them around the exhibition. In the first half, they share a duologue in which they play a character of undisclosed gender, whose boyfriend is a wealthy art dealer and who is in desperate need of a heart transplant. The play uses ambient sound, designed by Dan Jones, to convey the rhythm of the failing heart. In the second half, the character travels to an unnamed Middle Eastern country to thank the widow of the heart donor with a gift of a valuable painting. The widow, who believes that her husband has been murdered for his heart, is not grateful.

Crouch describes the play as "the story of one thing placed inside another: a heart inside another person's body, a culture inside another country's culture, theatre inside a gallery, a character inside an actor, a play inside its audience." Lyn Gardner saw it as "an endlessly thoughtful piece which artfully challenges a globalised world where everything is for sale, and questions the value we put on art and on human life." In August 2007, the play opened at the Fruitmarket Gallery, Edinburgh, where it won a Total Theatre award, a Fringe First and a Herald Archangel. Since then, ENGLAND has been performed in galleries across the UK and USA and also visited Oslo, Lisbon, Quebec, Madrid, Dublin, Wiesbaden, Melbourne, Singapore, Vancouver, Hong Kong, Budapest and Tehran.

=== The Author ===
The Author
- Written by: Tim Crouch
- Setting: Jerwood Theatre Upstairs, Royal Court, London

Premiere
- Date: 23 September 2009
- Place: Jerwood Theatre Upstairs, Royal Court, London
- Directed by: Karl James and a smith.
- Official website

Crouch's fourth adult play, The Author, was commissioned by the Royal Court Theatre, London, and first performed there in 2009. In the 1990s, the Court had become known for what the critic Aleks Sierz has named In-yer-face theatre, featuring depictions of extreme violence. This made it the perfect setting for an examination of the effects of creating and watching representations of violence. Crouch explained his intentions in an article: "The Author is a play about what it is to be a spectator and about our responsibilities as spectators. It explores the connection between what we see and what we do. I feel strongly that we have lost a thread of responsibility for what we choose to look at."

In the play, Crouch plays "Tim Crouch", an in-yer-face playwright who has written an abusive play, which has a destructive effect on everyone involved in it, from the author to the actors and audience. Crouch removed the stage, placing the audience on two banks of seats facing each other, where they watch each other watching the play. Four actors were placed among the audience, telling the story of the abusive play. The original cast had Vic Llewllyn and Esther Smith as the actors, and Adrian Howells as the audience member. When The Author transferred to the Traverse for the Edinburgh Festival, Adrian Howells' role was taken by Chris Goode. In 2011, the play, with the same cast, was performed in the Kirk Douglas Theatre in Los Angeles.

The Author divided critics and audiences, and there were many walk-outs. The play itself invited this reaction, including a staged walk-out early on in the action.

Writing in the Guardian in 2011, Crouch described the varied responses audiences gave the play, in Britain and in the USA: "This is a play during which audience members have read newspapers and novels, built paper aeroplanes, performed Mexican waves, sung happy birthday to one of their own, recited poetry, slow hand-clapped, physically threatened actors, hummed out loud with their fingers in their ears, muttered obscenities, shouted actors down, and thrown copies of the text at the playwright. This is a play where 10% of the audience has been known to leave during a performance – each walkout a mini drama in the unfolding narrative of the event. This is a play where the absence of applause at the end has sometimes felt like a blessing and sometimes like eternal damnation. This is a play during which an audience member once passed out; the actors insisted again and again it was not part of the performance, but everyone in the space assumed it was – including the ushers."

=== what happens to the hope at the end of the evening ===
what happens to the hope at the end of the evening
- Written by: Tim Crouch
- Setting: Almeida Theatre, London

Premiere
- Date: 15 July 2013
- Directed by: Karl James

In 2013, the London Almeida Theatre commissioned what happens to the hope at the end of the evening, written and performed by Crouch and Andy Smith (a smith) and directed by Karl James. The play tells the story of an uncomfortable Saturday night reunion between two friends who have grown apart. Their opposition is reflected in their contrasting performance styles. While smith sits at a lectern, reading the script, acknowledging the presence of the audience, Crouch attempts to create a realistic play, with a fourth wall, even bringing his own set on stage.

Describing the play to Exeunt magazine, Crouch said, "Andy sits at the side of the stage and introduces himself and ostensibly he tells his own story. And playing opposite that is a fictionalized, identifiable other character, who kind of inhabits the other sort of form, the other sort of world. He's a character who attempts to make sense of the world by being physically present in it rather than sitting at the side of it and watching it – by being physically present in a world that he is working very hard to generate on this stage. The push and the pull is between those two worlds ... My character is active – politically active, sexually active, physically active. Andy's character in this play is inactive or reflective."

Simon Holton reviewed the play for A Younger Theatre: "One of the central concerns of the piece is absence and presence, the space of the theatre and the simple act of being together in that space — what it means, and what it can do. The message of hope rings out loud and clear without ever being preachy or dogmatic. Wonderful, original, powerful theatre"

Crouch and smith took the play to Edinburgh, where it ran at the Drill Hall Studio for the Forest Fringe, from 18-24 August 2013. Joyce McMillan reviewed the play in The Scotsman: "As the friend – in a terrific performance from Crouch – rages and sulks and drinks and becomes increasingly, aggressively nervous of the gang of local kids hanging around outside, it gradually becomes apparent – in this brilliant piece of collaborative writing by two master makers – that the dysfunction is not all on one side.

"Andy, in his chair, constantly avoids his friend's gaze, preferring to address the audience about the theoretical value of theatre in bringing people together. He has succumbed to what sounds like a suffocating domesticity with his Norwegian wife and little daughter, constantly asking his friend to remove his shoes (we all remove our shoes) and not to smoke in the house. There's something vital about male middle age here, something about north and south, something about the smugness of contentment, and the activist value of honest misery. And something about theatre, too, if only because at the end of 70 minutes, the two are still there, still talking, still in the same space, as they might not have been if Tim and Andy hadn't decided to make a show about them."

=== Adler and Gibb ===
Adler & Gibb
- Written by: Tim Crouch

Premiere
- Date: 13 June 2013
- Place: Jerwood Theatre Upstairs, Royal Court, London
- Directed by: Tim Crouch, Karl James and a smith.
- Official website

Crouch's next play, Adler and Gibb, premiered at the Royal Court Theatre on 19 June 2014. Describing it in a promotional video for the Royal Court, Crouch said, "The story of this play operates on lots of different levels. There's a roller coaster modern-day story about two young people arriving at a derelict house in the middle of nowhere. Classic Scooby-Doo terrain really. And there's a huge amount of backstory around a couple of conceptual artists from New York in the 80s and 90s. At the end of the century, they leave New York and they take up residence in this house, and then ten years after that these young people arrive. So there are elements of a thriller, I suppose, but there are lots of ideas as well around appropriation and authenticity and legacy, and the drive that we have to own anything and everything and everyone."

The play, co-directed again by Crouch, James and Smith, saw their most ambitious formal experiments to date. The acting style changed throughout the play, which began with abstraction, as the actors faced front, saying their lines without gestures, accents or actions. They then moved through more dimensional performances to full realism in the second half. Crouch described this as "a tide of realism, this play – it begins low tide and it goes full high tide, in story and form." Naturalism was further undercut by the presence of two children on stage, building an earth barrow and introducing absurd props. Crouch explained, "It's a pricking of that absurd structure that we've built around us in terms of representation: kids are just so free from that. The child actor – a child, pretending to be another child – is kind of stupid. There are these things that disturb naturalism, like animals, like children, like guns, like nudity: as soon as Ian McKellen gets his wanger out in King Lear, King Lear stops for a bit."

The play was deliberately challenging to audiences. Beccy Smith recorded one audience reaction in her Total Theatre review: "I don't want to have to work this hard", complains one man behind me during the interval, "I come here to be entertained!" Michael Billington in The Guardian described it as "a show that defies storytelling convention: the fact is that, for much of the first half, we don't understand what is going on." He concluded, "I found myself growing into the piece, while feeling that the playfully experimental form dominated the intriguing content."

Andrzej Lukowski in Time Out wrote, "The lunatic has been given the keys to the asylum: with his new work 'Adler & Gibb', mischievous metatheatrical theatre maker Tim Crouch comes in from the outer edges to stage a first work on the Royal Court's storied main stage. The step up in scale isn't stumble-free. But at its best, this hilarious, harrowing and maddening interrogation of the value of art explodes with fearless intent and piercing intelligence".

The most enthusiastic review came from the independent critic, Matt Trueman, who wrote, "It's gripping: a full-throttle, partners-in-crime road movie of sorts, splashed with Tarantino-esque swagger and post-Kerouac cool ... Adler and Gibb is enormous ... It encompasses a whole load of things – and those things feel absolutely current. Crouch is grappling – really grappling – with what it means to exist now, in 2014, with our virtual reality, surrounded by signs and simulacra, with the past regurgitated as reference and retro. Where is truth in all this? Where does art stop and reality begin? Where is life?"

At the Royal Court, the cast comprised Amelda Brown (Gibb), Brian Ferguson (Sam), Denise Gough (Louise) and Rachel Redford (the Student). A simplified production played at Summerhall during the Edinburgh Festival in 2016, and then went to the Unicorn Theatre London and, in 2017, to the Kirk Douglas Theatre Los Angeles. The cast comprised Gina Moxley (Gibb), Cath Whitefield (Louise), Mark Edel-Hunt (Sam) and Jillian Pullara (the student). Crouch took over the role of Sam for the Los Angeles production. Charles McNulty in the LA Times described the play as "a kind of avant-garde-by-numbers production that leaves out what has distinguished Crouch's work in the past — the bold interrogation of the audience's role in the theatrical event".

=== Total Immediate Collective Imminent Terrestrial Salvation ===
Total Immediate Collective Imminent Terrestrial Salvation
- Written by: Tim Crouch

Premiere
- Date: 7 August 2019
- Place: Edinburgh Festival Theatre
- Directed by: Andy Smith and Karl James

Crouch's 2019 play, Total Immediate Collective Imminent Terrestrial Salvation, premiered at that year's Edinburgh International Festival followed by a run at the Royal Court, Teatro de Bairro Alto, Lisbon, and the Attenborough Centre for Creative Arts (ACCA), Brighton. It was co-directed by Andy Smith and Karl James, and used a book illustrated by Rachana Jadav. Alex Wood described the play in WhatsOnStage: "We sit, a two row-deep circle, while ornate green hard-backed books containing the script are given out. The show begins, actors appear and the audience is invited to read along and contribute, turning pages in tandem, tackling Tim Crouch's lines and taking on roles as and when required. It's a Bible studies class – the text is revered, poured over (sic). The loosely sketched story, about the final hour of a South American apocalypse-anticipating cult and its leader Miles, is an initial entry point for Crouch's new metatheatrical merrymaking show. It's a neat comparison – watching theatre is, after all, a cult-like experience; a story has to exist with a parish of punters. We watch various members of the audience stand up and join the actors, the plot gradually coming into focus....There are some striking similarities with previous Crouch work – especially An Oak Tree, which also used the loss of a family member to interrogate what it means to perform and the various, eccentric ways that grief can manifest itself. But this piece feels less emotionally intimate and more playfully communal – you can almost sense Crouch's joy at having members of the public entering his space." Mark Fisher in the Guardian, wrote, "The conceit, in this formally adventurous show, is that the Bible-like book in our hands, captivatingly illustrated in pencil sketches by Rachana Jadhav, is the same book determining the actions of Sol, a young girl brought up in a closed community after some environmental disaster. Played with openness and heart by Shyvonne Ahmmad, she has been indoctrinated to believe nothing will happen unless it has been set down in these pages. It’s a deterministic view but, as the book contains the script of the show, it is also the correct one. For as long as the performance takes place, we are not in control of what happens. Not even when the audience takes turns to play the parts of Sol and her estranged mother Anna, played primarily by Susan Vidler with similar guilelessness."

=== Truth’s a Dog Must to Kennel ===
Truth’s a Dog Must to Kennel
- Written by: Tim Crouch

Premiere
- Date: August 2022
- Place: Lyceum Studio Theatre, Edinburgh Fringe Festival
- Directed by: Karl James and a smith
- Official website

In 2022, Crouch wrote and performed a new one-person play about the Fool in King Lear. As in England, the play is based on "the idea of one thing inside something else." For much of Truth's a Dog must to Kennel Crouch, playing the fool, wears a virtual reality headset, a portal to action taking place in a grander theatre, where a production of Shakespeare's play is taking place. The fool witnesses and describes the play that he has left. Crouch told Mark Fisher of The Scotsman that he was making connections between the fool's early departure from King Lear, and the fate of theatre during the Covid pandemic: "This is about leaving....It's about the last two-and-a-half years, wondering what we're doing, how we carry on, how we re-engage, how difficult everything is, where is theatre in all of this and the invasion of the digital. This play celebrates the fact that we are all together – and that in each one of us sits an alternative one of us." In another interview, he said, "I use King Lear as a kind of holding text for an idea of theatre that I worry about and that I think about. And I use the idea of the fool as someone who is in that world and then disappears from that world."

Crouch first performed the play in August 2022 at the Royal Lyceum Theatre Edinburgh, as part of the fringe festival. David Kettle described it as "a pretty uncompromising, hopeless piece in many ways: Crouch points to parallels between Lear’s fractured world and our own many and varied contemporary problems, and even casts himself forward to future anthropologists who might wonder why people once gathered in rooms together, like we all have, to watch other people pretend to be yet other people....It generates an immense cumulative power, raising profound questions while refusing to offer easy answers." In The Scotsman, Joyce McMillan wrote, "There is something brilliant, haunting and tragic about Crouch’s suggestion that what is left of theatre has itself become a site of struggle; between those who still fully believe in shared human experience as we once knew it, and those who suspect that those times may be ending, to be replaced by forms of digital connection that offer both more, and much, much less." Deborah Chu in The Observer, wrote, "All the action is taking place behind Crouch’s VR headset, which he relays to us with moving aplomb. But the scope of his uncanny vision expands out into the audience too, until the theatre becomes a microcosm for the world at large, full of tiered inequality and minor cruelties dressed up as politesse." In a 5 star review subtitled 'Exit, mind blown', Hugh Simpson described the play as "an exquisitely prescient piece that apparently denies the very point of creativity, a hymn to humanity that insists that humanity has had it. To call it thought-provoking would be a criminal understatement." The play won a Fringe First award from The Scotsman.

Truth's a Dog Must to Kennel was co-directed by Karl James and Andy Smith, with sound design and music from Pippa Murphy and lighting by Laura Hawkins.

== Plays for children and young people ==
Alongside his adult theatre, Crouch has written several plays for young audiences and plays to be performed by young actors. In 2018, he told Theatre Weekly, "Children are experiencing theatre all the time. In their homes, their playgrounds, their schools. The organization of narrative and imaginative play is as important to a child's game as it is to a playwright. Children are natural dramatists in their play. They structure and create character. I think It's vital that a child sees their process repeated back to them by the adults – and with the formal validation of the broader culture. To understand that adults also engage in imaginative play and story-telling."

=== Shopping for Shoes ===
Crouch's first children's play was Shopping for Shoes, commissioned in 2003 by The Education Department of the National Theatre. The play is a romantic comedy exploring the power of the logo and how hard it is to resist. Siobhan McCluskey, a politically aware 13-year-old vegetarian, has a crush on fellow pupil, Shaun Holmes, who only cares about his Nike Air Jordans. They are brought together following a chance encounter with some dog dirt and a trip to a bowling alley. Crouch performs the piece using a platform tilted towards the audience, on which he places pairs of shoes representing the characters. "The shoes are never animated like conventional puppets, but each is given time, space and sometimes sound to assert itself." So Siobhan's dad, Keith, is represented by "Terrible sandals and jaunty whistling." Shopping For Shoes was first performed at St Ursula's School, Greenwich, on 18 June 2003. It then toured schools across the UK, winning the 2007 Arts Council Brian Way Award.

=== Fairy, Monster, Ghost ===
For Brighton Festival, Crouch has written three monologues: I, Caliban (2003), I, Peaseblossom (2004) and I, Banquo (2005), later performed together as the Fairy, Monster, Ghost trilogy. The plays introduce Shakespeare's plays to young audiences by retelling the stories from the viewpoints of minor characters.

In I, Caliban, Crouch is the monster from The Tempest, left alone on the island after all the characters have departed, with one last bottle of wine, and still missing his mum. Caliban introduces himself to the audience: "You're thinking, what an ugly man...Well, YOU'D BE UGLY IF YOU HAD A LIFE LIKE MINE." In I, Peaseblossom, he is the innocent child fairy from A Midsummer Night's Dream, a character who only gets one line in Shakespeare's play. I, Banquo is a darker play, for teenagers, narrated by the murdered best friend of Macbeth. Crouch appears on stage, "accompanied by a heavy-metal-guitar-playing 13 year old Fleance, a severed head and 32 litres of blood."

=== Kasper the Wild ===
In 2006, Crouch was commissioned by the Playhouse (a scheme run by Plymouth Theatre Royal, York Theatre Royal and Polka Theatre) to write a play to be performed by primary school children. Kaspar the Wild, inspired by Kaspar Hauser, is a story about the mystery wild boy, found wandering wearing scruffy clothes and trainers, who joins Year Six classmates in a sleepy village school. The play, performed by children in chorus, is written in verse: "What do we do with a boy so deprived/ Who refuses to learn or to grow or to thrive?/ WHAT DO WE DO?/ We send him to school, that's what we do."

One girl performer, interviewed for the trailer for a 2011 production in Plymouth, said, "The play is cool because the narrators say things like 'What do you think?' And most plays they tell you what to think. Plus it rhymes, which is really cool."

=== I, Malvolio ===
I, Malvolio
- Written by: Tim Crouch
- Based on: Twelfth Night by William Shakespeare
- Characters: Malvolio
- Series: I, Shakespeare

Premiere
- Date: 5 May 2010
- Place: Dorothy Stringer High School, Brighton
- Directed by: Karl James and a Smith
- Official website

Crouch's fourth Shakespeare adaptation, I, Malvolio, was also written for teenagers, a co-commission by Brighton Festival and Singapore Arts Festival, where it was shown in 2010. It went on to have a huge success with adult audiences at the Traverse in the 2011 Edinburgh Festival. Like Crouch's previous play, The Author, I, Malvolio is a play about what it is to be a spectator and about our responsibilities as spectators. In a performance close to standup comedy, Crouch appears as the pompous, theatre-despising, puritan steward from Twelfth Night, following his humiliation at the end of that play. Wearing stained long-johns and crumpled yellow stockings, he berates the audience: "Look at you. Sitting there with your bellies full of pop and pickled herring. Laughing at me. Go on. Laugh at the funny man. Laugh. Make the funny man cry." His response to the audience's laughter is a recurring cry of "You find that kind of thing funny?"

Joyce McMillan, reviewing I, Malvolio in the Scotsman, wrote, "There's never anything less than fully adult about this searing deconstruction of the conflict between Malvolio and – well, who? Not only the other characters, it seems, but us, the audience of relentless good-time boys and girls, laughing at Malvolio's humiliation, mocking the brief hope of love he enjoys."

=== John, Antonio and Nancy ===
John, Antonio and Nancy is a 2010 play for three young teen actors, commissioned by the Royal Court Theatre as part of Rough Cuts. The play was directed by Maria Aberg and performed by Couch's son, Joey, Ella Campbell and Kieran Mulligan. It premiered at Theatre Local, Elephant & Castle, and also played the Nightingale Theatre, Brighton, as part of Brighton Fringe 2011. The performers, wearing red, blue and yellow ties, play John Brown, Antonio Clegg, and Nancy Cameron, the children of the three party leaders in the 2010 UK election. In the play, Crouch deconstructs the language used in the televised debates by placing quotations from the leaders in the mouths of their children. So Gordon Brown's "'Only last week, I met a widow in Portsmouth' becomes, in the mouth of his son, 'Only last week, my father met a widow in Portsmouth'". The cumulative effect of the statements is comic, "highlighting the absurdity of 'media friendly' language."

=== I, Cinna (The Poet) ===
I Cinna (The Poet)
- Written by: Tim Crouch

Premiere
- Date: 13 June 2012
- Place: Swan Theatre, Stratford-upon-Avon
- Directed by: Tim Crouch

Tim Crouch at the Unicorn Theatre London, following a performance of I Cinna (The Poet) in February 2020

As part of the 2012 World Shakespeare Festival, the Royal Shakespeare Company commissioned Crouch to write and direct a companion piece to Gregory Doran's production of Julius Caesar. In I, Cinna (The Poet), Jude Owusu played Cinna, the poet killed by the mob after being mistaken for a conspirator in Shakespeare's play. In Crouch's play, Cinna asks his young audience to "consider the relationship between words and actions, art and politics, self and society. During the performance he asks us to write alongside him: a small poem on a big theme."

In a 2020 revival, directed by Naomi Wirthner at the Unicorn Theatre London, Crouch played Cinna. Interviewed by Catherine Greenwood, he talked about how the play had taken on new meanings since the first run: "2012 was the year after the riots in London so there was a connection to that in the original production. But the riots feel piecemeal, small scale, compared to what's happening globally now. And the idea of a country being led by a dictator who's manipulating language – welcome to the world!...Words at the moment are really complex, slippery, things politically. In 2012, we were infants in that world, and now we're horrified teenagers going, Can words really have that effect? People can lie, using the right words, they lie and everyone just accepts them. And that is also in Shakespeare's Julius Caesar; Mark Antony turns the whole course of history with his use of language."

In her review in The Stage, Sally Hales wrote that "Crouch weaves a rich tapestry of meaning that encompasses revolution, republicanism, democracy, the power of the written word, freedom and personal responsibility in a digital age....Lily Arnold's set is backed by a large swathe of crumpled paper on to which Will Monks' violent video imagery of riots flash up during startling moments accompanied by Owen Crouch's soundscape, bursting from near-silence into pulsating, insistent beats. This, along with Crouch's enthralling storytelling, combines to give the show a relentless sense of urgency."

Melinda Haunton, on the View from the Cheap Seat site, wrote, "It's a tribute to how successful this show is as creative inspiration that a sticky press night audience of adults and critics scribbled without stopping." Eve Allin, in Exeunt magazine, responded to Crouch's poetic challenge by writing her review of the show "in sonnets and haikus and couplets."

=== Beginners ===
Beginners
- Written by: Tim Crouch

Premiere
- Date: 28 March 2018
- Place: Unicorn Theatre, London
- Directed by: Tim Crouch
- Official website

In 2018, Crouch wrote Beginners, a play performed by and for children and adults. It "tells the story of three families trapped in a waterlogged holiday cottage over summer. The children are bored. The adults are down the pub. So far so normal." Crouch told the Evening Standard, "I wrote it because my children have grown up. I love the adults they've become but I miss the children they were. I sometimes think I see the children that they were in the adults they've become and that makes me inordinately happy and also inconsolably sad."

The play, directed by Crouch, was first performed at London's Unicorn Theatre in March 2018. The cast comprised five adult actors (Pandora Colin, Rob Das, Jacqui Dubois, Neil D'Souza and Amalia Vitale) playing the children, their parents, and a dog. The children were also embodied by four young actors, with roles shared by Atinuke Akinrinade, Ethan Dattani, Nekisha Eric, Rowan Davies-Moore, Archie MacGregor, Ella Scott, Emilija Trajkovic, and Milan Verma. Beginners was designed by Chloe Lamford and Camilla Clarke with music by Nick Powell.

Miriam Gillinson, in Time Out, described the play as "a properly grown-up piece of children's theatre that reaches across the generations... Crouch likes to tease his audience... test our senses and generally mess with our heads. The real thrill here is that Crouch applies these exact same methods to his family show and pulls it off brilliantly....The stage is gradually given over to the four talented young actors...Their hopes and dreams fill the space... and we realise these are really our hopes and dreams, only fresher and freer." Maddy Costa, in Exeunt, described Beginners as "complex and nuanced, slippery and sly, frequently hilarious, densely poetic, often bewildering to my children, but pleasingly a challenge to their powers of deduction." Lyn Gardner, in The Guardian, wrote that the play "operates like a mischievous yet emotionally textured murder mystery, but one without a body. It investigates instead how childhood gets killed....The pleasure in Crouch's increasingly funny play is in the way that...he gradually enlarges the metaphysical and physical space. Watching it – and the play within the play that the children stage – we expand our belief in what's possible and how we can overcome what life throws at us." However, The Evening Standard critic, Fiona Mountford, "constantly struggled to work out whether the characters we were watching were adults or children."

=== Superglue ===
Superglue
- Written by: Tim Crouch

Premiere
- Date: 24 February 2022
- Place: Young People's Theatre, Newcastle
- Directed by: Mark Buckley
- Official website

In 2022, Crouch's wrote Superglue for the National Theatre Connections youth theatre festival. The play reversed the structure of Beginners, with child actors now playing adults, who were embodied by the presence of elderly people. According to the National Theatre listing, "Superglue tells the story of a group of climate activists gathering at a woodland burial ground to say goodbye to a friend who died during a protest. As they gather, they erect banners and they talk about their pasts and their futures, about peaceful action versus violent action, about how society dismisses them and undervalues their cause. Initially, we believe these activists are the age of the actors playing them. Gradually, we realise that this is the story of an elderly climate action group - elderly characters performed without imitation by young actors. Parallels are drawn between old age and adolescence in a play that gently invites an intergenerational understanding of the future of our planet."

The play was first performed in February 2022 at the Young Peoples' Theatre in Newcastle. A second production by Croydon Youth Theatre was staged at Southwark Playhouse in April.

=== Toto Kerblammo! ===
Toto Kerblammo!
- Written by: Tim Crouch

Premiere
- Date: 6 October 2024
- Place: Unicorn Theatre, London
- Directed by: Tim Crouch

In 2024, Crouch returned to an idea he had initially sketched out for the company Visible Fictions in Scotland 20 years before: a play delivered to the audience through headphones combining binaural recording and live action. Toto Kerblammo! tells the story of Effy, a 12 year old girl struggling with her mental health, and her dog Toto. Effy’s mother, unable to care for her daughter, has been placed in a secure hospital and Effy is sent to live with her aunt and uncle in a block of flats that forbid pets. Effy smuggles Toto in but, when he is discovered, they run away into the night and both she and Toto are hit by a car. In their unconscious state, they can talk to each other. They talk about hope and selflessness and love and the need to listen. Toto narrates for the audience at moments. And Effy’s mother sends voice recordings to help her daughter come round. As Effy gradually regains consciousness in hospital, Toto’s life slowly fades away by the road where he was hit. But his lessons have been leant. Effy’s situation is redeemed by her dog and also by the presence of a boy, Noah, who is 'as different to Toto as a boy is to a dog, but has exactly the same spirit. (And is played by exactly the same actor.)’ Noah’s loyalty and love bring Effy to a place of hope at the end - despite the ultimate loss of her dog.

In 2023 the Unicorn Theatre commissioned Crouch to return to his original idea, finish the script and direct it. For the production, which ran from 6 October to 3 November 2024, the creative team included regular Crouch collaborator Lily Arnold (Designer), Will Monks (Lighting design) and the sound designer Helen Skiera with whom Crouch had work on The Author (2009) and Adler & Gibb (2014). Effy was played by Peyvand Sadeghian. Toto/Noah were played by Felipe Pacheco. The voice of the Mother was recorded by Sinead Matthews.

In its four star review, The Guardian described the sound design as being used ‘to both playful and profound effect’ and said that the audience ‘leave the theatre with sharpened senses’. The Stage, in a five star review, concluded that ‘what resonates most is a deep sense of mystery surrounding the workings of the human mind and, above all, the heart.’ London’s Time Out described the play as ‘an exquisite portrait of childhood woundedness and emotional inarticulacy.’ In its five star review, North West End wrote: 'The concept is clever and the execution brilliant, but the true genius of this play is its heart. Tim Crouch affords his characters the space to be genuinely intelligent, complex and tender. It is affirming to see – to hear – and is the driving argument for the love and care this play demands we show to ourselves. We are all struggling, we are all complicated, and yet we are all worthy. Messaging which is vital for adults and children alike.’

Crouch was nominated for the 2024 Offie for Best Writer for Young Audiences and Helen Skiera received one for Best Sound Design for Young Audiences.

== Television ==
=== Don't Forget the Driver ===
In 2019, Crouch collaborated with Toby Jones, writing Don't Forget the Driver, a six-part comedy series for the BBC. Set in Bognor Regis, the series tells "the story of coach driver and single dad Peter Green (Jones). His is a life of ordinary routine; clip on ties, limp packed lunches, vehicle checks, round-trip coach journeys ferrying church groups to donkey sanctuaries and Japanese tourists to Canterbury Cathedral." Crouch described the series as "a love-song to Bognor. It's where I come from and it's a lot of who I am...The series is about a moment when a seemingly small life interacts with the wider world. Bognor sits on the edge of England - facing out towards Europe. I've known it since the sixties and it's changed with the times. A migrant population has enriched its culture...The modern world has arrived and yet Bognor still has the unmistakeable air of a seaside town holding onto its traditional values. It's like two rivers joining - a sometimes mis-remembered past and an unknown future. Bognor has become a good place to explore many of the themes of national identity that are gripping our country."

== Collaborations ==
As an experimental theatre maker, Crouch enjoys collaborating with other companies and art forms. May is a 2011 collaboration between Crouch and the Probe dance company, performed by the dancers Antonia Gove and Ben Duke with music by Scott Smith. Crouch provided text about May, a beautiful girl who self-harms, and Gregory, her shy boyfriend. Jake Orr reviewed the piece: "The overall effect is of a tenderness that meets and crashes into chaos. Crouch's dialogue is unhinged by the characters' inability to express themselves, which then gets explored through dance."

In 2012, Crouch was invited by the Dutch theatre company Kassys to collaborate, along with the Nature Theatre of Oklahoma] and Nicole Beutler in Cadavre Exquis, a project inspired by the Surrealist parlour game, Exquisite Corpse. A Cadavre Exquis is a poem (or a drawing) written by several poets, without knowing what the others have written. "The first writer writes a line of poetry on a piece of paper. Then he folds the paper in such a way that only the last word is visible. The second writer continues." The rules set out for the theatre project were that "Each director makes a part that is maximum 15 minutes. As a starting point each director only sees the last 60 seconds of the previous part. Each director brings in one performer." Crouch, who brought Hannah Ringham, from ENGLAND, as his performer, wrote, "Cadavre Exquis magnifies the process of the here and now. It throws us into the arms of a response, which feels like the most productive way to work. The project also elevates its audience by not being in full control of itself. By quartering the traditional unity of intent, the theatre makers become as associative as the audience."

== Influence ==
Crouch's plays have been translated into many other languages, and there have been productions of them in Italy, France, Portugal, Poland, Czech Republic, Germany, Brazil, Canada, Australia, the US and South Korea. The plays are set texts in schools and drama colleges, and a new generation of "Crouchian" experimental theatre makers is emerging. Little Bulb and Made in China are two companies who have cited Crouch as an influence. Chris Goode and A Smith, who have both worked with Crouch, and Michael Pinchbeck also explore similar areas of metatheatre.

== Directing ==
Crouch also works as on occasional director. For the Royal Shakespeare Company, in Stratford, he has directed productions of The Taming of the Shrew, in 2011, King Lear and his own play I, Cinna (the Poet), both in 2012. In February 2016, he directed Gary Owen's play for children, Jeramee, Hartleby and Ooglemore, at the Unicorn Theatre, London.

In 2016, Crouch adapted and directed The Complete Deaths by Spymonkey, in which all 75 onstage deaths in Shakespeare's plays were performed. After previews at the Royal & Derngate in Northampton, The Complete Deaths premiered in May at the Theatre Royal Brighton as part of the Brighton Festival. Reviewing the show in The Stage, Natasha Tripney wrote, "The pairing of Spymonkey with director Tim Crouch turns out to be inspired. The show contains moments of physical brilliance but also some equally entertaining repurposing of live art tropes....The best moments are when it manages to feel both like a Spymonkey show and a Tim Crouch production at the same time, a bloody marriage of slapstick and something more probing about the staging of death: the extinguishing of life and light. But it never entirely removes its tongue from its cheek; the production's main aim is to make its audience laugh, which it does, often. We laugh with them at death."

In 2026, Crouch directed The Tempest, for the Sam Wanamaker playhouse at the Globe. He played Prospero, in a "trippy production" which didn't "so much break the fourth wall as utterly obliterate it, with mind-bending results."

== Dramatugy of Liberating Constrictions ==
In an interview to Duška Radosavljević, Tim Crouch has spoken about the significance of "liberating constrictions" for his creative process:

"If you have a good restriction, it is really easy: I have to make a play that will contain an actor who doesn't know the play, and suddenly ideas start flooding about devices and models of imparting character."

== Unease ==
One of the recurring features of Crouch's work is the creation of uneasy moments for the audience. At one point in My Arm, the narrator, describing his earliest memory of an exercise in will power, says, "For that moment, we have to go to the great silence of 1973." Crouch follows this by holding a "silence far longer than is bearable". Similarly, at one point in An Oak Tree, Crouch leaves the second actor alone on stage for an uncomfortable length of time. Unease is taken to extremes in The Author, where audience members are given the freedom to walk out. In 2005, Crouch told the Herald Scotland, "Unease is not an emotion I get often in the theatre and I like it. I'd rather have that visceral response to something than just sit through a piece of theatre that's been made by people who are making theatre."

== Published plays ==
- My Arm (including I, Caliban and Shopping for Shoes), Faber & Faber, 2003
- An Oak Tree, Oberon Books, 2005
- ENGLAND, Oberon Books, 2007
- The Author, Oberon Books, 2009
- I, Shakespeare, Oberon Books, 2011
- Tim Crouch Plays One, Oberon Books, 2011
- I Cinna (The Poet), Oberon Books, 2012
- Adler and Gibb (including what happens to the hope at the end of the evening), Oberon Books, 2014
- Beginners, Oberon Books, 2018
- Truth's a Dog Must to Kennel, Methuen, 2022
- Toto Kerblammo!, Methuen, 2024
