= Juliette Marquet =

French film producer

- Born: Paris
- Citizenship: French
- Education: La Sorbonne Nouvelle University
- Occupation: Animation producer
- Known for: Yuck!

Juliette Marquet is a French, Oscar-nominated screenwriter and producer born in Paris, France. She is mostly known for producing the award-winning animated short film Yuck! (2023), which was nominated for an Academy Award and a César Award for Best Animated Short.

== Filmography ==
=== Film ===
- 2020: Horacio (short film) - production manager. Directed by Caroline Cherrier.
- 2021: Terra Incognita (short film) - production manager. Directed by Adrian Dexter and Pernille Kjaer.
- 2021: L'Amour en plan (short film) - production manager. Directed by Claire Sichez.
- 2021: Granny's Sexual Life (short film) - production manager. Directed by Emilie Pigeard and Urska Djukić.
- 2023: Yuck! (short film) - producer. Directed by Loïc Espuche.

=== TV series ===
- 2024: Petite Casbah (6 episodes) - production manager. Directed by Antoine Colomb.
- 2024: La Rivière à l'envers (8 episodes) - production director. Directed by Paul Leluc.

== Recognition ==
With the short film Yuck! (2023), directed by Loïc Espuche, Marquet has won several awards, including the Best Animated Short Award at the 2024 Austin Film Festival, the Best Short Film for Children Award at the 2024 Brussels International Animation Film Festival, and the 2024 Benshi Children's Award at the Annecy International Animation Film Festival.

On January 23, 2025, Marquet received her first Academy Award nomination for Yuck! (2023) in the Best Animated Short Film category. The film also received a nomination to the 50th César Awards in the Best Short Animation category.
