= Helen FitzGerald =

Australian writer (born 1966)

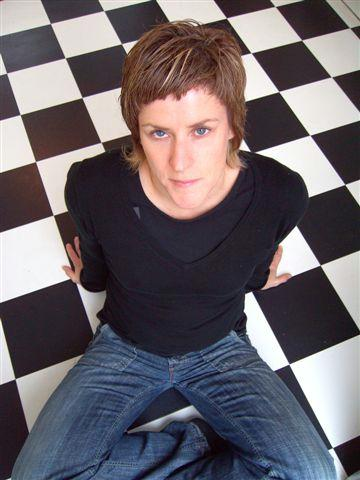
- Helen FitzGerald
- Born: 1966 (age 59–60)
- Occupations: Novelist; screenwriter
- Writing career
- Language: English
- Years active: 2007–present

Helen FitzGerald (born 1966) is an Australian novelist and screenwriter. Her debut novel, Dead Lovely, was published by Allen & Unwin in 2007, and The Exit in 2015 by Faber & Faber. Viral was released in 2016.

== Background ==
She was raised in the country town of Kilmore, Victoria; the twelfth in a family of thirteen children. She studied English and History at the University of Melbourne, before later attending Glasgow University where she completed a Diploma and Masters in Social Work. She began writing while working as a criminal justice social worker, where for a period she worked with serious sex offenders in Glasgow's Barlinnie Prison. She quit this job for a time to focus solely on her writing career, before returning to the field part-time. She cites her experience as a social worker an inspiration in the subject matter of her writing.

== Writing ==
FitzGerald began as a screenwriter, writing scripts for a series of educational children's dramas for BBC Scotland. However, she became frustrated with the industry when none of her subsequent screenplays were produced, and she turned to novel-writing. She states that the rules of screenwriting are very stringent, but that in having learned them she has improved as a writer.

Her books are mostly thrillers, though she herself has described her genre as "Domestic Noir", a term coined by her fellow author Julia Crouch.

== Works ==
FitzGerald has written sixteen novels to date:

- Dead Lovely, published 2007
- The Devil's Staircase, published 2009
- My Last Confession, published 2009
- Bloody Women, published 2009
- Amelia O'Donohue is SO Not a Virgin, published 2010
- The Donor, published 2011
- Hot Flush, published 2011
- The Duplicate, published 2012
- Deviant, published 2013
- The Cry, published 2013; adapted as a BBC serial (2018) starring Jenna Coleman and Ewen Leslie.
- The Exit, published 2015
- Viral, published 2016
- Worst Case Scenario, published 2019
- Ash Mountain, published 2021
- Keep Her Sweet, published 2022
- Halfway House, published 2023

Additionally, FitzGerald is the showrunner for the UK-Australia co-produced drama miniseries Careless (2026), based on her original story idea and starring Solly McLeod, Katie Leung, Robyn Malcolm and Richard Roxburgh.

== Critical reaction ==
A few critics noted that FitzGerald's first book, while generally described as a crime novel, did not follow the traditional rules of the genre. They argued that it belonged to a different, more psychologically complex tradition, characterised by the dark humour and flawed anti-heroines of writers such as Tama Janowitz and Fay Weldon.

The Cry has received the widest critical acclaim of any of FitzGerald's novels to date, with FitzGerald's friend Doug Johnstone from The Independent on Sunday stating: "Astonishingly good. It is utterly harrowing, completely plausible, constantly nerve-shredding ... It plays on the deepest, darkest fears of all parents about their children, and embeds that everyday terror in a plot so up-to-the-minute that you'll swear it's been lifted from the pages of a newspaper ... The Cry is a remarkable novel – its devastating power all the stronger for its realistic rendering. Brilliant stuff."

== Nominations ==
FitzGerald has been nominated for several awards, including:

- 2010 Davitt Award for The Devil's Staircase, shortlisted
- 2010 Spinetingler Award for The Devil's Staircase
- 2012 Davitt Award for The Donor, shortlisted
- 2014 Theakstons Old Peculier Crime Novel of the Year Award for The Cry
- 2014 Davitt Award for The Cry
- 2020 Theakstons Old Peculier Crime Novel of the Year Award, shortlisted for Worst Case Scenario
