= Jacquelin Perske =

Australian screenwriter and producer

Jacquelin Perske is an Australian screenwriter and producer who is best known as co-creator of the television series, Love My Way and for her screenplay for The Cry.

== Television adaptations ==
She wrote four of the six episodes of the 2017 drama series, Seven Types of Ambiguity, adapted from Elliot Perlman's 2003 book of the same name, and was executive producer alongside Tony Ayres.

Perske adapted Helen FitzGerald's novel, The Cry, into the four-part 2018 television series of the same name, produced for the ABC and BBC.

== Awards ==
Perske won the Film Script category at the 2005 Queensland Premier's Literary Awards with her screenplay for Little Fish.

She was awarded the Best Screenplay in Television prize for episode 2 of Seven Types of Ambiguity at the 7th AACTA Awards.

She was joint winner of the Script category at the 2020 New South Wales Premier's Literary Awards for Episode 2 of The Cry.

== Filmography ==
=== Television ===
Year	TV series/TV movie	Role	Other notes
1997	Big Sky	screenwriter	2 episodes
1997	Raw FM	screenwriter	1 episodes
2002–2003	The Secret Life of Us	screenwriter	4 episodes
2004	Fireflies	screenwriter	1 episode
2004–2006	Love My Way	co-creator, screenwriter	
2010-2011	Spirited	co-producer, screenwriter	
2015	Deadline Gallipoli	co-producer, screenwriter	1 episode
2017	Seven Types of Ambiguity	executive producer, screenwriter	4 episodes
2017	Will	screenwriter	2 episodes
2018	The New Legends of Monkey	screenwriter	6 episodes
2018	The Cry	screenwriter	4 episodes
2021	Fires	screenwriter	
2024	The Tattooist of Auschwitz	screenwriter	4 episodes

=== Film ===
Year	Film	Role	Other notes
1990	Sure Thing	screenwriter	short film
1995	Rose Are Red	screenwriter	short film
2005	Little Fish	screenwriter	
