= Irreverent =

Australian drama television miniseries

- Genre: Comedy drama; Crime fiction
- Created by: Paddy Macrae
- Written by: Paddy Macrae; Andrew Knight; Andrew Anastasios; Angela McDonald; Dan Knight; Darlene Johnson
- Directed by: Jonathan Teplitzky; Lucy Gaffy
- Starring: Colin Donnell; Kylie Bracknell; Wayne Blair
- Composer: David Hirschfelder
- Country of origin: Australia
- Original language: English
- No. of series: 1
- No. of episodes: 10

Production
- Executive producers: Debbie Lee; Paddy Macrae; Alastair Mackinnon; Andrew Knight
- Producers: Andrew Knight; Tom Hoffie
- Cinematography: Gary Phillips; Murray Lui
- Camera setup: Multi-camera
- Running time: 47 minutes
- Production company: Matchbox Pictures

Original release
- Network: Peacock; Netflix
- Release: 30 November 2022

Irreverent is an Australian drama television miniseries that was released on 30 November 2022 on Peacock in the United States and on 4 December 2022 on Netflix in Australia and New Zealand. Irreverent follows the story of an American criminal who bungles a heist and is forced to hide out in a small Australian reef town in Far North Queensland posing as the new church minister.

In April 2023, the series was cancelled after one season.

== Cast ==
- Colin Donnell as Paulo, a Chicago gangster forced to take refuge in the remote town of Clump, posing as the Reverend Mackenzie Boyd
- P. J. Byrne as Mackenzie, the reverend who was originally posted to Clump
- Kylie Bracknell as Piper, the police officer in charge of lawkeeping in Clump
- Tegan Stimson as Daisy, a troubled teenager who befriends Paulo
- Ed Oxenbould as Cameron, Daisy's best friend
- Wayne Blair as Peter, a deacon of the church in Clump
- Jason Wilder as Aidan, Piper's fiancé
- Briallen Clarke as Amy, resident of Clump
- Calen Tassone as Harry
- Russell Dykstra as Lester
- Francis Greenslade as Ron
- Roz Hammond as Margie
- Broden Kelly as Luke Jovic
- Sam Parsonson as James Jovic
- Anna Lise Phillips as Helen
- Ursula Yovich as Grace
- Andrea Szabo as Bev
- Eddie Baroo as Andy
- Robert Rabiah as Farah
- Felix Hooper as Young Mack
- Steve Mouzakis as Lorenzo
- Gerry Connolly as minister
- Helen Thomson as Antoinette
- Lasarus Ratuere as Ryan

== Episodes ==
No.	Title	Directed by	Written by	Original release date
1	"The Lord Giveth and the Lord Taketh Away"	Jonathan Teplitzky	Paddy Macrae and Dan Knight	30 November 2022
Paulo, a Chicago criminal, accidentally kills the son of a Chicago criminal family during a standoff. He grabs a bag containing $1.6m and runs for his life, boarding a plane at O'Hare Airport bound for the Gold Coast, Australia. He sits next to Mackenzie, a priest posted to the remote parish of Clump in Far North Queensland. Mackenzie is distraught that his wife has left him, and they end up drinking at the same hotel bar after arrival. Paulo passes out and Mackenzie steals the bag of cash, buys a car and lives it up on the Gold Coast. Paulo, realising his life is in danger from the crims in Chicago, heads north to Clump in a church-owned hearse with no air-conditioning to assume Mackenzie's identity. He is arrested on arrival for dangerous driving without a licence (he knocks over the town's only electricity connection) by Piper, the local and only police officer. Despite the hot, remote location with poor cell phone service, almost no internet, and a small town of eccentrics, he needs to stay and hide out. In his small church and manse, he finds Mackenzie's belongings that have been sent ahead, and a 16-year-old girl, Daisy, who had been in trouble with the law and whom he lets stay.
2	"Louts and Fishes"	Jonathan Teplitzky	Paddy Macrae, Andrew Knight, and Dan Knight	30 November 2022
The episode revolves around two incompetent brothers who are smuggling tobacco concealed in insulated shrimp containers. They let a shipment slide off the back of a boat into the water, and two boxes are later discovered by Daisy and her friend from the caravan park, Cameron. They decide to keep the rough cut tobacco, selling it to finance Daisy's escape from small-town Clump. The brothers track Daisy down, but Paulo beats them up, and reveals something of his identity to Daisy. He also steals a Holden Torana intending to drive south (a car that never reappears afterwards), because his friend Lew in Chicago has found out where Mackenzie is staying out on the Gold Coast. But Lew tells him to stay put in Clump, off the grid, since the Chicago mob are after him.
3	"Ashes to Ashes"	Jonathan Teplitzky	Paddy Macrae	30 November 2022
Mack (Paulo), cuts a deal with the brother's mum to store the tobacco at the church where nobody will think to look for it, in exchange for a regular A$5,000 commission. He wants to use the money to get a new identity. But he also has to prepare to conduct a funeral for one of Clump's most beloved figures, Victor, a bar owner and fisherman. With some coaching from Mackenzie on the phone (the two are bizarrely in touch, although Paulo wants his money back), Paulo performs the funeral.
4	"The Wisdom of Mack"	Lucy Gaffy	Paddy Macrae and Andrew Anastasios	30 November 2022
To raise attendance and avoid the church's closure, which is threatened by a visiting bishop because of declining attendance, Mack must reunite two feuding families who refuse to attend Sunday services. He does so accidentally, by quoting a story from the Bible. He is given one month to increase church attendance otherwise the church will be sold. He saves Daisy from a vindictive court judge who wants to place her in juvenile detention (juvie) for stealing painkillers. This is avoided by Mack promising to take her into harsh and disciplinary 'pastoral care'. It is revealed that she suffers undiagnosed chronic pain, and sought drugs for that.
5	"The Prodigal Wife"	Lucy Gaffy	Paddy Macrae and Angela McDonald	30 November 2022
The real reverend's wife, Charmaine, shows up in Clump. She has got wind of his stolen money, but feigns wanting to reunite. Instead she finds the imposter, Paulo/Mack. They feign being together and collude to track down the reverent and then split the money. She and Mack must also play married when the entire town is invited to Piper's birthday party. Charmaine takes off for the Gold Coast in pursuit of the reverend, and Mack/Paulo pretends to the town that she left him. Piper is in pursuit of the suspicious trade in tobacco.
6	"Serpent in the Garden"	Lucy Gaffy	Paddy Macrae and Darlene Johnson	30 November 2022
Charmaine arrives in the Gold Coast, and steals the loot while the reverend is passed out drunk. When he awakes, he is distraught, and on Paulo's advice over the phone, flees the hotel without paying an enormous bill. Paulo stops the supply of chop-chop tobacco to negotiate a better deal for the farmers. This is partially successful. Charmaine lives the high life.
7	"Lost Sheep"	Lucy Gaffy	Paddy Macrae and Darlene Johnson	30 November 2022
Daisy's friend Cam loves joyriding, and steals the church hearse. He knocks over a Harley-Davidson motor bike belonging to someone higher up in the tobacco trade. Paulo takes the rap for Cam's action, but needs to find $50k to reimburse the biker. He executes a dangerous plan to steal money from the safe at the town's only major employer, the sugar mill. He works under the cover of the town's Fun Run, while Piper is distracted from her police duties by winning. The safe is stolen since he cannot open it, then stolen again by Cam, then recovered, finally opened, and then Cam decides to give out thousands of dollars to the mill workers and town residents – meaning Paula and Daisy still owe money to the bikies. Meanwhile the Chicago mob intimidate and then kill Paulo's friend Lew, obtaining Paulo's location. They send a hitman, Farah, to Australia to kill him in revenge, and if possible to retrieve the money as well.
8	"Unholy Matrimony"	Lucy Gaffy	Paddy Macrae and Andrew Anastasios	30 November 2022
Farah arrives in the Gold Coast and tracks down Rev. Mackenzie, by this stage fallen on hard times and with no resources. He reveals the location of Paulo in Clump, and Charmaine, who has been spending heavily on the Gold Coast or Brisbane. Farah drives with both of them north toward Clump, presumably to tie up all loose ends in one manoeuvre. At a gas station, Charmaine manages to escape the car, but the Rev is handcuffed to the steering wheel. Farah catches Charmaine and locks her in the trunk, where she dies of asphyxiation or the heat. The reverend is forced to dig her grave. In an uncharacteristic move, he manages to knock out Farah with the shovel and bury him, taking off in the car to make his peace with Paulo and God, and explain his actions. Unfortunately Farah survives in his shallow grave, and makes a slow recovery, hitchhiking and stealing a truck on his way north.
9	"Double Cross"	Jonathan Teplitzky	Paddy Macrae and Andrew Anastasios	30 November 2022
A local entrepreneur, Lester, addresses a persistent theme in the series – the lack of a cell phone service. He gets the green light to mount a cell mast on one of the only locations where a signal is received – the freestanding bell tower of the church. Paulo is really worried that the arrival of a wireless signal would likely lead to the Chicago mob tracking him down more easily, and he has been taking care to stay off the grid. He is unaware that Farah is already on his way. Daisy struggles with her health and needs $10,000 to investigate endometriosis. Paulo pays off the bikers once and for all by promising them the stored chop-chop tobacco from the church. The bishop sees Paulo in action on official duties, and decides to save the church from being sold and redeveloped.
10	"The Last Breakfast"	Jonathan Teplitzky	Paddy Macrae	30 November 2022
The reverend shows up and offers the remaining cash, stolen back from Farah to Paulo, since he has now found God again. Paulo convinces him to leave town immediately, after angry words and a fight. Piper has upset her partner with her obsession with police work, and he says she must commit to him by marrying at 3 pm in the church. She shows up, there is no priest, and at the last minute, she realises Paulo is leading a double life (a sub plot concerns a corrupt senior policeman and a dangerous arrest that Paulo secretly assisted with, with Piper now convinced he is a criminal), goes back to verify this at the station, and then heads back to the church to look for him and confront him. At the same time Farah shows up in Clump and is seen approaching by a departing reverend. He takes Daisy hostage to flush out Paulo. Later, as Farah is preparing to kill Paulo and all witnesses (Paulo tries unsuccessfully to talk him out of it) the reverend drives into town, sees the holdup underneath the bell tower, loses control of his car, which crashes into the bell tower and brings down the satellite receiver. It is large and in the shape of a cross. The cross falls on Farah in the nick of time, killing him instantly. The reverend believes it was an act of God. Piper now knows that Paulo, who she fancies, has a criminal past. Piper is confused about whether to arrest anybody, and $100 bills fall from the sky: Paulo has stashed the money in the bell tower. The series ends with the head of the Chicago mob, Antoinette, learning of events and saying that she will now start 'Plan B'.

== Production ==
Irreverent was created by Paddy Macrae and written by Macrae, Andrew Knight, Andrew Anastasios, Angela McDonald, Dan Knight and Darlene Johnson. It was directed by Jonathan Teplitzky and Lucy Gaffy, executive produced by Debbie Lee, Macrae, Alastair Mackinnon and Andrew Knight, and produced by Tom Hoffie. The series was filmed in Mission Beach, Queensland.

Australian author Gerard Lee claimed his screen play Persian Blue that he had submitted in 2014 to people who later became involved in producing Irreverent, had been the unacknowledged inspiration for the TV series. The authors and production company denied this.
