= The Testaments (TV series) =

American dystopian television series

- Genre: Drama; Dystopia
- Created by: Bruce Miller
- Based on: The Testaments by Margaret Atwood
- Starring: Chase Infiniti; Lucy Halliday; Mabel Li; Brad Alexander; Isolde Ardies; Rowan Blanchard; Mattea Conforti; Zarrin Darnell-Martin; Eva Foote; Kira Guloien; Shechinah Mpumlwana; Birva Pandya; Amy Seimetz; Ann Dowd
- Composer: Adam Taylor
- Country of origin: United States
- Original language: English
- No. of seasons: 1
- No. of episodes: 10

Production
- Executive producers: Bruce Miller; Warren Littlefield; Elisabeth Moss; Steve Stark; Shana Stein; Maya Goldsmith; John Weber; Sheila Hockin; Daniel Wilson; Fran Sears; Mike Barker
- Cinematography: Greta Zozula; Marc Laliberté
- Editors: Wendy Hallam Martin; Ana Yavari
- Running time: 40–52 minutes
- Production companies: Love & Squalor Pictures; The Littlefield Company; White Oak Pictures; Toluca Pictures; MGM Television; 20th Television

Original release
- Network: Hulu
- Release: April 8, 2026 – present

Related
- The Handmaid's Tale

The Testaments is an American dystopian drama television series produced for Hulu, based on the 2019 novel The Testaments by Margaret Atwood. It serves as a narrative continuation to The Handmaid's Tale (2017–2025) created by Bruce Miller. The series premiered on April 8, 2026. In May 2026, the series was renewed for a second season. At the 78th Primetime Emmy Awards, Chase Infiniti received a nomination for the Primetime Emmy Award for Outstanding Lead Actress in a Drama Series.

== Premise ==
The series is set in the dystopian theocracy of Gilead, serving as a sequel to The Handmaid's Tale. It follows a new generation of young women, including Agnes, who has grown up entirely within Gilead, and Daisy, a newcomer from beyond its borders. Facing arranged marriages and lives of strict obedience, the series follows their coming of age under Gilead's rigid rule.

== Cast and characters ==
=== Main ===
- Chase Infiniti as Agnes MacKenzie (known as Hannah Bankole in The Handmaid's Tale), a girl at the top of the heap in Gilead and biological daughter of June Osborne, who begins to rebel against the regime's oppressive structure as she uncovers her true identity.
- Lucy Halliday as Daisy, a young Canadian teenager whose life is upended by a horrifying family secret that links her to Gilead, leading her to work as an undercover Mayday operative. As revealed in "Commitment," her real name is Marguerite and Daisy is just a nickname.
- Mabel Li as Aunt Vidala, a founding member of the Aunts and a brutal disciplinarian who strictly enforces Gilead's rules while vying for more power and security. In "Stadium," her real name is revealed to be Vivian and she is shown to have been an elementary school teacher who worked with Lydia before Gilead.
- Brad Alexander as Garth Chapin, a young Guardian working for the MacKenzie family, who secretly operates as a deep-cover agent for the resistance group Mayday as well as Daisy's handler. Garth is later promoted to Commander.
- Isolde Ardies as Hulda Marie Edwardson, a guileless and optimistic young "Plum" who is eagerly anticipating her coming-of-age and future womanhood within Gilead's traditions.
- Rowan Blanchard as Shunammite Hayes, a pampered and blunt teenager from a high-ranking family whose status grants her significant power and respect among her peers.
- Mattea Conforti as Rebecka "Becka" Grove, a student of humble origins at Aunt Lydia's academy who, unlike her peers, views her groomed future with dread and begins to question her fate. It is implied she is attracted to Agnes.
- Zarrin Darnell-Martin as Aunt Gabbana, a strict and uncompromising disciplinarian at Ardua Hall who serves as Aunt Vidala's right hand and a firm proponent of Gilead's core values.
- Eva Foote as Aunt Estee, the youngest and most compassionate Aunt at the academy, known for her kindness and "cool" reputation among students. It is later revealed that she is not originally from Gilead.
- Kira Guloien as Rosa, a dedicated Martha in the MacKenzie household who serves as a caring, maternal figure to Agnes.
- Shechinah Mpumlwana as Jehosheba Yardarm, a Plum who adheres strictly to theology.
- Birva Pandya as Miriam Dawson, a Plum who worries about her social standing.
- Amy Seimetz as Paula MacKenzie, Agnes's prickly and status-conscious stepmother, who married Commander MacKenzie following the death of his first wife and is determined to mold Agnes into a perfect, submissive wife to maintain their family's social standing.
- Ann Dowd as Aunt Lydia Clements, the headmistress of a school for elite Gilead daughters who, while outwardly a high-ranking enforcer of the regime's values, secretly works to subvert and ultimately topple the government from within. Dowd reprises the role from The Handmaid's Tale, where she was previously the administrator of the Red Center, where Handmaids are trained.

=== Guest ===
- Elisabeth Moss as June Osborne, the biological mother of Agnes (Hannah) who, while living in exile in Canada, remains a pivotal leader in the Mayday resistance and continues her mission to rescue her daughter from Gilead.
- Reed Diamond as Commander Weston, a high-ranking official who runs the Eyes, Gilead's secret police force.
- Charlie Carrick as Commander Michael Judd, a powerful, high-ranking official in Gilead with control over women's affairs who maintains a coercive, mutually beneficial alliance with Aunt Lydia to further his political ambitions.
- Sam Jaeger as Mark Tuello, a US government representative and friend of June Osborne. Tuello appears in a voice cameo as an announcer of Radio Free Boston.
- Amanda Brugel as Rita Blue, a former Martha and a friend of June's who helps Daisy to prepare for her mission.
- Margaret Atwood makes a cameo appearance as a prison matron talking to Lydia in "Secateurs."
- Stephen Colbert as an announcer of Radio Free Boston, in a voice cameo role.

== Episodes ==
No.	Title	Directed by	Written by	Original release date
1	"Precious Flowers"	Mike Barker	Television story by : Bruce Miller; Teleplay by : Bruce Miller	April 8, 2026
Four years after the War of Massachusetts, (Note: As seen in The Handmaid's Tale season 6) Agnes MacKenzie attends the Aunt Lydia School as a Plum Girl, a future wife for a Commander who has not yet hit puberty. Lydia assigns Agnes to shepherd Daisy, a Pearl Girl or missionary from outside of Gilead. Daisy becomes overwhelmed after witnessing a Guardian have his hand chopped off for masturbation as the girls yell in encouragement. At night, Daisy secretly listens to a pirate radio station and remembers her life in Toronto. In a flashback, June Osborne is a customer in Daisy's parents' store, watching the young woman.
2	"Perfect Teeth"	Mike Barker	Story by : Stuti Malhotra & Bruce Miller; Teleplay by : Stuti Malhotra	April 8, 2026
Agnes awakens one morning to find she has started her period. At school, while Agnes runs to ring the school bell to announce her entry into womanhood, Daisy goes to confess her use of blasphemous language, fearing that Agnes had gone upstairs to report her. In the meantime, Agnes is praised for reaching womanhood and is bestowed a brooch pin to celebrate this coming of age. As the girls are called to witness the punishment of Daisy, Daisy admits Agnes heard her profanity, causing them both to be disciplined by scrubbing soap in their mouths. While getting her teeth whitened, Agnes is molested by Doctor Grove, Becka's father. Elsewhere, Daisy secretly draws a map of the school and hides it in her neighbor Pearl Girl's bed, who notices her actions. That night, Agnes is baptized as a new Green Girl, joining her best friend Becka, who reveals she doesn't want this future life for herself.
3	"Daisy"	Mike Barker	Bayan Wolcott	April 8, 2026
While on a field trip, the girls are caught in the midst of a Mayday attack. Daisy remembers growing up in Canada when, suddenly, her parents, Neil and Melanie, were murdered by Gilead agents. June Osborne helps Daisy escape authorities, revealing that Daisy's parents had adopted her after Daisy was smuggled out of Gilead as a child. Skeptical, Daisy sneaks off to her boyfriend, who refuses to believe her story. Realizing that her life in Canada is over, Daisy reunites with June and joins Mayday. In the present, Daisy is revealed to be a Mayday operative who has infiltrated the school, secretly working with Garth, the MacKenzie family Guardian.
4	"Green Tea"	Quyen Tran	Elise Brown	April 15, 2026
The Green Girls put on an elaborate tea party to impress the Aunts and the Wives ahead of meeting potential future husbands at a ball. Agnes accidentally bites into a porcelain figure, necessitating another trip to Doctor Grove. After returning home, Agnes finds her shirt unfastened, revealing that Grove had sexually assaulted her while Agnes was unconscious. Daisy is approached by Candace, a desperate florist and Mayday operative who warns that the Eyes are closing in on her; Garth reveals that Gilead has been cracking down on Mayday since the bus attack. While sneaking around, Daisy is caught by Commander MacKenzie, who reveals a genuine fatherly affection for Agnes and gives Daisy a piece of chocolate from his travels. The writing on the wrapper reveals that MacKenzie has been to Japan, which is strange as Japan has sanctions against Gilead. Daisy later learns that Candace was executed as a Mayday spy, and Radio Free Boston suddenly cuts to static after an urgent warning, causing her to have a private breakdown as the pressure mounts on Daisy.
5	"Ball"	Quyen Tran	Sam Rubinek & Nate Burke	April 22, 2026
A ball is held to find potential matches for the Green Girls amongst the Commanders. After her experience with Dr. Grove, Agnes is cold and rude to Becka, who later admits to Daisy that she's in love with Agnes. Garth asks Daisy to get close to Agnes to learn more about Commander MacKenzie's activities, as Mayday suspects him of brokering an arms deal with the Japanese. The Commanders get some of the girls, including Becka, drunk, disgusting Aunt Lydia. Commander Judd suggests to Aunt Vidala that it may be time to replace Lydia. When Agnes' dance partner is called away, she dances with Garth instead, increasing her feelings for him. An excited Agnes later learns that Garth will be promoted to Commander in a few weeks, making him eligible to marry her.
6	"Stadium"	Jet Wilkinson	Gianna Sobol	April 29, 2026
In the aftermath of the Sons of Jacob coup, Lydia, Vidala, and numerous other women are held in a stadium where they are evaluated for suitability and executed if they don't meet the requirements. To ensure her own survival, Lydia proposes to Commander Judd that she be placed in charge of teaching the women of Gilead and proves her loyalty by taking part in the execution of Vidala, although the gun turns out to be unloaded. In the present, the Aunts go through the genealogy of the girls and their potential matches amidst rising tensions between Lydia and Vidala. At Agnes' request, Lydia adds Garth to the candidates. Aunt Estee reveals to Daisy that she is not originally from Gilead while Penny Judd suffers a miscarriage. Increasingly disillusioned and concerned for her ability to protect the girls, Lydia contemplates the record she began compiling after the massacre at Jezebel's and the fall of Boston of the crimes committed by Gilead's elite, enough damning information to bring down the men who rule the country.
7	"Commitment"	Jet Wilkinson	Maya Goldsmith	May 6, 2026
In a flashback, Daisy is taken to Rita Blue, whom Daisy convinces to allow her to go undercover in Gilead for Mayday. While helping Daisy to prepare, Rita tells her about June's daughter in Gilead. Living on the streets, Daisy gets herself recruited by the Pearl Girls and is taken to Gilead. In the present, Gilead's attempt to invade Boston has been repelled. Daisy spends time with Agnes and tells her about the world outside of Gilead. Daisy's radio is found, and the Pearl Girls are interrogated by Commander Seth Weston about possible involvement in the bus attack. Eventually, one of the other girls, Talia, is dragged off kicking and screaming. At night, Daisy prays for Talia. The Green Girls interview with their prospective Commanders, with Garth ending up matched with Becka instead of Agnes. Commander Weston, the head of the Eyes, expresses an interest in Agnes, much to her discomfort, while Paula pushes for a match between them; a Mayday dossier reveals that Weston has a history of domestic violence. Agnes displays increasingly rebellious behavior and shares a charged moment with Garth, where he assures Agnes that he sees the real her.
8	"Broken"	Shana Stein	Stuti Malhotra	May 13, 2026
Amidst nightmares surrounding her sexual assault by Dr. Grove, Agnes is engaged to Commander Weston, while Garth and Becka are engaged. It's revealed that Garth's father was the Commander who led the fight to keep Boston in the War of Massachusetts and was left in a wheelchair by a Mayday assassination attempt while Shunamite's brother was one of the children from Angel's Flight. (Note: As seen in The Handmaid's Tale season 3) Daisy becomes concerned after getting her period which puts her in greater danger while Shunamite is devastated by the idea that she might be infertile. At Agnes' encouragement, Hulda reveals to Vidala that Grove sexually assaulted her, but Vidala covers it up. Agnes later tells Lydia and Daisy about her assault. Lydia cautions Agnes to bide her time, but she is unaware that Lydia is subtly telling her that Grove will be dealt with, while it's implied that Daisy is going to do something reckless.
9	"Marat Sade"	Shana Stein	Bayan Wolcott & Ben Miller	May 20, 2026
Daisy reveals that she's had her period, and, as a result, she becomes a Plum. When Daisy is taken to Dr. Grove, she fakes being sexually assaulted by him, exposing his crimes despite Vidala's attempts to cover it up. Estee begs for forgiveness for failing to protect the girls while Lydia makes it clear that she knows Daisy lied, but is pleased with the chance to bring Grove to justice. Commander Judd agrees to have Grove executed once Becka is married to protect her, but Lydia is visibly disturbed by Judd's blase attitude towards Grove's actions while Garth is angry about Daisy risking her cover. After Agnes finally tells her the truth, Becka murders her father in the bathtub and goes to Agnes for help. Instead, Commander MacKenzie calls the Eyes who drag Becka away over Agnes' protests as a conflicted Garth watches.
10	"Secateurs"	Mike Barker	Bruce Miller & Maya Goldsmith & Gianna Sobol	May 27, 2026
In the aftermath of Becka's arrest, Agnes and Daisy attempt to save her. After a sharp reality check from Agnes, Vidala offers Lydia her help rather than standing against her. Agnes gets Weston to release Becka to her home, but he breaks off their engagement upon learning that she was assaulted. A drunk Paula tells Agnes that Gilead had wanted to use her to retaliate for the Handmaid attack, but Commander MacKenzie protected Agnes. June arrives in Gilead to extract a reluctant Daisy, but relents upon learning that Daisy knows her daughter. Lydia and Vidala convince Becka's mother to take the fall while Daisy reveals to Agnes her true identity as Hannah. Agnes later finds a drawing that she signed with her real name (Note: As seen in The Handmaid's Tale season 5 episode "Allegiance"), and Lydia confirms it. Mrs. Grove is executed while Garth is promoted to Commander and marries Becka to protect her at Agnes' behest. June receives a message from Daisy vowing to finish what June started by rallying the girls of Gilead to fight back. Agnes, Daisy, and Shunamite walk through school together with their pinkies interlocked in a show of unity.

== Production ==
=== Development ===
In March 2023, Bruce Miller stepped down as showrunner of The Handmaid's Tale to focus on adapting The Testaments for television. In February 2025, The Testaments was nearing a series greenlight. Miller would executive produce alongside fellow Handmaid's Tale executive producer Warren Littlefield of The Littlefield Company, with MGM Television as the studio. In March 2025, it was announced that Mike Barker would direct the first three episodes and also executive produce the series.

In April 2025, Hulu officially ordered The Testaments to series. The Handmaid's Tale lead Elisabeth Moss would executive produce the project alongside Miller, Littlefield, Barker, Steve Stark, Shana Stein, Maya Goldsmith, John Weber, Sheila Hockin, Daniel Wilson, and Fran Sears. Priscilla Poriand would serve as co-executive producer. In May 2026, Hulu renewed the series for a second season.

=== Casting ===
In February 2025, Chase Infiniti was cast as the lead character Agnes, joining The Handmaid's Tale's Ann Dowd, who was expected to reprise her role as Lydia. In March 2025, it was announced that Lucy Halliday joined the series as co-lead Daisy. The same month, it was announced that Rowan Blanchard and Mattea Conforti joined the cast as Shunammite and Becka, respectively. In April 2025, it was announced that Mabel Li, Amy Seimetz, Brad Alexander, Zarrin Darnell-Martin, Eva Foote, Isolde Ardies, Shechinah Mpumlwana, Birva Pandya, and Kira Guloien joined the cast as Aunt Vidala, Paula, Garth, Aunt Gabbana, Aunt Estee, Hulda, Jehosheba, Miriam, and Rosa, respectively.

=== Filming ===
Principal photography on the series began on April 7, 2025, and wrapped on August 15.

== Release ==
The Testaments premiered with the first three episodes on Hulu on April 8, 2026.

== Reception ==
=== Critical response ===
On the review aggregator website Rotten Tomatoes, the series holds an 88% approval rating, based on 57 critic reviews, with an average rating of 7.1/10. The website's critics consensus reads: "The Testaments ably continues The Handmaid's Tale's fight through a coming-of-age lens in a slow-burning world builder that features an excellent cast of fresh talent." Metacritic, which uses a weighted average, assigned a score of 71 out of 100, based on 22 critics, indicating "generally favorable" reviews.

=== Accolades ===
Year	Award	Category	Nominee(s)	Result	Ref.
2026	Astra TV Awards	Best Book to Screen Series	The Testaments	Nominated	
2026	Astra TV Awards	Best Actress in a Drama Series	Chase Infiniti	Nominated	
2026	Astra TV Awards	Best Guest Actress in a Drama Series	Elisabeth Moss	Nominated	
2026	Astra TV Awards	Best Writing in a Drama Series	The Testaments	Nominated	
2026	Black Reel TV Awards	Outstanding Lead Performance in a Drama Series	Chase Infiniti	Nominated	
2026	Gotham TV Awards	Outstanding Lead Performance in a Drama Series	Chase Infiniti	Won	
2026	Humanitas Prize	Drama Teleplay	Gianna Sobol (for "Stadium")	Nominated	
2026	Primetime Emmy Awards	Outstanding Lead Actress in a Drama Series	Chase Infiniti	Nominated	
