= The Ollie & Moon Show =

- Also known as: Ollie & Moon
- Genre: Fantasy; Slapstick
- Created by: Diane Kredensor
- Based on: Ollie & Moon series by Diane Kredensor
- Developed by: Diane Kredensor and Robert Vargas
- Directed by: Florian Thouret
- Voices of: Kobi Frumer; Brian Beckerle; Liam Patenaude; Mattea Conforti; Rosalie Turmel; Ofosu Jones-Quartey; Don Shepherd
- Theme music composer: Benoit Rault; Phillippe DeShales; Lionel Flairs
- Opening theme: The Ollie and Moon Theme Song
- Ending theme: The Ollie and Moon Theme Song (Instrumental)
- Composer: Nobert Gilbert
- Countries of origin: Canada; France; United States
- Original languages: English; French
- No. of seasons: 2
- No. of episodes: 78

Production
- Executive producer: Diane Kredensor
- Producers: David Michel; Zoé Z. Carrera Allaix; Cécile Lauritano
- Running time: 11 minutes
- Production companies: Cottonwood Media; Kaibou Studio IX; TTK Montréal

Original release
- Network: France 4, France 5 and Okoo (France); TVOKids (Canada); Universal Kids / Netflix / HBO Max (USA); Tiny Pop (2019-2023) / CBeebies / TBA (UK)
- Release: May 27, 2017 – 2021

The Ollie & Moon Show (also known as Ollie & Moon) is an animated children's television series developed by Diane Kredensor and Robert Vargas, and directed by Florian Thouret. The series is a Canadian-French-American co-production between Cottonwood Media, Kaibou Studio IX, and TTK Montréal. It is based on the Ollie & Moon book series by Diane Kredensor. The series debuted on Sprout in the United States on May 27, 2017, and was carried over when the channel became Universal Kids months later until 2021. The show was also available on Netflix and HBO Max. The series was picked up from a pilot project contest on BiteTV. Season 2 started production in 2018, and premiered on France 4 on June 15, 2020.

== Plot ==
The Ollie & Moon Show is about two six-year-old cats Ollie and Moon, along with their travel buddy Stanley the snail, who travel around the world and learn about different cultures. The show features animated characters in realistic backgrounds.

== Characters ==
- Ollie (voiced by Kobi Frumer and Brian Beckerle in season 1 and Liam Patenaude in season 2) is a very methodical Abyssinian cat who loves to plan.
- Moon (voiced by Mattea Conforti in season 1 and Rosalie Turmel in season 2) is an extremely impulsive tabby cat who loves to adventure.
- Stanley (voiced by Ofosu Jones-Quartey - Ian Jones-Quartey's older brother - in season 1 and Don Shepherd in season 2) is a blue snail who is Ollie and Moon's travel companion.

== Episodes ==
=== Pilot (2012) ===
Title	Original release date
"The Ollie & Moon Show"	May 16, 2012
When it's too hot, Ollie and Moon go on an expedition to get gelato.

=== Season 1 (2017-18) ===
No. overall	No. in season	Title	Written by	Storyboard by	Original release date	US viewers (millions)
1	1	"Tiptoe Through the Tulips" "Stanley's Piñata Party"	John May; Suzanne Bolch	Florian Thouret Aleksandar Dzoni	May 27, 2017	N/A
Tiptoe Through the Tulips: While looking for tulips in the Netherlands, Ollie and Moon lose their friend Scoot's GPS and must learn to tell the truth. Stanley's Piñata Party: Ollie and Moon travel to Mexico to get Stanley a piñata for his birthday, and end up accidentally buying an unbreakable one.
2	2	"You Mermaid My Day" "Hawaiian Shirt Hijinks"	Jill Cozza-Turner Nathalie Reznikoff; Séverine Vuillaume	Phuong Mai Nguyen Aleksandar Dzoni	May 28, 2017	N/A
You Mermaid My Day: After reading a book about a mermaid, Moon and her friends head to Denmark to find such a creature. Hawaiian Shirt Hijinks: Ollie accidentally stains his Hawaiian shirt, and therefore goes to the archipelago state to get a replacement.
3	3	"The Italian Meatball Marathon" "The Japanese Comic Trip"	John May; Suzanne Bolch Shelley Hoffman; Robert Pincombe	Aleksandar Dzoni Adrien Gault	May 29, 2017	N/A
4	4	"A Polish Soup Solution" "A Sweet Time in Scotland"	John May; Suzanne Bolch Scott Cameron; Diane Kredensor	Loïc Espuche Aleksandar Dzoni	May 29, 2017	N/A
A Polish Soup Solution': Stanley has a cold, and directs the two cats to Poland where the snail has a relative who specializes in making a soup remedy. A Sweet Time in Scotland: Moon gets carried away and gobbles up Ollie's Scottish honey. To make up for her act, Moon takes Ollie, who is still asleep, to Scotland where they can obtain the kind of nectar.
5	5	"The Daring Duo" "Loose Tooth in London"	John May; Suzanne Bolch	Loïc Espuche Phuong Mai Nguyen	May 29, 2017	N/A
6	6	"The Lost Spanish Pajamas" "The Lion Whisperer"	Robin J. Stein; John May; Suzanne Bolch John May; Suzanne Bolch	Adrien Gault Aleksandar Dzoni	May 29, 2017	N/A
The Lost Spanish Pajamas: Ollie brings his favorite pajamas to Spain. His luggage containing the garment accidentally gets switched with a similar luggage own by someone else. The Lion Whisperer: Ollie's bouncy ball ends up on their apartment roof as a result of Moon's careless playing. The cats fly to Africa to find someone enormously tall to reach it.
7	7	"Chillin' in the Desert" "Goin' Coconuts"	John May; Suzanne Bolch Scott Cameron; Diane Kredensor	Christian Ragoust Phuong Mai Nguyen	June 3, 2017	N/A
8	8	"Tall Tale in India" "The Case of the Missing Russian Bear"	Jill Cozza-Turner Nathalie Reznikoff; Séverine Vulliaume	Jéremie Guneau Loïc Espuche	June 10, 2017	N/A
9	9	"The Chinese Cookie Caper" "Italian Gelato Twist"	John May; Suzanne Bolch Robert Vargas; Diane Kredensor; Suzanne Bolch; John May	Phoung Mai Nguyen Jérémie Guneau	June 24, 2017	N/A
10	10	"The Chopsticks Jam in Japan" "Quest for the Irish Clover"	John May; Suzanne Bolch Sylvie Barro; Kathryn Walton-Ward	Aleksander Dzoni Loïc Espuche	June 24, 2017	N/A
11	11	"Canadian Pancake Party" "Swiss Mountain Rescue Cats"	Shelley Hoffman; Robert Pincombe Sylvie Barro; Maud Loisilllier	Jérémie Guneau	June 23, 2017	N/A
12a	12a	"The Australian Kangaroo Race"	Sylvie Barro; Maud Loisilllier	Phuong Mai Nguyen	September 9, 2017	N/A
12b	12b	"Goosebumps in Greenland"	François Boublil; Henry Steiman	Aleksander Dzoni	September 10, 2017	N/A
13a	13a	"Chef Moon Takes on Paris"	Nathalie Reznikoff; Séverine Vulliaume	Jéremie Guneau	September 10, 2017	N/A
13b	13b	"Ollie's Night with Thailand Lights"	Cyril Deydier	Jérémie Guneau	September 23, 2017	N/A
14a	14a	"Moon's Greek Cookie Craving"	Sylvie Barro; Kathryn Walton-Ward	Aleksander Dzoni	September 23, 2017	N/A
14b	14b	"Drawing Lessons in Peru"	Diane Kredensor; Scott Cameron	Aleksander Dzoni	June 25, 2017	N/A
15a	15a	"The Grand Canyon Cover-up"	Sylvie Barro; Kathryn Walton-Ward	Théophile Gibaud	September 24, 2017	N/A
15b	15b	"Moon's Magic Wand"	Eddy Fluchon; Christophe Patris	Sebastien Hary	September 25, 2017	N/A
Wanting to prove that magic really exists, Moon drags Ollie all the way to Merlin's cave in England.
16a	16a	"The Amazing French Race"	Shelley Hoffman; Robert Pincombe	Phoung Mai Nguyen	September 26, 2017	N/A
Moon challenges Dolly and Zoom to a tandem bike rice in France, but Ollie is certain that everything is about to go wrong.
16b	16b	"The Malaysian Butterfly Chase"	Nathalie Reznikoff; Séverine Vulliaume	Laura Muller	October 11, 2017	N/A
While searching for a rare butterfly in Malaysia, Ollie's and Moon's different personalities both cause -- and solve -- problems.
17a	17a	"A Chinese Scavenger Hunt"	Sylvie Barro; Maud Loisillier	Loïc Espuche	January 3, 2018	N/A
17b	17b	"Ollie's Yellowstone Park Plan"	Nathalie Reznikoff; Séverine Vulliaume	Sebastien Hary	January 1, 2018	N/A
18a	18a	"A Wild Goose Chase in Berlin"	Cyril Deydier	Aleksandar Dzoni	January 5, 2018	N/A
18b	18b	"Stanley's Family Reunion"	Nathalie Reznikoff; Séverine Vulliaume	Jing Wang	January 8, 2018	N/A
19a	19a	"Easter Island Art Adventure"	François Boublil; Henry Steiman	Laura Muller	January 9, 2018	N/A
19b	19b	"Finding the Rhythm in Cuba"	Cyril Deydier	Sebastien Hary	January 8, 2018	N/A
20a	20a	"A Tree Grows in Sweden"	Sylvie Barro; Maud Loisillier	Johanna Huck	January 10, 2018	N/A
20b	20b	"The Giant Cats of Borneo"	Cyril Deydier	Aleksandar Dzoni	January 16, 2018	N/A
21a	21a	"The New Zealand Knit-Off"	Eddy Fluchon	Théophile Gibaud	January 11, 2018	N/A
21b	21b	"Catnap in Iceland"	Sylvie Barro; Kathryn Walton-Ward	Sebastien Hary	January 17, 2018	N/A
22a	22a	"New York Party Animals"	Alexa Dosne	Jérémie Guneau	January 19, 2018	N/A
22b	22b	"The Russian Doll Disaster"	Sylvie Barro; Kathryn Walton-Ward	Théophile Gibaud	January 12, 2018	N/A
23a	23a	"A Tasty Trip to Vietnam"	Sylvie Barro; Maud Loisillier	Johanna Huck	January 18, 2018	N/A
23b	23b	"The Egyptian Expedition"	Eddy Fluchon	Sebastien Hary	2018	TBD
24a	24a	"Thinking Pink in Senegal"	Sylvie Barro; Kathryn Walton-Ward	Aleksandar Dzoni	2018	TBD
24b	24b	"A Surprise in South Africa"	Sylvie Barro; Kathryn Walton-Ward	Aleksandar Dzoni	2018	TBD
25a	25a	"The Bolivian Hat Hunt"	Eddy Fluchon	Phuong Mai Nguyen	2018	TBD
25b	25b	"The Slowest Sloth in Costa Rica"	Shelley Hoffman; Robert Pincombe	Aleksandar Dzoni	2018	TBD
26a	26a	"Brazilian Carnival Cats"	Nathalie Reznikoff; Séverine Vuillaume	Jérémie Guneau	2018	TBD
26b	26b	"Brazilian Soccer School"	John May; Suzanne Bolch	Adrien Gault	2018	TBD

=== Season 2 (2020-21) ===
No. overall	No. in season	Title	Written by	Storyboard by	Original release date
27a	1a	"Manhattan Lemonade Showdown"	TBD	TBA	2020
27b	1b	"Camping with Catlock in Canada"	TBD	TBA	2020
28a	2a	"Venice Show Stopper"	TBA	TBA	TBA
28b	2b	"Egyptian History Mystery"	TBA	TBA	TBA
29b	3a	"Game Time in Tokyo"	TBA	TBA	TBA
29b	3b	"Pet Sitting in Paris"	TBA	TBA	TBA
30a	4a	"Germany Takes the Cake"	TBA	TBA	TBA
30b	4b	"Fearless in Fiji"	TBA	TBA	TBA
TBA	"Cool Cats in China"	TBA			
TBA	"Ollie's Mongolian Move"	TBA			
TBA	"The Spanish Giant"	TBA			
TBA	"Moon's Moroccan Hat Dance"	TBA			
TBA	"Rip Snorter in Australia"	TBA			
TBA	"Rockin' Cats in Finland"	TBA			
TBA	"Bendier in India"	TBA			
TBA	"Amazon River Adventure"	TBA			
TBA	"The Korean Cracker Challenge"	TBA			
TBA	"Japanese Bunny Bop"	TBA			
TBA	"Talent Trouble in London"	TBA			
TBA	"Guatemalan Kite Contest"	TBA			
37a	11a	"Makeover in Milan"	TBA	TBA	TBA
37b	11b	"Friendship Day in Switzerland"	TBA	TBA	TBA
38a	12a	"Lotta Likes South Africa"	TBA	TBA	TBA
38b	12b	"Treasure Hunt in Jordan"	TBA	TBA	TBA
39a	13a	"Super Ollie in Nicaragua"	TBA	TBA	TBA
39b	13b	"Picky Parrots in Poland"	TBD	TBA	2021

== Broadcast ==
The Ollie & Moon Show debuted on Universal Kids (as Sprout) in the United States on May 27, 2017. The series aired on Knowledge Network and TVOKids in Canada. In Latin America, it airs on Discovery Kids, in Quebec it airs on TFO, and in Finland it airs on TV 2. In the UK, the series aired on Tiny Pop. and premiered on CBeebies and BBC iPlayer on TBA. The series used to be available for streaming Netflix and HBO Max in the United States. Season 2 was released on HBO Max in 2021 instead of being aired on Universal Kids. The series was removed from HBO Max in August 2022, due to licensing issues and as a part of a tax write-off for Warner Bros. Discovery, and was removed from Netflix due to the licensing expiring for the show

Storyboard for the teaser of The Ollie & Moon Mini Show, which is scheduled to be released in 2027 and has been announced by Cottonwood Media, has been found on March 24, 2026 by a user on YouTube.
