= Mabel Li =

Australian actress

Mabel Li is an Australian actress.

== Early life and education ==
Mabel Li is Chinese Australian. She trained at the National Institute of Dramatic Art (NIDA) in Sydney.

== Career ==
Li's first role after graduating was a young teacher in The Tailings.

For her performance in New Gold Mountain, she was nominated for the 2022 Logie Award Most Outstanding Supporting Actress. She played Zhang Lei, a wealthy, powerful immigrant.

She played lawyer Jenny Lee in the 2023 SBS drama Safe Home, and as Pieta in Erotic Stories.

She joined the cast for The Handmaid's Tale follow-up series The Testaments, and Bay of Fires series 2.

On 29 January 2026, Li was named in the cast of Stan Australia co-commissioned series Careless.

== Filmography ==
| Year | Title | Role | Notes |
|---|---|---|---|
| 2026 | Careless | Hannah Garton | TV series |
| 2026 | The Testaments | Aunt Vidala | TV series |
| 2025 | Bay of Fires | Cynthia Alice | TV series |
| 2025 | He Had It Coming | Jenny | TV series |
| 2023 | Erotic Stories | Pieta | 1 episode (Masc Up) |
| 2023 | Safe Home | Jenny Lee | 4 episodes |
| 2022 | Meet the Changs | Melanie | 10 episodes |
| 2022 | Voice Activated | Penny | Short |
| 2021 | New Gold Mountain | Zhang Lei | 4 episodes |
| 2021 | The Tailings | Ruby | 6 episodes |

== Theatre ==
Li has appeared in numerous theatre projects from Delilah by the Hour to Never Closer for Belvoir Theatre. In 2023, Li appeared in the Sydney Theatre Company's run of The Seagull.

| Year | Title | Role | Notes | Ref |
|---|---|---|---|---|
| 2024 | Never Closer | Niamh | Belvoir | |
| 2024 | Cost of Living | Jess | Melbourne Theatre Co. | |
| 2023 | The Seagull | Nina | Sydney Theatre Co. | |
| 2023 | Miss Peony | Sabrina | Belvoir | |
| 2020 | Delilah by the Hour | Performer | | |

== Accolades ==
| Year | Award | Category | Nominee | Result | Ref |
|---|---|---|---|---|---|
| 2024 | Logie Awards | Best Supporting Actress | Safe Home | Nominated | |
| 2022 | Asian Academy Creative Awards | Best Actress in a Supporting Role | New Gold Mountain | Won | |
| 2022 | Logie Awards | Most Outstanding Supporting Actress | New Gold Mountain | Nominated | |
