= Tegan Stimson =

Australian actress

- Born: South Africa
- Occupation: Actress

Tegan Stimson is a South African born Australian actress. Tegan Stimson trained at the Cooper Screen Academy and her first screen role was play Jas, a young student investigating the death of her father in The Tailings. This was followed up with the Netflix drama comedy series Irreverent where she played Daisy, a girl who befriends the towns new Reverend. She then went on to play Ry, a victim of domestic abuse in Safe Home.

== Filmography ==
Television Appearances
Year	Title	Role	Notes
2023	Safe Home	Ry	TV Series; 4 episodes
2022	Irreverent	Daisy	TV Series; 10 episodes
2021	The Tailings	Jas	TV Series; 6 episodes
