= Mattea Conforti =

American actress (born 2006)

- Born: Mattea Marie Conforti; May 22, 2006 (age 20); West Caldwell, New Jersey, U.S.
- Occupation: Actress
- Years active: 2015–present
- Notable work: Frozen; Frozen 2

Mattea Marie Conforti (born May 22, 2006) is an American actress. She made her debut as a replacement for the titular character in Matilda the Musical in 2015. On Broadway, she originated the role of Young Anna in Frozen and played Louise in the 2017 revival of Sunday in the Park with George. Conforti has starred in television shows such as Power, NOS4A2, and The Testaments. Additionally, she voiced Young Elsa in Frozen 2 and the titular character of Moon in The Ollie & Moon Show.

== Life and career ==
=== 2006–2017: Early life and career beginnings ===
Conforti was born in 2006 in New Jersey to Nicole and Damian Conforti. She spent the first decade of her life in West Caldwell. She's an alum of Mountain Lakes High School, where she was captain of the cheerleading and lacrosse teams.

Conforti first appeared onscreen at age seven in a Charmin commercial. At a young age, Conforti bought tickets to see Matilda the Musical with her grandmother. Conforti felt a "tinge of disappointment" since she could "easily see herself [starring as the lead character]" and "[she] could have done that".

In September 2014, at the age of eight, Conforti attended an open casting call for Matilda the Musical. Two months later, Conforti received a callback and was cast as a replacement for the titular character. She learnt to speak with a British accent and performed from June 2015 to May 2016. In the same year, Conforti made her film debut playing a minor role in 3 Generations.

In 2017, Conforti played the role of Louise in the 2017 revival of Sunday in the Park with George. Conforti voiced the titular character of Moon in The Ollie & Moon Show. Conforti originated the role of young Anna in Frozen, the stage adaptation of the 2013 film of the same name, first in a pre-Broadway tryout in Denver, then on Broadway in March 2018. Reception for the show was generally positive, and Conforti's performance was praised. For example, The Washington Post wrote that she and Ayla Schwartz, who portrayed young Elsa, were "exceptionally cast", while BBC News wrote that she was "super-perky" She left the cast during November 2018.

Conforti played the titular character in The Muny's Matilda the Musical. She received mostly favourable reviews. Tanya Seale of BroadwayWorld called her "the delightful earworm" and Mark Bretz of Ladue News called her "dazzling". Conforti voiced young Elsa in Frozen II. She played Millie Manx in NOS4A2. The series was cancelled after its second season.

=== 2021–present: Current work ===
In 2021, Conforti portrayed the younger version of the character Janice Soprano in the film The Many Saints of Newark.

While still in high school Conforti directed a short film, Retrospect, part of the 2023 Brooklyn Film Festival.

In Fall of 2024, Conforti enrolled in Harvard University. She is studying theater, dance, and media with a minor in government. She is a member of Harvard's Hasty Pudding Theatricals, where she played the role of "Al Dente" in the troupe's 176th production 101 Damnations.

In March 2025 she was cast as series regular, on The Testaments. When she booked the series, she found out she had a week to get to Canada and start filming. Conforti took a leave of absence during her freshman year to film Season One from March to August 2025.

On The Testaments she plays "Becka", a girl of humble origins who attends school with Gilead’s elite. As she comes of age, she starts to question whether she wants the life she's being groomed for. Season one reviews called Conforti "a standout" as Agnes’ best friend Becka.

== Stage ==
Year	Production	Role	Venue	Date	Notes
2015	Matilda the Musical	Matilda Wormwood (replacement)	Shubert Theatre	July 7, 2015 – May 8, 2016	
2017	Sunday in the Park with George	Louise	Hudson Theatre	February 23, 2017 – April 23, 2017	
2017	Frozen	Young Anna	Buell Theatre	August 17, 2017 – October 1, 2017	Pre-Broadway Tryout
2018	Frozen	Young Anna	St. James Theatre	March 22, 2018 – November 11, 2018	
2019	Matilda the Musical	Matilda Wormwood	The Muny	August 5, 2019 – August 11, 2019	
2025	101 Damnations	Al Dente	Farkas Hall	February 5, 2025 - March 9, 2025	World Premiere

== Filmography ==
=== Film ===
Year	Title	Role	Notes
2015	3 Generations	Mia	Credited as Mattea Marie Conforti
2017	The Super	Rose	Credited as Mattea Marie Conforti
2018	Viper Club	Kayla	
2019	Frozen 2	Young Elsa	Voice
2021	The Many Saints of Newark	Young Janice Soprano	

=== Television ===
Year	Title	Role	Notes
2016	Gotham	Little Girl	Episode: "New Day Rising"
2017–present	The Ollie & Moon Show	Moon	Lead role
2017–2020	Power	Elisa Marie Proctor	Recurring
2018	The Good Cop	Young Niece	Episode: "Who Framed the Good Cop?"
2019–2020	NOS4A2	Millicent "Millie" Manx	Recurring (season 1); main (season 2)
2022	The Calling	Olivia Conte	Recurring
2026	The Testaments	Becka	Series regular
