= Aisha Dee =

Australian actress and singer (born 1993)

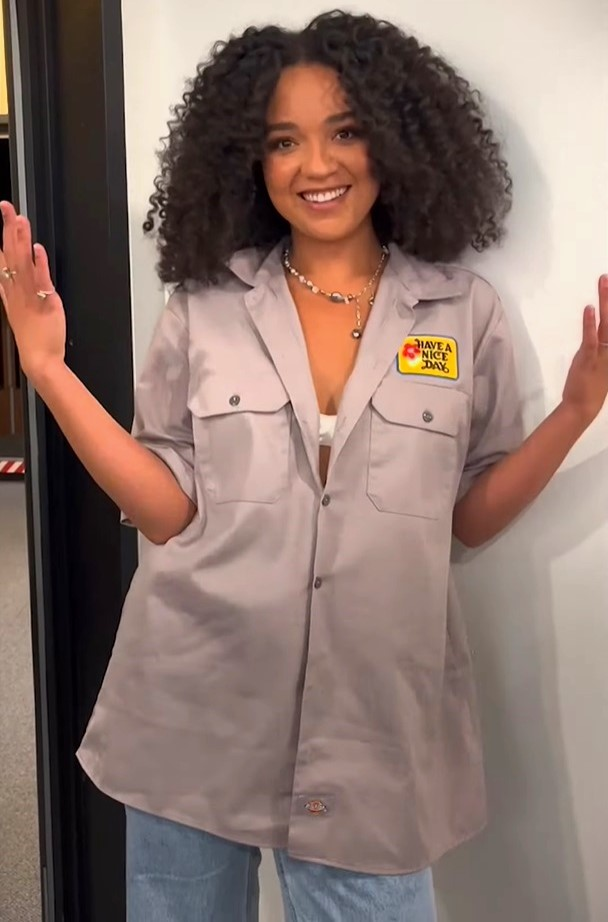
- Dee in 2023
- Born: 1993 (age 32–33); Gold Coast, Queensland, Australia
- Occupations: Actress, singer
- Years active: 2008–present

Aisha Dee (born 1993) is an Australian actress and singer. She is known for her main roles as Desi Biggins on the children's television series The Saddle Club (2008–09), Kat Edison on the Freeform comedy-drama television series The Bold Type (2017–21), and Phoebe in the 2023 Australian drama miniseries Safe Home.

== Early life and education ==
Aisha Dee was born in 1993 on the Gold Coast, Queensland, Australia, to a white Australian mother and African American father.

She was raised in Surfers Paradise and attended King's Christian College throughout her upbringing. Dee was exposed to the performing arts early in life through her opera singer mother and her jazz musician father. She credits watching Sesame Street reruns in her Gold Coast apartment in her younger years as the inspiration for pursuing a career in acting.

== Career ==
In 2008, Dee had her first major television role as Desi Biggins on the Australian-Canadian children's series The Saddle Club. In 2010, Dee was a recurring character in the Australian-British show Dead Gorgeous as Christine. From 2011 to 2013, she starred as Mackenzie Miller in the Fox sitcom I Hate My Teenage Daughter. She also co-starred as Elizabeth "Beth" Kingston on the ABC Family drama series Chasing Life, from 2014 to 2015.

Dee starred as Jules Koja in the Syfy horror anthology series Channel Zero: No-End House, which aired in 2017. On 22 August 2016, it was announced that Dee was cast as Kat Edison in the Freeform comedy-drama series The Bold Type, which premiered on 20 June 2017. On 4 October 2017, Freeform renewed the series for two additional seasons of 10 episodes each. The second season premiered on 12 June 2018 and ended on 7 August 2018.

Dee played the lead role in the 2023 Australian TV drama miniseries, Safe Home.

On 18 February 2025, Dee was named in two Stan projects in film One More Shot and series Watching You.

Dee plays Chanelle in the 2025 Netflix limited series Apple Cider Vinegar.

== Personal life ==
Dee is queer. She enjoys line dancing.

== Filmography ==
=== Film ===
Year	Title	Role	Notes	Ref
2015	TheCavKid	Maura	Short film	
2020	The Nowhere Inn	Kayla		
2022	Sissy	Cecilia / Sissy		
2022	Look Both Ways	Cara		
2022	Collide	Lily		
2025	One More Shot	Jenny		

=== Television ===
Year	Title	Role	Notes
2008–2009	The Saddle Club	Desiree "Desi" Biggins	Recurring role; 24 episodes
2009	Skyrunners	Katherine "Katie" Wallace	Television film
2010	Dead Gorgeous	Christine	Main role; 13 episodes
2011–2013	I Hate My Teenage Daughter	Mackenzie	Main role; 13 episodes
2011	Terra Nova	Tasha	Guest role; 2 episodes
2014–2015	Chasing Life	Elizabeth "Beth" Kingston	Main role; 34 episodes
2015	Baby Daddy	Olivia	Episode: "House of Cards"
2015	Comedy Bang! Bang!	Teen friend	Episode: "Thomas Middleditch Wears an Enigmatic Sweatshirt and Sweatpants and Pockets"
2016–2017	Sweet/Vicious	Kennedy	Main role; 10 episodes
2017–2021	The Bold Type	Kat Edison	Main role; 52 episodes
2017	Channel Zero: No-End House	Jules Koja	Main role; 6 episodes
2019	Ghosting: The Spirit of Christmas	Jess	Television film
2020	Celebrity Family Feud	Herself	Episode: "The Bold Type vs. RuPaul's Drag Race"
2023	Accused	Aaliyah Harris	Episode: "Esme's Story"
2023	Safe Home	Phoebe	Main role; 4 episodes
2025	Apple Cider Vinegar	Chanelle	Miniseries: 6 episodes
2025	Watching You	Lina	TV series: 6 episodes

== Awards and nominations ==
Year	Award	Category	Work	Result	Ref
2017	Teen Choice Awards	Choice Summer TV Star	The Bold Type	Nominated	
2018	Teen Choice Awards	Choice Summer TV Star	The Bold Type	Nominated	
2022	AACTA Awards	Best Actress	Sissy	Nominated	
2023	Asian Academy Creative Awards	Best Actress in a Leading Role	Safe Home	Won	
2024	AACTA Awards	Best Lead Actress	Safe Home	Nominated	
2024	Logie Awards	Best Lead Actress in a Drama	Safe Home	Nominated	
2025	Logie Awards	Best Supporting Actress	Apple Cider Vinegar	Pending	

== Discography ==
=== The Saddle Club discography ===
Albums

- Best Friends (2009)
- Grand Gallop – Meilleures Amies (2009) – Released in France only

Singles

- "These Girls" (2009)

=== Dee Dee & the Beagles ===
Albums

- Dee Dee & the Beagles EP (2015)

=== Aisha Dee ===
Albums

- Ice in My Rosé EP (2020)
- Suitcase EP (2023)
