= Safe Home (TV series) =

Australian TV series

- Genre: Drama; Thriller
- Created by: Anna Barnes
- Written by: Anna Barnes; Jean Tong; Michelle Law
- Directed by: Stevie Cruz-Martin
- Starring: Aisha Dee; Virginia Gay; Mabel Li; Thomas Cocquerel; Tegan Stimson; Janet Andrewartha; Ian Bliss
- Composer: Helena Czajka
- Country of origin: Australia
- Original language: English
- No. of episodes: 4

Production
- Producers: Imogen Banks; Emelyne Palmer
- Cinematography: Kieran Fowler
- Editor: Melanie Annan
- Running time: 60 minutes
- Production company: Kindling Pictures

Original release
- Network: SBS
- Release: 11 May 2023

Safe Home is a 2023 Australian drama miniseries which premiered on SBS Television and SBS on Demand on 11 May 2023. Set in Melbourne, the story centres on communications specialist Phoebe, played by Aisha Dee, as she starts a new job in a legal aid centre for survivors of family violence. Safe Home aired on Hulu on 9 January 2024, in its United States premiere, and aired in the UK in mid-September 2025 on the Channel Four streaming service.

== Plot ==
Safe Home follows the story of Phoebe Rook, a young communications specialist, who leaves her job at a prominent law firm in Melbourne to work at a community legal centre specialising in family violence that is being threatened with the withdrawal of funding.

The story begins with Phoebe leaving her job and starting a new one at a Family Violence Legal Centre (FLVS) where she is welcomed by numerous people who think she is a client, and by staff who thinks she is a lawyer. Phoebe meets Jenny at the courthouse, where Phoebe makes a mistake that threatens the life of one of the clients when she lets someone else into the secure room with the client Cherry (Katlyn Wong) who is frightened at what is happening. Jenny tells Eve that Phoebe shouldn't be working with them as she let someone into the secure room. Jenny, annoyed, leaves the room. At the same time, Phoebe is giving evidence to a detective about an investigation. The investigation is later revealed to be a murder investigation.

Meanwhile in a small town in country Victoria, hardworking grandmother Diana struggles to adjust to life after her controlling husband Jon retires from his job. Diana struggles to live with him as he controls every aspect of her life. He embarrasses Diana by cutting off her money while she is at the shops and he comes down to pay for everything and he tells her work that she will no longer be coming in anymore. Diana's last straw is being locked out of the house and walking through town to the police station during a rain storm. When Diana returns home she decides she needs to leave and fast so during a visit from their grandchild Diana steals ketamine and poisons Jon's beloved horse. When Jon rushes his horse to the vet Diana leaves Jon and goes to the city to seek refuge with her sister, where he calls her numerous times.

While Phoebe discusses with Detective O'Connor how she knew the victim, she explains her relationship with the victim, where it is revealed by flashback she started her relationship with Julian when he was having trouble with his wife Grace she says that the two grew a close bond, but she didn't realise just how dangerous he really was.

Phoebe gets media coverage for FVLS after speaking with her journalist friend Layla who tells her that her editor is sick of reporting on domestic violence and wants a bigger story. Phoebe tells FVLS staff that the profile being used is to bring attention to the upcoming funding cuts to the service and staff. Awkwardly, this includes her ex-lover Julian and his wife, and her former boss, Grace. But it is a run in with the sleazy senior partner Priestly that leaves Phoebe nervous about what strings he can pull. Meanwhile, Diana runs to the city and she stays with her sister Lottie, and we meet young Ry who's starting a new job and looking for somewhere to sleep as she has run away from home and from her mother Nicole. As Ry struggles with homelessness, she is taken in by Xander after he notices that she has been sleeping in the work supply room. Ry begins a relationship with Xander but she leaves when he controls when she works and humiliates her at work by playing an inappropriate video. With nowhere left to go, Ry leaves and calls her mother, but to no avail.

We then meet Cherry, a mother of two who is struggling to navigate the confusing and complicated legal system and the school calling her to inform her that her kids have missed too many days of school. Cherry has limited English language and she struggles with post-traumatic stress disorder resulting from an attempt by her husband Kelvin to drown her in the bath. He tells the police that she tried to attack him..

While the minister and David tell Phoebe the FVLS funding will not be cut, Phoebe is congratulated by David and the minister. Eve is happy about the centre being saved but Jenny realises something is up with Phoebe after the visit to court with David she feels that she is unable to cope..

Phoebe reveals in an interview with the police that she learned of an intervention order (IVO) being placed on Grace by Julian, and is rocked by the revelations that there is video proof of Julian attacking Grace while the two were at work. Grace has asked Eve to help her out of the country and get back to New Zealand as it is no longer safe to be in Melbourne. Phoebe rushes to court to find out what is going on. But when the IVO hearing doesn't go as planned and Eve learns that Grace had been set up by Julian as the IVO was granted against Grace, things suddenly become dangerous for Phoebe and the staff at the Family Violence Legal Service when Julian runs Grace over in a murder-suicide as Phoebe runs to see what is happening after leaving court. The staff are watching on as a News Reporter reports what happened, the centre is in shock by what occurred outside.

As Phoebe sits at home Layla comes around with the front page, Phoebe blames Layla for what happened saying that all Layla wanted was her big story and Phoebe had given it to her with the Family Violence centre, Layla says that wasn't it and so much more happen between what went to print and what was going on behind the scenes.

Ry speaks with her boss who she pays the money she owes him for sleeping in the shop, he tells her that he has fired Xander for what he had done. Luke sees the marks on Ry's arm and asks if Xander attacked her and Ry denies it saying that it was actually her mother because she has 'her issues'. Luke offers to help her.

As Phoebe overlooks the city she sees Eve from the balcony of the building and the two catch up. Eve reveals that she is leaving FVSL after what happened as she decides to carry on Grace's memory by taking over the role she has left vacant. Eve says to Phoebe she wants Jenny to take over her main role and Phoebe to come back and support her. Phoebe ultimately agrees, as later the FVSL Centre hold a candlelight vigil by the water.

As Diana, Ry, and Cherry all intersect at the centre, Phoebe is telling a journalist the true meaning of what victims of Family Violence face and how the centre and places like that are helping victims out of a situation.

== Cast ==
- Aisha Dee as Phoebe Rook
- Mabel Li as Jenny Lee
- Virginia Gay as Eve
- Thomas Cocquerel as Julian MacDonald
- Antonia Prebble as Grace MacDonald
- Hal Cumpston as Max Kerr
- Chenoa Deemal as Layla
- David Roberts as Gerard Priestly
- Tegan Stimson as Ry
- Ian Bliss as Detective O'Connor
- Janet Andrewartha as Diana Thompson
- Oli Pizzey-Stratford as Logan
- Mark Mitchinson as Jon Thompson
- Arka Das as David
- Katlyn Wong as Cherry Yeo
- Yuchen Wang as Kelvin Yeo
- Sian Ewers as Sara
- Nicholas Burton as Xander
- Emily Havea as Jemima
- Peta Brady as Hila
- Sachin Joab as Luke
- Jacqueline Brennan as Nicole
- Tony Rickards as Magistrate John's

== Production ==
The four-part drama miniseries was created by playwright Anna Barnes, inspired by her time working at a family legal centre in Melbourne. It was produced by Imogen Banks and directed by Stevie Cruz-Martin. The series was filmed in Melbourne. During production many people involved in the sector were involved in the research of the show, including lawyers and psychologists working alongside cast and crew.

== Broadcast ==
Safe Home premiered on the Australian public television channel SBS Television and its streaming service SBS on Demand on 11 May 2023.

It had its US premiere on Hulu on 9 January 2024. It was broadcast free-to-air on the Channel Four streaming service in mid-September 2025.

== Reception and ratings ==
No.	Title	Airdate	Timeslot	Total Viewers	Ref
1	Episode 1	11/5/2023	8:30pm	82,000	
2	Episode 2	11/5/2023	8:30pm	82,000	
3	Episode 3	18/5/2023	8:30pm	61,000	
4	Episode 4	18/5/2023	8:30pm	61,000	

During media pre-screenings of Safe Home, David Knox of TV Tonight called the series "One of SBS's best dramas in years" and praised the show for dealing with the topic.

It was also well-received by critics in the UK.

== Accolades ==
Asian Academy Creative Awards
Year	Category	Nominee	Result	Notes
2023	Best Drama Series	Safe Home	Won	
2023	Best Actress in a Leading Role	Safe Home- Aisha Dee	Won	
2023	Best Direction	Safe Home- Stevie Cruz-Martin	Won	

Screen Music Awards
Year	Category	Nominee	Result	Notes
2023	Best Music for a Television Series or Serial	Safe Home - Helena Czajka	Nominated	

Casting Guild of Australia Award
Year	Category	Nominee	Result	Notes
2023	Best Casting in a Telemovie/TV Miniseries	Nathan Lloyd	Won	

AACTA Awards
Year	Category	Nominee	Result	Notes
2024	Best Casting	Nathan Lloyd	Nominated	
2024	Best Lead Actress	Aisha Dee	Nominated	
2024	Best Miniseries	Safe Home	Nominated	

New South Wales Premier's Literary Awards
Year	Category	Nominee	Result	Notes
2024	Betty Roland Prize for Scriptwriting	Anna Barnes	Won	

Equity Ensemble Awards
Year	Category	Nominee	Result	Notes
2024	Outstanding Performance by an Ensemble in a Mini-Series/Telemovie	Safe Home	Won	

TV Week Logie Awards
Year	Category	Nominee	Result	Ref
2024	Best Supporting Actress	Mabel Li	Nominated	
2024	Best Lead Actress in a Drama	Aisha Dee	Nominated	
2024	Best Miniseries or Telemovie	Safe Home	Nominated	

== See also ==
- List of Australian television series
