= Careless (TV series) =

UK-Australian television series

- Created by: Helen FitzGerald; Louise Fox
- Written by: Louise Fox; Christian White
- Directed by: Stevie Cruz-Martin
- Starring: Solly McLeod; Katie Leung; Robyn Malcolm; Richard Roxburgh
- Countries of origin: Australia; United Kingdom
- Original language: English
- No. of series: 1
- No. of episodes: 4

Production
- Executive producers: Louise Fox; Ian Collie; Rob Gibson; Adrian Burns; Claire Mundell; Deanne Cunningham; Michael Healy; Andy Ryan; Kieran Hannigan
- Producer: Angela Littlejohn
- Running time: 46 minutes
- Production companies: Synchronicity Films; Easy Tiger Productions

Original release
- Network: Stan; Channel 4
- Release: 2 December 2026

Careless is an upcoming Australian and British television drama series created by Helen FitzGerald and Louise Fox. It is starring Solly McLeod, Katie Leung, Robyn Malcolm and Richard Roxburgh. It is scheduled to broadcast on Channel 4 on 2 December 2026.

== Premise ==
A Scottish backpacker in Australia starts working as a carer for an aging rockstar.

== Cast ==
- Solly McLeod as Robbie
- Katie Leung as Sheila
- Robyn Malcolm as Angela Garton
- Richard Roxburgh as Mike Garton
- Mabel Li as Hannah Garton
- Thomas Weatherall as Colm
- Alison Peebles as Morven Barclay

== Production ==
The four-part series is created by Helen FitzGerald and Louise Fox and directed by Stevie Cruz-Martin. Based on an original story by novelist FitzGerald, its first two and final episodes are written by Fox, with Christian White writing the third episode. It was commissioned as an original drama by Stan and produced in association with Channel 4, All3Media International, Screen Scotland, and Australia's Nine Network. It is produced by Easy Tiger Productions and Synchronicity Films, with Angela Littlejohn serving as series producer, along with Ian Collie and Rob Gibson as executive producers for Easy Tiger, and Claire Mundell and Deanne Cunningham as executive producers for Synchronicity. Fox and Adrian Burns are also executive producers, as are Michael Healy and Andy Ryan for Stan, and Kieran Hannigan for Screen Scotland.

The cast is led by Solly McLeod, Katie Leung, Robyn Malcolm and Richard Roxburgh, with Mabel Li, Thomas Weatherall and Alison Peebles.

Filming was underway in January 2026, with filming locations including Glasgow, Scotland and Sydney, Australia.

== Broadcast ==
The series is scheduled to broadcast in the United Kingdom on Channel 4 on 2 December 2026.
