= Collide (2022 film) =

- Movie poster
- Directed by: Mukunda Michael Dewil
- Written by: Mukunda Michael Dewil
- Produced by: Robert Ogden Barnum; Lucas Jarach
- Starring: Ryan Phillippe; Kat Graham; Jim Gaffigan
- Cinematography: Rasa Partin
- Music by: Sacha Chaban
- Production company: TPC
- Distributed by: Vertical Entertainment
- Release date: August 5, 2022
- Running time: 90 minutes
- Country: United States
- Language: English

Collide is a 2022 American thriller film written and directed by Mukunda Michael Dewil and starring Ryan Phillippe, Kat Graham and Jim Gaffigan.

== Plot ==
The film follows the lives of different people living in LA over the course of one evening.

== Cast ==
- Ryan Phillippe as Hunter
- Kat Graham as Tamira
- Jim Gaffigan as Peter
- David Cade as Mikey
- Dylan Flashner as Zee
- Drea de Matteo as Angie
- Aisha Dee as Lily
- David James Elliott as P.I.
- Paul Ben-Victor as Clyde
- Wilson Bethel as Travis

== Production ==
In January 2022, it was announced that filming wrapped.

== Release ==
The film was released in theaters on August 5, 2022 and on demand on August 12, 2022.

== Reception ==
Monique Jones of Common Sense Media awarded the film three stars out of five.
