= The Cry (2018 TV series) =

2018 drama series

- Genre: Psychological drama; Mystery
- Based on: The Cry by Helen FitzGerald
- Written by: Jacquelin Perske
- Directed by: Glendyn Ivin
- Starring: Jenna Coleman; Ewen Leslie; Asher Keddie; Stella Gonet; Sophie Kennedy; Markella Kavenagh; Alex Dimitriades; Shareena Clanton; Shauna Macdonald; Kate Dickie; David Elliot
- Theme music composer: Lorne Balfe
- Composer: Lorne Balfe
- Countries of origin: Australia; United Kingdom
- Original language: English
- No. of series: 1
- No. of episodes: 4

Production
- Executive producers: Claire Mundell; Elizabeth Kilgarriff; Gaynor Holmes
- Producers: Brian Kaczynski; Stuart Menzies
- Cinematography: Sam Chiplin
- Editor: Alastair Reid
- Running time: 60 minutes
- Production company: Synchronicity Films

Original release
- Network: ABC (Australia); BBC One (UK)
- Release: 30 September – 21 October 2018

The Cry is a 2018 television four-part mystery psychological drama written by Jacquelin Perske and adapted from the 2013 novel of the same name by Helen FitzGerald, which was broadcast on the ABC in Australia and BBC One in the UK. The series stars Jenna Coleman as Joanna Lyndsay, a schoolteacher whose four-month-old baby Noah disappears while she and her fiancé, Alistair (Ewen Leslie), are visiting family in Australia. The series was directed by Glendyn Ivin and produced by Synchronicity Films.

== Synopsis ==
Joanna and Alistair are young parents who travel from Scotland to a town in Australia to visit family and fight for custody of Alistair's daughter, Chloe, against his Australian ex-wife, Alexandra. On the drive from Melbourne to the coastal town of Wilde Bay, their baby son Noah goes missing. In the aftermath of the tragedy, under public scrutiny, their relationship collapses and her psychological state disintegrates.

== Awards ==
The show was nominated for an International Emmy in 2019.

== Cast and characters ==
- Jenna Coleman as Joanna Lindsay; a primary school teacher living in Glasgow.
- Ewen Leslie as Alistair Robertson; an Australian working in Scotland as a media spin doctor and Joanna's fiancé
- Asher Keddie as Alexandra Grenville; Alistair's ex-wife and mother of Chloe
- Stella Gonet as Elizabeth Robertson; Alistair's mother
- Sophie Kennedy as Kirsty; Joanna's best friend
- Markella Kavenagh as Chloe Robertson; Alistair and Alexandra's daughter
- Alex Dimitriades as Detective Peter Alexiades; Melbourne police detective and a school friend of Alistair's
- Shareena Clanton as Detective Lorna Jones; partner of Detective Peter Alexiades
- Shauna Macdonald as Dr. Wallace; Joanna's psychiatrist
- Kate Dickie as Morven Davis
- David Elliot as Henry McCallum
- Sue Jones as Mrs Wilson
- Eddie Baroo as Trucker

== Episodes ==
No.	Episode	Directed by	Written by	Original release date	UK viewers (millions)
1	Episode 1	Glendyn Ivin	Jacquelin Perske	30 September 2018	7.54
During a court-ordered meeting with a psychologist, schoolteacher Joanna Lyndsay begins to recount her life as a troubled parent and partner via flashbacks. In one of these flashbacks, her Australian fiancé, Alistair, receives word that his ex-wife in Australia is preparing a custody battle over his teenage daughter Chloe. Reluctantly Joanna decides to travel with him, bringing their infant son Noah. On the flight to Australia, Joanna lashes out at a passenger when complaints of Noah’s crying get out of hand. After landing, Alistair and Joanna continue their journey by car, stopping at a shop to buy supplies. When they return to the car Noah has mysteriously disappeared.
2	Episode 2	Glendyn Ivin	Jacquelin Perske	7 October 2018	6.52
Detectives Peter Alexiades and Lorna Jones arrive to lead the investigation. They treat Noah's disappearance as a kidnapping for ransom and focus on Alexandra's movements. Joanna suffers nightmares about a boy in a field after a bushfire. Alistair is concerned that her odd behaviour will turn the public against them and begins coaching her in how to handle the media. She ignores Peter's advice and uses a mobile phone to follow the case on social media. Alexandra lies to the police about her movements but admits to creating a fake Facebook profile to stalk Joanna. She is arrested when one of Noah's bootees is found in her home. A witness claims to have seen Joanna and Alistair fighting hours before Noah's disappearance. A flashback reveals that Noah was not in the car when Joanna and Alistair stopped to buy supplies.
3	Episode 3	Glendyn Ivin	Jacquelin Perske	14 October 2018	6.68
In the hours after arriving in Australia, Joanna discovers that Noah died in the back seat of the car. He is apparently a victim of Sudden Infant Death Syndrome, but Alistair convinces Joanna that she will be charged with manslaughter. He comes up with a plan to cover up Noah's death, parking outside the shop because he knows it is near the route Alexandra uses when running. He later takes Noah's body and buries it. Alexandra is released and the charges dropped; Alistair confronts her and it is implied that he was violent toward her when they were married. Joanna continues to obsess over social media coverage of the case, but realises that Alistair's handling of the media is making her look guilty. She concludes that he will sacrifice her to save himself. In the present Joanna is about to be sentenced; not for Noah's death, but for Alistair's murder.
4	Episode 4	Glendyn Ivin	Jacquelin Perske	21 October 2018	7.35
Four months after Noah's death, Joanna and Alistair return to Scotland where they struggle to move on with their lives. Joanna receives a message from a passenger on the flight to Australia, which triggers a memory: after arriving in Melbourne, Alistair gave Noah medicine not realising that it had been prescribed to Joanna and causing Noah to overdose. Realising what had happened, he let Joanna believe she was responsible. Joanna begins to suspect Alistair has been lying and the two go for a drive. She accelerates recklessly, causing him to lose his temper and admit his role in Noah's death. Joanna releases Alistair's seatbelt and deliberately drives off the road, killing him. Joanna is found not guilty of his murder, but it is a hollow victory as many people—including Chloe—believe that she is still responsible for Noah's death. She returns to Australia to be close to his memory. Noah's body is never found. But Joanna realises Alistair buried Noah under the concrete pad of a new house which she has bought.

== Production ==
The Cry is an adaptation of the novel of the same name by Helen FitzGerald. The series is produced by Synchronicity Films, directed by Glendyn Ivin and written for television by Jacquelin Perske.

Filming for the series commenced in February 2018, initially taking place in Australia. Filming later moved to Scotland in April 2018. Jenna Coleman, who portrays Joanna in the lead role, completed filming for the series in Australia and Glasgow in May 2018, so that production on the third series of Victoria could commence.

== Release ==
The Cry comprises four episodes and premiered in the UK on BBC One on 30 September 2018. The series premiered in Australia on ABC on 3 February 2019.
