= Neil D'Souza =

British actor and playwright

Neil D'Souza is a British actor and writer. Significant roles include Rajesh In the Long Run (2018), Steve Covell in Humans (2015), Bob in the Bafta-winning Alma's Not Normal and Vikram in Slow Horses. D'Souza studied at the University Of Ulster, after which he trained at RADA.

Credits include his self-penned play Out Of Season, The Mahabharata, Beginners, The Village, How To Hold Your Breath and Khandan, Drawing The Line, Much Ado About Nothing, Midnight's Children and The Hypocrite, Tintin, Man Of Mode, The Merchant of Venice and The Honest Whore, Coming Up and Small Miracle.

His stage play Out Of Season was described as "genius" by the Guardian and "hilarious yet devastating" by the Stage.

In September 2025, D.Souza was cast as 'the Paramedic' in the upcoming film The Man with the Plan.
