= Domestic noir =

Crime fiction genre

Domestic noir is a literary subgenre within crime fiction. Though used earlier in discussion of the film noir subgenre, the term was applied to fiction in 2013 by novelist Julia Crouch, who has been described by crime writer Elizabeth Haynes as "the queen of domestic noir". Crouch defined the subgenre in her blog:

In a nutshell, Domestic Noir takes place primarily in homes and workplaces, concerns itself largely (but not exclusively) with the female experience, is based around relationships and takes as its base a broadly feminist view that the domestic sphere is a challenging and sometimes dangerous prospect for its inhabitants. That’s pretty much all of my work described there.

Crouch's novels, Cuckoo, The Long Fall, Tarnished and Every Vow You Break, had previously been categorized as psychological thrillers, a label she felt inadequate: 'The engine driving my work is more an unravelling than the high octane roller coaster suggested by the word 'thriller'.'

The term was embraced by fellow novelists, including Rebecca Whitney in an article in the Independent newspaper, where she describes her own subject as 'the toxic marriage and its fall-out.' Whitney quotes Sophie Orme, Senior Editor at Mantle, on the appeal of Domestic Noir:

'Readers have a constant thirst for dark realism in novels; for books in which they can identify with the principal characters yet find themselves taken out of their day to day experiences. Marriage seems to me to be the ultimate setting to explore here – the culmination of a journey of love, a partnership, a relationship in which a couple places themselves in one another's hands entirely, where really the stakes could not be higher.’

Another crime novelist, A.J.Waines, describes domestic noir in her blog:

'The Family...is a cauldron for crime, bringing with it abductions, incarcerations, issues with infertility, infidelity and missing children. The home is rife with buried family secrets that come back to haunt us. This subgenre plays on the idea that the home is the safest place to be – OR IS IT..?'

The subgenre has also been labelled 'chick noir', though the novelist Luana Lewis has written that this term was 'viewed as offensive and degrading by many....The word “chick” inevitably implies female; or synonym for ‘not to be taken seriously'.'

Other women writing domestic noir include Erin Kelly, Araminta Hall, Paula Hawkins, Gillian Flynn, Elizabeth Haynes, Sabine Durrant, Natalie Young, Louise Millar, Paula Daly, Samantha Hayes, Louise Doughty, Julie Myerson, Jean Hanff Korelitz, A. S. A. Harrison and Lionel Shriver. There are also male writers of the subgenre, such as S. J. Watson and Tom Vowler.
