= Julia Crouch (novelist) =

British novelist

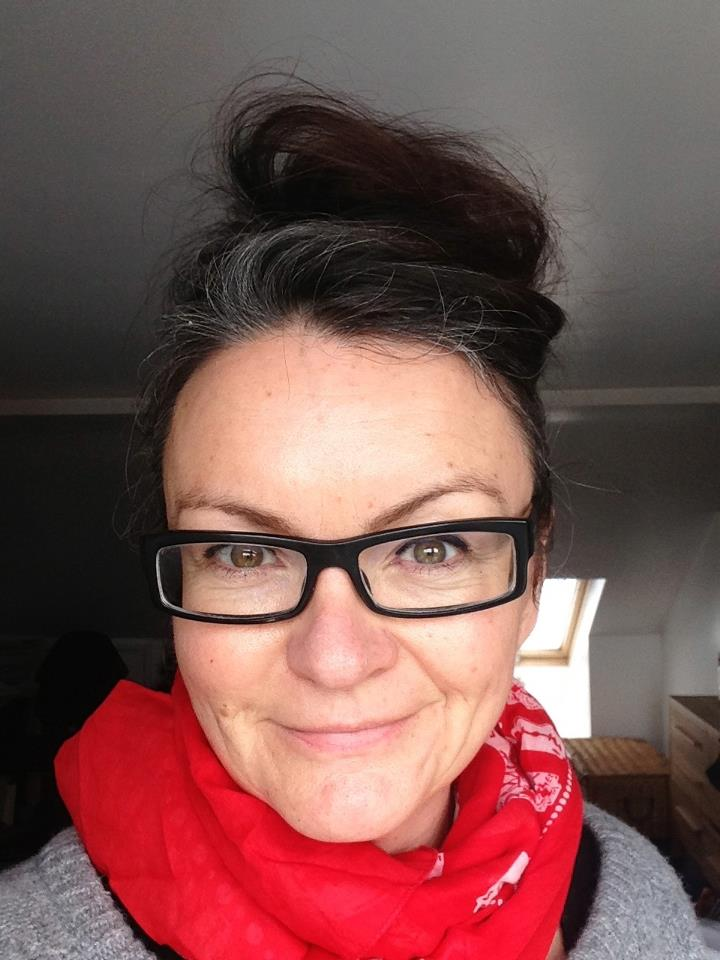
- Julia Crouch
- Born: Ilford, England
- Occupation: Novelist
- Website: juliacrouch.co.uk

Julia Crouch is a British novelist, who writes Domestic Noir, a sub-genre of crime fiction. The term was first applied to fiction in 2012 by Crouch herself, who has been called "The Queen of Domestic Noir". She described the form in her blog:

In a nutshell, Domestic Noir takes place primarily in homes and workplaces, concerns itself largely (but not exclusively) with the female experience, is based around relationships and takes as its base a broadly feminist view that the domestic sphere is a challenging and sometimes dangerous prospect for its inhabitants. That’s pretty much all of my work described there.

The term was widely accepted by the publishing industry and Crouch went on to write the introduction to Domestic Noir: The New Face of 21st Century Crime Fiction, published by Palgrave Macmillan in 2018.

Crouch spent four years as Visiting Fellow on the University of East Anglia Crime Writing MA. She is a Royal Literary Fund Fellow at the University of Brighton and teaches for Faber Academy and the National Centre for Writing in Norwich. With fellow author William Shaw, she hosts bi-monthly Brighton Crime Wave events at Waterstones bookshop, where they interview other crime fiction authors.

== Early life ==
Born Julia Collins in Ilford, she grew up in Northampton and Cambridge. From 1981 to 1983, she studied for a degree in drama at Bristol University, where she met her husband, Tim Crouch, the playwright and actor. After graduating, in 1984, they co-founded Public Parts Theatre Company. As Julia Limer, she directed and co-devised a dozen Public Parts plays between 1984 and 1991. Their work was performed in "all sorts of venues - from caves in Gloucestershire, to prisons, schools, and major national theatres like the Bristol Old Vic, West Yorkshire Playhouse and the Bush in London." Public Parts shows included an adaptation of Ford Madox Ford's The Good Soldier, and The Marvelous Boy, about the poet Thomas Chatterton.

After having children, Julia Crouch retrained as a graphic designer, which led to a new career in illustration and website design. In 2002, she did an MA in sequential illustration at the University of Brighton. She specialised in writing and illustrating children's books, which were rejected by publishers as "too dark". Crouch later wrote, "I was undeterred: my love of narrative had been stirred up, and I realised that the words came to me far more readily than the pictures. So I went on to do an Open University Course in Creative Writing, developing my dark side writing fiction for adults."

== Fiction ==
Crouch wrote her first novel in November 2008, as part of the National Novel Writing Month, which encourages new writers to complete a 50,000 word text in just a month. For NanoWriMo in 2009, she wrote the first draft of her first published novel, Cuckoo, published by Headline in 2011.

Rose, the protagonist of Cuckoo, has a seemingly perfect family life, which unravels after she invites her best friend, Polly, to stay.

Crouch's second novel, Every Vow You Break, in 2012, drew on her background in theatre. The central character is Lara, wife of third-rate actor Marcus Wayland, spending a summer with him in upstate New York. When Lara's old flame, now a famous movie star, turns up, she finds him hard to resist. In the Guardian, Laura Wilson wrote, "Crouch excels at creating an atmosphere of low level menace, slowly ratcheting up the tension to full-on horror for another terrific page-turner."

In 2012, Crouch was East Coast Rail's first ever writer in residence on the London to Harrogate line. Over the course of a return journey, she wrote the short story, 'Strangeness on a Train', published by Hodder Headline as an ebook.

For her third novel, Tarnished, in 2013, Crouch moved away from the aspirational settings of the previous two. The central character, Peg, is a lesbian librarian visiting her beloved Nan, who has dementia, and an obese bedridden aunt. Peg, who has no memories of her childhood, sets out to track down her estranged father. The Lancashire Guardian described Tarnished as "the third and undoubtedly best thriller so far from the pen of Julia Crouch...a masterclass in menace, a slow-burning, psychological story of love, guilt and obsession which takes us into the deepest, darkest corners of the human mind." In the Telegraph, Terry Ramsey described the novel as "a memorably disquieting story that twists brilliantly from its humdrum, kitchen-sink opening to a chilling, destructive ending."

The Long Fall (2014) has a double narrative, moving between the stories of Emma, a young backpacker in Greece, in 1980, and Kate, a prominent charity campaigner in present-day London. A chain of violent events is put in motion that changes the course of Emma's life. Three decades later these events unexpectedly catch up with Kate. For Joan Smith, in The Sunday Times,The Long Fall was "a tense and dramatic novel, switching seamlessly between two time periods".

In Her Husband's Lover (2017) Crouch created two unreliable narrators, Louisa, the wife, and Sophie, her husband's lover.

With The New Mother, in 2021, Crouch looked at the world of social media. Every other chapter is written as an Instagram post. Rachel, a pregnant Instagram influencer, who is determined to lead a perfect life, invites Abbie, her most ardent follower, to work as a live-in mother's helper. Abbie's illusions are shattered when she learns that Rachel's online life is a carefully curated facade. As Abbie's anger and resentment grows, dark secrets that both women are hiding are slowly revealed.

== Bibliography ==
=== Novels ===
- Cuckoo, Headline, 2011
- Every Vow You Break, Headline, 2012
- Tarnished, Headline, 2013
- The Long Fall, Headline, 2014
- Her Husband's Lover, Headline, 2017
- The New Mother, Bookouture, 2021
- The Daughters, Bookouture, 2022
- The Perfect Date, Bookouture, 2023
