= Brussels International Animation Film Festival =

Animation film festival in Brussels, Belgium

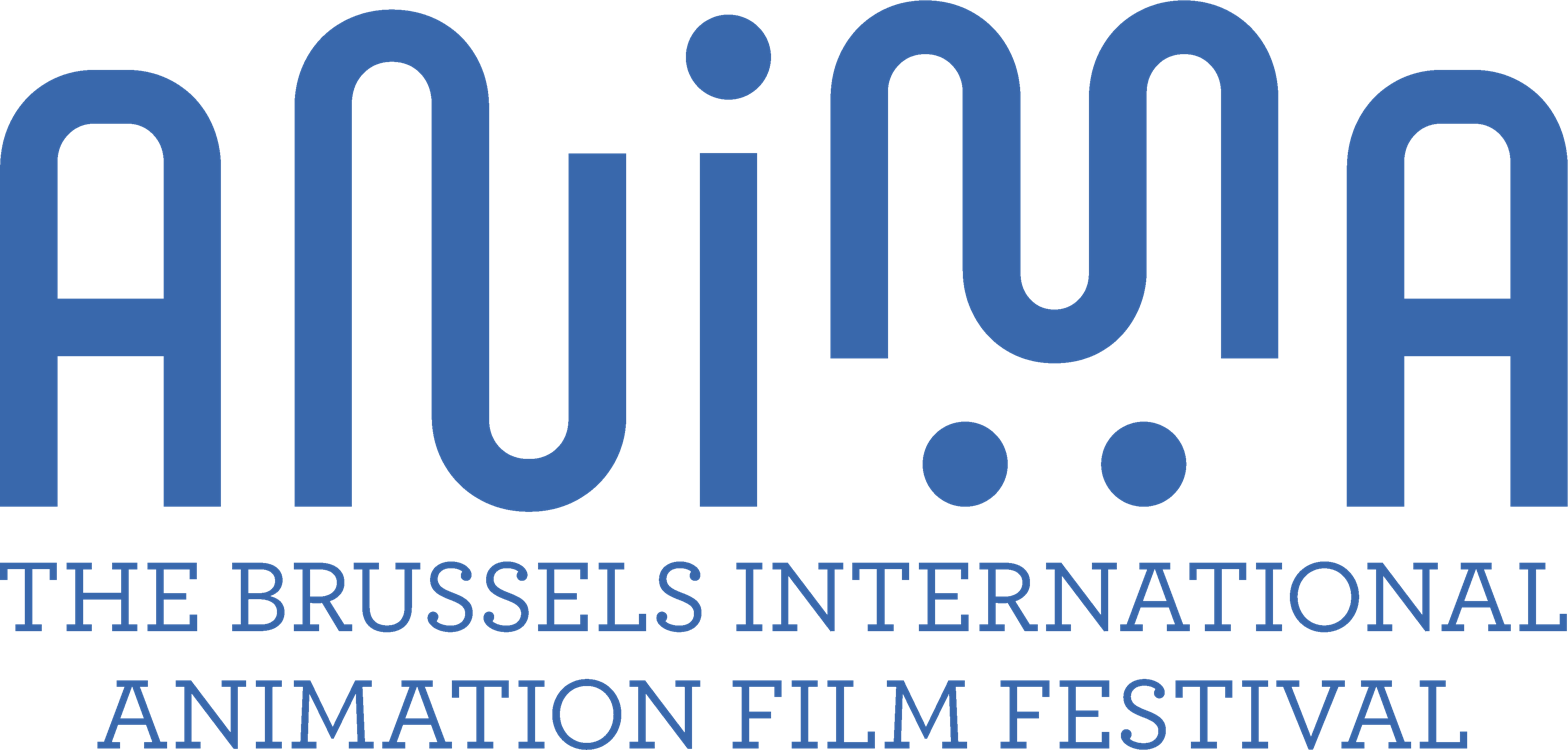
- Location: Brussels, Belgium
- Founded: 1982; 44 years ago
- Awards: Anima Grand Prix
- Language: English, French, Dutch
- Website: animafestival.be

The Brussels International Animation Film Festival, commonly known as Anima Festival, is an annual animation film festival held in Brussels, Belgium. Founded in 1982, it has been an Academy Award qualifying festival since 2014, with its international animated short film Grand Prix winner becoming eligible for the Oscars.

== History ==
The festival was founded in 1982 in Brussels by Philippe Moins under the name Rencontres du cinéma d'animation (Animation Film Encounters). The inaugural edition was organized while Moins was completing his civilian service with the Confédération Parascolaire and was held at the Riches-Claires Cultural Centre, where it attracted an audience of 1,500 people.

Throughout its history, the event underwent multiple name changes, including Semaine de l'animation and Festival du dessin animé, before officially adopting the name Anima in 2003. In 2014, Anima became an Academy Award–qualifying festival after receiving recognition from the Academy of Motion Picture Arts and Sciences. Since then, the Grand Prix winner of its international animated short film competition has been eligible for consideration in the Academy Award for Best Animated Short Film category. That same year, founder Philippe Moins stepped down from the festival's leadership after 33 years, remaining involved thereafter as an artistic consultant. In 2021, the festival's 40th edition was held entirely online because of the COVID-19 pandemic. Geoblocked to viewers within Belgium, the virtual event offered more than 250 films on demand alongside live online broadcasts. Additionally, Anima is recognized as a qualifying event for the British Academy Film Awards, with selected British short films becoming eligible for the BAFTA Award for Best Short Animation.

The festival's attendance increased from 1,500 visitors at its inaugural edition in 1982 to 5,000 in 1983, before ranging between 5,000 and 10,000 annually from 1984 to 1991. Attendance surpassed 20,000 after the festival relocated to Passage 44 in 1992, reached 35,000 by 1996, and totaled 35,000 spectators during both the 2009 and 2010 editions. By 2025, the festival attracted more than 30,000 visitors for a second consecutive year.
