= Practical Magic (franchise) =

American media franchise based on the books by Alice Hoffman

- Created by: Alice Hoffman
- Original work: Practical Magic (1995)
- Owners: Warner Bros. Entertainment (Skydance)
- Years: 1995-present

Print publications
- Novels: Practical Magic (1995); The Rules of Magic (2017); Magic Lessons (2020); The Book of Magic (2021)

Films and television
- Films: Practical Magic (1998); Practical Magic 2 (2026)
- Television series: Sudbury (2004 television pilot)

Practical Magic is an American media franchise consisting of four novels, two films, and a television pilot. The series is based on Alice Hoffman's book series of the same name.

== Book series ==
=== Practical Magic (1995) ===
For more than 200 years, the women of the Owens family have been blamed for everything that has gone wrong in the town of Sudbury, Massachusetts. Two Owens sisters, Gillian and Sally, are brought up by their two elderly guardian aunts in a world of spells and exotica from which they eventually escape: one by running away, the other by marrying. Many years go by before strange circumstances thrust the sisters together again, where they return to a world that blends the mundane and the mysterious, the familiar and the fantastic, the normal and the numinous. Three generations of Owens women must unite in an experience of unexpected insight and revelation, teaching them all that the perceptions provided by what is called the magical are rare and wonderful endowments.

=== The Rules of Magic (2017) ===
Set in the 1960s, years before the events of the first installment, the book follows the lives of the Owens siblings, Franny, Jet, and Vincent, as they navigate their unique magical abilities and the family curse that haunts them. Their mother, Susanna Owens, establishes strict rules to protect her children from the dangers of their magical heritage, which include: No walking in the moonlight, no red shoes, no wearing black, no cats or crows, no candles or books about magic, and most importantly, never fall in love.

=== Magic Lessons (2020) ===
In the 1600s, centuries before the original story, a baby named Maria is abandoned in a snowy English field. Under the care of gentle Hannah Owens, Maria learns about the "Unnamed Arts", for which she has a gift - a gift that may well prove her undoing. When Maria is abandoned by the man she loves, she invokes the curse that will haunt her family for centuries. Because magic has rules, and they must be followed. This is the lesson that Maria will carry with her for the rest of her life, and pass on to her children and her children's children.

=== The Book of Magic (2021) ===
Set years after the first book, Jet Owens hears the sound of the deathwatch beetle, knowing that it is a signal, having finally discovered the secret to breaking a curse. But time is running out, as she has only seven days left to live. Unaware of the family's witchcraft lineage and all it entails, one of the young sisters of the new Owens generation has fallen in love. As the curse strikes, her love's fate hangs in the balance, prompting three generations of Owens women to venture back to the English countryside where it all began and use their gifts to break the spell that has marked all their lives.

== Film series ==
Film	U.S. release date	Director	Screenwriter(s)	Producer(s)	Status
Practical Magic	October 16, 1998	Griffin Dunne	Adam Brooks, Robin Swicord & Akiva Goldsman	Denise Di Novi	Released
Practical Magic 2	September 10, 2026	Susanne Bier	Akiva Goldsman & Georgia Pritchett	Nicole Kidman, Sandra Bullock & Denise Di Novi	Released

=== Practical Magic (1998) ===
Two sisters, Sally (Sandra Bullock) and Gillian Owens (Nicole Kidman) are raised after their parents' deaths by their two aunts Frances (Stockard Channing) and Jet (Dianne Wiest), the sisters grew up in a Sudbury, Massachusetts household that was anything but typical. Their aunts fed them chocolate cake for breakfast and taught them magic. The Owens' sorcery also carries a price: the men with whom they fall in love with are doomed to an untimely death. As adult women with very different personalities, the quiet Sally and the fiery Gillian must use their powers to fight a family curse.

=== Practical Magic 2 (2026) ===
In June 2024, it was announced that a sequel was in development, with Bullock and Kidman in talks to return as well as produce alongside original producer Denise Di Novi. Later that same month, Nicole Kidman confirmed that she and Sandra Bullock would reprise their roles in the sequel. Akiva Goldsman, who co-wrote the screenplay for the original film, would return to write the script. Griffin Dunne hinted that a woman will direct the sequel, while he will serve as an executive producer.

The sequel is based on Alice Hoffman's 2021 novel The Book of Magic, the fourth installment in her Practical Magic series. Although the timeline was uncertain, in August 2024, producer Denise Di Novi was optimistic about beginning production next year. In January 2025, Susanne Bier was reportedly in talks to direct the sequel. In February 2025, Kidman mentioned that the sequel was "moving ahead rapidly". Three months later, it was announced that Bier would direct the film, which is scheduled for release on September 18, 2026.

In July 2025, it was announced Joey King and Maisie Williams had been cast as Sally's daughters Kylie and Antonia. That same month, it was revealed Stockard Channing and Dianne Wiest would reprise their roles as Frances and Jet, respectively; Lee Pace, Xolo Maridueña, and Solly McLeod were also cast as Professor Ian Wright, Gideon, and Thomas "Tom" Lockland. Principal photography began on July 18, 2025 and wrapped on September 13 of that year. In February 2026, the release date was moved up to September 10, 2026.

== Television ==
=== Sudbury (2004) ===
In 2004, Warner Bros. and CBS produced Sudbury, a television pilot written by Becky Hartman Edwards and directed by Bryan Spicer starring Kim Delaney in the role played by Bullock in the film and Jeri Ryan in the role played by Kidman. The series, named for the Sudbury, Massachusetts location of the novel and film, was not picked up.

=== Unrealized projects ===
In 2010, Warner Bros. and ABC Family attempted to develop a reboot television series.

In 2019, it was announced that HBO Max was developing a prequel television series, based on Alice Hoffman's 2017 prequel novel, The Rules of Magic, with Jessica Jones creator Melissa Rosenberg writing and executive producing. However, the project never came to fruition.

== Cast and characters ==
List indicators

This section includes characters who will appear or have appeared in more than two films in the series.

- An empty grey cell indicates the character was not in the film, or that the character's official presence has not yet been confirmed.
- ^{Y} indicates a younger version of the character.

Characters	Film		Television
Characters	Practical Magic	Practical Magic 2	Sudbury
Sally Owens	Sandra Bullock Camilla Belle^{Y}	Sandra Bullock	Kim Delaney
Gillian "Gilly" Owens	Nicole Kidman Lora Anne Criswell^{Y}	Nicole Kidman	Jeri Ryan
Frances "Franny" Owens	Stockard Channing	Stockard Channing	Dixie Carter
Bridget "Jet" Owens	Dianne Wiest	Dianne Wiest	Shirley Knight
Kylie Owens	Evan Rachel Wood	Joey King Scarlett Nasrat^{Y}	Gage Golightly
Antonia Owens	Alexandra Artrip	Maisie Williams Harriett Scott^{Y}	Kat Dennings
Officer Gary Hallet	Aidan Quinn		Esai Morales
James "Jimmy" Angelov	Goran Višnjić		
Michael	Mark Feuerstein		
Maria Owens	Caprice Benedetti	Ema Cavolli	
Jack	Peter Shaw		
Regina Owens	Caralyn Kozlowski		
Linda Bennett	Margo Martindale		
Carla	Chloe Webb		
Patty	Martha Gehman		
Sara	Lucinda Jenney		
Professor Ian Wright		Lee Pace	
Gideon		Xolo Maridueña	
Thomas "Tom" Lockland		Solly McLeod	
Paula		Katy Wix	
Mitch Newton			Nolan Gerard Funk
Rachel			Christie Laing
Deirdre			Devon Weigel

== Additional crew and production details ==
Title	Crew/Detail					
Title	Composer(s)	Cinematographer	Editor(s)	Production companies	Distributing companies	Running time
Practical Magic	Alan Silvestri	Andrew Dunn	Elizabeth Kling	Fortis Films; Di Novi Pictures; Village Roadshow Pictures	Warner Bros.	1 hr 44 mins
Sudbury	—N/a	David Geddes	John Earl Burnett	Warner Bros. Television	CBS	45 mins
Practical Magic 2	Rupert Gregson-Williams	Simon Duggan	Sam Williams	Alcon Entertainment; Di Novi Pictures; Fortis Films; Blossom Films	Warner Bros. Pictures	2 hr 10 mins

== Reception ==
=== SVOD viewership ===
On October 2, 2024, one day after its premiere on the Max streaming platform, Practical Magic entered the top 10 films chart, securing the #5 spot.

=== Box office performance ===
Film	Release date	Box office gross				Box office ranking		Budget	Ref(s)
Film	Release date	United States opening weekend	North America	Other territories	Worldwide	All time North America	All time worldwide	Budget	Ref(s)
Practical Magic	October 16, 1998	$13,104,694	$46,732,881	$47,700,000	$94,432,881	#2,062	#2,599	$75 million	
Practical Magic 2	September 10, 2026	$30,002,526	$68,690,092	$37,300,000	$105,990,092	—N/a	—N/a	$75 million	
Totals			$115,422,973	$85,000,000	$200,422,973			$150 million	

=== Critical and public response ===
Film	Critical		Public
Film	Rotten Tomatoes	Metacritic	CinemaScore
Practical Magic	31% (111 reviews)	48 (23 reviews)	B−
Sudbury	—N/a	—N/a	—N/a
Practical Magic 2	35% (175 reviews)	44 (41 reviews)	B+

== In other media ==
=== Musical ===
On February 9, 2026, it was confirmed that a Broadway musical based on the first book and film of the series was in development, to be written by series author Alice Hoffman and Peter Duchan, with an original score by Norah Jones and Gregg Wattenberg, and Maria Friedman directing.

== See also ==
- List of films about witchcraft
