= Practical Magic (novel) =

Book by Alice Hoffman

- First edition
- Author: Alice Hoffman
- Cover artist: Honi Werner
- Language: English
- Genre: Fiction
- Publication date: 1995
- Publication place: United States
- Pages: 286
- ISBN: 9780425190371

Practical Magic is a 1995 novel by Alice Hoffman. The book has two prequels The Rules of Magic (2017) and Magic Lessons (2020) and sequel The Book of Magic (2021) also written by Hoffman. The book went on to spawn a media franchise of the same name, which consists of a 1998 film adaption of the same name by Warner Bros., a 2004 television pilot Sudbury, and a 2026 film sequel based on The Book of Magic.

== Plot summary ==
Gillian and Sally Owens were two happy, normal girls – until their parents die in what appears to be a tragic accidental fire. Orphaned and deeply saddened, the girls move in with their two eccentric aunts, Frances and Bridget, in a small town in Massachusetts – the town their mother left so many years before. The aunts raise the girls without discipline or rules, allowing them to drink soda for breakfast and eat candy for dinner.

As the girls began their new lives with their aunts, they found themselves ostracized by the suspicious and superstitious townsfolk, who viewed them as descendants of a long line of powerful witches. The aunts openly practiced their craft, relying on their aptitude for selling love potions, charms, and herbal remedies as their main source of income, despite the townsfolk's hypocritical reliance on their services. Initially, the girls refused to believe in their magical heritage. After witnessing a powerful love spell backfire, resulting in the terrifying, destructive obsession of the recipient, the sisters decided to forego and avoid magic and love entirely, believing both brought inevitable pain.

Following high school graduation, Gillian ran away to California with a boy, seeking escape and distance. Meanwhile, Sally desperately yearned for true love but feared meeting the same fate as her parents, who had died in a fire, too in love to save themselves. Sally soon met the charming Michael. They quickly married and had two daughters, Antonia and Kylie, living happily for three years until Michael suddenly died. Overwhelmed by grief and guilt, Sally became convinced that her family's centuries-old curse surrounding the Owens women had caused his death. She packed up her daughters and moved away to start over, determined to sever ties with the magical world for good.

Years later, trouble followed Gillian back to Sally’s doorstep when she arrived with the dead body of her abusive ex-boyfriend, Jimmy, in the passenger seat of her car. As the sisters reconnected while scrambling to cover up the incident, Sally's daughters began to come into their own womanhood. Kylie, in particular, developed the "Sight," which allowed her to view Jimmy's lingering ghost, growing closer over time, affiliated with a mysterious and threatening patch of flowers that seemed to bloom overnight in their backyard.

== Adaptations ==
=== Film adaptation ===
The book served as the basis for a film adaptation directed by Griffin Dunne. The film was released on October 16, 1998 and stars Sandra Bullock, Nicole Kidman, Dianne Wiest, Stockard Channing, and Aidan Quinn. The film received negative reviews from critics upon its release and was a box office disappointment, grossing $68.3 million worldwide against a $75 million production budget. It later developed a cult following in the years since its release. The film deviates from the book to varying degrees, such as a tonal shift from a dark coming-of-age story to a lighter and more comedic one, ageing up the female leads from teenagers to young adults, expanding upon the role of the two aunts, and taking on a totally different conflict between Gillian and her former love interest Jimmy.

A sequel based on Alice Hoffman's 2021 sequel novel The Book of Magic was confirmed in June 2024 and was released on September 10, 2026, with Bullock, Kidman, Wiest, and Channing reprising their roles.

=== Musical ===
On February 9, 2026, it was confirmed that a Broadway musical based on the book was in development, to be written by series author Alice Hoffman and Peter Duchan, with an original score by Norah Jones and Gregg Wattenberg, and Maria Friedman directing.
