= The Moonlight Healers =

2025 novel by Elizabeth Becker

- Author: Elizabeth Becker
- Language: English
- Genre: Magical realism
- Publisher: Graydon House Books
- Publication date: 1 February 2025
- ISBN: 1038947014
- OCLC: 1492702102

The Moonlight Healers is a magical realism novel written by author Elizabeth Becker. Her debut novel, it follows Louise Winton, who learns that she has magical healing powers when she unintentionally brings her boyfriend back to life shortly after they are involved in a road accident. It is soon revealed to Louise that the powers were inherited through her maternal line and she finds and reads her the journal of her great-grandmother Helene, a nurse in Nazi-occupied France who used her powers to aid people.

== Reception ==
Publishers Weekly recommended it to fans of Heather Webb and Alice Hoffman, stating: "Becker skillfully braids the timelines to create a powerful ode to the strength of those who have dedicated their lives to healing and caregiving work." Cari Dubiel of the Booklist called it "lovely" and "moving". Linda Harris Sittig of the Historical Novels Review "highly recommended" the novel, writing: "The dual narratives complement each other, the characters are authentic, and the plot moves forward with excellent pacing." Mackenzie Manley of the Southern Review of Books called it a "bittersweet, embracing read" and opined that it "presents a warm, contemplative narrative about the power of nurses."
