= At Risk =

At Risk may refer to:

- At Risk (1994 film), an American romantic drama film
- At Risk (2010 film), an American TV movie
- At Risk (book), a 1988 book by Alice Hoffman
- At risk mental state, the clinical presentation of those considered at risk of developing psychosis or schizophrenia
- At-risk students, a term used in the United States to describe a student who requires temporary or ongoing intervention in order to succeed academically
