= Here on Earth =

Here on Earth may refer to:

== Books ==
- Here on Earth (novel), a novel by Alice Hoffman
- Here on Earth. An Argument for Hope, a 2011 anthropological book by Tim Flannery

== Film and television ==
- Here on Earth (film), a film starring Chris Klein and Leelee Sobieski
- Here on Earth (TV series), a Mexican political thriller television series
- Aqui na Terra (Here on Earth), a Portuguese film directed by João Botelho

== Music ==
- Here on Earth (album), a 2020 album by Tim McGraw
- Here on Earth, an album by Adequate Seven
- "Here on Earth", a song by Dierks Bentley from Riser (album), 2014
- "Here on Earth", a song by Prince from One Nite Alone..., 2002
- "Here on Earth", a song by Scarling from Sweet Heart Dealer, 2004

== See also ==
- Here on Earth - Radio Without Borders, a public radio program
