= Anneika Rose =

Scottish actress

- Born: Glasgow, Scotland
- Occupation: Actress

Anneika Rose is an actress of Scottish nationality and Sri Lankan ancestry. She is known for her roles in the Channel 4 series Ackley Bridge (2017) and Deadwater Fell (2020), the BBC series Line of Duty (2020) and Crossfire (2022), Shetland (2021), and Fear (2025).

== Early life ==
Rose has family from Sri Lanka. She was born and grew up in Glasgow, the second oldest of six children. Rose trained at the Royal Scottish Academy of Music and Drama.

== Career ==
Rose has appeared on UK television shows including Shetland, The Midwich Cuckoos, Line of Duty, Deadwater Fell and Ackley Bridge. She also appeared in successful theatre productions of Romeo And Juliet, Behind The Beautiful Forevers and The Empress. Indeed, such was her string of hits in a short space of time The Sunday Post said that her "name on the credits seems to signal a jewel in the television schedules and theatre listings." Rose told the paper "I think I am fortunate, I have to say. I'm drawn to scripts that are gripping. It's a good sign if I start reading a script, and I want to keep reading… All of those TV shows, they all had great scripts, it was the main draw." Rose has also been able to work with a number of high-profile Scottish actors, including David Tennant (Deadwater Fell), Mark Bonnar (Guilt) and Kelly MacDonald (Line of Duty). She also appeared in The Cry which The National called “the best TV drama Scotland has ever produced”.

== Partial filmography ==
Key
†	Denotes films that have not yet been released

Year	Title	Role	Notes
2010	Taggart		2 episodes
2017	Silent Witness		2 episodes
2017	Apple Tree Yard	Dr. Sadiq	
2017	Ackley Bridge	Lila	6 episodes
2017	Electric Dreams	Mary	1 episode
2018	The Cry	Jean-Louise Talbot	2 episodes
2019	Guilt	Nicola	2 episodes
2019	The Feed	Natalie	6 episodes
2020	Deadwater Fell	Nicky	4 episodes
2020	Line of Duty	PC Farida Jatri	9 episodes
2021	Shetland	Maggie	9 episodes
2022	The Midwich Cuckoos	Amrita	3 episodes
2022	Crossfire	Abhi	4 episodes
2023	Payback	Rowena Hayes	
2024	Dept. Q	Sabine Perera	1 episode
2025	Fear		
2026	Marble Hall Murders†		TV series

=== Partial theatre work ===
Dates	Title	Role	Company	Venue	Ref.
October - November 2008 (tour); 27 November 2008 - 24 January 2009	Romeo and Juliet	Juliet	Royal Shakespeare Company	Tour; The Courtyard Theatre, Stratford-upon-Avon	
1–27 June 2009	Much Ado About Nothing	Hero	New Shakespeare Company	Open Air Theatre, London	
22 October - 17 November 2012	A Midsummer Night's Dream	Hermia		Royal Lyceum Theatre	
21–23 June 2013	A Midsummer Night's Dreaming	Hermia	Royal Shakespeare Company		
11 July - 18 October 2015	Richard II	Queen Isabel		Shakespeare's Globe	
2021	Behind the Beautiful Forevers	Meena		National Theatre at Home (Note: Recorded performance)	

=== Video game ===
Year	Title	Role	Notes
2015	Dragon Quest Heroes: The World Tree's Woe and the Blight Below	Isla	Voice
2026	Directive 8020	Pari Simms	Voice
