= Matt Pritchett =

British pocket cartoonist

Matthew Pritchett MBE (born 14 July 1964) is a British cartoonist who has worked on The Daily Telegraph newspaper under the pen name Matt since 1988.

== Early life and education ==
Pritchett's father Oliver Pritchett was a columnist for The Daily Telegraph for several decades; his paternal grandfather was the writer V. S. Pritchett. The screenwriter Georgia Pritchett is his sister.

Pritchett attended a grammar school in south-east London before studying graphics at Saint Martin's School of Art. He started working as a waiter in a pizza restaurant, while drawing cartoons in his spare time. His first cartoon was published in the New Statesman, and he then started drawing cartoons for The Daily Telegraph diary. He had considered becoming a film-cameraman, but gave up after realising he had misunderstood the role.

== Career ==
Following the death of Mark Boxer in 1988, Pritchett was hired by Max Hastings to be The Daily Telegraph's new pocket cartoonist. His first cartoon in this role came the day after the newspaper was printed with a date error, leading them to make a front-page apology; the cartoon caption was, "I hope I have a better Thursday than I did yesterday." His work has also been published in Punch.

== Honours ==
Pritchett won the British Press Awards' "Cartoonist of the Year" in 2000, 2008, 2009, and 2019, and has been a nominee many other times. He won "The Journalists' Charity Award" at the 2014 Press Awards.

He was appointed an MBE in the 2002 New Year Honours "for services to Journalism", and in 2005, Press Gazette inducted him into their Hall of Fame as one of the 40 most influential journalists of the past four decades.

== Personal life ==
Pritchett is married to Pascale Smets, a Belgian former fashion designer. They met whilst studying at Saint Martin's, and have three daughters and a son together, including The Guardian cartoonist Edith Pritchett. His wife's sister, Benedicte, is married to Martin Newland, a former editor of The Daily Telegraph.

== Published works ==
- The Best of Matt, 2004. Orion. 2004.
- Matt - The Best of 2008. Orion. 2008.
