= Lisa Hall (musician) =

English singer

- Born: Lisa Ann Hall
- Origin: Chesterfield, Derbyshire, England
- Genres: Pop; rock; trip hop; electronic
- Occupation: Singer
- Instrument: Vocals
- Website: https://www.lisahall.uk/

Lisa Ann Hall is an English singer from Chesterfield, Derbyshire, England. She was lead singer of a band called lisahall which released an album, Is This Real?, in 1998, and an EP in 2007 titled Connection 17. The song "Is This Real?" was a minor hit and featured in the film, Practical Magic.

== Discography ==
- Is This Real? (1998)
- Connection 17 EP (2007)
- Isn't Life Beautiful (2022)
