= The Ice Queen =

2005 novel by Alice Hoffman

- First edition (US)
- Author: Alice Hoffman
- Language: English
- Genre: Historical Fiction
- Published: 2005
- Publisher: Little, Brown US; Chatto & Windus (UK)
- Publication place: United States
- Media type: Print
- Pages: 224 pages
- ISBN: 0316154385
- Text: The Ice Queen at Wikisource

The Ice Queen is a 2005 novel by Alice Hoffman, published by Little, Brown.

Wishes... burn your tongue the moment they're spoken, and you can never take them back.

— The Ice Queen- Christine M H

== Synopsis ==
Be careful what you wish for. A small-town librarian lives a quiet life without much excitement. One day, she mutters an idle wish and, while standing in her house, is struck by lightning. But instead of ending her life, this cataclysmic event sparks it into a new beginning. She goes in search of Lazarus Jones, a fellow survivor who was struck dead, then simply got up and walked away. Perhaps this stranger who has seen death face to face can teach her to live without fear. When she finds him he is the opposite -- a burning man whose breath can boil water and whose touch scorches.

— , Alice Hoffman The Ice Queen Summary

== Plot summary ==
The Ice Queen is a nameless woman who makes a wish as an eight-year-old child that ruins her life. She grows up cold and unfriendly until, as she stands by her kitchen window, she is struck by a bolt of lightning. She survives but is changed: now it's as if she is made of ice. Also, she can no longer see the color red. She hears of a man called Lazarus Jones, who also survived being struck by lightning, and who is reputed to have a heart and soul made of fire. He came back to life after being dead for 40 minutes. They embark on a turbulent love affair whilst trying to hide their secrets: how one became full of fire and the other became made of ice.
