= Blackbird House =

2004 novel by Alice Hoffman

First edition

Blackbird House is a novel by Alice Hoffman, published by Doubleday in 2004.

== Plot summary ==
Surrounded by fields of sweet peas and fruit vines in rural Massachusetts sits Blackbird House, a haunting house to the women who live in her. A raging storm in 1778 sees John Hadley and his sons lost at sea. From then, the lives of the inhabitants are tangled together, until present day when the history of the house, its ghosts and the tragedies yet to come arrive at a dramatic climax.
