= Is This Real? (lisahall album) =

Studio album by lisahall
- Released: 15 September 1998
- Genre: Pop rock, electronica
- Label: Reprise
- Producer: Nip Heeley; Paul Hopkinson; Steve Ludlam; David Kahne

Is This Real? is the debut album by British band lisahall. It was released by Reprise on 15 September 1998.

== Critical reception ==
Professional ratings
Review scores
Source	Rating
AllMusic	2.5/5 stars
Entertainment Weekly	B

The Santa Fe Reporter praised the album, calling its music "a dark, hook-laden brand of pop-rock, dipped in menace and swirled through a somnambulist, druggy sensibility." AllMusic wrote that when the band "hook onto a killer groove, like they do on the sweetly biting 'Comatose,' their pop aptitude overrides their electronic one with a shimmering enthusiasm that's positively catching." Entertainment Weekly wrote that a couple of songs "merge trip-hop dance grooves and loopy shape-shifting to Hall’s girlishly appealing voice for warm, emotive pop-tronica."

== Track listing ==
No.	Title	Writer(s)	Length
1.	"Comatose"	Hall, Heeley, Hopkinson, Ludlam	3:18
2.	"Connection 17"	Hall, Heeley, Hopkinson, Ludlam	3:52
3.	"Is This Real?"	Hall, Heeley, Hopkinson, Ludlam	4:53
4.	"I Know I Can Do It"	Hall, Heeley, Hopkinson, Ludlam	3:22
5.	"It Takes a Little More"	Hall, Heeley, Hopkinson, Ludlam	3:12
6.	"The Sign"	Hall, Heeley, Hopkinson, Ludlam	4:16
7.	"All I Am"	Hall, Heeley, Hopkinson, Ludlam	3:10
8.	"Chocolate"	Hall, Ludlam	5:34
9.	"Don't Want to Talk About It"	Hall, Heeley, Hopkinson, Ludlam	4:06
10.	"Secret"	Hall, Heeley, Hopkinson, Ludlam	4:34
