= Crossfire (British TV series) =

British thriller television series

- Genre: Thriller
- Created by: Louise Doughty
- Directed by: Tessa Hoffe
- Starring: Keeley Hawes; Josette Simon; Anneika Rose; Daniel Ryan; Vikash Bhai; Hugo Silva; Shalisha James-Davis; Alba Brunet; Ariyon Bakare; Lee Ingleby
- Music by: Nainita Desai
- Country of origin: United Kingdom
- Original language: English
- No. of series: 1
- No. of episodes: 3

Production
- Executive producers: Laurence Bowen; Chris Carey; Louise Doughty; Keeley Hawes; Lucy Richer
- Producer: Alex Mercer
- Cinematography: Laurent Barès
- Editor: Dermot Diskin
- Production companies: Dancing Ledge Productions; Buddy Club Productions; BBC; RTVE

Original release
- Network: BBC One
- Release: 20 September – 22 September 2022

Crossfire is a 2022 British television thriller series, created and written by Louise Doughty (her first original television series). It is about a British family who are caught up in an armed assault on a holiday resort in Spain. It was produced by Dancing Ledge Productions, in association with Buddy Club Productions, for the BBC, with the participation of RTVE. It stars Keeley Hawes, Josette Simon and Anneika Rose, and was broadcast on 20, 21 and 22 September 2022 on BBC One.

== Plot ==
Jo takes her family on holiday to Hotel Barranco Tropical, a resort in the Canary Islands, as her marriage is falling apart. However, she and her family are soon thrust into a battle for survival when gunmen attack the hotel.

== Cast ==
=== Hotel guests ===
- Keeley Hawes as Jo Cross, a security consultant, former police officer and Jason's wife
- Lee Ingleby as Jason Cross, a social worker and Jo's husband
- Daniel Ryan as Ben Cross, Jason's brother, a nurse and Miriam's husband
- Josette Simon as Dr. Miriam Alderton, a GP and Ben's wife
- Vikash Bhai as Chinar Doshi, a businessman and Abhi's husband
- Anneika Rose as Abhilasa 'Abhi' Doshi, Chinar's wife
- Aida Ballmann as hotel guest
- Noah Leggott as Adam Cross, Jo and Jason's son
- Shalisha James-Davis as Amara, Jo's daughter from her first marriage
- Zakiy Jogi as Gatik Doshi, Chinar and Abhi's eldest son
- Arjun Subramaniam as Jaypal Doshi, Chinar and Abhi's middle son
- Viaan Mayur as Sunil 'Suni' Doshi, Chinar and Abhi's youngest son

=== Hotel staff ===
- Hugo Silva as Mateo Rodrigues, the concierge and security manager
- Alba Brunet as Bea Rodrigues, the manager and Mateo's wife
- Marta Fuenar as Pilar, a waitress and Bea's cousin
- Guillermo Campra as Iker, a waiter
- Christian Sánchez as Eusebio
- Gladys Balaguer as Marta, a member of kitchen staff

=== Other ===
- Pol Toro as Gerardo, the lead shooter and Flavio's older brother
- Pol Sanuy as Flavio, one of the shooters and Gerardo's younger brother
- Ariyon Bakare as Paul, a police officer, Jo's ex-husband and Amara's father

== Episode list ==
No.	Title	Directed by	Written by	Original release date	U.K. viewers (millions)
1	"1.1"	Tessa Hoffe	Louise Doughty	20 September 2022	5.10
Jo Cross, a security consultant and former police officer, is on holiday in the Canary Islands with her estranged husband Jason, their children Adam and Kimberly, and her daughter Amara from a previous marriage. They are accompanied by relatives Ben and Miriam, and friends Abhi and Chinar Doshi and their children Gatik, Jaypal and Sunil. At the resort, multiple gunmen break in and start shooting people indiscriminately. Several guests and hotel staff are injured and killed. Chinar flees with Adam, Gatik and Jaypal to a basement. The majority of guests are evacuated, but Ben loses niece Kimberly and Sunil Doshi in the mayhem. Miriam remains to treat injured staff, who lock themselves in the kitchen and are joined by Abhi. Jason stays to find Adam, and Amara hides in the hotel. Jo meets with Mateo, the concierge and security manager, who tells her the Policía Nacional will take 30 minutes to arrive by helicopter. They arm themselves with shotguns from his office. Whilst using Jo's phone, Jason finds evidence of her infidelity, and later makes an enraged call to someone. Chinar fights a gunman, and is killed whilst Gatik, Jaypal and Adam escape. Jo confronts Flavio, one of the gunmen, when she sees him threatening Amara.
2	"1.2"	Tessa Hoffe	Louise Doughty	21 September 2022	4.37
Hotel waiter Iker gives one of the shooters, Flavio, a master key card before the attack. Jo shoots at Flavio, but misses and is rescued by Mateo. The two begin to clear the hotel and evacuate people, with Mateo wanting to kill the shooters also. They reunite with Adam and the Doshi children and evacuate them. Miriam performs a rudimentary needle decompression on Pilar, a waitress who was shot and has pneumothorax. Jo finds Chinar's body, and a flashback reveals they were having an affair. Flavio spares Amara, and it appears he is taking orders from his brother, the second shooter. Jason falls from a balcony trying to escape one of the shooters. Mateo is shot in the stomach by Flavio, and identifies him as a former employee, who along with his brother Gerardo was fired for theft. Iker texts Gerardo the guest's location in the kitchen, and he gains entry, kills several, and takes hostages. Police helicopters arrive, but Jo worries that the shooters will now try and kill as many as possible. She leaves Mateo with a gun in the staff accommodation and reunites with Amara, but they flee to the roof when Flavio sees them and opens fire. Jo prepares to shoot him when he comes through the fire exit.
3	"1.3"	Tessa Hoffe	Louise Doughty	22 September 2022	4.25
A Guardia Civil UEI team raid the hotel. Gerardo lets Iker go, and is later killed when the police breach the kitchen. Jo kills Flavio when he raises his weapon. Everyone is evacuated, but Ben and Amara stay to find Sunil and Kim. Amara finds them. Jo returns to Mateo, and finds Iker packing his belongings. He flees and Jo pursues him, but he kills Ben before being arrested by the Policia Municipal. Back in Leicester, the families attend Chinar's funeral. Jason is revealed to have survived the fall, and is in rehabilitation. He and Jo agree to try and make their marriage work. Jo suffers a PTSD reaction seeing a copy of The Daily Mirror hailing her as a hero. She meets with her ex-husband Paul, expressing guilt over killing Flavio. 18 people are said to have died in the attack. Miriam and Amara discover Jo's affair with Chinar, and confront her where she apologises unconditionally, revealing the two never actually slept together. Jo is given a police commendation from her former force, but accepts it only on behalf of the others who helped during the shooting. Mateo recovers from his injuries, and is seen on the beach with Bea and their children. After careful consideration, Jo decides to re-join the police.

== Reception ==
The series received mixed to negative reviews. Lucy Mangan of The Guardian awarded the first episode two stars out of five, praising the opening but stating, 'If you are suffering from a tension pneumothorax yourself and can't reach the remote control, or if you are a great devotee of the game Who's Marked Next For Death?, it's an OK watch. For the rest of us, there's lots of other stuff to be getting on with, I'll bet.' Anita Singh in The Telegraph also gave it two stars out of five, comparing it to a soap opera. Nick Hilton from The Independent gave the first episode two out of five stars, lambasting the writing but praising Hawes.

James Jackson of The Times gave it three stars.
