= Jericho Ridge =

British action film

- Directed by: Will Gilbey
- Written by: Will Gilbey
- Produced by: Alex Tate; Harvey Ascott; Mark O'Sullivan; Besnik Krapi
- Starring: Nikki Amuka-Bird; Solly McLeod; Zack Morris; Michael Socha; Capital T
- Cinematography: Ruairí O'Brien
- Production companies: DLNQNT; Silver Lining Productions
- Distributed by: DLNQNT
- Release date: 14 July 2023 (Galway)
- Running time: 88 min
- Country: United Kingdom
- Language: English

Jericho Ridge is a 2023 British survival thriller film written and directed by Will Gilbey (in his directorial debut). It stars Nikki Amuka-Bird alongside Michael Socha, Zack Morris and Solly McLeod.

== Synopsis ==
Trapped without support, a small town cop finds her remote Sheriff's Office being targeted by a drug cartel in northern Washington state.

== Cast ==
- Nikki Amuka-Bird as Tabby Temple
- Olivia Chenery as Dakota
- Philipp Christopher as Carter
- Solly McLeod as Deputy Walter Judge
- Zachary Hart as Arnie Boo
- Aidan Kelly as Tap Shannon
- Simon Kunz as Sheriff Eddie Reynolds
- Zack Morris as Monty Temple
- Michael Socha as Earl Macready
- Capital T as Kreshnik
- Alex Tate as Bob Peck
- Pippa Winslow as Pam De Luca

== Production ==
Marking Will Gilbey's feature length directorial debut, the project was announced as starting principal photography in March 2022 with Nikki Amuka-Bird starring. Production was by Silver Lining Productions and DLNQNT with Alex Tate and Harvey Ascott producing with Besnik Krapi and Mark O'Sullivan and Richard Caleel executive producing. Filming had been planned to take place in Canada in March 2020 but was delayed by the COVID-19 pandemic. Ultimately the nine-week shoot took place in and around Pristina, Kosovo and the national park. In March 2022, it was confirmed to be English actor Zack Morris' first feature role.

== Release ==
Brilliant Pictures secured world sales rights as filming wrapped in May 2022.

The film premiered at Galway Film Fleadh on 14 July 2023.

It was initially available to watch in late 2023 on the BET+ streaming platform in the US.

In the UK it received a cinema release on April 25, 2024 before landing on streaming platforms on April 29, 2024.

== Reception ==
Leslie Felperin of The Guardian awarded the movie three stars out of five, writing that “Jericho Ridge has nothing especially profound to say, but it’s an impressive calling card, and hopefully proved a shot in the arm for the Kosovan film industry if nothing else.”
