= Indigo (Hoffman novel) =

2002 novel by Alice Hoffman

- First edition Cover art by Ericka O'Rourke
- Author: Alice Hoffman
- Publisher: Scholastic
- ISBN: 978-0-439-25635-3

Indigo is a novel written by Alice Hoffman, published by Scholastic in 2002.

== Plot ==
Indigo tells of the journey of self discovery that Martha Glimmer, a 13-year old girl who lives in the town of Oak Grove, and her friends "Trout" McGill, age 13, and his brother "Eel", age 11, embark on. The boys are odd outsiders with webbed toes and fingers and a strange obsession with the sea. The three of them long to leave Oak Grove. Martha wants to escape her father's depression after her mother died, and has become too depressed to notice Hildy Swoon has taken over his house and dislikes Martha and the boys. After a large flood went through Oak Grove, the town built a dam, drained the pool and put limits on water usage. The day after the three have left town, massive winds cause a branch to fall and break Martha's arm, causing them to turn back to town and seek help. When they reach the town they find rain has caused the dam to overflow and the town is mostly submerged. While saving a boy that mostly insulted them, the brothers find that webbing on their feet and hands allow them to swim with speed and ease, despite never having learned to swim, so they head to the dam to release the water. When he learns where his sons are headed, Mr. McGill tells how he and Mrs. McGill came to adopt the boys. While on vacation in Ocean City, they went for a walk during a storm, and while seeking shelter they heard a woman crying for help from the ocean. Swimming out to help her, Mr. McGill saw that she had been gouged by a boat propeller, her skin was iridescent, and she had a dark blue tail. While she was very weak she fought to hang onto a rock because she had her two half-human boys with her. After bringing the boys to shore, Mr. McGill swam back to help her, but she had lost her strength and drowned, leaving the boys two rings, one of abalone shell and one of oyster shell. Fearful that the boys would swim off if they went near the water, they always tried to keep the boys away from it. After the brothers destroyed the dam, the town decided not to rebuild it and let the lake refill. The McGills leave town when the school term ends, allowing the boys to be near the ocean. Martha's father comes out of his depression and Hildy Swoon leaves town to live in the mountains with her mother.
