= The Story Sisters =

Book by Alice Hoffman

- First edition
- Author: Alice Hoffman
- Genre: Fiction
- Publisher: Crown Publishing Group
- Publication date: 2009
- Pages: 336
- ISBN: 9780307393869

The Story Sisters is a 2009 novel by Alice Hoffman. It is about three sisters who inhabit a fantasy world and a real world on Long Island and in Manhattan. It has been described as magic realism.

== Plot Summary ==
The Story Sisters are Elizabeth 'Elv', Meg and Claire, fifteen, fourteen and twelve-year-old siblings living with their mother Annie in Long Island. Four years previously their parents divorced; that same year Elv and Claire secretly experienced a traumatic event when a schoolteacher lured Claire into his car. The then-eleven-year-old Elv was able to get Claire to flee but was abducted and sexually abused before escaping. To cope with her trauma, Elv created a fantasy world named Arnelle with its own language, in which she and her sisters are changelings who were stolen by humans as infants and now reside in the cruel mortal world.

Elv's behavior becomes increasingly self-destructive and she begins isolating herself from her family, engaging in promiscuity and drug abuse, and becoming increasingly bitter towards Meg and Annie. After her parents send her to an abusive rehabilitation center, she begins a relationship with Lorry, the older brother of a fellow patient, who she continues seeing after Annie withdraws her from the facility. Some months later, while driving Claire and Meg to school, Elv crashes the car, resulting in Meg's death. Guilt-stricken, Elv runs away to live with Lorry while Claire and Annie grieve.

Annie hires a private detective, Pete, to locate Elv, with who she enters into a romantic relationship. She is later diagnosed with late-stage cancer and dies shortly after Claire's graduation. Claire moves to Paris to live with her loving grandmother Natalia. Withdrawn, antisocial and depressed, she eventually begins to heal when she becomes apprenticed to a jeweler and, with some encouragement, enters a relationship with Philippe, the grandson of Natalia's best friend, Madame Cohen.

Elv and Lorry commit various petty robberies and money scams; Elv is caught, arrested and spends three years in prison, after which she returns to live with Lorry and becomes pregnant. Though he loves Elv, Lorry is unable to quit his own drug addiction and dies before the baby is born. Elv names her daughter Meghann, after her deceased mother and sister, and begins to pursue a healthier lifestyle. Though she and Claire remain estranged, Meghann, nicknamed Mimi, forms an affectionate written correspondence with her aunt. The story finally ends approximately twenty-one years after it began, when Claire invites Mimi and Elv to her and Philippe's wedding, with Madame Cohen and Natalia hopeful for the new generation.
