= The Dead Don't Hurt =

2023 film by Viggo Mortensen

- Theatrical release poster
- Directed by: Viggo Mortensen
- Written by: Viggo Mortensen
- Produced by: Regina Solórzano; Jeremy Thomas; Viggo Mortensen
- Starring: Vicky Krieps; Viggo Mortensen; Solly McLeod; Garret Dillahunt; Colin Morgan; Ray McKinnon; Luke Reilly; Atlas Green; Danny Huston
- Cinematography: Marcel Zyskind
- Edited by: Peder Pedersen
- Music by: Viggo Mortensen
- Production companies: Talipot Studio; Recorded Picture Company; Perceval Pictures
- Distributed by: Shout! Studios (Canada/Mexico); Scanbox Entertainment (Denmark)
- Release dates: September 8, 2023 (TIFF); May 31, 2024 (Canada and Mexico); June 13, 2024 (Denmark)
- Running time: 129 minutes
- Countries: Canada; Denmark; Mexico
- Languages: English; French; Spanish
- Box office: $2 million

The Dead Don't Hurt (French: Jusqu’au bout du monde, Spanish: Hasta el fin del mundo, Danish: Til Verdens Ende) is a 2023 Western film written, directed, and produced by Viggo Mortensen, and starring Mortensen, Vicky Krieps, Solly McLeod, Garret Dillahunt, Colin Morgan, Ray McKinnon, Luke Reilly, Atlas Green, and Danny Huston. Mortensen also composed the score to the film. It is a co-production among Canada, Denmark and Mexico.

The Dead Don't Hurt premiered at the Toronto International Film Festival on September 8, 2023. It had a theatrical release in North America on May 31, 2024, and was released in Denmark on June 13, 2024. The film received generally favourable reviews from critics.

== Plot ==
In 1860s San Francisco, Vivienne Le Coudy, a Métis Franco-Canadian whose father was taken from her by the British when she was a young girl, is aggressively courted by a rich Irish art collector. Unwilling to surrender her independence to his smothering attention, she falls in love with Danish immigrant carpenter Holger Olsen and goes with him to his remote cabin in northern Nevada. Refusing to marry Olsen, she gets a job as a barmaid in the nearby town of Elk Flats, which is dominated by corrupt landowner Alfred Jeffries and his alcoholic son, Weston.

At the outbreak of the Civil War, Olsen, a veteran of the First Schleswig War, decides to join the Union Army because of his abolitionist beliefs; Vivienne is opposed to the decision. His absence leaves room for Weston to try to seduce Vivienne; he eventually corners and violently rapes her. In subsequent scenes, she is shown pregnant and eventually bears a son.

When Olsen returns from the Civil War after several years, the son named Vincent is about five years old. When Vivienne tells Olsen about the rape, he instantly wants to find and murder Weston until she tells him that Weston had been forced to leave town after murdering several people. Olsen, Vivienne, and Vincent live for a while in peace, but she dies after a short illness diagnosed by a doctor as syphilis. Taking Vincent, Olsen hunts down Weston in the wilderness and injures him, leaving him to die. Thereafter Olsen and Vincent ride west until they reach the Pacific Ocean.

== Cast ==
- Vicky Krieps as Vivienne Le Coudy
- Viggo Mortensen as Holger Olsen
- Solly McLeod as Weston Jeffries
- Danny Huston as Rudolph Schiller
- Garret Dillahunt as Alfred Jeffries
- Colin Morgan as Lewis Cartwright
- Ray McKinnon as Judge Blagden
- W. Earl Brown as Alan Kendall
- Atlas Green as Little Vincent
- Luke Reilly as Doctor Reilly
- John Getz as Reverend Simpson
- Nadia Litz as Martha Gilkyson
- Alex Breaux as Ed Wilkins

== Production ==
In October 2022, it was revealed that Mortensen had written and would direct and star in a film alongside Vicky Krieps, Solly McLeod, Danny Huston, Tom Bateman, Lance Henriksen, and W. Earl Brown. Mortensen worked once again with a number of people who collaborated with him in his previous films including DP Marcel Zyskind, production designer Carol Spier, art director Jason Clarke, and costume designer Anne Dixon. The film is a joint production between Talipot Studio, Recorded Picture and Perceval Pictures.

In an interview with The Times, Krieps described working with Mortensen on the film: "In the world of Westerns there were not many women. So that was very tough. Of all men he is very soft and open and very 'there'. But still it reminded me why I like to work with women". Principal photography began in Canada on October 12, 2022, on locations in Ontario and British Columbia, with some filming also taking place in Durango, Mexico. Filming was reported to have wrapped in December 2022.

== Release ==
HanWay Films handles sales for the film worldwide. The Dead Don't Hurt premiered at the Toronto International Film Festival on September 8, 2023. In February 2024, Shout! Studios acquired North American distribution rights to the film. It was released in Canada, Mexico and the United States on May 31, 2024, and in the United Kingdom by Signature Entertainment on June 7, 2024. It was released in Denmark by Scanbox Entertainment on June 13, 2024.

== Reception ==
On the review aggregator website Rotten Tomatoes, 85% of 111 critics' reviews are positive, with an average rating of 7.1/10. The website's consensus reads: "A solid step forward for Viggo Mortensen as a director, The Dead Don't Hurt offers viewers a comfortably old-fashioned Western with a satisfying, character-driven story." Metacritic, which uses a weighted average, assigned the film a score of 70 out of 100, based on 24 critics, indicating "generally favorable" reviews.

Peter Debruge of Variety wrote, "How many partners have attached themselves to someone else's dream, then had to adapt when it proves disappointing? Films rarely frame that experience from the woman's perspective, which makes Mortensen's enlightened approach fairly refreshing, even if Vivienne's independence manifests itself in a way that anyone can sense is bad news".
