= Zack Morris (actor) =

English actor (born 1998)

- Born: 2 October 1998 (age 27); Brentwood, Essex, England
- Occupation: Actor
- Years active: 2007–present

Zack Morris (born 2 October 1998) is an English actor, known for playing Keegan Baker in the BBC soap opera EastEnders and Isaiah Howard in the Disney+/Hulu series Goosebumps (2023).

== Early life and education ==
Originally from Brentwood, Essex, Morris grew up wanting to be an actor. He developed an interest in acting at age six after seeing a local production, and began taking acting classes. Morris attended the D&B Academy of Performing Arts in Bromley, where he trained in singing, dancing and acting. He received a scholarship from television presenter Marvin Humes.

== Career ==
Morris began his professional acting career at the age of nine when he appeared in the musical Joseph and the Amazing Technicolor Dreamcoat. He also appeared in the play Cat on a Hot Tin Roof and in a West End production of Oliver!. Morris made his on-screen debut in 2011 as Sam in the miniseries The Fades, and a year later, he played Kyle in the BBC miniseries One Night. He has also appeared in several advertisements.

In 2017, Morris was cast as Keegan Baker in the BBC soap opera EastEnders. He left the series after five years in March 2022. In 2022, Morris was cast in Will Gilbey's thriller Jericho Ridge. The film premiered at Galway Film Fleadh on 14 July 2023, marking his feature film debut. It was released to U.S. streaming services later that year, before it premiered in cinemas in the UK on 25 April 2024.

In October 2022, Morris was cast in the first series of Disney+'s remake of the horror anthology series Goosebumps. It premiered on 13 October 2023. In 2024, Morris was cast opposite Priyanka Chopra in the Amazon MGM Studios film The Bluff. In 2025, it was reported that Morris joined the cast of the HBO Max medical series, The Pitt. He played the recurring role of patient Jackson Davis in the second series of the streaming series.

== Filmography ==
Year	Title	Role	Notes
2009	Autopilot	Zach	Short film
2011	The Fades	Sam	2 episodes
2012	One Night	Kyle	4 episodes
2017–2022	EastEnders	Keegan Baker	Regular role
2017	Children in Need 2017	Chimney Sweep	EastEnders does the West End
2018	Children in Need 2018	Aladdin	EastEnders does Disney
2020	EastEnders: Secrets from the Square	Himself	Episode: "Tiffany, Keegan and Karen"
2023	Goosebumps	Isaiah	Main role
2023	Jericho Ridge	Monty	Film role
2026	The Pitt	Jackson Davis	Recurring role
2026	The Bluff	Weston	Supporting role

== Awards and nominations ==
Year	Ceremony	Award	Work	Result
2017	British Soap Awards	Best Newcomer	EastEnders	Shortlisted
2017	TV Choice Awards	Best Soap Newcomer	EastEnders	Shortlisted
2017	Black International Film Festival Music Video & Screen Awards	Best Emerging Talent	EastEnders	Won
2018	IARA UK	Best Actor	EastEnders	Shortlisted
2018	IARA UK	Best Young Actor	EastEnders	Won
2018	Inside Soap Awards	Best Actor	EastEnders	Longlisted
2018	Digital Spy Reader Awards	Best Male Actor	EastEnders	Eighth
2019	24th National Television Awards	Serial Drama Performance	EastEnders	Longlisted
2019	British Soap Awards	Best Actor	EastEnders	Shortlisted
2019	British Soap Awards	Best Male Dramatic Performance	EastEnders	Shortlisted
2019	TV Choice Awards	Best Actor	EastEnders	Longlisted
2019	Inside Soap Awards	Best Actor	EastEnders	Shortlisted
2019	Digital Spy Reader Awards	Best Male Soap Actor	EastEnders	Longlisted
2020	25th National Television Awards	Serial Drama Performance	EastEnders	Longlisted
2020	TV Choice Awards	Best Soap Actor	EastEnders	Longlisted
2020	Inside Soap Awards	Best Actor	EastEnders	Longlisted
