= Tom Jones (2023 TV series) =

British television series

- Based on: The History of Tom Jones, A Foundling by Henry Fielding
- Written by: Gwyneth Hughes
- Directed by: Georgia Parris
- Starring: Solly McLeod; Sophie Wilde; Hannah Waddingham
- Composer: Matthew Slater
- Country of origin: United Kingdom
- Original language: English
- No. of series: 1
- No. of episodes: 4

Production
- Executive producers: Gwyneth Hughes; Damien Timmer; James Gandhi; Susanne Simpson; Rebecca Eaton; Polly Hill
- Producer: Benjamin Greenacre
- Production companies: ITV Studios; Mammoth Screen; PBS

Original release
- Network: ITV
- Release: 30 April – 21 May 2023

Tom Jones is an ITV four-part television drama reimagining Henry Fielding's 1749 novel The History of Tom Jones, A Foundling. It is directed by Georgia Parris and adapted by Gwyneth Hughes, with Solly McLeod playing the eponymous hero Tom Jones. The show premiered on PBS in the United States from 30 April 2023.

== Cast ==
- Solly McLeod as Tom Jones
  - Jacobi Jupe as young Tom
- Sophie Wilde as Sophia Western
  - Kimara-Mai Petit as young Sophia
- Janine Duvitski as Mrs Wilkins
- Lucy Fallon as Molly Seagrim
- James Fleet as Squire Allworthy
- Dean Lennox Kelly as Black George Seagrim
- Pearl Mackie as Honour Newton
- Felicity Montagu as Aunt Bridget Allworthy
- James Wilbraham as William Blifil
- Shirley Henderson as Aunt Western
- Alun Armstrong as Squire Western
- Susannah Fielding as Mrs Waters
- Tamzin Merchant as Aunt Harriet
- Julian Rhind-Tutt as Fitzpatrick
- Daniel Rigby as Partridge
- Hannah Waddingham as Lady Bellaston
- Laura Marcus as Susan

== Episodes ==
| No. | Title | Directed by | Written by | Original release date | U.S. viewers (millions) |
|---|---|---|---|---|---|
| 1 | "Episode 1" | Georgia Parris | Gwyneth Hughes | 30 April 2023 | N/A |
Tom Jones falls in love with his charming neighbour, Sophia. But he’s poor and she’s rich, so their families conspire to keep them apart. Can love conquer all?
| 2 | "Episode 2" | Georgia Parris | Gwyneth Hughes | 7 May 2023 | N/A |
Cast out of Paradise Hall, Tom heads to London, with Sophia set to marry Blifil the next day. But that night, she runs away from home in pursuit of Tom, only to find him elsewhere.
| 3 | "Episode 3" | Georgia Parris | Gwyneth Hughes | 14 May 2023 | N/A |
Believing all hope of love with Sophia is lost, Tom is seduced by the charms of a dangerous lady. Meanwhile, Sophia finds that life for young women in London society can be cruel.
| 4 | "Episode 4" | Georgia Parris | Gwyneth Hughes | 21 May 2023 | N/A |
Lady Bellaston takes her revenge on Tom by revealing their affair to a heartbroken Sophia. Have Lady B and Blifil won, or will long-hidden secrets be revealed in time to save Tom?

== Production ==
Production company Masterpiece teamed with ITV and Mammoth Screen for the Gwyneth Hughes adaptation of the Henry Fielding novel in 2021 with Solly McLeod and Sophie Wilde announced in the main roles. Producer and adapter Gwyneth Hughes called the original text "the mother of all romcoms". The miniseries was entirely filmed in Northern Ireland, including Gracehill, Ballymena and at The Regency (Upper Crescent) Belfast. In November 2021 it was announced that Hannah Waddingham had joined the cast.

== Broadcast ==
The series premiered in Denmark on DR TV and DR1 14 and 15 April 2023. It debuted in the US on PBS on 30 April 2023, in four parts on Sundays from 30 April to 21 May 2023 at 9 pm (ET). It debuted on 11 May 2023 on ITVX in the United Kingdom.

== Reception ==
On Rotten Tomatoes, the series holds an approval rating of 67% based on 12 reviews, with an average rating of 5.20/10. The website's critical consensus reads, "Masterpiece Theater's rendition of Tom Jones may not find a novel way of making its titular Lothario more interesting, but his exploits remain good bawdy fun thanks to an appealing ensemble cast." On Metacritic, it has a weighted average score of 62 out of 100 based on 11 reviews, indicating "generally favorable reviews".

Writing for The Daily Telegraph, Anita Singh said: "Tom Jones should be a romp but, for long stretches, it's positively boring. Up-and-coming actor Solly McLeod captures Tom's sweet nature but his chemistry with Sophia (Sophie Wilde) is non-existent, and her performance is outdone in every scene by Pearl Mackie as her maid." Jack Seale of The Guardian wrote: "This adaptation of Henry Fielding's sexy period romance is recast as a tale of a moping wally falling for a dullard – and the spark never lights."

In the Evening Standard, Melanie McDonagh gave the series three out of five stars and wrote: "There's class and sex and money, those failsafe themes of English fiction. And there’s Hannah Waddingham as Lady Bellaston who does snobbish sneers and big hair like no one else in the business...", inspired by the real life of Etheldreda Townshend. So, a nice four part series for a bit of uplift then. The great thing about Tom Jones is that it's not Jane Austen and it's not Dickens. "...So, other than a 1990s BBC series and a rollicking Albert Finney version in 1963 there haven't been umpteen versions done already".
