= Strong on Oaks, Strong on the Causes of Oaks =

Studio album by Michael Nyman
- Released: 1 June 1998
- Recorded: 23 and 24 February 1998
- Genre: Contemporary classical music, minimalist music
- Length: 67:17
- Label: Carlton Classics
- Producer: Matthew Dilley

Michael Nyman chronology
The Suit and the Photograph (1998)	Strong on Oaks, Strong on the Causes of Oaks (1998)	Practical Magic (1998)

Strong on Oaks, Strong on the Causes of Oaks is a 1998 album by the English Sinfonia conducted by Bramwell Tovey. The work, by Michael Nyman, is paired with The Protecting Veil by John Tavener featuring Josephine Knight on the cello. The photography and liner notes indicate that Nyman was directly involved in the album (his 31st), the premiere recording of the work, while Tavener, whose piece, was eleven years old at the time of the recording, has been recorded more than once, is represented by a headshot and stock commentary from Richard Steinetz.

== Strong on Oaks, Strong on the Causes of Oaks ==
Strong on Oaks, Strong on the Causes of Oaks, written in 1997, was commissioned from Nyman by the English Sinfonia. The work he gave them is a five-movement orchestral work based on the String Quartet No. 4, which in turn was based on the solo violin work, by Yamamoto Perpetuo.

The title is derived from the name of the town of Stevenage, where the Sinfonia moved in 1997. The Anglo-Saxon name of the town, "Sithenaece" means "Strong on Oaks." Nyman then took a cue from Tony Blair's campaign slogan (in fact coined by Gordon Brown), "tough on crime, tough on the causes of crime."

He dedicated the work to Simon Jeffes, founder of the Penguin Café Orchestra, and a friend and colleague. Jeffes died on 11 December 1997. Nyman was orchestrating the final page when he learned of his death, and in honour of him, styled 4-note pizzicato chords in the style of Jeffes's ukulele work.

== The Protecting Veil ==
The Protecting Veil is a work composed by John Tavener in 1987 and premiered in 1989, based on his conversion from the Anglican Church to the Eastern Orthodox Church. It is scored for strings with a solo cello, but unlike in a concerto, the cello part is an "endless arch" in the style of music from Byzantium rather than being virtuosic.

== Track listing ==
1. First movement 3'50"
2. Second movement 3'30"
3. Third movement 3'02"
4. Fourth movement 3'05"
5. Fifth movement 2'47"
6. The Protecting Veil 9'35"
7. The Nativity of the Mother of God 6'26"
8. The Annunciation 3'33"
9. The Incarnation 4'32"
10. The Lament of the Mother of God at the Cross 11'41"
11. The Resurrection 3'05"
12. The Dormition 8'18"
13. The Protecting Veil 3'39"

== Personnel ==
- Josephine Knight, cello
- English Sinfonia
- Bramwell Tovey, conductor
- Producer: Matthew Dilley
- Engineer: Dick Lewzey
- 20 bit digital recording and post production by Sound Recording Technology, Cambridge
- Photography: Neil Applegate
- John Tavener photograph: Catherine Manners
- Josephine Knight photograph: Clive Barda
- Liner Notes: English Sinfonia, Michael Nyman, Richard Steinitz
