= Fear (2025 TV series) =

British television series

- Genre: Crime thriller
- Based on: Fear by Dirk Kurbjuweit
- Written by: Mick Ford
- Directed by: Justin Chadwick
- Starring: Martin Compston; Anjli Mohindra; Solly McLeod; James Cosmo
- Country of origin: United Kingdom
- Original language: English
- No. of series: 1
- No. of episodes: 3

Production
- Executive producers: Suzanne Reid; Derek Wax; Justin Chadwick; Mick Ford; Frances Flannery
- Producer: Matt Brown
- Production companies: Wild Mercury; Capricorn Productions

Original release
- Network: Amazon Prime Video
- Release: 4 March 2025

Fear is a 2025 British psychological thriller series from Derek Wax, starring Martin Compston, Anjli Mohindra, Solly McLeod and James Cosmo. It is based on Dirk Kurbjuweit's book of the same name.

A special world premiere screening of the first episode took place at the 2025 Glasgow Film Festival. The three-part limited series premiered on Amazon Prime Video on 4 March 2025.

== Cast ==
- Martin Compston as Martyn
- Anjli Mohindra as Rebecca
- Solly McLeod as Jan
- James Cosmo
- Daniel Portman
- Anneika Rose
- Bhav Joshi
- Maureen Beattie

== Production ==
The three-part series is written by Mick Ford, and directed by Justin Chadwick. It is adapted from the Dirk Kurbjuweit book of the same name. It is produced by Wild Mercury and Capricorn Productions for Amazon Prime Video. It is executive produced by Derek Wax and Frances Flannery for Wild Mercury, Suzanne Reid for Capricorn Productions, Mick Ford and Justin Chadwick, the producer is Matt Brown. The cast was confirmed in March 2024. The show is led by Martin Compston alongside Anjli Mohindra with Solly McLeod, James Cosmo, Maureen Beattie and Anneika Rose.

Filming started in Scotland in March 2024 with Glasgow being the sole filming location for the series. Filming locations include the Park District, Glasgow.
