= Louise Doughty =

English novelist, playwright and journalist

Louise Doughty FRSL
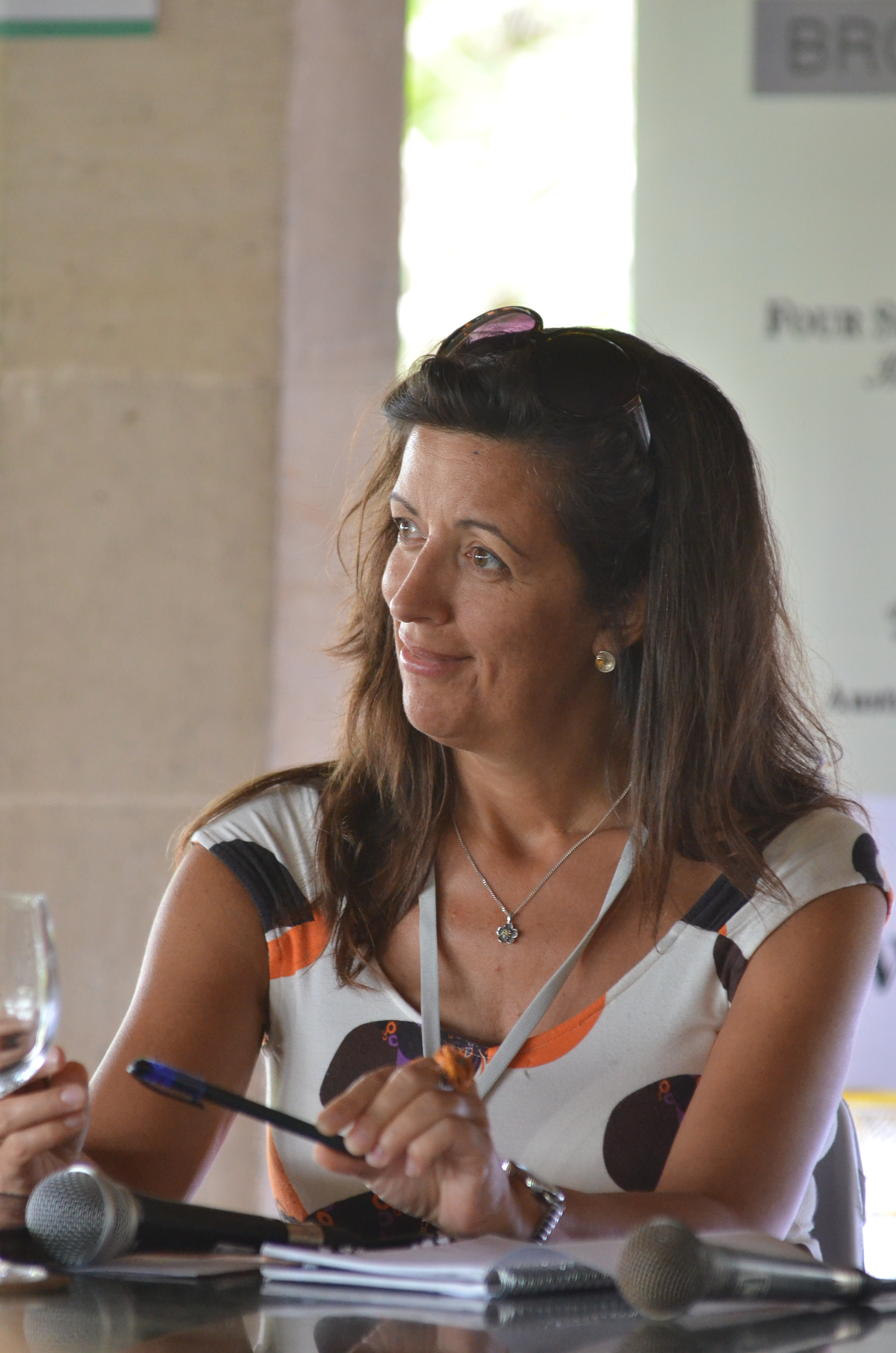
- Ubud Writers & Readers Festival, 2012
- Born: 4 September 1963 (age 63); Melton Mowbray, Leicestershire, England
- Education: Leeds University; University of East Anglia
- Occupations: Novelist, screenwriter, playwright, journalist
- Writing career
- Genre: Thriller
- Website: www.louisedoughty.com

Louise Doughty (born 4 September 1963) is an English novelist and screenwriter. She is best known for her bestselling novels, including Apple Tree Yard. She has also worked as a cultural critic for newspapers and magazines. Her weekly column for The Daily Telegraph was published as A Novel in a Year in 2007. Doughty was the presenter of the BBC Radio 4 programme A Good Read in 1998 to 2001.

== Biography ==
Doughty was born on 4 September 1963 in Melton Mowbray, Leicestershire, and grew up in Oakham, Rutland. She has Roma ancestry. Doughty attended Oakham School and is an alumna of Leeds University and of the University of East Anglia. She has lectured and contributed on creative writing in several countries of the world.

She is the author of nine novels, five plays for radio and a TV mini-series. In 2013, her seventh novel entitled Apple Tree Yard, was published and became a number one bestseller, selling over half a million copies in the UK alone. It has also been translated in thirty territories worldwide. A four-part television adaptation of the same name was broadcast on BBC One in January 2017. The series, which starred Emily Watson in the lead role and adapted by Amanda Coe, received widespread critical acclaim and consolidated viewing figures of 7 million per episode, making it the most-viewed new BBC drama at that time since The Night Manager.

Her most recent book, Platform Seven (2019), was adapted as a four-part drama, by Paula Milne, with Dancing Ledge Productions for ITV in 2023. Her third novel, Honey-Dew, is under option with Chapter One pictures and she is working on a series outline.

In her first original drama for television, Doughty wrote the three-part thriller Crossfire, about a gun attack on a holiday resort, made by Dancing Ledge Productions for BBC One. It stars Keeley Hawes and was broadcast on 20, 21 and 22 September 2022. She is also an executive producer on the series.

Doughty now lives in London.

== Awards and honours ==
Doughty's sixth novel, Whatever You Love, was short-listed for the Costa Book Award for fiction in 2010, and long-listed for the Orange Prize in 2011.

Apple Tree Yard, was selected as a Richard & Judy Book Choice in the spring of 2014. Hilary Mantel commented on the novel, "There can't be a woman alive who hasn't once realised, in a moment of panic, that she's in the wrong place at the wrong time with the wrong man. Louise Doughty... leads her unnerved reader into dark territory. A compelling and bravely written book." Her novel Black Water, (2016) was nominated as one of the New York Times Notable Books of the Year.

Her short story "Fat White Cop with Ginger Eyebrows" was long-listed for the 2015 Sunday Times EFG Private Bank Short Story Award.

Doughty was elected a Fellow of the Royal Society of Literature (FRSL) in 2018. In 2019, she received an honorary doctorate (D.Litt.) from the University of East Anglia.

== Selected works ==
=== Novels ===
- 1995. Crazy Paving. Simon & Schuster Ltd. ISBN 0-671-71879-7
- 1996. Dance with Me (1996). Simon & Schuster Ltd. ISBN 0-684-81652-0
- 1998. Honey-Dew. Simon & Schuster Ltd. ISBN 0-684-82090-0
- 2003. Fires in the Dark. Simon & Schuster Ltd. ISBN 0-7432-2087-0
- 2006. Stone Cradle. Simon & Schuster Ltd. ISBN 0-7432-2089-7
- 2010. Whatever You Love. Faber and Faber. ISBN 978-0-571-25475-0
- 2013. Apple Tree Yard. Faber and Faber. ISBN 978-0-571-29788-7
- 2016. Black Water. Faber and Faber. ISBN 978-0-571-27866-4
- 2019. Platform Seven. Faber and Faber. ISBN 978-0-571-32194-0
- 2023. A Bird in Winter. Faber and Faber. ISBN 978-0-571-32217-6

=== Non-fiction ===
- 2007. A Novel in a Year. Simon & Schuster Ltd. ISBN 978-1-84737-070-9
- 2026. On This Spot Fell One Tear of Love. Phoenix. ISBN 978-1399636155

=== Television ===
Year	Title	Writer	Executive Producer	Creator	Notes
2017	Apple Tree Yard	No	No	No	Associate producer
2022	Crossfire	Yes	Yes	Yes	
2023	Platform Seven	No	Yes	No	

=== Radio Plays ===
Year	Title	Broadcaster	Notes
1991	Maybe	BBC Radio 3	Winner of a Radio Times Drama Award
1994	The Koala Bear Joke	BBC Radio 4	
1998	Nightworkers	BBC Radio 4	
2004	Geronimo!	BBC Radio 4	
2006	The Withered Arm	BBC Radio 4	An adaptation of a story by Thomas Hardy
