= Green Angel =

2003 post-apocalyptic young adult novel by Alice Hoffman

- First edition
- Author: Alice Hoffman
- Illustrator: Matt Mahurin
- Language: English
- Genre: Young adult fiction
- Publisher: Scholastic Press
- Publication date: 2003
- Pages: 127
- ISBN: 978-0439443852
- Followed by: Green Witch

Green Angel is a 2003 post-apocalyptic young adult novel written by Alice Hoffman. It tells the story of a girl's isolation, suffering and gradual recovery after her family dies in a catastrophic fire. It has elements of magic realism and dystopian fiction. It was followed by a sequel, Green Witch, in 2010. A compilation of both novels, Green Heart, was published in 2012.

== Plot summary ==
Green is a quiet and shy 15-year-old girl. She lives with her mother, father, and beautiful younger sister Aurora, in a house on the city's green outskirts. While her sister is wild, charming and impatient, Green is timid and reserved, and has the infinite patience required to tend to the family garden. After mastering the art of tending the garden, she becomes the garden's main caretaker.

One day, her family goes to the city to sell produce, leaving Green behind. There, her family perishes as a result of a conflagration in the city, believed to be done by a secretive, malevolent group of people (also widely assumed to be the events of 9/11). Many people in the city die that day, leaving behind orphans and heartbroken survivors. Ashes from the fire make Green half-blind and singes her hair, forcing her to cut her hair off. Green, deeply sorrowed, changes her appearance and personality and renames herself Ash as she decides to destroy her past to cover the internal pain she is suffering. She tattoos almost her entire body with black roses, vines and bats, continuing to suffer but growing indifferent toward her pain.

Over time as she takes care of herself, through interactions with several kinds of animals that dote on her, a silent boy she calls Diamond, and a kind old neighbor, Green starts to heal from her pain. As she grows, she finds her leaf and stem tattoos turning green and the rosebuds turning red. Finally, on her 16th birthday, she is no longer Ash, as she once used to be, but is once again Green, finding the taste of summer and apples within her. Now, after her recovery, she is strong enough to tell her family's tragic story.

== Characters in "Green Angel" ==
- Green, the protagonist (after the fire and before healing, she refers to herself as Ash

Green has long dark hair, and describes herself as preferring plants and stones to people. She tends to the family garden and she doesn't appreciate herself and knows the medical uses for many plants. To mask her pain, she assumes a new identity as Ash, cutting off her hair, wearing a scarf of thorns, a heavy jacket, and her father's nail-studded boots. She often tattoos herself with needles and ink. Eventually, her entire body is covered in black roses, vines, ravens, etc. When her old neighbor tells her to look closer, she discovers the ink is actually green. The tattoos begin to change color as she grows and heals from her pain, the flowers becoming as they were in her dreams. The half-heart near her own heart turns red at the center.

- Aurora, Green's sister, who visits Green in her dreams. Aurora is Green's opposite, a young girl who was outgoing and cheerful. She laughed and danced and charmed others greatly. Green misses her the most after the fire kills her family. In Green's dreams, Aurora sometimes appears as an older version (about Green's age) of herself, but Green comes to realize Aurora will never be any older. She accepts Aurora's death, and the loss of her family. In Green's dreams, Aurora sometimes wouldn't recognize her (this was only when she became Ash).
- Mother and Father, Green's parents who die in the fire. The story doesn't talk about them in detail as it does with Aurora. Green's father was "honest and strong" and her mother was gentle and "collected blue jay feathers, preferring them to her pearls." Green finds that her mother was going to gift her the pearls on her 16th birthday.
- Old Woman, Green's neighbor who helps Green to heal. Aurora and Green used to steal golden apples from this old woman. Green at first assumes the woman hates her, but in reality, she doesn't. Green begins paying regular visits to the old lady's house. Each time she visits, the woman asks her what her name is. On every occasion except the last, she replies that her name is Ash.
- Diamond, Green's friend who helps Green to heal. Diamond is a quiet boy who comes to Green's house one day. He's one of the few people Green trusts. He almost never speaks, but Green seems to understand him perfectly. While staying with Green, he cleans up her garden, believing it will grow, and paints a portrait of Green. He eventually leaves to search for his mother. She was in the fire, but he doesn't believe she is dead. Green and Diamond share a kiss before he departs. He has the other half of Green's half-heart tattoo.
- Heather Jones, Green's former classmate. Heather used to be Green's classmate, someone whom Green was very jealous of, as she was very pretty. After the terrible fire, Heather joins a group of teens who are determined to forget everything that happened in the fire. These teens drink, steal, and dance around a fire at night. However, it becomes clear Heather can't manage this and continuing declines in appearance and personality every time Green meets her. Green often leaves food out for Heather throughout the book. One day, Green and the other teenagers realize that Heather is missing so they look for her. Later, some of the teenagers say that she drifted into the fire. They all accept that Heather is finally gone, leaving memories behind.
