= Georgia Pritchett =

British producer, screenwriter and author

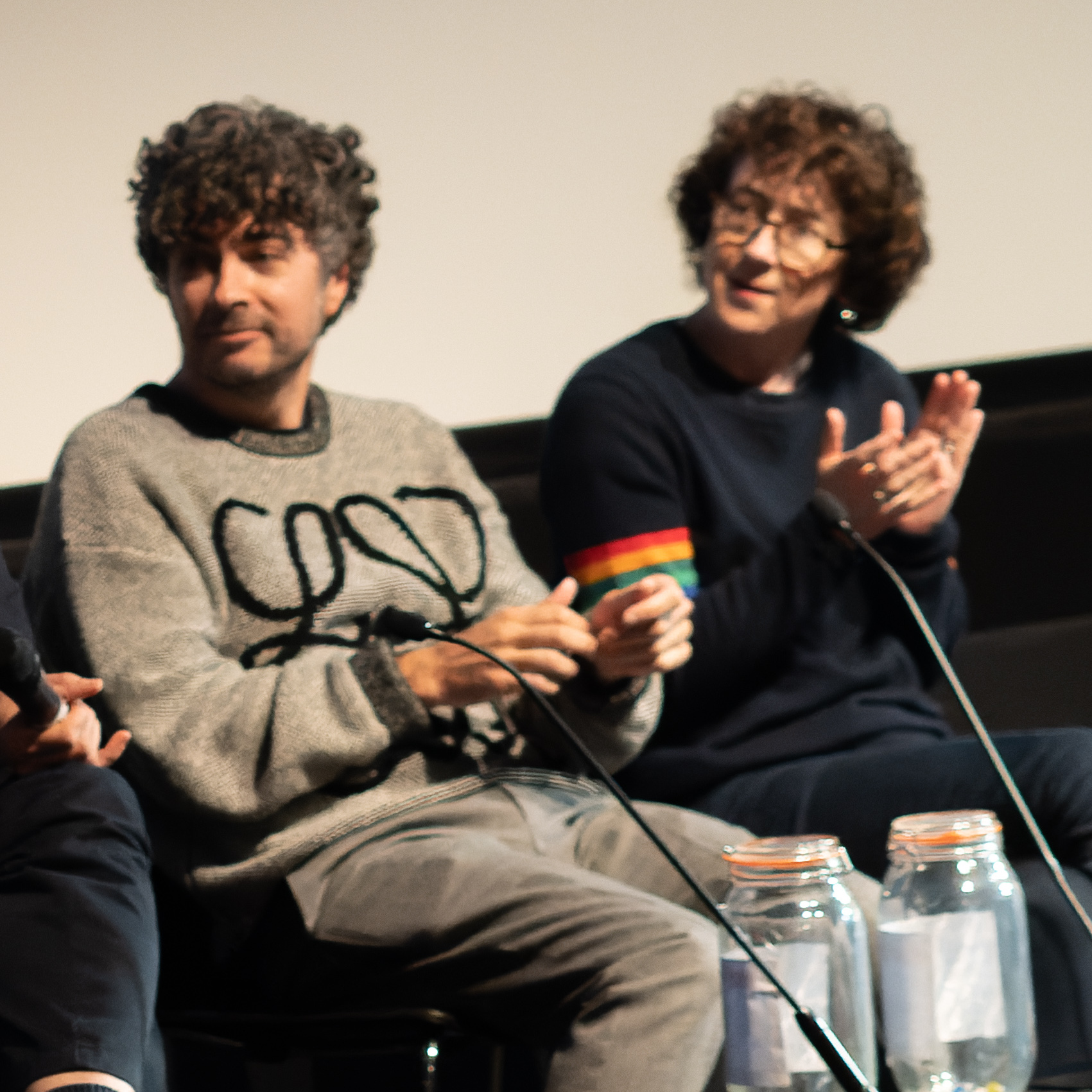
- Pritchett (right) with fellow Succession writer Jon Brown in 2023
- Born: 1968 (age 57–58); London, England
- Occupations: Producer; screenwriter; author
- Years active: 1993–present
- Relatives: Matt Pritchett (brother); V. S. Pritchett (grandfather)

Georgia Pritchett (born 1968) is a British producer, screenwriter, and author. She is best known for her work on Veep and Succession, as well as her book My Mess Is a Bit of a Life: Adventures in Anxiety. The Guardian described Pritchett as "one of the country’s most successful screenwriters".

== Life and career ==
Pritchett was born in London, England in 1968, and raised in South London by her parents, Josephine Haworth, an author, and Oliver Pritchett, a journalist and columnist. Her brother Matt is a cartoonist, and her grandfather is writer and literary critic, V. S. Pritchett.

In an interview with The Hollywood Reporter, Pritchett cited US sitcoms as an early influence in her interest in writing, saying "I was one of those people who would like to watch things again and again, and learn huge chunks and recite them in what is [an] apparently quite irritating way. So I can kind of thought, I love dialogue and I would love to write dialogue and I like the collaborative [nature]." Additionally, Pritchett has cited Phoebe Waller-Bridge, Sharon Horgan, and Michaela Coel as women in the writing industry that she admires, stressing the gender imbalance in the television industry.

In 2021, Pritchett published her memoir, My Mess Is a Bit of a Life: Adventures in Anxiety, about her experiences in screenwriting as someone suffering anxiety.

She joined the British American Project in 2023.

In 2025, it was announced Pritchett was writing the screenplay for Practical Magic 2, a sequel to the 1998 film Practical Magic, currently set for release on September 18, 2026.

== Personal life ==
Pritchett is married to American film and television producer, Katie Pastore.

== Filmography ==
Title	Year	Functioned as			Notes
Title	Year	Writer	Producer	Other	Notes
Thatcherworld	1993	Yes			TV movie, sketch writer
Spitting Image	1993	Yes			1 episode
Small Talk	1994			Yes	Script Associate, Programme Associate, 1 episode
Never Mind the Horrocks	1996	Yes			TV movie
We Know Where You Live	1997	Yes			
An Audience with Ronnie Corbett	1997	Yes			TV special, additional material writer
Ned's Newt	1997–1998	Yes			5 episodes
S Club 7 in Miami	1999	Yes			4 episodes
S Club 7: Back to the 50's	1999	Yes			TV movie
S Club 7 in L.A.	2000	Yes			3 episodes
Joan	2000				Short
Smack the Pony	2000–2001	Yes		Yes	Script Associate - 14 episodes, writer - 11 episodes
High Heels and Low Lifes	2001	Yes			Story Writer
Down to Earth	2001	Yes			2 episodes
Hollywood 7	2001	Yes			4 episodes
Ed Stone Is Dead	2002	Yes			1 episode
Viva S Club	2002	Yes			3 episodes
My Family	2003–2004	Yes			2 episodes
Bognor or Bust	2004			Yes	Program Associate
2DTV	2004	Yes	Yes		Produced - 1 episode Head Writer
The Lenny Henry Show	2004	Yes			1 episode
Barking!	2004			Yes	Creator
Feel the Force	2006	Yes			6 episodes
Trexx and Flipside	2008	Yes			1 episode
Not Going Out	2009	Yes			Additional Material Writer
Life of Riley	2009–2011	Yes		Yes	Creator, writer - 20 episodes
Miranda	2010–2013	Yes			Additional Material writer
Waterloo Road	2011	Yes			1 episode
The Thick of It	2012	Yes			Writer - 1 episode, Additional material writer - 1 episode
Quick Cuts	2013	Yes			Writer - 3 episodes
Veep	2013–2019	Yes	Yes	Yes	Writer - 6 episodes Consulting Producer - 25 episodes Co-executive Producer - 20 episodes Supervising Producer - 12 episodes
PYPO Park Bench Mistakes	2016	Yes			TV movie
Glued	2016	Yes			6 episodes
The Crying Room	2016	Yes			1 episode
Scream Street	2016	Yes			
Tracey Ullman's Show	2016–2018	Yes			15 episodes
Loaded	2017	Yes			2 episodes
Tracey Breaks the News	2017–2018	Yes			4 episodes
Succession	2018–2021	Yes	Yes		Co-Executive Producer - 28 episodes Writer - 5 episodes
Avenue 5	2020		Yes		Supervising Producer - 1 episode Story writer - 2 episodes Teleplay writer - 2 episodes
Shaun the Sheep: Adventures from Mossy Bottom	2020	Yes			1 episode
Miranda: My Such Fun Celebration	2020	Yes			TV movie
Run	2020	Yes	Yes		Consulting Producer - 6 episodes Writer - 1 episode
The Shrink Next Door	2021	Yes	Yes		Executive Producer - 8 episodes Writer - 4 episodes
Practical Magic 2	2026	Yes			

== Awards ==
Emmy Awards:

- 2022 Emmy Award for Outstanding Drama Series for Succession
- 2020 Emmy Award for Outstanding Drama Series for Succession
- 2019 Emmy Award for Outstanding Comedy Series for Veep
- 2017 Emmy Award for Outstanding Comedy Series for Veep
- 2016 Emmy Award for Outstanding Comedy Series for Veep
- 2015 Emmy Award for Outstanding Comedy Series for Veep

Writers Guild of America Awards:

- 2014 Writers Guild of America Award for Television: Comedy Series for Veep
- 2016 Writers Guild of America Award for Television: Comedy Series for Veep
- 2018 Writers Guild of America Award for Television: Comedy Series for Veep
- 2020 Writers Guild of America Award for Television: Dramatic Series for Succession

Writers' Guild of Great Britain Awards:

- 2016 Best TV Situation Comedy for Veep

== Publications ==
- My Mess is a Bit of a Life: Adventures in Anxiety, 2021, HarperOne, ISBN 9780063206380
- Wilf the Mighty Worrier: Saves the World, 2015, Quercus Children’s Books, ISBN 9781848668614
