= Rory McLeod (singer-songwriter) =

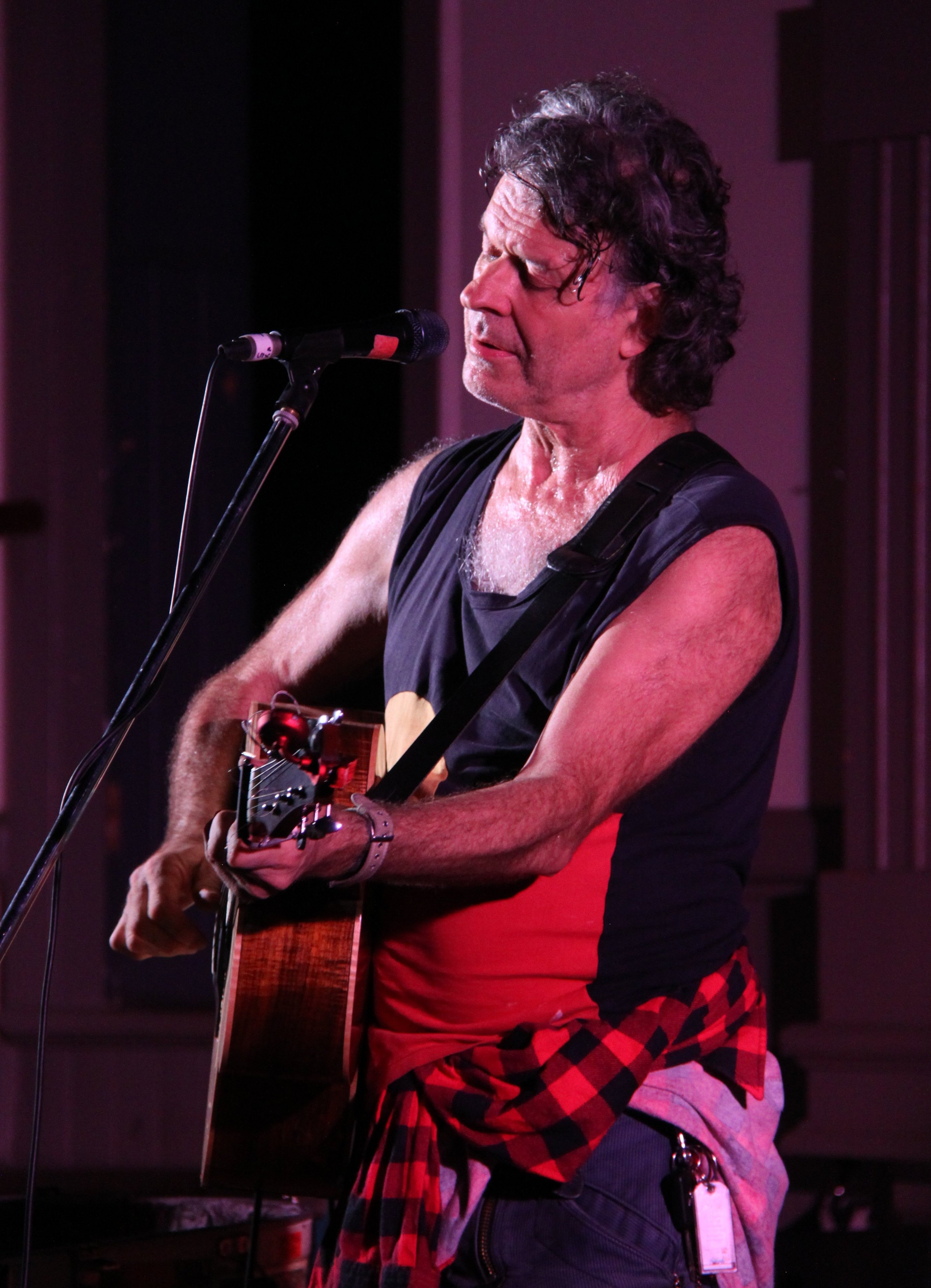
- McLeod performing in Nimbin, Australia, February 2020

Background information
- Born: Rory McLeod; London, England
- Genres: Folk
- Occupations: Musician; songwriter; singer; entertainer
- Instruments: Vocals; guitar; harmonica; trombone; tap shoes; percussion
- Years active: 1975–present
- Labels: Forward Sounds International; Cooking Vinyl; Talkative Music
- Website: www.rorymcleod.com

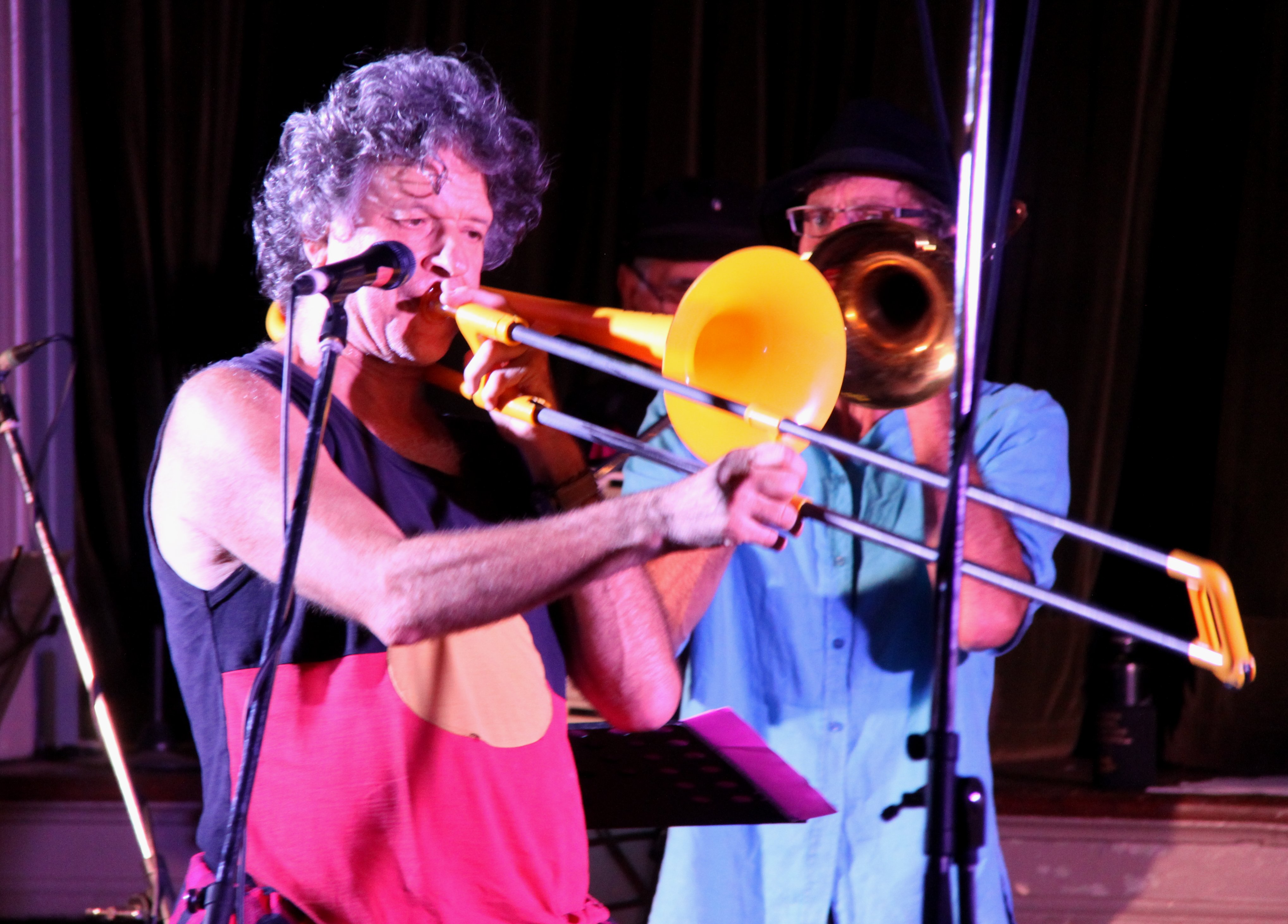
McLeod showing his trombone talents on stage in Nimbin, Australia, February 2020

Rory McLeod (born 1955) is a British folk singer-songwriter from London. He grew up in Camberwell before moving to South Ruislip and later West Kilburn. His career has included being a fire eater and circus clown and his performances include storytelling in the tradition of the traveling minstrel or troubadour, and playing a wide range of instruments including guitar, harmonica, trombone and his personally-made stomp box. WoMAD have said: "With Rory McLeod, you get the music of the world in one suitcase.[...] You can hear flamenco, calypso, blues and Celtic influences in his music, all wrapped together in an inimitable style". He has recorded and toured with (then) fellow Cooking Vinyl artist Michelle Shocked.

He also performed on Puddle Dive, the 1993 album by fellow singer-songwriter, Ani DiFranco. In 1996, McLeod's song Invoking the Spirits, which was inspired by time he spent in Zimbabwe, was a BBC Radio 4 "pick of the week". McLeod played the theme tune for the TV animation series, Creature Comforts. Martin Newell has described McLeod as "a feral folk musician of enormous talent", and writing in The Guardian Robin Denselow called him a "rousing harmonica player and guitarist".

In 2002, McLeod was the winner of the Best Live Act title at the BBC Radio 2 Folk Awards.

McLeod played harmonica on Nizlopi's 2008 album, Make It Happen.

== Discography ==
Albums

- Angry Love (1985)
- Kicking The Sawdust (1986)
- Footsteps and Heartbeats (1989)
- Travelling Home (1992)
- Have Mercy with Henry Heggen, Dick Bird, Brian Barnett and Steve Baker (1993)
- Lullabies for Big Babies (1997)
- Mouth to Mouth (2000)
- Brave Faces (2005)
- Songs for Big Little People (2007)
- Swings and Roundabouts (2010)
- The Glee and the Spark (2016)
- Gusto (2019)
- Tow Lines (2024)

Contributing artist

- Woody Lives! with Bert Jansch, Dick Gaughan, Rab Noakes, Rod Clements and Ray Jackson (1987)
- The Rough Guide to English Roots Music (1998, World Music Network)

== Books ==
In 2020, McLeod published The Rory McLeod Digital Songbook, containing the lyrics of 148 of his songs, and the chords of 34 of these.

== Personal life ==
He is the father of the actor Solly McLeod.
