= Apple Tree Yard =

2017 British television series

- Genre: Psychological thriller
- Created by: Louise Doughty
- Based on: Apple Tree Yard by Louise Doughty
- Written by: Amanda Coe
- Directed by: Jessica Hobbs
- Starring: Emily Watson; Ben Chaplin; Mark Bonnar; Steven Elder; Susan Lynch; Kezia Burrows
- Composer: Halfdan E
- Country of origin: United Kingdom
- Original language: English
- No. of series: 1
- No. of episodes: 4

Production
- Executive producers: Amanda Coe; Manda Levin; Lucy Richer
- Producer: Chris Carey
- Cinematography: Matt Gray BSC
- Running time: 60 minutes
- Production company: Kudos Film & Television

Original release
- Network: BBC One
- Release: 22 January – 6 February 2017

Apple Tree Yard is a British television psychological thriller, adapted from the 2013 novel of the same name by Louise Doughty. The four-part series was commissioned in 2016 and the first episode had its premiere on BBC One on 22 January 2017. Emily Watson stars as the novel's original lead, Yvonne Carmichael, with Ben Chaplin portraying the role of her lover, Mark Costley. Apple Tree Yard follows the story of Carmichael, a conflicted, moderately unhappily-married fifty-something scientist, who begins a covert yet flagrant affair with Costley whilst completely unaware of his background.

== Cast ==
- Emily Watson as Yvonne Carmichael
- Ben Chaplin as Mark Costley
- Mark Bonnar as Gary Carmichael
- Steven Elder as George Selway
- Kezia Burrows as Kate Costley
- Susan Lynch as Susannah
- Franc Ashman as Liz
- Laure Stockley as Rosa
- Olivia Vinall as Carrie
- Assad Zaman as Sathnam
- Robin Morrissey as Jamie
- Jack Hamilton as Adam
- Grace Carey as Maddie
- Beth Chalmers as Sally
- Jim Creighton as Jake
- Alexis Conran as Harry
- Susannah Doyle as Marcia
- Darren Morfitt as Kevin
- Rhashan Stone as Robert
- Frances Tomelty as Price
- Denise Gough as DS Johns
- Lydia Leonard as Bonnard

== Plot ==
After giving a presentation in the House of Commons, Yvonne Carmichael (Watson) meets a mysterious man (Chaplin), who charms her by offering her a tour of the locked Secret Chapel of the Commons. They are attracted to each other and have sex in the historic former broom cupboard. Afterwards, Yvonne begins secretly to compose fantasy letters playing out a relationship with the stranger, Mr. X. The next day, Yvonne tracks Mr. X to a café opposite the Commons, inviting him for coffee. After engaging in sex in the café toilets, they agree to an illicit affair fueled by the thrill of engaging in sexual acts, at times in public places. Yvonne becomes aware that her lover is unwilling to reveal his true identity, but begins to thrive on their shared secret. One night, after meeting with Mr. X in Apple Tree Yard, Yvonne attends a party for one of her colleagues. There, she is approached by a colleague, George (Elder), who reveals that he has harboured secret feelings towards her for some time. When she rejects his advances, George brutally rapes her.

Traumatised from the attack, Yvonne is forced to take time away from work. She slowly begins to confide in Mr. X, who advises her to speak to a rape expert before she decides whether to report the incident to the police. She decides against doing so, but also breaks off the affair. Yvonne tries to pluck up the courage to face her colleagues, but realises that she cannot get the image of George out of her head. She later makes the decision to resign from her job and focus more on her personal life. When she discovers that her husband Gary has spent the weekend away in bed with his intern, Yvonne abandons the idea of retirement and decides to reignite her affair with Mr. X. However, she begins to notice that George is stalking her. Yvonne is confronted by George in a local shop, causing her to accept Mr. X's offer to "resolve" the problem, expecting him to intimidate George by beating him up. They drive to George's house where, with Yvonne staying in the car, Mr. X goes inside. When he returns, looking anxious, she drives him away and they eventually part company.

Shortly afterwards, Yvonne and Mr. X, named by officials as Mark Costley, are arrested and charged with George's murder. During the ensuing trial process, Yvonne believes Mark will protect her by not revealing their affair. But when expert evidence in his favour is undermined by the prosecutor, Mark allows his barrister to disclose their affair whilst cross-examining Yvonne, and she is shown to be lying under oath. However, Yvonne's powerful testimony about her rape gains the jury's sympathy, and she is found not guilty of the killing — though she receives a suspended sentence for perjury. Mark is found guilty of manslaughter on the grounds of diminished responsibility. Yvonne subsequently visits him in prison, where she recalls a moment when she asked Mark to kill George, and to smash his face in. She says to Mark that she realises he has a personality disorder which means he took her request more literally than she intended.

== Production ==
Regarding the rape scene involving Emily Watson and Steven Elder in the first episode, director Jessica Hobbs commented that the scene was "well researched" and reflected on testimony made by several real victims in order to make the scene as accurate as possible. Watson commented; "It was an incredibly hard day for everyone. We wanted it to be very sudden and very real. The people we spoke to described it as an out-of-body experience and so we tried to reflect that." She also noted that having worked closely with Chaplin in the past, it made filming their consensual sex scenes easier: "We've known each other a long time, and we didn't want to fumble about, waiting for someone to shout 'Cut!', which usually happens. We plotted and planned every detail. We wanted it to be realistic – what would it be like in that situation, in a cupboard with a complete stranger? Which was great. I'd never laughed so much and it felt... empowering!"

However, the rape scene was heavily criticised by several victim support organisations, with Rape Crisis England and Wales spokeswoman Katie Russell branding the scene "harrowing". Apple Tree Yard was produced by Kudos Film & Television (production company).

== Episodes ==
No.	Title	Directed by	Written by	Original release date	UK viewers (millions)
1	"Episode 1"	Jessica Hobbs	Amanda Coe	22 January 2017	8.80
Yvonne Carmichael seems to have it all - a respected career, a beautiful home and family. However, nothing is ever as it appears, and when she receives an unexpected proposition from an enigmatic stranger, she is shocked by the passion he awakens in her. But gradually she begins to realise that there is much more to her lover than meets the eye, and she could be playing a very dangerous game indeed.
2	"Episode 2"	Jessica Hobbs	Amanda Coe	29 January 2017	8.08
In the aftermath of what has happened, a devastated Yvonne shuts down. She feels unable to talk to the police or her husband, but as a campaign of terror is mounted against her, she is pushed to her limits and turns to her former lover, Costley, for advice. They meet for one last time and share a passionate afternoon together, before Costley takes control of the situation and Yvonne is plunged from one nightmare into another.
3	"Episode 3"	Jessica Hobbs	Amanda Coe	5 February 2017	8.12
Yvonne's life is turned upside down yet again, when she is ripped away from her family and arrested for murder. In shock, Yvonne denies everything, but the police are convinced that she and Costley colluded in cold blood. Their trial begins and very quickly Yvonne realises that everything she thought she knew about her lover was a lie. And now he's all that's standing between her and a prison sentence.
4	"Episode 4"	Jessica Hobbs	Amanda Coe	6 February 2017	7.33
What starts out as a simple, reckless mid-life affair between a genetic scientist named Yvonne and a Westminster paper pusher takes an intriguing turn; then suddenly gets very dark indeed.

== Home media release ==
The four-part series was released on DVD and Blu-ray on 20 February 2017.

== Popular culture ==
Some fans of the BBC show Sherlock, a show featuring mystery and misdirection, speculated and theorised that Apple Tree Yard was a ruse for a secret additional episode of the show's fourth series. This was speculated as part of the Johnlock conspiracy theory in the Sherlock fandom. The reasons attributed included that it was replacing Sherlock in the timeslot, and starred Emily Watson, who shares a surname with the fictional character John Watson. This was speculative and never addressed by the creators of Apple Tree Yard.

== Accolades ==
Year	Award	Category	Nomination	Result
2018	46th International Emmy Awards	Best Performance by an Actress	Emily Watson	Nominated
