= Here on Earth (novel) =

1997 book by Alice Hoffman

- First edition (US)
- Author: Alice Hoffman
- Language: English
- Genre: Novel
- Publisher: Putnam (US); Chatto and Windus (UK)
- Publication date: October 2, 1997
- Publication place: United States
- Media type: Print (hardback & paperback)
- Pages: 272 pp (first edition, paperback)
- ISBN: 0-7011-6490-5 (first edition, paperback)

Here on Earth is a 1997 novel by Alice Hoffman. The book was chosen as an Oprah's Book Club selection.

The plot of Here on Earth involves a woman named March Murray, who returns with her teenage daughter to the Massachusetts town where she grew up. The story and characters are inspired by the 1847 Emily Brontë novel Wuthering Heights. After returning to the town that she grew up in, March finds herself reunited with the boy she fell in love with years before, Hollis. This dark and twisted tale tells of the capabilities of love and how far one is willing to go for it. "For in heaven and in our dreams, love is simple and glorious. But it is something altogether different here on earth..."
