= At Risk (book) =

1988 novel by Alice Hoffman

- First edition
- Author: Alice Hoffman
- Language: English
- Subject: AIDS
- Genre: Romance
- Published: 1988 (G. P. Putnam's Sons)
- Publication place: United States
- Media type: Hardback, Softcover
- Pages: 219
- ISBN: 9785552268344

At Risk is a 1988 book by Alice Hoffman about Amanda, an 11-year-old girl who contracts HIV from a blood transfusion.

== Characters ==
- Amanda Farrell
- Polly - Amanda's mother
- Ivan - Amanda's father
- Charlie - Amanda's brother
- Jessie Eagan - Amanda's best friend
- Sevrin - Charlie's best friend
- Laurel Smith - medium, friend to Amamda
- Linda Gleason - Principal of the Cheshire School

== Plot ==
Amanda lives with a typical suburban family in the town of Morrow, Massachusetts until she comes down with a fever and a blood test for HIV returns as positive. She contracted it from an unscreened blood transfusion during surgery, 5 years before. Her world is turned upside down. As the news spreads, other parents, fearful of their own children catching the disease, cut off contact with the family. Fear spreads among her peers, who are uneducated as to the nature of sex and believe that AIDS can be spread by skin contact or using the same toilet seat. Her principal decides to counter this by giving the whole school a class-by-class sex education talk. Amanda eventually becomes weaker and weaker; she has to give up gymnastics because of this and because of parental fears that using the same equipment could spread the virus to her teammates. She becomes bitter and disillusioned, becoming friends with Laurel, a medium. She decides to have her braces removed, and her father locates a pediatric orthodontist who will see an AIDS patient. While Amanda's death is portrayed to be inevitable, the novel concludes with an open ending - the special friendship between Charlie and Sevrin.

== Setting ==
This book is set in the contemporary 1980s, a time when little was publicly known about HIV/AIDS or how it was spread.

== Reaction ==
Reviews of the novel were positive, and it was a Main Selection of the Book of the Month Club. However, it attracted controversy and was referred to as "that AIDS novel" in publishing circles.

In October 1987, 20th Century Fox pre-empted the rights to adapt the novel for film, with Hoffman herself attached as the screenwriter. The project eventually moved to Orion Pictures, with Scott Rudin producing. Jonathan Demme was hired as director, prompting Rudin's departure from the project; Demme brought the project to screenwriter Ron Nyswaner's notice, whose nephew Kevin had been recently diagnosed with, and would subsequently succumb to, HIV/AIDS. Although initially reported to be a co-screenwriter with Hoffman, Nyswaner extensively researched newspaper clippings and articles on the subject, ultimately drafting an original screenplay that deviated significantly from Hoffman's novel and would form the basis for the film Philadelphia.
