= Solly McLeod =

British actor

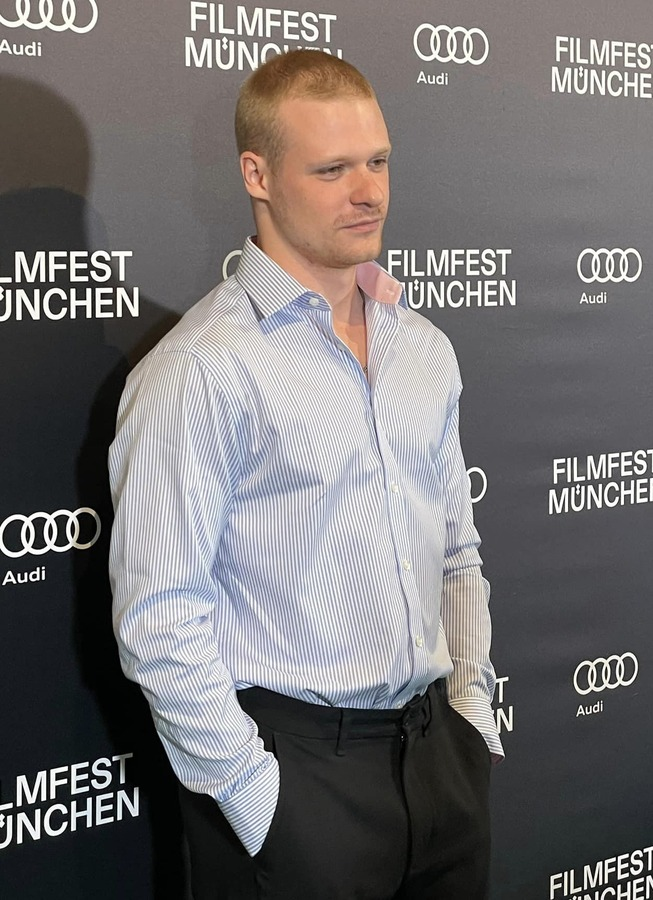
- McLeod in 2024
- Born: 10 February 2000 (age 26); Scotland
- Occupation: Actor
- Years active: 2021–present
- Notable work: Tom Jones; The Dead Don't Hurt
- Father: Rory McLeod

Solly McLeod (born 10 February 2000) is a Scottish actor. On television, he is known for his roles in the ITVX drama Tom Jones (2023), the Amazon Prime series Fear (2025) and the Apple TV series Star City (2026). His films include Jericho Ridge, The Dead Don't Hurt (both 2023), Last Swim (2024), and Practical Magic 2 (2026).

== Early and personal life ==
The son of musicians Aimée Leonard and Rory McLeod, Solly grew up in Orkney before moving to London aged ten, when his parents split up. He attended the Unseen drama school in London.

== Career ==
From April 2021 onwards, McLeod filmed four projects back-to-back with only one day to rest between each. He was in the Sky television series The Rising and HBO's House of the Dragon before spending three months playing the eponymous hero in Tom Jones and then filming the independent survival thriller Jericho Ridge in Kosovo. In Tom Jones, McLeod stars alongside Sophie Wilde and Hannah Waddingham. McLeod had previously had a role in Outlander.

He appeared in the Viggo Mortensen Western film The Dead Don't Hurt. He has been cast in an upcoming project entitled Beach Boys. In December 2021, McLeod portrayed a World War 1 soldier in the music video for Minute Taker's song "Lead You Home".

In 2025, McLeod could be seen playing the troubled neighbour Jan opposite Martin Compston in Amazon Prime Video psychological thriller series Fear. That year, he was cast in the For All Mankind spin-off series Star City and the films Practical Magic 2 and Anxious People, alongside Angelina Jolie and Aimee Lou Wood.

== Filmography ==
=== Film ===
| Year | Title | Role | Notes |
|---|---|---|---|
| 2021 | Boxing Day | Bellman | |
| 2021 | Birthday | Mos | Short film |
| 2021 | Maximus | Max | Short film |
| 2022 | I Feel Fine | Ryan | |
| 2022 | Boy in the Corner | Caleb | |
| 2023 | Jericho Ridge | Deputy Walter Judge | |
| 2023 | The Dead Don't Hurt | Weston Jeffries | |
| 2024 | Last Swim | Shea | |
| 2024 | William Tell | Melchtal | |
| 2026 | Practical Magic 2 | Thomas Lockland | |
| TBA | Anxious People | TBA | Post-production |

=== Television ===
| Year | Title | Role | Notes |
|---|---|---|---|
| 2022 | Outlander | Private Lambie | Episode: "Echoes" |
| 2022 | The Rising | Joseph Wyatt | 7 episodes |
| 2022 | House of the Dragon | Ser Joffrey Lonmouth | Episodes: "Second of His Name" and "We Light the Way" |
| 2023 | Tom Jones | Tom Jones | 4 episodes |
| 2025 | Fear | Jan | Main Role |
| 2026 | Star City | Sasha Polivanov | Main role |
| 2026 | Careless | Robbie | |
| TBA | Prisoner | | Series 2 |
