= Practical Magic =

1998 film by Griffin Dunne

- Theatrical release poster
- Directed by: Griffin Dunne
- Screenplay by: Robin Swicord; Akiva Goldsman; Adam Brooks
- Based on: Practical Magic by Alice Hoffman
- Produced by: Denise Di Novi
- Starring: Sandra Bullock; Nicole Kidman; Dianne Wiest; Stockard Channing; Aidan Quinn
- Cinematography: Andrew Dunn
- Edited by: Elizabeth Kling
- Music by: Alan Silvestri
- Production companies: Fortis Films; Di Novi Pictures; Village Roadshow Pictures
- Distributed by: Warner Bros.
- Release date: October 16, 1998
- Running time: 104 minutes
- Country: United States
- Language: English
- Budget: $60–75 million
- Box office: $94.4 million

Practical Magic is a 1998 American fantasy and romantic comedy film based on the 1995 novel by Alice Hoffman. The film was directed by Griffin Dunne and stars Sandra Bullock, Nicole Kidman, Dianne Wiest, Stockard Channing, and Aidan Quinn. Bullock and Kidman play sisters Sally and Gillian Owens, descended from a long line of witches. Raised by their aunts after their parents' death from a family curse, the sisters are taught the uses of practical magic as they grow up. Years later, they must use their magic to destroy the evil spirit of Gillian's abusive boyfriend before it kills them.

Practical Magic was released by Warner Bros. on October 16, 1998, and grossed $94.4 million worldwide against a production budget of $60–75 million. The film received poor reviews from critics and has since gained a cult following. A sequel, Practical Magic 2, was released on September 10, 2026.

== Plot ==
In Massachusetts, United States, the Owens family have been persecuted for over three centuries because their ancestor Maria Owens survived an attempted execution for witchcraft. Heartbroken when the father of her unborn child left her banished on an offshore island, Maria cast a spell to prevent herself from ever falling in love again. The spell developed into a curse upon Maria's descendants, dooming any man an Owens woman loves.

In the present, Sally and Gillian Owens are taken in by their aunts Frances and Jet after their parents succumb to the Owens curse. As children, Sally and Gillian are frequently ridiculed by the town's schoolchildren. Upon witnessing their aunts cast a love spell for a woman obsessed with her beloved, Sally casts a spell on herself to ensure she will only fall in love with a man who possesses certain seemingly impossible traits, with the intention of never falling in love. Witnessing the same incident, Gillian cannot wait to fall in love. As teenagers, Gillian elopes with her boyfriend and leaves for Los Angeles. Before she departs, she and Sally use a blood spell to swear to always be faithful to one another, grow old together, and die at the same time.

Gillian spends the next decade moving from relationship to relationship across the country, while back in Massachusetts, Sally meets and marries a local named Michael. They have two daughters, Kylie and Antonia. After a truck fatally hits Michael, Sally and her girls move in with the aunts. Learning that they secretly cast a love spell on her so that she could marry and be happy, Sally vows that the aunts will never teach her daughters magic.

Gillian tells Sally her involvement with a man named Jimmy Angelov, a powerful presence whom she often sedates with small amounts of belladonna. Gillian eventually phones Sally and asks her to come get her. Soon after Sally arrives to rescue her now abused sister, Angelov takes them hostage in his car. Sally puts belladonna into Jimmy's tequila to knock him unconscious, but inadvertently kills him. The sisters take Jimmy's body back to the aunts' house, where they resurrect him with a forbidden spell, but he begins to choke Gillian again and Sally kills him for the second time. The sisters bury Angelov's remains in the garden. Sally, Gillian, and the aunts have a midnight drinking session in which Jimmy's tequila seems to be influencing them to turn against each other; the aunts leave home the following morning, leaving a message to the sisters to "clean up their own mess".

State investigator Gary Hallett arrives from Tucson, Arizona, in search of Jimmy, who is revealed to be a serial killer. Gillian attempts to separate them with a potion, but Kylie and Antonia realize he is the man from Sally's childhood spell and they dispose of the pancake syrup containing the potion. After Gillian and Sally fight, a distraught Sally confesses to Gary, only to discover he is the impossible man from her spell. Unable to deny their attraction, the two kiss, which makes Sally ultimately stop and flee, and then runs towards her home knowing that Gillian is in trouble.

Arriving, Sally realizes that Jimmy's spirit has entered Gillian's body. Gary arrives and witnesses Jimmy's spirit materialize before him and, after Jimmy attacks him, uses his silver badge to thwart Angelov's spirit from possessing him. Sally tells Gary he is there because of her spell, the feelings they have for each other are not real, and the family curse will kill him if they pursue a relationship. Gary replies that curses only work if one believes in them and that he wished for her too, and returns to Tucson.

Jimmy uses Gillian again in an attempt to kill Sally before Frances and Jet return. Realizing she must embrace magic to save her sister, Sally asks the local townswomen to form a coven and exorcise Jimmy's spirit. They exorcise Angelov's spirit and permanently exile him, and hope that this might also mean the end of the Owens curse.

Gary clears the sisters of any suspicion in Jimmy's case and returns to Massachusetts to be with Sally. Sally chooses love with Gary despite the risks of an uncertain future. The townsfolk finally welcome the Owens women into the community, as witches, and witness the family's annual Halloween tradition of flying down from the roof.

== Cast ==
- Sandra Bullock as Sally Owens, a witch who becomes widowed
  - Camilla Belle as young Sally Owens
- Nicole Kidman as Gillian Owens, Sally's free-spirited sister
  - Lora Anne Criswell as young Gillian Owens
- Stockard Channing as Frances, Sally and Gillian's aunt
- Dianne Wiest as Jet, Sally and Gillian's aunt
- Goran Visnjic as Jimmy Angelov, Gillian's lover
- Aidan Quinn as Officer Gary Hallet, an investigator
- Evan Rachel Wood as Kylie Owens, Sally's elder daughter
- Alexandra Artrip as Antonia Owens, Sally's younger daughter
- Mark Feuerstein as Michael Bailey, Sally's husband, and Kylie and Antonia's father
- Caprice Benedetti as Maria Owens, the first witch in the Owens family
- Margo Martindale as Linda Bennett, another friend of Sally's, who also works at her shop
- Chloe Webb as Carla, Sally's good friend
- Martha Gehman as Patty, one of the town women who responds to Sally's call for help
- Lucinda Jenney as Sara, one of the town women
- Mary Gross as Debbie
- Peter Shaw as Jack, Sally and Gillian's father
- Caralyn Kozlowski as Regina, Sally and Gillian's mother

== Production ==
Practical Magic was filmed in part on an artificial set in California. Because the film's producers decided the house was a big part of the depiction of the Owens culture, a house to accurately represent that vision was built on San Juan Island in the state of Washington. While much of the set from California was brought to that location and placed inside the house, it took nearly a year to perfect the image of the house and the interior. The house, actually only a shell with nothing inside, was built only for this filming and was torn down after filming was completed. The small town scenes were filmed in downtown Coupeville, Washington, a Victorian-era seaside port town located on the south side of Penn Cove on Whidbey Island. Nicole Kidman's work on Practical Magic and her ex-husband Tom Cruise's work on Mission: Impossible 2 were respectively delayed due to production of Eyes Wide Shut taking much longer than expected.

The film was originally set up at Turner Pictures, who purchased the rights in 1994 under the supervision of president of production Amy Pascal, which was then merged into Warner Bros. in 1996.

The film's production design was led by Robin Standefer and Stephen Alesch of the design studio Roman and Williams. They created the film’s richly detailed sets, including the Owens family home, and designed many of the props by hand. According to Standefer and Alesch, they also designed the film’s distinctive spellbook prop, which features original hand-drawn illustrations by Alesch. Standefer has stated, “Stephen and I devoted ourselves to that. We made every little thing in the film, down to the tincture jars and pressed flowers,” adding that Alesch “did incredible etchings of plants that you can see all around the dining room.”

Director Griffin Dunne said he originally had a darker vision for the film. The scene with Sally and Gilly inserting needles into Jimmy was supposed to be much more disturbing and the domestic violence plot line was more intense, but the studio cut the darker material. He expressed interest in a director's cut.

According to Sandra Bullock in the DVD commentary, while filming the scene where the Owens women are drunk and slinging insults, the actresses actually got drunk on very bad tequila brought by Kidman.

The cast further stated in the film's commentary that they felt supernatural elements of the house started to affect them. Both the cast and crew claimed they heard supernatural noises while filming the coven scene at the end of the film. For the final scene with all of the townspeople at the Owens home, the entire population of the town where filming took place was invited to show up in costume and appear as townsfolk.

== Music ==
Practical Magic: Music from the Motion Picture

Soundtrack album by various artists
- Released: October 6, 1998
- Recorded: August 15–16, 1998
- Studios: Abbey Road, London (Michael Nyman tracks)
- Genres: Soundtrack; pop; minimalism; orchestral
- Length: 56:58 (Nyman pressing); 51:46 (Silvestri pressing)
- Labels: Reprise; WEA
- Producers: Danny Bramson; Sandra Bullock

Michael Nyman chronology
Strong on Oaks, Strong on the Causes of Oaks (1998)	Practical Magic: Music from the Motion Picture (1998)	Ravenous (1999)

Alan Silvestri chronology
The Parent Trap (1998)	Practical Magic (1998)	Stuart Little (1999)

Composer Michael Nyman's score for the film was abruptly replaced with music by Alan Silvestri for the theatrical release. This last-minute change resulted in the release of two soundtracks, although as primarily a compilation album only the two tracks of newly created material were changed. A 50-track demo (the last two tracks being "Convening the Coven" and "Maria Owens") of Nyman's score has been circulating among fans as a bootleg. The complete Nyman score runs 62:30 and contains music that would later appear, in altered form, in Ravenous and The Actors, as well as a bit of his stepwise chord progression theme from Out of the Ruins/String Quartet No. 3/Carrington/The End of the Affair/The Claim. "Convening the Coven", though not "Maria Owens", was subsequently reissued on The Very Best of Michael Nyman: Film Music 1980–2001, and music that uses material related to this piece has not been used elsewhere. "Convening the Coven" became "City of Turin" on The Glare.

Singer Stevie Nicks headlined the soundtrack's published advertisements. The lead single was "If You Ever Did Believe", a song Nicks had originally written in the 1970s for Fleetwood Mac. After the song did not make the track list for Rumours, Nicks allowed Louise Goffin to record it for her 1981 album. The Practical Magic soundtrack marked the first time Nicks released her own version of the song. Nicks also recorded a new version of her song "Crystal". Both songs feature Sheryl Crow on back-up vocals.

Track listing

1. "If You Ever Did Believe" – Stevie Nicks
2. "This Kiss" – Faith Hill
3. "Got to Give It Up (Pt.1)" – Marvin Gaye
4. "Is This Real?" – Lisa Hall
5. "Black Eyed Dog" – Nick Drake
6. "A Case of You" – Joni Mitchell
7. "Nowhere and Everywhere" – Michelle Lewis
8. "Always on My Mind" – Elvis Presley
9. "Everywhere" – Bran Van 3000
10. "Coconut" – Harry Nilsson
11. "Crystal" – Stevie Nicks
12. "Practical Magic" – Alan Silvestri / "Convening the Coven" – The Michael Nyman Orchestra
13. "Amas Veritas" – Alan Silvestri / "Maria Owens" – The Michael Nyman Orchestra

=== Charts ===
Chart performance for Practical Magic (Music from the Motion Picture)
Chart (2026)	Peak position
Irish Compilations (IRMA)	29
UK Compilation Albums (Official Charts)	51
UK Soundtrack Albums (Official Charts)	3

=== Certifications ===
Region	Certification	Certified units/sales
United States (RIAA)	Gold	500,000^{^}
^{^} Shipments figures based on certification alone.

== Reception ==
=== Box office ===
Practical Magic opened at #1 with $13.1 million in ticket sales, beating Antz, Bride of Chucky, and Beloved. In Australia, the film debuted at the top of the box office ahead of Ronin and The Waterboy, making $1.6 million in its first weekend. The film went on to gross $94.4 million worldwide, on a production budget of $60–75 million.

=== Critical response ===
Practical Magic received negative reviews from critics upon release, who panned its inconsistent tone and script. On the review aggregator website Rotten Tomatoes, the film holds an approval rating of 31% based on 111 reviews, with an average rating of 5.1/10. The website's critics consensus reads, "Practical Magic's jarring tonal shifts sink what little potential its offbeat story may have – though Nicole Kidman and Sandra Bullock's chemistry makes a strong argument for future collaborations." On Metacritic, which assigns a weighted average score out of 100 to reviews from mainstream critics, the film received an average score of 46 based on 22 critics, indicating "mixed or average" reviews. Audiences polled by CinemaScore gave the film an average grade of B− on an A+ to F scale.

Owen Gleiberman of Entertainment Weekly gave Practical Magic a negative review, calling it "a witch comedy so slapdash, plodding, and muddled it seems to have had a hex put on it." Roger Ebert of the Chicago Sun-Times spoke of the film's unsure tone, "veering uncertainly from horror to laughs to romance", and opined that the film "is too scary for children and too childish for adults". Angie Errigo of Empire stated that "it tootles along being cute and fluffy like a twentysomethings' version of Sabrina the Teenage Witch, but to further its notions of sisterhood and the power of women, it also takes a spin through Thelma & Louise territory, then revisits The Exorcist to up the supernatural content. It's enough to make your head spin".

Garth Stahl of the Hartford Courant was more positive, noting that women in dark comedy and depictions of sisterhood are rare in film. He wrote Practical Magic "has its flaws. Some scenes are weak, occasionally lines are a little muddled, and there is some plot underdevelopment. Yet it is daring and fun — a frolic for two charming actresses and a dapper film premise". He concluded "The main source of attraction is undeniably the enchanting and witty witchcraft. It is simultaneously what makes the Owen sisters outcasts and what makes them special. With a few very sharp scenes, including a jazzy dance sequence, 'Practical Magic' is worth [it]. It is a step toward allowing women to assert themselves in the genre of dark comedy. Now isn't that practical."

=== Accolades ===
Award	Year	Category	Recipient	Result	Ref.
American Comedy Awards	1999	Funniest Supporting Actress in a Motion Picture	Dianne Wiest	Nominated	
Blockbuster Entertainment Awards	1999	Favorite Actor – Comedy/Romance	Aidan Quinn	Nominated	
Blockbuster Entertainment Awards	1999	Favorite Supporting Actress – Comedy/Romance	Stockard Channing	Won	
Blockbuster Entertainment Awards	1999	Favorite Supporting Actress – Comedy/Romance	Dianne Wiest	Nominated	
Blockbuster Entertainment Awards	1999	Favorite Song from a Movie	"This Kiss" by Faith Hill	Nominated	
Youth in Film Awards	1999	Best Performance in a Feature Film – Supporting Young Actress	Camilla Belle	Nominated	
Youth in Film Awards	1999	Best Performance in a Feature Film – Supporting Young Actress	Evan Rachel Wood	Nominated	

== Release ==
Practical Magic was released theatrically in the United States on October 16, 1998, by Warner Bros. Pictures.

The film was released on VHS and DVD in the United States on February 16, 1999, by Warner Home Video. A 4K Ultra HD Blu-ray was released on August 25, 2026, from Warner Bros. Home Entertainment.

== Legacy ==
The film has acquired a cult following over the years. Writing about Practical Magic's legacy in 2018, David Sims of The Atlantic discussed how the film centers relationships between women through the Owens bloodline as well as in the final scene involving the town's women uniting to free Gillian from Jimmy's control. He described the film as a mainstream studio feature "that wove dark themes about gender and power into an ostensible crowd-pleasing comedy", qualities that made it unusual for its time and have contributed to its staying power.

When first streamed on Max in October 2024, Practical Magic secured the #5 spot for top films on the streaming platform.

=== In other media ===
Warner Bros. and CBS produced the 2004 television pilot Sudbury, written by Becky Hartman Edwards and directed by Bryan Spicer, starring Kim Delaney in the Bullock role and Jeri Ryan in the Kidman role. Named for the Sudbury, Massachusetts location of the novel and film, the series was not picked up.

Warner Bros. and ABC Family attempted to develop a prequel television series in 2010.

HBO Max announced development of a prequel television series in 2019, based on Alice Hoffman's 2017 prequel novel The Rules of Magic, with Jessica Jones creator Melissa Rosenberg writing and executive producing. The project never came to fruition.

=== Sequel ===
Development of a sequel was announced in June 2024, with Bullock and Kidman returning to produce the film with Di Novi. Later that same month, Nicole Kidman confirmed that she and Sandra Bullock would reprise their roles in the sequel. Akiva Goldsman, who co-wrote the screenplay for the original film, would return to write the script. Griffin Dunne hinted that a woman would direct the sequel, while he served as an executive producer.

The sequel is based on Alice Hoffman's 2021 novel The Book of Magic, the fourth installment in her Practical Magic series. Susanne Bier was ultimately confirmed to direct the sequel, Joey King and Maisie Williams were cast as Sally's daughters, and in July 2025, Stockard Channing and Dianne Wiest were confirmed to reprise their roles as Frances and Jet. The film was released in September 2026.

=== Musical ===
On February 9, 2026, it was confirmed that a Broadway musical based on the film was in development, to be written by series author Alice Hoffman and Peter Duchan, with an original score by Norah Jones and Gregg Wattenberg, and Maria Friedman directing.

== See also ==
- List of films about witchcraft
- List of ghost films
