= Practical Magic 2 =

2026 film by Susanne Bier

- Theatrical release poster
- Directed by: Susanne Bier
- Screenplay by: Akiva Goldsman; Georgia Pritchett; Kelly Marcel
- Based on: The Book of Magic by Alice Hoffman
- Produced by: Denise Di Novi; Sandra Bullock; Nicole Kidman
- Starring: Sandra Bullock; Nicole Kidman; Joey King; Lee Pace; Maisie Williams; Xolo Maridueña; Dianne Wiest; Stockard Channing
- Cinematography: Simon Duggan
- Edited by: Sam Williams
- Music by: Rupert Gregson-Williams
- Production companies: Alcon Entertainment; Di Novi Pictures; Fortis Films; Blossom Films
- Distributed by: Warner Bros. Pictures
- Release dates: August 26, 2026 (Odeon Luxe Leicester Square); September 10, 2026 (United States)
- Running time: 130 minutes
- Country: United States
- Language: English
- Budget: $75 million (net)
- Box office: $106 million

Practical Magic 2 is a 2026 American romantic fantasy film directed by Susanne Bier from a screenplay by Akiva Goldsman, Georgia Pritchett, and Kelly Marcel, based on the 2021 novel The Book of Magic by Alice Hoffman. The sequel to Practical Magic (1998), the film stars Sandra Bullock, Nicole Kidman, Dianne Wiest, and Stockard Channing reprising their roles from the previous film, alongside new cast members Joey King, Lee Pace, Maisie Williams, and Xolo Maridueña.

Practical Magic 2 was released by Warner Bros. Pictures in the United States on September 10, 2026. The film received mixed reviews from critics, and it has grossed $106 million worldwide against a production budget of $75 million.

== Plot ==
A few years after the events of the first film, in Massachusetts, the Owens family is struck by tragedy once again by the curse cast by their ancestor, Maria Owens: that any man who loves an Owens woman meets tragedy. Sisters Sally and Gillian believe that they broke the curse, but Sally's second husband, Gary Hallet, dies soon after they are married. Grief-stricken, Sally rejects her magic and casts a final spell to make her daughters, Kylie and Antonia, forget about magic, hoping the curse will never affect them.

Years later, Sally and Gillian's aunt Jet follows a raven omen to the Book of Raven, which contains instructions to break Maria's curse, but crucial pages are sealed. Jet, knowing she will die soon, leaves a note with the book for her sister Frances to continue her work. Kylie and Antonia return home for Jet's birthday, which they celebrate with Sally, Gillian, and the aunts.

After Jet dies, the family holds a wake at the house. There, Sally and Gillian meet Kylie's boyfriend, Gideon. Kylie tells him she loves him, and the next morning he is hit by a car and left in a coma.

Kylie confronts Sally about the rumors that she and Antonia grew up knowing about an Owens curse. Sally, pressed by Gillian, admits that she hid their magical heritage, leaving them unprepared. Kylie, angered, steals the Book of Raven, hoping to find a way to save Gideon.

Kylie experiences visions that guide her to England. Sally and Gillian follow her and, as advised by Frances, search for Ian Wright, a professor specializing in magic. They find him, bound by a curse, and free him. The next day, Ian helps unblock Sally's magic, allowing her to find Kylie.

Kylie travels to the town of Thornfield, Maria Owens' birthplace, searching for Lockland Manor. She meets Tom Bailey, who encourages her efforts to break the Owens curse and save her boyfriend. He tells Kylie that Maria's mother, Hannah Owens, was a servant to Lord Lockland and was burned as a witch on the manor grounds.

Sally and Gillian travel to Thornfield with Ian and they stay with his mother in the pub she owns for the night. Sally and Ian share a meal. Sally is drawn to him, but is cautious because he is also from the town. Sally senses that Kylie is in trouble. At Tom's house, the trio find evidence that he attempted to practice dark magic and was Ian's apprentice.

The sisters knock Ian unconscious and race to the Lockland Manor ruins where Tom is casting a spell to steal Kylie's magic. He is descended from Hannah's second child, born to Lord Lockland and cut off from magic. Tom has attempted to gain magic his entire life. It was he who cursed Ian and stole his Rauðskinna Grimoire to lure Kylie and the Book of Raven to Thornfield.

Sally, Gillian, and Kylie form a circle around Tom and use blood bond magic to destroy him. Sally and Kylie reconcile and discover that the Book of Raven pages have opened, revealing that Maria's curse can only be broken by a witch willingly sacrificing their life. Sally apologizes to Ian and returns home with Gillian and Kylie. Hearing how to break the Owens curse, Frances willingly walks into the river while Jet's spirit watches, finally breaking the curse.

A year later, Kylie and Antonia have learned more about their magical heritage. Kylie and Gideon get married. At the reception, Sally shares a kiss with Ian. Sally, Gillian, Kylie, and Antonia use umbrellas to fly off the roof in front of their guests.

== Cast ==
- Sandra Bullock as Sally Owens, a witch and the older of the two Owens sisters.
- Nicole Kidman as Gillian Owens, a witch and Sally's younger sister.
- Stockard Channing as Frances "Franny" Owens, a witch and the more brazen of Sally and Gillian's eccentric aunts.
- Dianne Wiest as Bridget "Jet" Owens, a witch and the softer of Sally and Gillian's eccentric aunts.
- Joey King as Kylie Owens, Sally's elder daughter who discovers dark family secrets that plunge the Owens family into a crisis.
  - Scarlett Nasrat as young Kylie Owens
- Maisie Williams as Antonia Owens, Sally's younger daughter who works as a medical student
  - Harriett Scott as young Antonia Owens
- Lee Pace as Professor Ian Wright, an academic professor who studies history of magic
- Xolo Maridueña as Gideon, Kylie's love interest
- Solly McLeod as Thomas "Tom" Lockland, a dark warlock using Kylie's powers
- Katy Wix as Paula

== Production ==
=== Development ===
On June 10, 2024, Warner Bros. Pictures announced that a sequel to the 1998 film Practical Magic was in development with Akiva Goldsman returning to write the script. Sandra Bullock and Nicole Kidman were in negotiations to reprise their roles and produce the film with Denise Di Novi. On June 13, 2024, Kidman confirmed that she would return, alongside Bullock.

In July 2024, Di Novi stated that the sequel would be based on the novel The Book of Magic, also by Alice Hoffman, which serves as the final book in the original series. In May 2025, Susanne Bier was announced as the director, with Georgia Pritchett joining Goldsman to co-write the screenplay.

=== Casting ===
In May 2025, it was reported that Joey King was in talks to join the cast making this her second collaboration with Kidman after A Family Affair. In July 2025, it was announced that Dianne Wiest and Stockard Channing would reprise their roles as Aunts Jet and Franny Owens, while Lee Pace, Maisie Williams, Xolo Maridueña and Solly McLeod joined the cast in undisclosed roles.

=== Filming ===
In June 2025, in was reported that the film would be filmed at Warner Bros. Studios Leavesden in Hertfordshire, England. On July 18, 2025, Kidman revealed the principal photography has begun. Simon Duggan served as the cinematographer. In August 2025, Bullock was spotted filming in the Hamptons in Worcester Park, London, which had been transformed into a seaside village. Production wrapped on September 13, 2025.

=== Music ===
Rupert Gregson-Williams scored the film's soundtrack. Three original songs were also recorded for the soundtrack, "Caught Myself Believing" by Bleachers, "Blur" by Aldae, and a cover of the Billy Joel single "And So It Goes" by Brandi Carlile.

== Release ==
Practical Magic 2 premiered at the Odeon Luxe Leicester Square in London on August 26, 2026, and was released in the United States and Canada on September 10. It was previously scheduled to be released the following week, on September 18. It was Bullock's third theatrical sequel to be released, after Speed 2: Cruise Control in 1997 and Miss Congeniality 2: Armed and Fabulous in 2005. The film was released on VOD on October 13, 2026, and will be followed by 4K Ultra HD, Blu-ray and DVD on December 1.

== Reception ==
=== Box office ===
As of October 30, 2026, Practical Magic 2 has grossed $69 million in the United States and Canada, and $37 million in other territories, for a worldwide total of $106 million. Despite its moderate production and marketing costs, Variety wrongly estimated the film would lose Warner Bros. $30–40 million from its theatrical run (though the publication also noted a source close to the film claimed it would ultimately turn a $5 million profit).

In the United States and Canada, Practical Magic 2 was released alongside The Uprising, Hope, Runner, and Oasis: Don't Look Back in Anger, and was projected to gross around $40 million from 4,146 theaters in its opening weekend. The film made $12.5 million on its first day, including $4.7 million from Thursday previews. It went on to debut to $30 million, below expectations but still managing to become the first film to dethrone Spider-Man: Brand New Day atop the box office after six weeks. Overseas, the film grossed $16 million, for a global opening weekend of $46 million.

=== Critical response ===
On the review aggregator website Rotten Tomatoes, 35% of 175 critics' reviews are positive, with an average rating of 5.0/10. The website's consensus reads: "Nostalgic and inert, Practical Magic 2 has charms thanks to Sandra Bullock and Nicole Kidman's sisterly rapport, but its mechanical plotting is a whole lot of toil that's not worth the trouble." Metacritic, which uses a weighted average, assigned the film a score of 44 out of 100, based on 41 critics, indicating "mixed or average" reviews. Audiences polled by CinemaScore gave the film an average grade of "B+" on an A+ to F scale, up from the B– earned by the first film, while those surveyed by PostTrak gave it an 4.5 out of five stars, with 72% saying they would definitely recommend the film.

Nikki Gemmell of The Australian gave it a three-out-of-five review and wrote, "Fans will still be fans. They'll be flocking and they'll leave satisfied. But the film has none of the audacious, provocative energy of a Barbie or a Wuthering Heights; it's not going to enter water-cooler conversations, not going to stick." In a negative review, Tim Robey of The Daily Telegraph called the film "a blandly watchable but stubbornly inessential sequel".

=== Accolades ===
Award	Date of ceremony	Category	Recipient(s)	Result	Ref.
Queerties Awards	March 10, 2026	Next Big Thing	Practical Magic 2	Nominated	

== See also ==
- List of films about witchcraft
