= Claude Fredericks =

American poet and playwright

- Born: October 14, 1923; Springfield, Missouri
- Died: January 11, 2013 (aged 89); Pawlet, Vermont
- Occupations: Diarist, teacher, printer, playwright, poet
- Spouse: Marc Harrington (m. 2010)
- Writing career
- Notable work: The Journal of Claude Fredericks: 1932-2012

Claude Fredericks (October 14, 1923 – January 11, 2013) was an American poet, playwright, printer, writer, and teacher. He was a professor of literature at Bennington College in Vermont for more than 30 years, from 1961 to 1992.

In the late 1940s Fredericks founded Banyan Press, which for decades issued hand-set limited editions by writers such as Gertrude Stein, John Berryman, and James Merrill. The first several thousand pages of The Journal of Claude Fredericks, a personal diary that is almost unprecedented in its length, continuity, detail, and candor, has been published in several volumes. More than 50,000 manuscript pages are held by the Getty Center in Los Angeles, California.

== Early life and education ==
Fredericks was born in Springfield, Missouri, on October 14, 1923. A precocious and lonely child, he began keeping a diary when he was eight years old. His mother took him to weekly Sunday afternoon picture shows and he listened to broadcasts of plays and symphony concerts on the radio. She took him on trips to New York, the Caribbean, Mexico, and Europe in the 1930s.

In 1941, at seventeen, he entered Harvard College, where he studied Greek with John Huston Finley Jr., Sanskrit with Walter Eugene Clark, and Oriental Art with Langdon Warner. His friends included Anaïs Nin, May Sarton, John Simon, John Berryman, Delmore Schwartz, Alan Rich, Paul Doguereau, and Fanny Peabody Mason. He left college after a year and a half.

In 1944, he moved to New York, settled into a large, empty room at 35 East 65th Street, and began to study on his own. He continued to maintain his journal and wrote stories and poems. To these he added several radio plays and a short novel, The Wedding.

== Career ==
=== Banyan Press ===
Fredericks decided that printing books by hand would allow him to make a living without worrying about having his own writings published. It suited his passion for writing and for books as physical objects. In 1946, he worked for a short time at Anaïs Nin’s Gemor Press and learned some of the rudiments of printing.

In 1947, in a basement butcher-shop on East 29th Street, he launched the Banyan Press, named for the tree that re-roots itself from its own branches. Almost at once, he developed a distinguished reputation. He printed books and broadsides that are in themselves small works of art, often stunning in their simplicity and elegance. He printed books off and on for close to fifty years, and today they are much sought after by those who love fine printing, collectors, and dealers in rare books. The Getty Research Center holds the archives of the venture and summarizes its history: "The Banyan Press was a small press founded in 1946 by Claude Fredericks and Milton Saul. In 1948 they moved their operation, a single 10 inch by 14 inch Golding press, to Pawlet, Vermont. Most of the book design and press work was done by Fredericks. Three or four items were designed by Saul, and one by Harry Prickett. Saul did most of the typesetting. All type was set by hand except for one item, the introduction to The Poetry Center Presents (1947), which was printed from Linotype. After 1950 Fredericks ran the press alone under his own name, except for the period 1975-1978, when he was assisted by David Beeken."

In the January 1979 issue of Fine Print, he summarized his intentions as a printer:

...to expunge from the idea of craftsmanship much that is precious, self-asserting, and merely silly, and to get free of all such ideas of 'fine printing', 'art', and 'design'; to print—by hand of course—the classics of our literature with integrity, simplicity, and skill, and with the best materials available; to make new and immediate those texts that endure but that in the passage of time inevitably grow tarnished and deserve in every new generation to be translated and to be printed still again. This means, of course, conceiving them anew in the language of one’s own time—but with neither eccentricity, self-expressiveness, nor a radical break with whatever subtle tradition is present—not designing them, but letting their beauty arise inevitably and uniquely from the flawless skill of true craftsmanship, from the very making of the book itself.

The Banyan Press catalog is far-ranging and consists largely of unpublished works, printed by hand in limited editions, by well-known writers such as Gertrude Stein, Wallace Stevens, Richard Eberhart, Stephen Spender, Osbert Sitwell, André Gide, Florine Stettheimer, James Merrill, Robert Duncan, John Berryman, Thomas Merton, Bernard Malamud, Charles Simic, as well as works by John Donne, Thomas Traherne, William Blake, Meister Eckhart, Francis of Assisi, and other writers from earlier centuries.

Many university libraries and public libraries, including the Rare Book Room of The New York Public Library, have extensive collections of the large output that Fredericks produced over his 50 years as a printer. Complete runs are at the Fales Library at New York University and also at the Research Institute of the Getty Center in Los Angeles. There was a large exhibition of Fredericks's entire production on display at The Fales Library in 1985. In his introduction to the exhibition, Frank Walker, Curator at The Fales, wrote: “The Banyan Press is one of the finest of 20th Century small presses in the classic purity of its design, the quality of its execution, and the excellence of the work it chose to publish."

=== Playwright ===
After moving to a beautiful Greek Revival farmhouse in Pawlet, Vermont, in 1948 Fredericks began to write plays, more than a dozen over the next thirty years. Many received New York productions; several others were left unfinished. His three most successful plays were performed off-Broadway in the 1950s and 1960s. Julian Beck and Judith Malina at The Living Theatre produced Fredericks's The Idiot King in 1954, and the Artists Theatre, directed by Herbert Machiz and John Bernard Myers, produced On Circe's Island and A Summer Ghost in 1961. In 1965, A Summer Ghost appeared in the first volume of New American Plays, edited by Robert Corrigan, and The Bennington Review included On Circe’s Island in its issue for the winter of 1969. The Idiot King was not published until 2012, when it appeared alongside A Summer Ghost and On Circe’s Island in a volume entitled Three Plays.

In 1959, the Living Theater presented Luigi Pirandello's Tonight We Improvise in a translation by Fredericks. In 1962, writing in the New York Times, Arthur Gelb panned a production of On Circe's Island and The Summer Ghost, presented together under the title Charlatans: "the two plays talk themselves into a kind of numbing dullness." He called them "the longest short plays to visit Off Broadway in many a balmy April."

=== Teaching ===
In 1961 Fredericks began to teach at Bennington College, famous for the non-traditional, even radical, liberal-arts education it offered its students. He could read many of the works he taught in their original languages: Latin, Greek, and Japanese.

His courses there—among them Homer, Virgil & Dante; Poetic Idiom; Shakespeare; Japanese Novels; Theatrical Idiom; and Religious Experience—were, notably at the time, taught not in a classroom, but usually in a living room in one of the old white clapboard student houses scattered about the Common. Fredericks also taught students in tutorials usually held in his second-floor corner office in Commons Building at Bennington.

He left Bennington in 1992.

Fredericks's students at Bennington included the novelist Donna Tartt, who likely modeled character on Julian Morrow in The Secret History (1992) on him, and dedicated The Goldfinch (2013), winner of the 2014 Pulitzer Prize, to him. Other students included: novelist Bret Easton Ellis, poets Anne Waldman and Kathleen Norris, Roger Kimball, editor and publisher of The New Criterion, activist Andrea Dworkin, and philanthropist Yasmin Aga Khan. Colleagues of Fredericks at Bennington included: novelists Bernard Malamud, Arturo Vivante, and Shirley Jackson, poet Howard Nemerov, literary critics Stanley Edgar Hyman, Kenneth Burke, and Camille Paglia, art critic Lawrence Alloway, composers Marc Blitzstein, Henry Brant, painters Kenneth Noland and Jules Olitski, and sculptor Anthony Caro.

== Writings ==
Fredericks's personal diary is notable for its length and continuity. He began keeping a journal in 1932 when he was eight years old and wrote for more than eighty years, with his last entries dated a week before his death; it fills some 65,000 pages.

In the 1960s, when Robert Giroux proposed publication, Fredericks declined because he had written candidly about so many people still living. When he changed his mind years later, Giroux thought it too late to interest the reading public in figures no longer current: "The moment's passed. Now who knows who Carl Van Vechten is?"

Yale scholar Langdon Hammer describes it as "a project of self-knowledge tirelessly pursued". The manuscript, then unfinished and consisting of more than 30 million words was purchased by the Getty Research Institute at the Getty Center in Los Angeles in 1988. In anticipation of publication, The Stinehour Press produced a prospectus in 1997 that described The Journal in this way:

It is a book that is peopled with literally thousands of people but documents a life often passed in monkish solitude. At times the journal is compulsively detailed about the merest minutiae of daily life but at other times consciously and with as much art as the writer at any given moment has at his command seeks to create the reality of an hour, an evening, a day. There is a good deal of actual narrative—that of the writer’s own life and also that of the lives of innumerable other people—but also a great deal of introspection that seeks to understand the narrative and what it says about the nature of life itself.

In 1995 Fredericks, with the collaboration of Marc Harrington, his former student at Bennington, began editing the journal for publication. Before his death, Fredericks had participated in editing his journals as far as 1944.

Fredericks, who had written thousands of poems, published a small collection of 141 of them in Selected Poems in 2005, drawing on his journals where he had recorded his drafts and revisions.

In 2010, the Claude Fredericks Foundation was incorporated with the two-fold purpose of publishing the entire Journal and other of Fredericks's writings as well as preserving—as a museum, library, and retreat center—the writer's house and land in Pawlet, Vermont.

== Personal life ==
Fredericks took several trips abroad as an adult. He visited Europe in 1950–52 with James Merrill and Japan in 1966. He lived in Rome in 1983–84.

Fredericks had a romantic relationship in the early 1950s with James Merrill and they remained lifelong friends. Merrill wrote about the relationship in his 1993 memoir A Different Person.

At Bennington, Fredericks was rumored to have participated in a campus culture where students and professors intermingled, and occasionally conducted affairs. According to Lili Anolik's podcast Once Upon A Time ... At Bennington College, homosexuality was a topic of discussion in some of the classics courses Fredericks taught. One course catalog written presumably by Fredericks in 1982-84 read, "studies in some of the classical texts of homosexual love. Only incidental consideration will be given to merely neurotic or glandular manifestations, but the relationship of friendship to love and of agape to eros, will be one of the underlying concerns since it will be one of the underlying presumptions of the course that love between men is a unique experience and not merely a question of pronouns."

Marc Harrington began living with Fredericks in 1995. The last 15,000 pages of The Journal of Claude Fredericks is a detailed depiction of their intimate life together. They married in 2010. Harrington is the director of the Claude Fredericks Foundation.

Fredericks died at home in Pawlet, Vermont, on January 11, 2013.

== Published work ==
- A Summer Ghost: a play in one act. New York: Hill and Wang. 1965; reprinted in Robert W. Corrigan, ed. (1967). New American Plays. New York: Hill & Wang.
- The Journal of Claude Fredericks Volume One Part One: Springfield (1932-1939). Xlibris. 2004. ISBN 9781401081515.
- The Journal of Claude Fredericks Volume One Part Two : Springfield (1940-1941). Xlibris. 2004. ISBN 9781413411058.
- Selected Poems. Xlibris. 2005. ISBN 9781413482430.
- The Journal of Claude Fredericks: Volume Two Part One: Cambridge (1941-1942). Xlibris. 2009. ISBN 978-1436336437.
- The Journal of Claude Fredericks: Volume Two Part Two: Cambridge (1942). Xlibris. 2009. ISBN 9781436336451.
- The Journal of Claude Fredericks Volume Three Part One: Cambridge (1943). Xlibris. 2011. ISBN 9781465340092.
- The Journal of Claude Fredericks Volume Three Part Two: From Maine to Mexico (1943). Xlibris. 2011. ISBN 9781465340153.
- Three Plays. Xlibris. 2012. ISBN 9781469179650.
