= A Lesson in Vengeance =

2021 novel by Victoria Lee

- Author: Victoria Lee
- Language: English
- Genre: Fantasy
- Publisher: Delacorte Press
- Publication place: United States

A Lesson in Vengeance is a 2021 fantasy novel by Victoria Lee.

== Summary ==
After spending a year away from school after the disappearance of her girlfriend, Felicity Morrow returns to New England all-girls boarding academy Dalloway School to finish her final year of secondary. However, her new roommate, Ellis Haley, is intent on investigating rumours of the school being haunted by five girls who were murdered for being witches in the 1700s.

== History ==
Lee has described the book as being influenced by The Secret History by Donna Tartt and wrote the book during their PhD dissertation year. The book's cover was designed by Regina Flath.

In July 2021, Titan Publishing Group brought the UK and Commonwealth rights for the book.

== Themes ==
The book touches on issues such as gendered depictions of mental illness in fiction and problems with elite boarding school society, such as classism and racism. The book has been described by several commentators as fitting into the dark academia aesthetic.

== Reception ==
The book received generally positive reviews. Publishers Weekly reviewed the book as having "queer primary characters, an irresistible gothic atmosphere, and unrelenting creeping dread." Alex Brown of Tor.com stated that the book was "a good introduction for horror and gothic newbies and a twisty and twisted diversion for the well-versed." Tor.com also classed the book as one of the 30 most anticipated SFF books for the second half of 2021.

In 2022, A Lesson in Vengeance was listed among 52 books banned by the Alpine School District following the implementation of Utah law H.B. 374, “Sensitive Materials In Schools," 42% of which “feature LBGTQ+ characters and or themes.” Many of the books were removed because they were considered to contain pornographic material according to the new law, which defines porn using the following criteria:

- "The average person" would find that the material, on the whole, "appeals to prurient interest in sex"
- The material "is patently offensive in the description or depiction of nudity, sexual conduct, sexual excitement, sadomasochistic abuse, or excretion"
- The material, on the whole, "does not have serious literary, artistic, political or scientific value."
