= Peabody Mason Concerts =

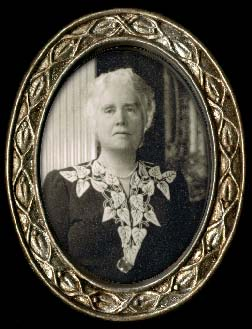
Fanny Peabody Mason

The Peabody Mason Concerts are a historic classical music performance series in Boston, Massachusetts and other areas.

== Benefactor ==
The name Peabody Mason comes from Ms. Fanny Peabody Mason, who until her death in 1948 was an active patroness of music both in the United States and abroad. Her musical interests were piano, singing, and chamber music.

== Concert series premiere ==
The Peabody Mason Concerts were inaugurated in 1891 with a performance by Ferruccio Busoni. The inaugural concert took place in the Mason music room, which had not been used by the family since the death of Miss Mason's mother.

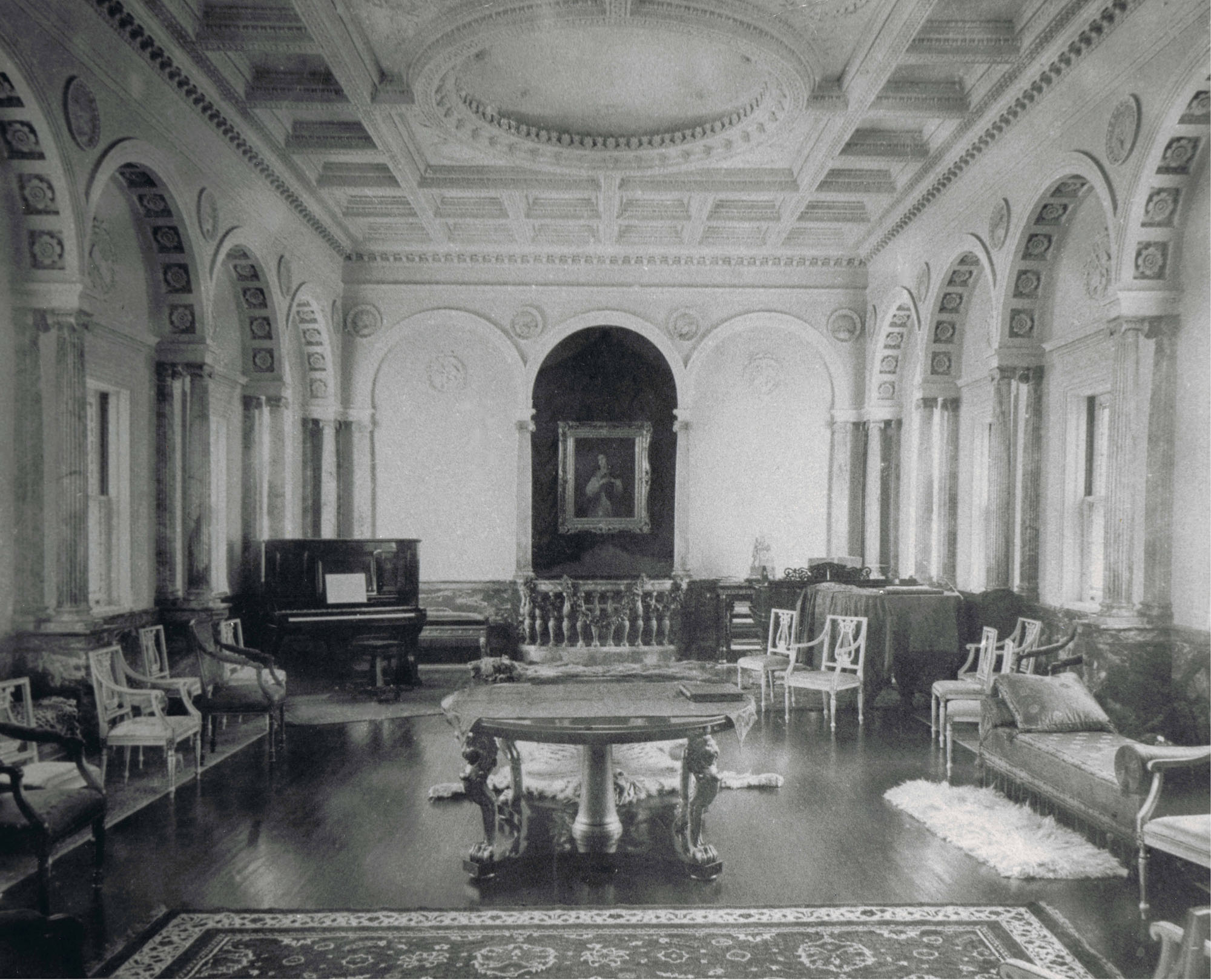
Mason music room, c. 1920

In the years that followed, at her homes in Boston and in Paris, in Beverly on the North Shore and on her two-thousand-acre (8 km^{2}) estate in Walpole, New Hampshire, Miss Mason continued to offer recitals by Ignacy Paderewski, Arthur Rubinstein, the Alfred Cortot-Jacques Thibaud-Pablo Casals trio, Emma Calvé, Maggie Teyte, the Nadia Boulanger Chamber Ensemble, Alexander Brailowsky, Egon Petri and Earl Wild, among many others. In 1945, in Cambridge, Massachusetts, she gave a festival of Fauré's music, including his opera Pénélope in concert form as a centennial commemoration of the birth of Gabriel Fauré. Miss Mason also commissioned Bohuslav Martinu’s Quintet for Piano and Strings, which was performed at her Boston residence at 211 Commonwealth Avenue in the presence of the composer.

The artist for many of the concerts presented by Miss Mason was pianist Paul Doguereau. Doguereau organized the commemorative Fauré Festival and was also the pianist for the performance of the Martinu Piano Quintet. First-prize recipient in piano at the Paris Conservatory, Doguereau studied under several eminent musicians including Emil von Sauer, Egon Petri, Ignaz Paderewski and Maurice Ravel. He concertized in Europe and North America and devoted much of his time to organizing the Peabody Mason concerts.

== Passing The Torch ==
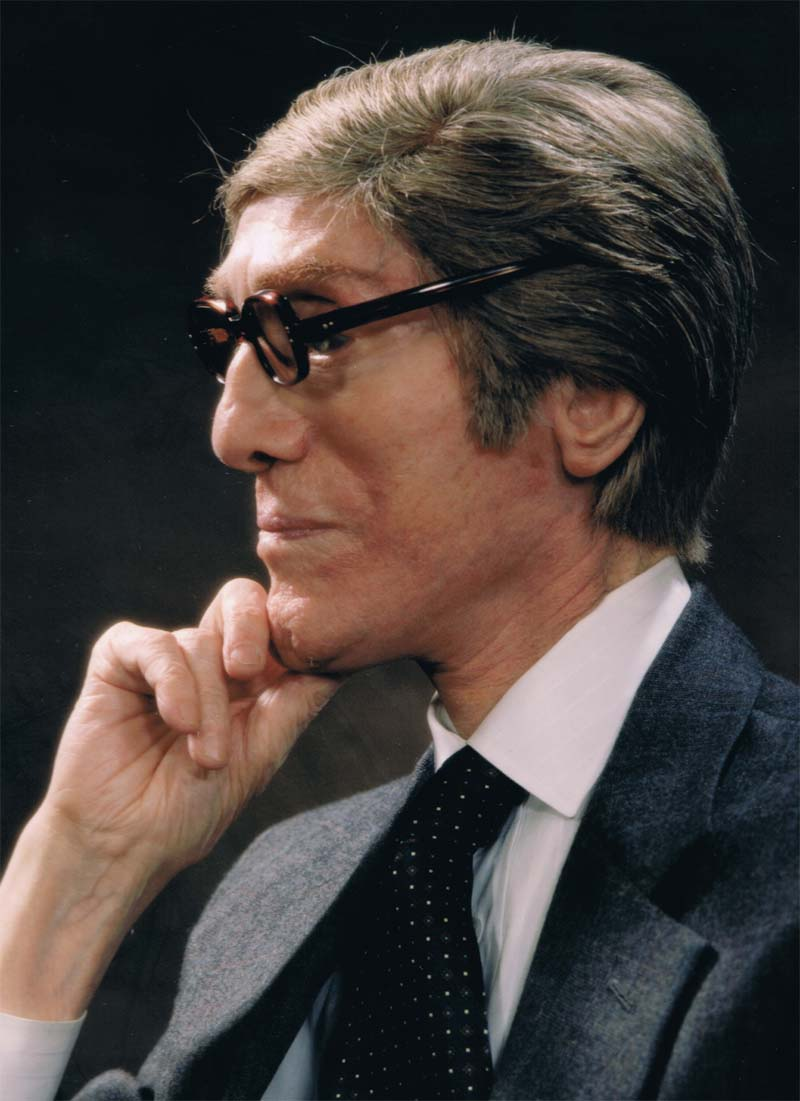
Paul Doguereau

In her later years, Miss Mason transferred more of the responsibilities to her friend, pianist Paul Doguereau. They had often discussed presenting classical music at its best as a gift to general audiences. Upon her death in 1948, Miss Mason left a trust for musical enterprises under Mr. Doguereau's direction. The Peabody Mason concerts continued to faithfully reflect the aspirations and purposes of Miss Mason.

In 1950, the Peabody Mason concerts were re-dedicated to the ideal of presenting established artists as well as young artists in concert. In keeping with this aim, the concerts that followed from 1950 to 1985 featured some of the world's most celebrated musicians.

In April 1950, the re-dedicated Peabody Mason concerts began its first series with the Boston debut of the Juilliard String Quartet. During the first year, excerpts were given from Henry Purcell’s opera The Fairy Queen, conducted by Daniel Pinkham, who was in the early stages of his career, with Phyllis Curtin, a rising opera star at the time who sang the title role. As part of the same program, Pinkham conducted his own composition, a concertino for small orchestra and piano, composed for and dedicated to Paul Doguereau, the soloist.

The concerts took place in Sanders Theater and in Paine Hall in Cambridge, and in Jordan Hall and at the Gardner Museum in Boston. Under the auspices of Peabody Mason, concerts were also given at Columbia University and Alice Tully Hall in New York City, Brown University in Providence and at the American Academy of Arts and Sciences in Brookline.

Appearing during the years since the re-dedication of the Peabody Mason concerts were the Boston/Cambridge debut recitals of pianists Glenn Gould, Maurizio Pollini, Horacio Gutierrez, Nelson Freire, Gerhard Oppitz, Antonio Barbosa, Ronald Turini and Pascal Devoyon; baritone Dietrich Fischer-Dieskau, Gérard Souzay and Håkan Hagegård; harpsichordist Rafael Puyana; sopranos Régine Crespin and Elly Ameling; guitarist Julian Bream; the New York Pro Musica with Noah Greenberg, conductor; the Quartetto di Roma, the Quintetto Chigiano and the Trio Pasquier. These are only several of many distinguished debut performances.

Returning to the Boston area to give Peabody Mason concerts were guitarist Julian Bream; flutist Jean-Pierre Rampal; violinist Joseph Fuchs; pianists Guiomar Novaes, Earl Wild, Alicia de Larrocha, Andre Watts, Maurizio Pollini, Georg Demus, Paul Badura-Skoda, Noël Lee, Andrew Rangell, Eugen Indjic and Misha Dichter; mezzo-sopranos Dame Janet Baker and Teresa Berganza; and renowned ensembles such as the Berlin Philharmonic Octet, the Hungarian String Quartet, the Virtuosi di Roma, the Stuttgart Orchestra, the Lukas Foss Improvisation Chamber Ensemble, the Emerson String Quartet and the New York Vocal Arts Ensemble. Among well-known Boston artists, Donna Roll performed a lieder recital and pianist Luise Vosgerchian gave a concert of chamber music with the violinist Emanuel Borok. These performances were but a few from a long list of artists who appeared in the Peabody Mason concerts.

== The Legacy Continues ==
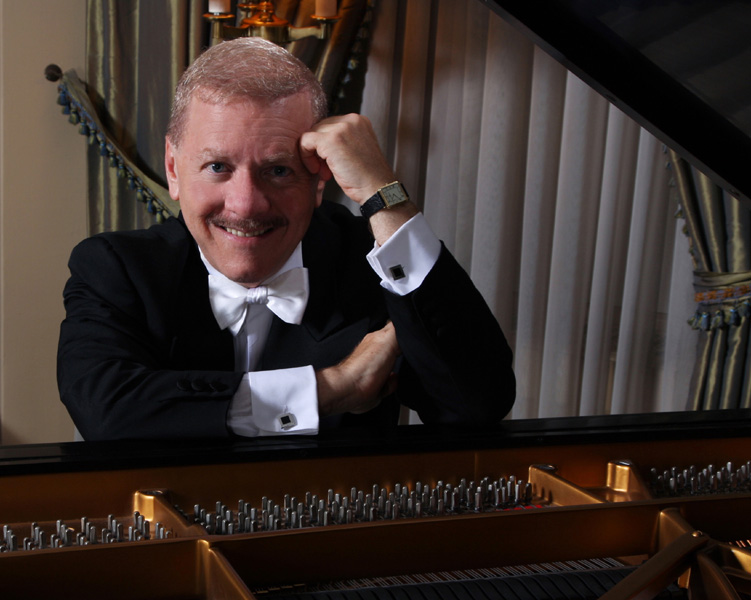
Harrison Slater

In 1995, the trust was gifted to the Boston Symphony Orchestra, although Doguereau's adopted son, Dr. Harrison Slater Wignall, continued to present outstanding artists in his Boston home at 192 Commonwealth Avenue in the years after Paul Doguereau's death and up until his death in 2017. Artists at Slater's concerts included: David Korevaar; Sergey Schepkin; Richard Bosworth; Janice Weber; Ian Lindsey, Marcus Thompson, Igor Lovchinsky; Laura Villafranca; Stephen Porter; cellist Francesco Vila; Joel Cohen and Anne Azéma of the Boston Camerata; tenor Zachary Stains; Joanna Kurkowitz; and Oleksandr Poliykov. On April 6, 2017, Dr. Harrison Slater Wignall died at his residence in Mt. Holly, NJ at the age of 66. The Paul Doguereau and Slater Wignall Peabody Mason legacy ended with Slater Wignall's death.

== Peabody Mason International Piano Competition ==
In recent years, Peabody Mason has also held a piano competition. In the past, the winner received a yearly stipend plus a New York City and a Boston recital. The first Peabody Mason International Piano Competition was held in 1981, with others following in 1984 and 1985. In 2010, Dr. Harrison Slater, the adopted son of Paul Doguereau, once again launched the piano competition as an international event for the 2010 Chopin year (200th anniversary of his birth). Previous winners have included Peter Orth, David Korevaar and Robert Taub. The 2010 competition proved to be the last with the death of Dr. Harrison Slater Wignall in 2017.

== Notes ==
8. https://www.burlingtoncountytimes.com/article/20170416/obituaries/304169774
