= Fine print (disambiguation) =

Fine print is a colloquial term describing printed words that are in smaller, less noticeable typeface than the more obvious larger print that it accompanies.

Fine print may also refer to:

- "Fine Print" (song), a 2009 song by Nadia Ali
- The Fine Print: A Collection of Oddities and Rarities, an album by the band Drive-By Truckers
- The Fine Print, a band in which Jerry Holkins is the lead singer
- "The Fine Print", a fourth season episode of the AMC television series Mad Men
- The Fine Print, a 2012 nonfiction book by David Cay Johnston
- Fine Print (periodical), a periodical from 1975 to 1990
