= It May Never Happen and Other Stories =

1945 short fiction collection by V. S. Pritchett

- Publisher: Chatto & Windus
- Publication date: 1945
- Media type: Print (hardback)
- Pages: 185
- OCLC: 1921342

It May Never Happen and Other Stories is a collection of short fiction by V. S. Pritchett published in 1945 by Chatto & Windus. The volume was republished by Reynal & Hitchcock, New York in 1947.

== Stories ==
- "The Sailor"
- "The Lion's Den"
- "The Saint"
- "It May Never Happen"
- "Peacock Passes"
- "The Oedipus Complex"
- "The Voice"
- "Aunt Gertrude"
- "Many Are Disappointed"
- "The Chestnut-Tree"
- "The Ape"
- "The Clerk's Tale"
- "The Fly in the Ointment"
- "The Night Worker"

== Reviews ==
"By the late 1940s Pritchett, at least in his best stories, was capturing characters of surprising depth and dimension - and capturing them sharply - while seeming to allow them to live and breath and eventually go their own way, without giving his reader a sense that these characters have been reduced or violated...For Pritchett, what will abide is character." - Literary critic John J. Stinson in V. S. Pritchett: A Study of the Short Fiction (1992)

Time observes that "outwardly, nothing much happens" to the array of working class characters who appear in It May Never Happen. Nonetheless, the reviewer considers Pritchett "a fine storyteller."

As in the stories of Virginia Woolf and Elizabeth Bowen, the excitement in these stories grows out of ordinary human tensions and becomes most intense when the explosion is an inner discovery, unspoken and unseen.

Critic John J. Stinson praises "the excellence" of the collection and reports that "the three most noteworthy stories of It Never May Happen may be "The Sailor," "The Saint," and "It May Never Happen."

== Sources ==
- Stinson, John J. 1992. V. S. Pritchett: A Study of the Short Fiction. Twayne Publishers, New York. Gordon Weaver, General Editor. ISBN 0-8057-8341-5
- Treglown, Jeremy. 2004. V. S. Pritchett: A Working Life. Pimlico-Random House, London. ISBN 0-7126-9725-X (paperback).
- Pritchett, V. S.. 1946. It May Never Happen and Other Stories, Chatto & Windus. OCLC 1921342
