= Peabody Mason International Piano Competition =

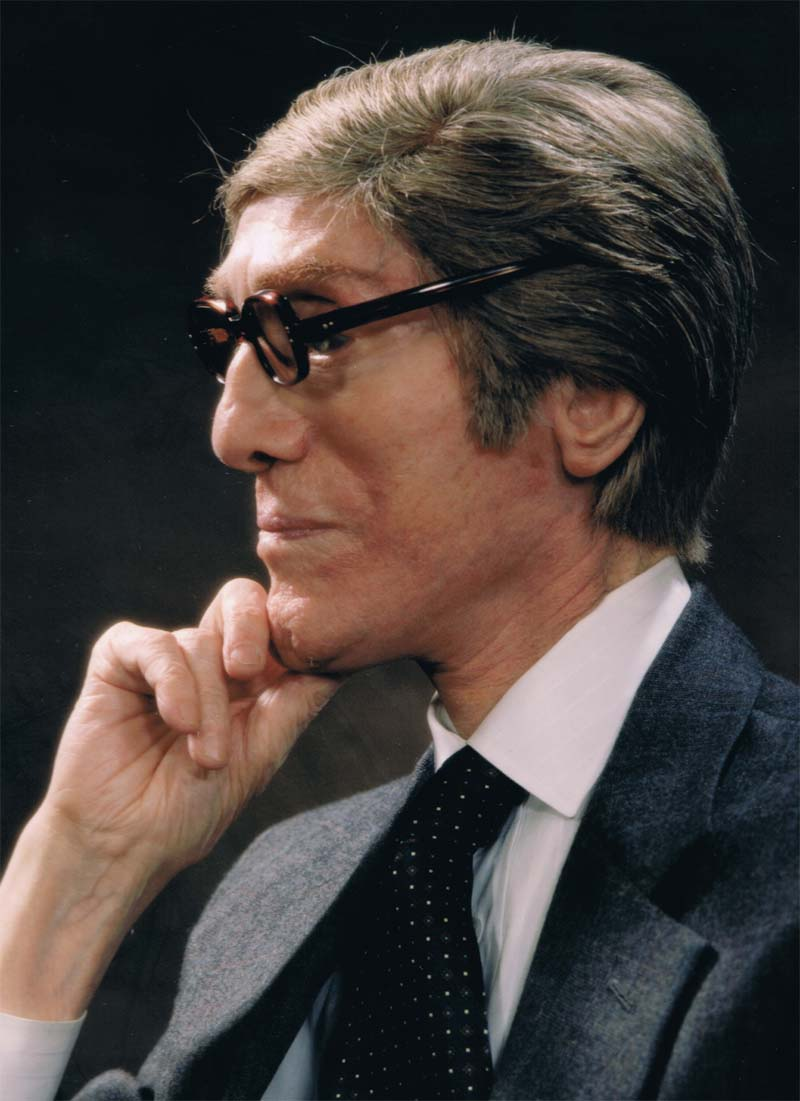
Paul Doguereau

The early Peabody Mason Piano Competitions were organized by Fanny Peabody Mason's longtime friend, pianist Paul Doguereau. The piano competition was inspired by Mason’s commitment to, and aspirations for, the arts and serves to showcase and encourage emerging piano talent. The first competition was held in 1981, with others following in 1984 and 1985. The grand prize winner received a yearly stipend plus a New York and a Boston recital. The competition’s rich heritage, its intermittent nature, and its generous prize have led to a significant reputation and a certain cachet for the award.

== Benefactress ==
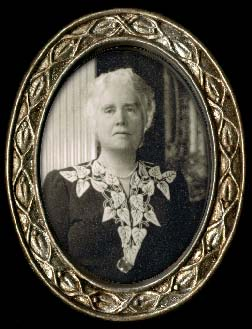
Fanny Peabody Mason

The name Peabody Mason comes from Fanny Peabody Mason, who until her death in 1948 was an active patron of music both in the United States and abroad. Her musical interests were piano, singing and chamber music. Mason was patron of the Peabody Mason Concerts.

== Present activities ==
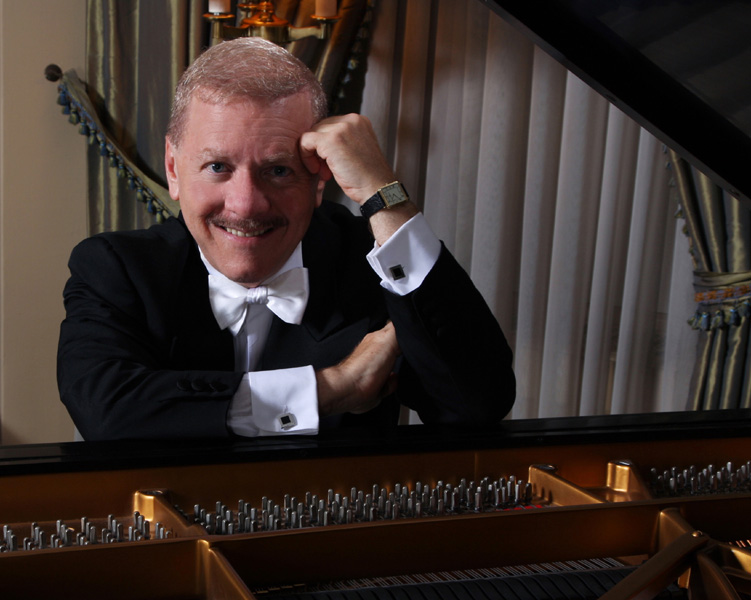
Harrison Slater

After the death of Paul Doguereau in 2000, his adopted son, Harrison Slater, assumed the mantle of Artistic Director and continues the tradition of the Peabody Mason International Piano Competition with an international event for the 2010 Chopin year (200th anniversary of his birth).

== Winners ==
Grand prize winners of the Peabody Mason International Piano Competition include:

- 1981 Robert Taub
- 1984 Peter Orth
- 1985 David Korevaar
- 2010 Tsotne Tsotskhalashvili
