= The Key to My Heart =

The Key to My Heart: A Comedy in Three Parts
- Publisher: Chatto House
- Publication date: 1963
- Media type: Print (hardback)
- Pages: 108
- ISBN: 978-0701110413

The Key to My Heart: A Comedy in Three Parts is a collection of three works of short fiction by V. S. Pritchett, first published by Chatto House in 1963 and repackaged as a novel by Random House in 1964. The stories originally appeared in The New Yorker. The first of the stories, "The Key to My Heart", was selected by the BBC for radio dramatization in 1971.

== Stories ==
- "The Key to My Heart" The New Yorker, July 18, 1959
- "Noisy Flushes the Bird's" The New Yorker, September 23, 1961
- "Noisy in the Doghouse" The New Yorker, November 10, 1962

== Background ==
The Key to My Heart draws from Pritchett's family and community life while residing at Stokke Manor in the Savernake Forest, as well as an examination of "the effects of class consciousness on English behavior."

== Contemporary reviews ==
"Pritchett allows his story to be far more plot-driven than usual and even uses farce effectively. He does so while showing no sign of strain; in fact his narrative style - light, assured and unselfconscious - will remind many readers of Evelyn Waugh." —Literary critic John J. Stinson in V. S. Pritchett: A Study of the Short Fiction (1992).

Critic Frederick C. Crews, writing in the New York Times Book Review, offers a thumb-nail synopsis-analysis of the story:

The Key to My Heart is about the private imbroglio of a village baker who is not noticeably altered or enlightened by his experience, and there is no suggestion that his commonsensical and unreflective autobiography is to be regarded ironically.

Crews surmises that the novel's title, reminiscent of the fiction from the period of Max Beerbohm's Zuleika Dobson (1911), is a measure of Pritchett's "indifference to the charge of sounding old-fashioned." He asks rhetorically "whether this pleasant and breezy tale has any serious claim to our interest." Novelist Brigid Brophy in the New Statesman "dismissed" the cast of characters in the novel as resembling "the quaintness of people in Happy families" playing cards. The comedic narrative, she wrote, "was of the Ealing Studios kind."

== Retrospective appraisal ==
Literary critic John J. Stinson bestows high praise on The Key to My Heart:

The novel is an immensely entertaining, very English social comedy whose droll humor is all the more delicious for its accuracy, especially the way it captures small-town English life. Stinson adds that the novel is a paean to an English social type - the eccentric county gentry: "Readers will know that unofficial but long standing British tradition tolerates and even expects eccentricity will more appreciate these very believable characters."

American literary critic Edmund Wilson considered the collection "a comic masterpiece as well as an acute tableau de moeurs."

Biographer Jeremy Treglown regards these stories as a brief falling off in the quality of Pritchett's fiction: "The work Pritchett did in the mid-1960s was never without confidence or panache...but not until 1968-69 did his fiction begin to return to form."

Prtichett, in a 1985 interview with John Haffenden, remarked:

I suppose I've been guilty of exposing characters just because they're amusing, but I think I've unusually gone beyond that. I wrote a group of stories [The Key to My Heart] about an air pilot called Noisy, for example, which are farcical stories, because I am a great admirer of Chekhov who writes any kind of story, and therefore I don't regard myself as having any moral obligations...

== Sources ==
- Crews, Frederick C. 1964. "Comedy and Beyond." New York Times Book Review, December 3, 1964. Comedy and Beyond Accessed 10 October 2024.
- Haffenden, John. 1985. "V. S. Pritchett," Novelists in Interview. Routledge, Kenan & Paul, London. ISBN 9780416375909
- Stinson, John J. 1992. V. S. Pritchett: A Study of the Short Fiction. Twayne Publishers, New York. Gordon Weaver, General Editor. ISBN 0-8057-8341-5
- Treglown, Jeremy. 2004. V. S. Pritchett: A Working Life. Pimlico, Random House, London. ISBN 0-7126-9725-X (paperback).
- Pritchett, V. S. 1963. The Key to My Heart. Chatto House London. ISBN 978-0701110413
- Pritchett, V. S. 1964. The Key to My Heart and Other Stories Random House, New York. ISBN 978-0394431871
