= A Careless Widow and Other Stories =

1989 collection of short fiction by V. S. Pritchett

- Publisher: Random House
- Publication date: 1989
- Media type: Print (hardback)
- Pages: 164
- ISBN: 978-0394576121

A Careless Widow and Other Stories is a collection of short fiction by V. S. Pritchett published in 1989 by Random House. The six stories first appeared individually in literary periodicals [See below Stories]

Pritchett's last volume of original short fiction, A Careless Widow was published when he was eighty-eight. The collection received the £10,000 WH Smith Literary Award in 1989.

== Stories ==
- "A Trip to the Seaside" The Atlantic, February 1981.
- "Things"
- "A Careless Widow"
- "Cocky Olly" The New Yorker, July 24, 1988
- "A Change of Policy" The New Yorker, April 9, 1989
- "The Image Trade" Vanity Fair, July 1984

== Reception ==
"The stories in A Careless Widow originally appeared in magazines —The New Yorker, Ladies Home Journal, Vanity Fair—but there is never a hint in them of the magazine short story formula, the telling phrase, the situation worked up."—Critic John Bayley (2004)

Characterizing the stories as "quiet and deceptively simple," New York Times critic Lorrie Moore writes:

His is a very English fiction of irony arrayed, hypocrisy exposed, eccentricity embraced. He captures the frustration and strain beneath the moral order of the average citizen, and he is nothing if not funny. Yet his humor never stiffens or distorts. His prose is always limpid...

Moore adds "Sir Victor's is a literature of deep humanity—a mature artist's extension of affection into unexpected corners, a lover's unflagging interest in life."

== Sources ==
- Bayley, John. 1997. In Memoriam: V. S. Pritchett in V. S. Pritchett: The Pritchett Century. The Modern Library, New York. pp. xiii-xxi ISBN 0-679-60244-5
- Bayley, John. 1997. In Memoriam: V. S. Pritchett. London Review of Books, April 24, 1997, volume 19 No.8 In Memoriam: V.S. Pritchett
- Moore, Lorrie. 1989. ORDINARY LIFE ALWAYS WENT TOO FAR. New York Times, October 22, 1989. ORDINARY LIFE ALWAYS WENT TOO FAR Accessed October 10, 2024.
- Pritchett, V. S.. 1989. A Careless Widow and Other Stories. Random House, New York. ISBN 978-0394576121
- Stinson, John J. 1992. V. S. Pritchett: A Study of the Short Fiction. Twayne Publishers, New York. Gordon Weaver, General Editor. ISBN 0-8057-8341-5
- Treglown, Jeremy. 2004. V. S. Pritchett: A Working Life. Pimlico Random House, London. ISBN 0-7126-9725-X (paperback).
