= V. S. Pritchett =

British writer and critic (1900–1997)

Sir V. S. Pritchett CH CBE FRSL
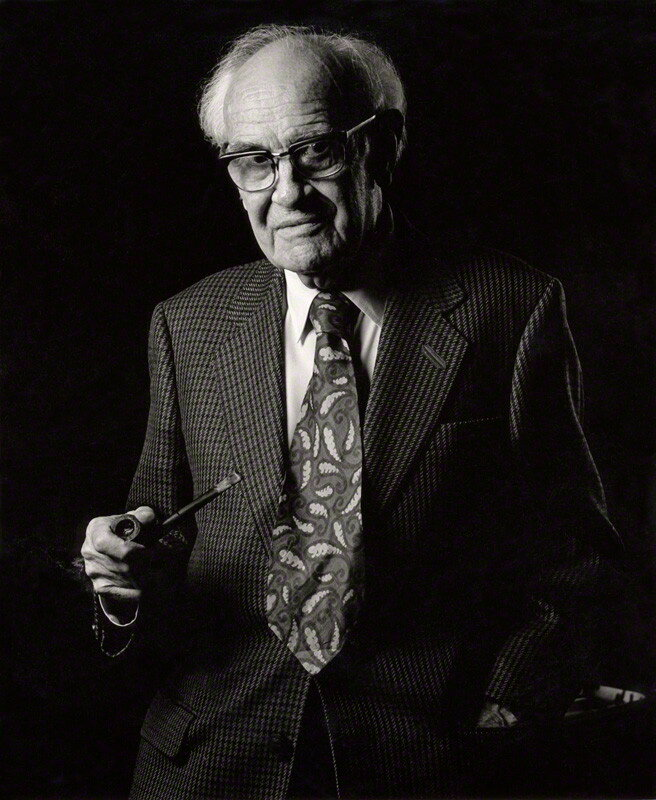
- Born: Victor Sawdon Pritchett; 16 December 1900; Ipswich, Suffolk, England
- Died: 20 March 1997 (aged 96); London, England
- Occupations: Writer; literary critic
- Relatives: Matt Pritchett (grandson); Georgia Pritchett (granddaughter)
- Writing career
- Years active: 1928–1997

Sir Victor Sawdon Pritchett CH CBE FRSL (also known as VSP; 16 December 1900 – 20 March 1997) was a British writer and literary critic.

Pritchett was known particularly for his short stories, collated in a number of volumes. Among his most noteworthy works of short fiction are "The Sailor", "The Saint", and "The Camberwell Beauty".

His non-fiction works include the memoirs A Cab at the Door (1968) and Midnight Oil (1971), and many collections of essays on literary biography and criticism.

== Biography ==
Victor Sawdon Pritchett was born in Suffolk, the first of four children of Walter Sawdon Pritchett and Beatrice Helena (née Martin). His father, a London businessman, relocated to Ipswich to establish a newspaper and stationery shop. The business ran into difficulty and his parents were lodging over a toy shop at 41 St Nicholas Street in Ipswich, where Pritchett was born on 16 December 1900. Beatrice had expected a girl, whom she planned to name after Queen Victoria. Pritchett disliked his first name, having been nearly mauled by a dog named Victor in his youth, hence he always preferred being styled by his initials "VSP", despite formally becoming "Sir Victor Pritchett" after being knighted.

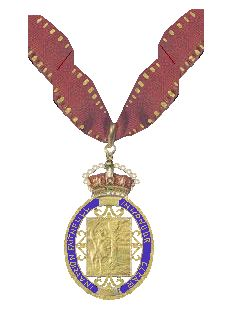
Insignia of Member of the Order of the Companions of Honour

His family moved to Ipswich to be near his mother's sister, who had married money and lived in Warrington Road. Within a year, Walter was declared bankrupt, the family moved to Woodford, Essex, then to Derby and he began selling women's clothing and accessories as a travelling salesman. Pritchett was soon sent with his brother Cyril to live with their paternal grandparents in Sedbergh, where the boys attended their first school. Walter's business failures, his casual attitude to credit and his easy deceitfulness (Note: Walter Pritchett habitually pretended to be a member of the Athenaeum Club to obtain credit falsely, for example.) obliged the family to move frequently. The family was reunited, but life was always precarious. They tended to live in London suburbs with members of Beatrice's family, but returned to Ipswich in 1910 to live for a year near Cauldwell Hall Road, trying to evade Walter's creditors. At this time Pritchett attended St John's School. Subsequently, the family moved to East Dulwich and he attended Alleyn's School, where he first had the urge to be a writer, but when his paternal grandparents came to live with them at age 16, he was forced to leave school to work as a clerk and leather buyer in Bermondsey. At the same time, his father enlisted to work in Hampshire at an aircraft factory to help the war effort. After the Great War Walter turned his hand to aircraft design, about which he knew nothing, and his later ventures included art needlework, property speculation and faith healing.

The leather work lasted from 1916 until 1920 when Pritchett moved to Paris to work as a shop assistant. In 1923 he started writing for The Christian Science Monitor, which sent him to Ireland and Spain. From 1926 he wrote reviews for that paper and for the New Statesman, later being appointed its literary editor.

Pritchett's first book, Marching Spain (1928), describes a journey across Spain, and his second book, Clare Drummer (1929), is about his experiences in Ireland. While there, he met Evelyn Vigors, whom he later married.

Pritchett published five novels, but he said he did not enjoy writing them. His reputation was established by a collection of short stories, The Spanish Virgin and Other Stories (1932).

Vigors had an affair in the 1930s, and meanwhile Pritchett fell in love with another woman, Dorothy Rudge Roberts. In 1936, he divorced his first wife and married Roberts, with whom he had two children; the marriage survived until Pritchett's death in 1997, although they both had other relationships. Their children include the journalist Oliver Pritchett, whose son is the cartoonist Matt Pritchett MBE, and daughter is screenwriter Georgia Pritchett.

During the Second World War, Pritchett worked for the BBC and the Ministry of Information while continuing to write weekly essays for the New Statesman. After World War II, he wrote extensively and embarked on various positions as a university lecturer in the United States: Princeton (1953), the University of California (1962), Columbia University and Smith College. Fluent in French, German and Spanish, he published acclaimed biographies of Honoré de Balzac (1973), Ivan Turgenev (1977), and Anton Chekhov (1988).

Pritchett was appointed a Knight Bachelor in 1975 for "services to literature" and a Member of the Order of the Companions of Honour in 1993. His other awards included FRSL (1958), CBE (1968), the Heinemann Award (1969), the PEN Award (1974), the W.H. Smith Literary Award (1990) and the Golden PEN Award (1994). He was President of PEN International, the worldwide association of writers and the oldest human rights organisation from 1974 until 1976.

Sir V. S. Pritchett died of a stroke in London on 20 March 1997, aged 96.

== Bibliography ==
=== Short story collections ===
- The Spanish Virgin and Other Stories, 1932
- You Make Your Own Life, 1938
- It May Never Happen and Other Stories, 1945
- Collected Stories, 1956
- The Sailor, The Sense of Humour and Other Stories, 1956
- When My Girl Comes Home, 1961
- The Saint and Other Stories, 1966
- Blind Love, 1969
- The Camberwell Beauty, 1974
- Selected Stories, 1978
- On the Edge of the Cliff, 1979
- Collected Stories, 1982
- More Collected Stories, 1983
- A Careless Widow and Other Stories, 1989
- Complete Short Stories, 1990

=== Novels ===
- Clare Drummer, 1929
- Shirley Sanz, 1932
- Nothing Like Leather, 1935
- Dead Man Leading, 1937
- Mr Beluncle, 1951
- The Key to My Heart: A Comedy in Three Parts, 1963

=== Non-fiction ===
- Marching Spain, 1928
- This England, 1938 (editor)
- In My Good Books, 1942
- Novels and Stories by Robert Louis Stevenson, 1945 (editor)
- Build the Ships, 1946
- The Living Novel, 1946
- Turnstile One, 1948 (editor)
- Why Do I Write?: An Exchange of Views Between Elizabeth Bowen, Graham Greene, and V. S. Pritchett, 1948
- Books in General, 1953
- The Spanish Temper, 1954
- London Perceived, 1962 (photographs by Evelyn Hofer)
- Foreign Faces, 1964
- New York Proclaimed, 1965
- The Working Novelist, 1965
- Dublin: A Portrait, 1967
- A Cab at the Door, 1968
- George Meredith and English Comedy, 1970
- Midnight Oil, 1971
- Penguin Modern Stories, 1971 (with others)
- Balzac, 1973
- The Gentle Barbarian: the Life and Work of Turgenev, 1977
- The Myth Makers, 1979
- The Tale Bearers, 1980
- The Oxford Book of Short Stories, 1981 (editor)
- The Turn of the Years, 1982 (with R. Stone)
- The Other Side of a Frontier, 1984
- A Man of Letters, 1985
- Chekhov, 1988
- At Home and Abroad, 1990
- Lasting Impressions, 1990
- Complete Collected Essays, 1991
- The Pritchett Century, 1997

== Legacy ==
The V. S. Pritchett Memorial Prize was founded by the Royal Society of Literature at the beginning of the new millennium to commemorate the centenary of the birth of "an author widely regarded as the finest English short-story writer of the 20th century, and to preserve a tradition encompassing Pritchett's mastery of narrative". This prize is awarded annually, with up to £2,000 being given for the best unpublished short story of the year.

Perhaps his most prominent literary successor is the contemporary American writer Darin Strauss, who has written widely about Pritchett, and who worked to get Pritchett's 1951 novel Mr Beluncle back into print in America, providing a new introduction.

== See also ==
- Honoré de Balzac
- Royal Society of Literature

== General sources ==
- Baldwin, D. (1987). VS Pritchett..
- Epstein, Joseph (March 1993). "The enduring VS Pritchett". The New Criterion..
- Fulford, Robert (2 April 1997). "VS Pritchett". The Globe and Mail. Toronto, CA..
- Serafin, Steven R., ed. (1999). Encyclopedia of World Literature in the 20th Century. Vol. 3..
- Seymour-Smith, Martin; Kimmens, Andrew C (1996). World Authors 1900–1950. Vol. 3..
- Stinson, John J. (1992). VS Pritchett: A Study of the Short Fiction. New York: Twayne Publishers. ISBN 9780805783414..
- Treglown, Jeremy (2004). VS Pritchett: A Working Life. London: Chatto & Windus. ISBN 0-7011-7322-X..

Non-profit organization positions
Preceded by Heinrich Böll	International President of PEN International; 1974–1976	Succeeded by Mario Vargas Llosa
