= The Little Friend =

Novel by Donna Tartt

- First edition cover
- Author: Donna Tartt
- Cover artist: Chip Kidd
- Language: English
- Genre: Fiction
- Publisher: Knopf
- Publication date: October 22, 2002
- Publication place: United States
- Media type: Print (hardcover and paperback)
- Pages: 576
- ISBN: 0-679-43938-2
- OCLC: 49603052
- Dewey Decimal: 813/.54 21
- LC Class: PS3570.A657 L58 2002

The Little Friend is the second novel by the American author Donna Tartt. The novel was initially published by Alfred A. Knopf on October 22, 2002, a decade after her first novel, The Secret History.

The Little Friend follows a young girl, Harriet Cleve Dufresnes, living in Mississippi in the early 1970s. The story revolves around the unexplained death of Harriet's brother, Robin, who died by hanging in 1964 at the age of nine. The aftermath of this early tragedy, as well as the dynamics of Harriet's extended family serves as the principal focus of the novel, which explores a broad spectrum of perspectives and aspects of Southern life.

In an interview with The Guardian in 2002, Tartt stated that The Little Friend was intentionally different from The Secret History, stating: "I wanted to take on a completely different set of technical problems. The Secret History was all from the point of view of Richard, a single camera, but the new book is symphonic, like War and Peace. That's widely thought to be the most difficult form."

== Plot ==
In the mid-1960s, on Mother's Day, Robin, the nine-year-old son of the Dufresnes, a white family living in Mississippi, is found hanging from a tree on the family property. Robin's death—which is assumed to be murder—causes his mother, Charlotte, to sink into a listless depression and his father, Dixon, to abandon the family on the pretext of work.

Twelve years later Robin's two younger sisters, Allison and Harriet, are now sixteen and twelve years old, respectively. Harriet is considered particularly difficult as she is highly intelligent, but uncompromising. Harriet has developed a morbid fascination with her brother and with the past of her matrilineal family, the Cleves. Her great-grandfather, Judge Cleve, once owned the local mansion, "Tribulation", but lost the family's wealth in his declining years.

Harriet's fascination with her brother's death leads her to decide to find the murderer. She enlists the reluctant help of her younger but devoted friend, a boy, Hely Hull. The Dufresnes' stalwart black maid, Ida Rhew, reveals that Robin had a fight with another boy shortly before his death. Harriet discovers that the boy is Danny Ratliff, the son of a highly dysfunctional local methamphetamine-producing family. Farish Ratliff, an elder brother, runs the drug business with the help of Danny and with the connivance of his grandmother, Gum. Farish, not a particularly intelligent man, is planning a drug shipment hidden within a truck transporting venomous snakes, which another brother, Eugene, uses in his Evangelical preaching.

Harriet believes that Danny is the murderer and resolves to exact revenge by stealing a cobra kept by Eugene, and dropping it into Danny's Trans Am vehicle. Harriet is also distraught at her parents' dismissal of the much-loved Ida. After a near disastrous encounter with the Ratliffs when the brothers attempt to transport the drugs, Harriet and Hely manage to steal the cobra from Eugene's office. They proceed to drop the snake into the Trans Am from an abandoned road bridge but discover that the car was being driven, not by Danny, but by his grandmother, Gum, who is bitten and hospitalized. The Ratliffs deduce that Harriet was involved in the attack and seek her out after she returns early from summer camp following the death of her favourite great-aunt.

Danny resolves to steal some of his own family's drugs and use them to buy his way out of town. Danny knows that the drugs have been hidden in a water tower, where Harriet finds them and throws them into the water. Farish becomes increasingly deranged by the consumption of his own product and forces Danny to take him for a drive. Danny drives towards the water tower where he fatally shoots Farish.

After killing his brother, Danny discovers Harriet in the water tower and attempts to drown her. Harriet, who has been practicing holding her breath, pretends to drown but is able to escape when Danny falls back into the water. Harriet climbs out of the tank, but the ladder collapses behind her, leaving Danny in the tank. Later, he is discovered, arrested and charged with his brother's murder.

Harriet's father visits her in hospital while she is recovering from her ordeal. He reveals that Danny was Robin's "little friend" and was distraught when he heard of Robin's death. The authorities never discover Harriet and Hely's involvement with the Ratliffs, as her doctors consider her condition to be the result of an epileptic episode.

The novel ends with Robin's death still a mystery.

== Themes ==
In an interview with The Guardian in 2002, Tartt described The Little Friend as "a frightening, scary book about children coming into contact with the world of adults in a frightening way." Publishers Weekly commented: "If the theme of The Secret History was intellectual arrogance, here it is dangerous innocence." The Observer named a principal theme as one traditional in children's literature: "the mysterious unknowability of your parents' love either for yourself or for each other, the question of how much any of us will or will not therefore feel alone in the world for the rest of our lives."

Ruth Franklin of The New Republic highlighted Tartt's literary "obsess[ion] with crimes that go unpunished."

Happiness and methods of coping with tragedy are explored throughout the book, as are: guilt; coming-of-age; obsession, as well as "misunderstanding, bereavement, solitude and... cruelty."

Christianity is referenced throughout the book in the form of snake handling preachers, Baptists, and Mormonism, as well as an epigraph attributed to Saint Thomas Aquinas.

== Cover design ==
The jacket design is by Chip Kidd, a New York City book cover designer.

== Reception ==
The novel won the WH Smith Literary Award and was shortlisted for the Orange Prize for Fiction in 2003.

Publication was highly anticipated, but reviews were mixed: A. O. Scott of The New York Times described the book as "tragic, fever-dream realism," although Entertainment Weekly criticizes the "inconsistent" characterization and describes the style as "bad Faulkner."

The Guardian praised the "energy of the prose" and Tartt's "accurate ear for dialogue," whilst criticizing the novel's unevenness. The London Review of Books called it: "thrilling stuff, and viscerally involving; but at the same time... emotionally unengaging," criticizing the apparent invulnerability of Harriet's character, and comparing it to "Alien, without the cat."

Publishers Weekly gave the novel a starred review, saying: "Tartt's second novel confirms her talent as a superb storyteller."
