= WH Smith Literary Award =

Prize originally for Commonwealth residents, awarded 1959–2005

The WH Smith Literary Award was an award founded in 1959 by British high street retailer WH Smith to "encourage and bring international esteem to authors of the British Commonwealth". Originally open to all residents of the UK, the Commonwealth and Ireland, it later admitted foreign works in translation and works by US authors. The final three winners were Americans (Philip Roth, Donna Tartt and Richard Powers), and 2005 was the award's final year.

The WH Smith Illustration Award ran from 1987 to 1994.

The WH Smith Mind-Boggling Book Award for children's literature ran from 1993 to 1996.

WH Smith sponsors the National Book Awards Children's Book of the Year (the "British Children's Book Award" through 2009).

== Winners ==
Year	Author	Title
1959	Patrick White	Voss
1960	Laurie Lee	Cider With Rosie
1961	Nadine Gordimer	Friday's Footprint
1962	J. R. Ackerley	We Think the World of You
1963	Gabriel Fielding	The Birthday King
1964	Ernst Gombrich	Meditations on a Hobby-Horse
1965	Leonard Woolf	Beginning Again
1966	R. C. Hutchinson	A Child Possessed
1967	Jean Rhys	Wide Sargasso Sea
1968	V. S. Naipaul	The Mimic Men
1969	Robert Gittings	John Keats
1970	John Fowles	The French Lieutenant's Woman
1971	Nan Fairbrother	New Lives, New Landscapes
1972	Kathleen Raine	The Lost Country
1973	Brian Moore	Catholics
1974	Anthony Powell	Temporary Kings
1975	Jon Stallworthy	Wilfred Owen
1976	Seamus Heaney	North
1977	Ronald Lewin	Slim: The Standardbearer
1978	Patrick Leigh Fermor	A Time of Gifts
1979	Mark Girouard	Life in the English Country House
1980	Thom Gunn	Selected Poems 1950–1975
1981	Isabel Colegate	The Shooting Party
1982	George Clare	Last Waltz in Vienna
1983	A. N. Wilson	Wise Virgin
1984	Philip Larkin	Required Writing
1985	David Hughes	The Pork Butcher
1986	Doris Lessing	The Good Terrorist
1987	Elizabeth Jennings	Collected Poems 1953–1985
1988	Robert Hughes	The Fatal Shore
1989	Christopher Hill	A Turbulent, Seditious and Factious People: John Bunyan and His Church
1990	V. S. Pritchett	A Careless Widow and Other Stories
1991	Derek Walcott	Omeros
1992	Thomas Pakenham	The Scramble for Africa
1993	Michèle Roberts	Daughters of the House
1994	Vikram Seth	A Suitable Boy
1995	Alice Munro	Open Secrets
1996	Simon Schama	Landscape and Memory
1997	Orlando Figes	A People's Tragedy: The Russian Revolution 1891–1924
1998	Ted Hughes	Tales from Ovid
1999	Beryl Bainbridge	Master Georgie
2000	Melvyn Bragg	The Soldier's Return
2001	Philip Roth	The Human Stain
2002	Ian McEwan	Atonement
2003	Donna Tartt	The Little Friend
2004	Richard Powers	The Time of Our Singing
2005	Philip Roth	The Plot Against America

== WH Smith Mind-Boggling Book Award ==
For a few years, W H Smith also offered a children's book award. The judges were children between nine and twelve, and the intention was to promote books which were "accessible to children in content and price, as well as offering a gripping read."

The winners were:

- 1993: Philip Ridley, Krindlekrax
- 1994: Malorie Blackman, Hacker
- 1995: Maggie Prince, Memoirs of a Dangerous Alien
- 1996: Sharon Creech, Walk Two Moons
