= Last Waltz in Vienna =

1982 book by George Clare

Last Waltz in Vienna: The Destruction of a Family 1842–1942
- Author: George Clare
- Genre: Biography, family history, testimony
- Publisher: Verlag Ullstein GmbH (German edition), Macmillan (English edition)
- Publication date: 1980 (German edition), 1981 (English edition)
- Awards: The WH Smith Literary Award 1982
- ISBN: 9780030604065

Last Waltz in Vienna by George Clare (21 December 1920 – 26 March 2009) was the 1982 winner of the WH Smith Literary Award.

The book, first published in German in 1980 as Das waren die Klaars and published in English in 1981 with a subtitle of The Rise and Destruction of a Family, 1842–1942, later just The Destruction of a Family, 1842–1942, tells the history and fate of Clare's family - the Klaars and the Schapiras, who were proudly Austrian and also happened to be Jewish.

Clare's book describes Vienna in the 19th century and his own coming-of-age in the city as the only child of Ernst and Stella (nee Ernestine Schapira).

As a 17-year-old, he was living at Flat 9, Pichlergasse 1 in Vienna when the Anschluss was announced and describes the immediate impact as the radio delivered the news:

They played the national anthem. After the last bars of Haydn's tune we all sat in utter silence for a few moments. Then, before any of us had had a chance to say anything, the sounds of hundreds of men shouting at the top of their voices could be heard. Still indistinct, still distant, it sounded threatening none the less. Those raucous voices grew louder, were coming closer. I rushed to the window and looked out into Nussdorferstrasse. It was still quite empty. A few moments. Then the first lorry came into sight. It was packed with shouting, screaming men. A huge swastika flag fluttered over their heads.

Due to the restrictions placed on Jewish people, Ernst Klaar lost his job at the Austrian Länderbank. George and his parents left Austria and tried to relocate to the Republic of Ireland via Berlin as they needed to deal directly with the Irish embassy. George and his mother reached Ireland, but George relocated to Britain and enlisted in the army, while his parents moved to Paris where his father had been offered a job at the Banque des Pays.

After the fall of France, Clare's parents were arrested in St Pierreville in 1942 by the Vichy authorities and taken to the Drancy internment camp, then transported to Auschwitz where they were murdered. When in 1974, George travelled to the village that had hidden them, he discovered that the warrant was for Ernst alone, and that his mother had voluntarily accompanied his father.

The author changed his name while serving as a volunteer in the British Army in World War II, first in the Pioneer Corps and later the Royal Artillery, and chose George Clare, as an anglicised version of his original name, Georg Klaar.

The book was translated into six languages and was the subject of an Arena BBC television documentary.

Clare dedicated the book to his parents and to his own four children.
