= The Soldier's Return =

Novel by Melvyn Bragg

- First edition
- Author: Melvyn Bragg
- Language: English
- Series: The Soldier's Return
- Publisher: Hodder and Stoughton
- Publication date: 1999
- Publication place: United Kingdom
- Media type: Print (Paperback)
- ISBN: 978-0-340-76727-6
- Followed by: The Soldier's Return

The Soldier's Return is the first novel in a quartet written by Melvyn Bragg.

== Plot summary ==
Sam Richardson returns to the small Cumbrian town of Wigton after fighting in Burma during the Second World War. The war has given Sam’s wife Ellen a newfound confidence and Sam is a stranger to his son Joe. Sam is plagued by memories of the war and wants a new life, for himself, his wife and his son.

The book won the WH Smith Literary Award in 2000, and was followed by three sequels.

== Sequels ==
=== A Son of War (2001) ===
Sam Richardson is still struggling with effects of World War Two and to re-establish his relationship with his wife Ellen and young son Joe. Sam wants to become his own boss and start a business.

=== Crossing the Lines (2003) ===
Joe Richardson is changing from an immature schoolboy into a confident student at Oxford who has the world at his feet. His parents Sam and Ellen have reconciled some of their difficulties and are drifting into middle-age.

=== Remember Me... (2008) ===
Joe, still at Oxford, meets French art student Natasha. The story of their love and lives has been described as both "semi-autobiographical" and "nakedly autobiographical".
