= Stephen Rowe Bradley House =

Historic house in New Hampshire, United States

- U.S. National Register of Historic Places
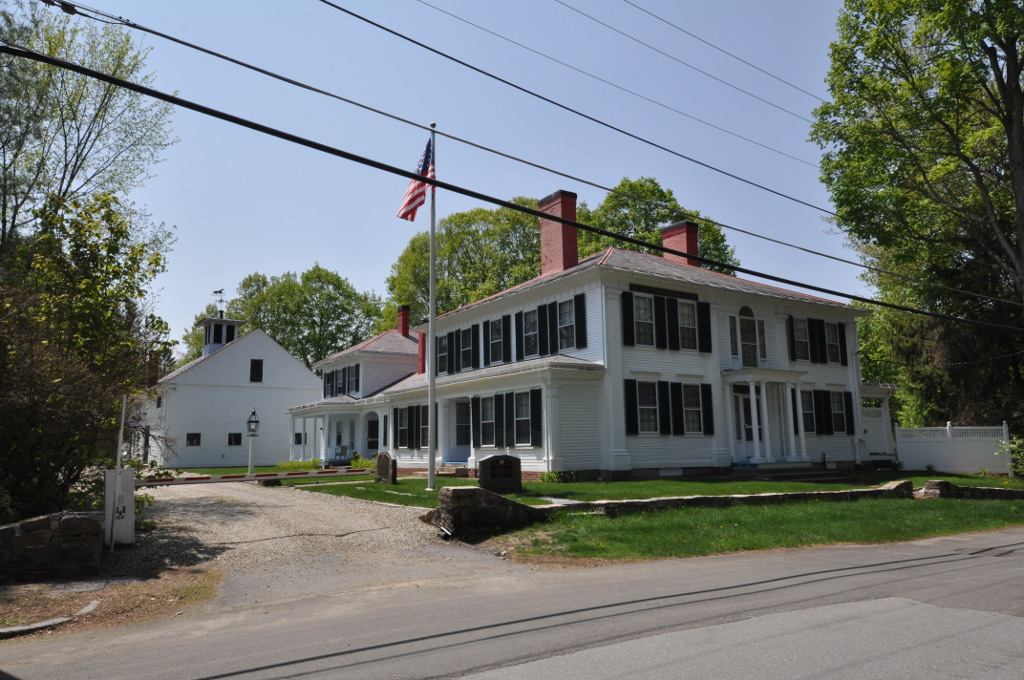

- Location within New Hampshire Location within the United States
- Location: 43 Westminster St., Walpole, New Hampshire
- Coordinates: 43°4′46″N 72°25′49″W
- Area: 4.9 acres (2.0 ha)
- Built: 1808
- Architectural style: Federal
- NRHP reference No.: 05001445
- Added to NRHP: December 22, 2005

The Stephen Rowe Bradley House is a historic house at 43 Westminster Street in Walpole, New Hampshire. The large Federal style mansion house was built c. 1808 for Francis Gardner, a lawyer and state legislator. From 1817 to 1830 it was the home of Stephen Rowe Bradley, a Vermont lawyer, judge, and politician, who played a significant role in Vermont's entry into the United States as the fourteenth state, representing the independent Vermont Republic in negotiations over its boundaries. This house is the only known surviving location associated with Bradley's life. The house was listed on the National Register of Historic Places in 2005.

== Description and history ==
The Stephen Rowe Bradley House is located on the south side of Westminster Street on the west side of Walpole's village center; the road was one that historically led to the nearby bridge over the Connecticut River, but is now dead ended before reaching New Hampshire Route 12.

The house is a large 2 1/2-story wood-frame structure, with a hip roof, two interior brick chimneys, and a clapboarded exterior. The main block is extended to the rear by a single-story kitchen ell and a two-story servants' wing. An early 19th-century barn stands behind the house. The house has fine Federal period styling, including pilasters on the main facade at the corners and flanking the central bay. The main entrance is flanked by engaged columns and is sheltered by a portico supported by slender round columns. A Palladian window is set above the entrance.

The house was built about 1808 for Francis Gardner, a local lawyer and politician. It was purchased in 1817 by Stephen Rowe Bradley, and remained his home in the later years of his life. Bradley was a three-time United States Senator from Vermont, and played a critical role in Vermont's entry to the United States, serving as the attorney general for the Vermont Republic during negotiations in the 1780s. The house is the only surviving building left with significant personal association to him, and was (as of its listing on the National Register in 2005) still in the hands of his descendants.

From 1901 to 1913, the house was owned by Fanny Peabody Mason.

== See also ==
- National Register of Historic Places listings in Cheshire County, New Hampshire
