= The Sailor (short story) =

1945 short story by V. S. Pritchett

- Short story by V. S. Pritchett
- Country: United States
- Language: English

Publication
- Publisher: Chatto & Windus
- Media type: Print
- Publication date: 1945

"The Sailor" is a short story by V. S. Pritchett first collected in It May Never Happen and Other Stories (1945) published by Chatto & Windus.

The story is among Pritchett's most anthologized works from his oeuvre.

== Plot ==
The story is presented as a first-person narrative.

The narrator, an unnamed man of education, encounters a once able-bodied seaman, invalided by the maritime union due to his ill-health. Formerly a ship's cook, Albert Edward Thompson has been working odd jobs for the past two years. The man is utterly lost and bewildered on land and is unable to adjust to his new condition as a landlubber. When Thompson emphatically declines to imbibe an alcoholic beverage, the puritan-like narrator assumes the sailor as a kindred spirit.

The narrator resides in a modest bungalow in a semi-rural suburb in Whitechapel. As a confirmed bachelor, he lives an Oblomovian existence, and offers the former seaman a job as a factotum and companion. Albert accepts the position with alacrity, and proceeds to wash and polish the entire cottage, transforming the kitchen into a galley where he presides as chief cook. Albert's speech is peppered with nautical terms, and addresses the narrator as "sir." Both men at first appear to be content with this domestic arrangement.

The narrator's nearest neighbor lives in a rundown cottage: she is reputedly the daughter of an army colonel. Perhaps in her late twenties, pretty and petite, she spends her solitary days chain-smoking cigarettes, gardening, and listening to popular music on a gramophone. An alcoholic, her visits to the local pub have earned the woman a reputation for hard-drinking and blasphemous obscenities. A nervous condition causes her right eyebrow to flutter, which resembles a salacious wink. She is avowedly averse to sex and, like the narrator, celibate.

The narrator insists that Albert take a day off and visit the town. Albert returns after dark after wandering aimlessly all day. The next morning the colonel's daughter informs the narrator that Albert was mistaken for a sexual predator when he had followed a woman on the town commons, hoping she would lead him home. She berates the narrator for sending off unsupervised his apparently anti-social manservant.

Albert's aversion to all forms of temptation compels him to compulsively preach abstinence to everyone he meets when running his errands. He also divulges details concerning the narrator's personal business.

The colonel's daughter and Albert unexpectedly appear late at night at the narrator's bungalow. Intoxicated, they clearly have been sexually intimate. Neither of them appears to be fazed by this deviation from their professed strictures to avoid temptation.

The narrator, appalled at Albert's behavior, retreats into his thoughts as he wanders through a moonlit forest. Though the stars shine brightly, he registers images of death: "There was a sour smell at the end of the wood, where, no doubt, a dead rabbit or pigeon was rotting."

== Critical appraisal ==
The opening paragraph introduces the sailor, Albert Edward Thomson, "probably the most memorable of all Pritchett's eccentrics."

He was lifting his knees high and holding his hands up, when I first saw him, as if, crossing the road through the stinging rain, he was breaking through the beaded curtain of a Pernambuco bar. I knew he was going to stop me. This part of the Euston road is a beat of the men who want a cup of tea or their fare to a job in Luton or some outlying town. "Beg pardon, chum," he said in an anxious, hot-potato voice. "Is that Whitechapel?"

Pritchett, commenting on the story in a 1979 Washington Post interview, said "My early short story 'The Sailor' was done when I was about 30. I first wrote it in the third person, then from the god's eye viewpoint. I then discarded the draft and reworked it in first person. Rewriting always improves writing."

== Theme ==
Pritchett approaches the central theme of the narrator's "moral revelation" through a circuitous examination of appearance vs. reality and order vs. disorder.

Pritchett gains significant thematic and aesthetic effects by strategically allowing his characters suddenly and convincingly to reveal third dimensions, reinforcing ideas emerging from the story's center about the ways in which people are guilty of undervaluing human complexity, ambiguity and dignity in others.

The story's initial framing of the former ship's cook, Albert Edward Thompson, as merely a Dickensian social type is soon undermined: Pritchett's "lovable old salt" is not a two-dimensional character. Neither is he a mere eccentric.

Similarly, the narrator's misapprehension as to the character of his neighbor, the so-called "Colonel's daughter" follows the same trajectory. Rather than 25-years-of-age, she is actually thirty-nine, and not the offspring of a commissioned officer, but that of a sergeant-major. Her avowed celibacy is less than ironclad, nor is Thompson's professed abstinence from alcohol. When these two "eccentrics" appear at the narrator's bungalow one evening—cheerfully intoxicated and physically intimate —the narrator's commitment to his own social desolation is exposed. As to whether the narrator undergoes an epiphany that will free him from his puritanism and social alienation is never explicitly revealed. Stinson writes:

Pritchett refuses to sacrifice the complex and even paradoxical truths of the world, or the contingent nature of events, for the sake of a neat ending. Whether Thompson and narrator turn out to be more foils than doubles is a question that can be argued vigorously on either side.

Stinson adds: "Some readers will find the theme unresolved; others will find it nicely understated."

== Sources ==
- Stinson, John J. 1992. V. S. Pritchett: A Study of the Short Fiction. Twayne Publishers, New York. G. K. Hall & Co., Gordon Weaver, General Editor. ISBN 0-8057-8341-5
- Prichett, V. S. 1982. Preface to Collected Stories. Random House. ISBN 978-0679402152
