= Donna Tartt =

American novelist and writer

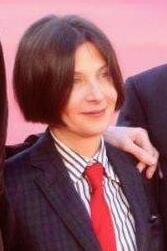
- Tartt in 2015
- Born: December 23, 1963 (age 62); Greenwood, Mississippi, U.S.
- Education: University of Mississippi; Bennington College (BA)
- Occupation: Fiction writer
- Writing career
- Period: 1992–present
- Notable works: The Secret History (1992); The Little Friend (2002); The Goldfinch (2013)
- Notable awards: WH Smith Literary Award 2003 The Little Friend; Pulitzer Prize for Fiction 2014 The Goldfinch; Andrew Carnegie Medal for Excellence in Fiction 2014 The Goldfinch
- Movement: Literary fiction
- Donna Tartt's voice from the BBC Radio 4 programme Front Row.

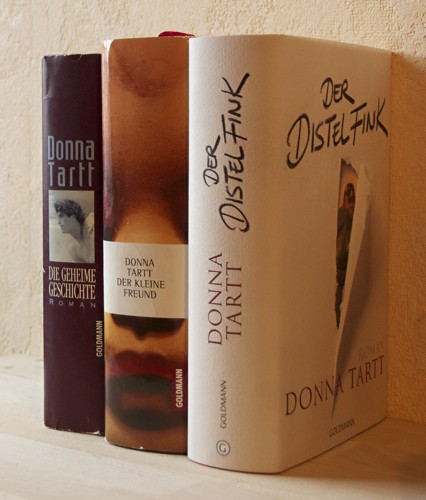
Tartt's three novels in German, published by Goldmann.

Donna Louise Tartt (born December 23, 1963) is an American novelist. She wrote the novels The Secret History (1992), The Little Friend (2002), and The Goldfinch (2013), which won the Pulitzer Prize for Fiction and was adapted into a 2019 film of the same name. She was included in Time magazine's 2014 "100 Most Influential People" list.

== Early life and education ==
Donna Louise Tartt was born on December 23, 1963, to Don and Taylor Tartt, in Greenwood, Mississippi. She was raised in the nearby town of Grenada. Her father, Don Tartt, was a rockabilly musician, turned freeway "service station owner-cum-local politician", while her mother, Taylor, was a secretary. Her parents were avid readers, and her mother would read while driving. As a child, Tartt memorized "really long poems by A. A. Milne", and has described herself as "this sort of horrible repository of doggerel verse".

Tartt wrote her first poem in 1968, when she was five years old. She was first published at 13, when a sonnet was included in a 1976 edition of the Mississippi Review. In high school, she was a freshman cheerleader for the basketball team and worked in the public library. Tartt's essays about patriotism and alcoholism won prizes, and she also wrote "short stories about death" during this period.

In 1981, Tartt enrolled in the University of Mississippi, where she pledged for the Kappa Kappa Gamma sorority and wrote short stories for The Daily Mississippian. An editor at the paper gave one of her stories to prominent writer Willie Morris, who found Tartt at the Holiday Inn bar one evening and declared her "a genius". Following a recommendation from Morris, Barry Hannah, then an Ole Miss writer-in-residence, admitted the 18-year-old Tartt into his graduate course on the short story. Hannah referred to her as "deeply literary" and "a literary star".

In 1982, following the suggestion of Morris and others, she transferred to Bennington College. At Bennington, Tartt studied classics with Claude Fredericks, and met fellow students and future authors Bret Easton Ellis, Jonathan Lethem, and Jill Eisenstadt. Tartt graduated in 1986 with a degree in philosophy.

== Career ==
Donna Tartt has spent about ten years writing each of her novels. Her biggest influences as a writer include famous 20th-century authors such as Evelyn Waugh, George Orwell, Shirley Jackson, Patricia Highsmith and Vladimir Nabokov.

The Secret History (1992) was derived from her time at Bennington College. She spent eight years writing. Amanda Urban was her agent and the novel became a critical and financial success. It originated the dark academia literary aesthetic, causing it to "explode like a firework" in the literary scene, according to The New York Times.

Tartt's novel The Little Friend (2002) was first published in Dutch because her books sold more per capita in the Netherlands than elsewhere.

In 2006, Tartt's short story "The Ambush" was included in the Best American Short Stories 2006.

Her 2013 novel The Goldfinch was a bestseller and received the 2014 Pulitzer Prize for Fiction, though some critics felt the novel was juvenile and not literary. The book was adapted into the movie The Goldfinch, which was a critical and commercial failure. Tartt was not given the option to write the screenplay or act as a producer for the film, and reportedly fired longtime agent Amanda Urban over the deal.

In November 2023, The Queen's Reading Room released an interview with Tartt in which she confirmed that she was working on her next novel.

== Personal life ==
In 2002, it was reported that Tartt had lived in Greenwich Village, the Upper East Side, and on a farm near Charlottesville, Virginia. She has stated that she will never marry. In a 2013 interview with The Irish Independent, Tartt stated that she dislikes going on book tours and giving talks, because she finds them mentally exhausting. She stressed that she was not a recluse but rather was maintaining her privacy, and asked rhetorically, "Was it Emerson who talked about the great freedom of American life as the freedom not to participate in the life of the culture, the freedom to shut the door, to close the curtains?"

As of 2016, Tartt lived with art gallery owner Neal Guma in Charlottesville, Virginia, on a property they purchased together in 1997. The dedication of Tartt's second novel is "For Neal".

Tartt is a convert to Catholicism and contributed an essay, "The Spirit and Writing in a Secular World", to The Novel, Spirituality and Modern Culture (2000), edited by Paul Fiddes. In her essay she wrote that "faith is vital in the process of making my work and in the reasons I am driven to make it". However, Tartt also warned of the danger of writers who impose their beliefs or convictions on their novels. She wrote that writers should "shy from asserting those convictions directly in their work".

== Awards ==
- 2003 WH Smith Literary Award – The Little Friend
- 2003 Orange Prize for Fiction shortlist – The Little Friend
- 2013 National Book Critics Circle Award (fiction) shortlist – The Goldfinch
- 2014 Baileys Women's Prize for Fiction shortlist – The Goldfinch
- 2014 Pulitzer Prize for Fiction – The Goldfinch
- 2014 Time 100 Most Influential People
- 2014 Andrew Carnegie Medal for Excellence for Fiction – The Goldfinch
- 2014 Vanity Fair International Best Dressed List

== Works ==
=== Novels ===
- The Secret History (1992, Alfred A. Knopf)
- The Little Friend (2002, Alfred A. Knopf)
- The Goldfinch (2013, Little, Brown)

=== Short stories ===
- "Tam-O'-Shanter", The New Yorker, April 19, 1993, pp. 90–91
- "A Christmas Pageant", Harper's Magazine, 287.1723, December 1993, pp. 45–51
- "A Garter Snake", GQ, 65.5, May 1995, pp. 89ff
- "The Ambush", The Guardian, June 25, 2005; reprinted in The Best American Short Stories 2006

=== Nonfiction ===
- "Sleepytown: A Southern Gothic Childhood, with Codeine", Harper's Magazine 285.1706, July 1992, pp. 60–66
- "Basketball Season", Oxford American, Issue 2, Fall 1992; reprinted in The Best American Sports Writing 1993, ed. Frank Deford, Houghton Mifflin, 1993, under the title "Basketball Season: Requiem of a Mississippi Cheerleader"
- "Team Spirit: Memories of Being a Freshman Cheerleader for the Basketball Team", Harper's Magazine 288.1727, April 1994, pp. 37–40
- "In Melbourne", Oxford American, Issue 6, March/April 1995
- "Willie Morris (1934–1999)", a tribute, Oxford American, Issue 29, September/October 1999
- "Spirituality in the Modern Novel", Oxford American, Issue 30, November/December 1999; published in book form as "The Spirit and Writing in a Secular World" in Fiddes, Paul S., ed. (2000). The Novel, Spirituality and Modern Culture: Eight Novelists Write about Their Craft and Their Context. Darton, Longman & Todd / University of Wales Press. pp. 25–40.
- "My friend, my mentor, my inspiration", in Remembering Willie. University Press of Mississippi. 2000. ISBN 978-1-57806-267-6.
- "The Glory of J. F. Powers", Harper's Magazine, July 2000
- "Spanish Grandeur in Mississippi" (Art Views column), Oxford American, Issue 41, Fall 2001
- "Early Times in Mississippi", in the collective feature "Ode to Bourbon", Garden & Gun, Holiday 2007
- "Donna Tartt on the Singular Voice, and Pungent Humor, of Charles Portis", The New York Times Book Review, June 9, 2020 (online); published in print as "True Grit", The New York Times Book Review, June 28, 2020, p. 1
- "Art and Artifice", Harper's Magazine, July 2024

=== Introductions and contributions ===
- "True Crime" (poem), in Penzler, Otto, ed. (1996). Murder for Love. Delacorte Press. ISBN 978-0-385-31466-4.
- "Editor's Choice: Erin Parish" (essay on the painter Erin Parish), Bomb, no. 56, Summer 1996
- Catalog essay for Into the Blue Again, solo exhibition by Erin Parish, Jeffrey Coploff Fine Art, New York, 1997
- "Portfolio: William Eggleston", Artforum International, vol. 40, no. 2, October 2001, p. 135
- Introduction to Portis, Charles (2005). True Grit. Bloomsbury Publishing.; reprinted as "Afterword" in the Overlook Press 2010 edition, pp. 255–267, ISBN 978-1-59020-459-7
- Contribution to Pen Meets Paint: 200 Years Mauritshuis, 200 Writers, 200 Paintings, Waanders Publishers / Mauritshuis, 2022, ISBN 9789462623811
- Introduction to Martel, J. F. (2024). Reclaiming Art in the Age of Artifice. Counterpoint Press / Basic Books. ISBN 978-1-5416-0724-8.

=== Audiobooks read by Tartt ===
==== Works by Tartt ====
- The Secret History
- The Little Friend (abridged)
- The Goldfinch

==== Works by others ====
- True Grit by Charles Portis (Recorded Books, 2006) — read by Tartt, with her essay on the novel as afterword
- Winesburg, Ohio by Sherwood Anderson (HarperAudio, 2003) — selections, in a multi-narrator edition with Richard Ford, Paul Auster, Russell Banks, Tobias Wolff, and Daniel Halpern

== General references ==
- Hargreaves, Tracy (2001). Donna Tartt's "The Secret History". New York and London: Continuum International Publishing Group. ISBN 0-8264-5320-1.
- Kakutani, Michiko (1992). "Students Indulging in Course of Destruction". The New York Times, September 4, 1992.
- Kaplan, James (September 1992). "Smart Tartt". Vanity Fair.
- McOran-Campbell, Adrian (August 2000). The Secret History.
- Tartt, Donna (2000). "Spanish Grandeur in Mississippi". Oxford American, Fall 2001.
- Yee, Danny (1994). "Studying Ancient Greek Warps the Mind of the Young?"
- Corrigan, Yuri (December 1, 2018). "Donna Tartt's Dostoevsky: Trauma and the Displaced Self". Comparative Literature. 70 (4): 392–407. doi:10.1215/00104124-7215462. S2CID 165480509.
