= The Spanish Virgin and Other Stories =

Collection of short fiction

- First edition cover
- Author: V. S. Pritchett
- Publisher: Ernest Benn Limited
- Publication date: 1930
- Media type: Print (hardback)
- OCLC: 5792928

The Spanish Virgin and Other Stories is V. S. Pritchett's first collection of short fiction and marks the beginning of his professional career as a writer. The 13 stories were published in 1930 by Ernest Benn Limited, London.

The volume represents the then 29–year-old author's apprentice efforts. As such, they have not appeared in subsequent collections of his mature collected short fiction: "Pritchett consistently decided to leave unresurrected the stories of The Spanish Virgin."

== Stories ==
- "The Spanish Virgin"
- "Tragedy in a Greek Theatre"
- "The White Rabbit"
- "Fishy"
- "The Corsican Inn"
- "The Petrol Dump"
- "The Haunted Room"
- "Rain in the Sierra"
- 'The Sack of Lights"
- "The Cuckoo Clock"
- "The Gnats"

== Reception ==
Biographer John J. Stinson reports that Pritchett was "embarrassed" by the novella-length title story, but the volume nonetheless garnered a glowing review from an anonymous critic in the Times Literary Supplement. The "flattering" critique prompted modest sales for The Spanish Virgin, and likely encouraged Pritchett to pursue the short story form after the disappointing response to his second novel, Clare Drummer (1929).

Literary critic Edward J. O'Brien selected "Tragedy in a Greek Theatre" for the 1927 Best Short Stories of the Year.

== Retrospective appraisal ==
Pritchett, in his Preface to Collected Stories (1982) explained his reasons for exempting the stories in The Spanish Virgin from his retrospective collections:

I began, in those early days, by writing anecdotal sketches of real people, because the newspapers liked that kind of thing...[I] had not yet found a distinctive voice which is indispensable to the short-story writer and the poet.

== Sources ==
- Stinson, John J. 1992. V. S. Pritchett: A Study of the Short Fiction. Twayne Publishers, New York. G. K. Hall & Co., Gordon Weaver, General Editor. ISBN 0-8057-8341-5
- Prichett, V. S.. 1930. The Spanish Virgin and Other Stories. Ernest Benn Limited, London. OCLC 5792928
- Prichett, V. S.. 1982. Preface to Collected Stories. Random House. ISBN 978-0679402152
