= George Clare (writer) =

UK-Austrian journalist (1920–2009)

George Peter Clare (né Georg Klaar) (21 December 1920 – 26 March 2009) was a British author and journalist of Jewish descent, who left his native Austria as a teenager following the Anschluss with Germany. He wrote two books which are testimonials of his experiences in Europe, Last Waltz in Vienna and Berlin Days. Last Waltz won the 1982 WH Smith Literary Award.

== Biography ==
George Clare was born in Vienna in 1920. Both of his parents were Jewish. His father, Ernst Klaar, worked for the Austrian Länderbank. His mother was Ernestine Schapira, known as Stella.

Ernst came from a family of doctors. His grandfather was an army surgeon and the first Jew to reach a high military rank. The Klaars were an assimilated family who regarded themselves as Austrian first and foremost. Clare wrote in Last Waltz:

'I was already second-generation Viennese, and Viennese-born Jews felt resentment towards the less assimilated Jews from the east. We were, or rather thought we were, quite different from that bearded, caftaned lot.'

Clare lived at Flat 9, Pichlergasse 1 in Vienna and had a comfortable life until the Anschluss, visiting relatives, holidays in Bad Ischl and taking part in Viennese city life including attending a spectacular ball in the Konzerthaus.

Following the Anschluss, Clare and his parents left Austria via Berlin, a journey that Clare recounts in Last Waltz. Clare and his mother initially relocated to the Republic of Ireland, but he moved to Britain as he wanted to join the army and fight in Europe, and she joined her husband in Paris. Both of his parents were arrested by the Vichy regime, and died in Auschwitz. His grandmother died in the Theresienstadt Ghetto and his uncle, Paul Klaar worked as a doctor there and committed suicide shortly after the war.

Clare enlisted in the British Army, first in the Pioneer Corps and then in the Royal Artillery, where his postings included 137 Battery, 117 Field Regiment near Thetford, Norfolk. Due to the restrictions on foreign personnel, he did not see active service overseas during the war. After war ended his German language skills were put to use in the British Information Services Control Intelligence Section, part of the Control Commission for Germany. He was naturalised as a British citizen in 1947.

After his service, he worked as a news editor for many years, including for Axel Springer AG.

He lived in Dalham, Suffolk, from 1984 until 2005 when he returned to London suffering from vascular dementia.

In 2005 he was awarded an honorary doctorate by NUI Galway.

George was married to Lisl Beck, his childhood girlfriend and fellow refugee, from 1939 until the marriage was dissolved in 1964; they had one son and two daughters. He went on to marry his Foreign News Service secretary, Christel Vorbringer, in 1965 and they had one daughter. They remained married until his death.

George Clare died on 26 March 2009, aged 88.

== Books ==
Last Waltz in Vienna, first published in German as Das waren die Klaars and published in English in 1981 with a subtitle of The Rise and Destruction of a Family, 1842–1942, later just The Destruction of a Family, 1842–1942 is considered a masterpiece of family history and won the WH Smith Literary Award in 1982. In it, Clare tells the story of his Viennese family and his childhood and life as a Jew in Vienna. As a 17-year-old, he describes how the Anschluss and Hitler's rise to power affected life in Vienna. It also tells of his escape to Ireland where he married fellow refugee Lisl Beck. The book bears witness to his parents' death in Auschwitz and his own, complex feelings of guilt about whether his own actions had a bearing on their decision to remain in Occupied France. The book and Clare's story was made the focus for an episode of the TV documentary series Arena, broadcast on 11 January 1983.

In Berlin Days 1946–1947 (1989) he recounts his work at the British Information Services Control Intelligence Section part of the Control Commission for Germany, first as a sergeant and then as British civilian officer. Clare became skilled in identifying lies and omissions in the Fragebogen questionnaires that the Allies occupying Germany put in place to 'denazify' public life. Berlin Days recounts his visit to Baldur von Schirach, imprisoned in Spandau, the difficulties surrounding the denazification of Wilhelm Furtwängler, and the career of Hugh Greene, controller of broadcasting in the British-occupied zone and later Director-General of the BBC.
