= The Camberwell Beauty and Other Stories =

- The Camberwell Beauty (Random House edition)
- Publisher: Chatto & Windus, Random House
- Publication date: 1974
- Media type: Print (hardback)
- Pages: 211 (Random House)
- ISBN: 978-0394492223

The Camberwell Beauty and Other Stories is a collection of nine works of short fiction by V. S. Pritchett first published in 1974 by Chatto & Windus and by Random House.

The stories originally appeared individually in periodicals, including The New Yorker, Playboy and Encounter [See Stories section below].

== Stories ==
The date, where available, and journal of original publication are indicated:

- "The Camberwell Beauty" The New Yorker
- "The Marvellous Girl" The New Yorker, December 24, 1973
- "The Lady From Guatemala" Playboy
- "Did You Invite Me?" Playboy, June 1974
- "The Last Throw" Encounter
- "The Spree" Playboy, December 1973
- "The Diver" (originally published in The New Yorker as "The Fall"), May 28, 1960
- "Our Wife" (originally published in The New Yorker as "The Captain’s Daughter"), December 27, 1969
- "The Rescue" The New Yorker, April 14, 1973

== Reception ==
Penelope Mortimer in the New York Times identifies Pritchett's "minor literary genre" represented in the volume and its perennial cast of characters and themes: "[S]eedy antique dealers and Sunday sailors, adulterous academics, a confused editor of a leftwing periodical, an unlikely film director, lonely people with dogs; old age and remembered childhood."

Times literary critic Anatole Eroyard contends that Pritchett has "given up exploring motives and illustrating characters as being too simple, unworthy of the name of art" and, as such, the characters remain largely an unsolved "mystery." Eroyard writes:

Whether these stories "succeed" or not, most of them are "readable" at the very least. Perhaps this readability derives from their "mystery"—even if we never come to understand it.

He adds: "The stories give you a few clues and the rest is up to you."

Novelist and short story writer Eudora Welty in the New York Times offered this assessment of the collection:

Each story's truth is distilled by Pritchett through a pure concentration of human character...The paradoxes, the stratagems, the escapes, the entanglements, the humors and dreams, are all projections of the individual human being, all by himself alone. In its essence, Pritchett's work, so close to fantasy, is deeply true to life.
