= The Secret History =

1992 novel by Donna Tartt

- Cover of the first edition
- Author: Donna Tartt
- Cover artist: Chip Kidd; Barbara de Wilde
- Language: English
- Genre: Inverted detective story
- Publisher: Alfred A. Knopf
- Publication date: September 16, 1992
- Publication place: United States
- Media type: Print (hardback & paperback)
- Pages: 544 pp
- ISBN: 0-679-41032-5
- OCLC: 26515217
- Dewey Decimal: 813/.54 20
- LC Class: PS3570.A657 S4 1992

The Secret History is the first novel by the American author Donna Tartt, published by Alfred A. Knopf in September 1992. A campus novel, it tells the story of a closely knit group of six Classics students at Hampden College, a small, elite liberal arts college in Vermont.

The Secret History is an inverted detective story narrated by one of the six students, Richard Papen, who reflects years later upon the situation that led to the murder of their friend Edmund "Bunny" Corcoran. The events leading up to the murder are revealed sequentially. The novel explores the circumstances and lasting effects of Bunny's death on the academically and socially isolated group of Classics students of which he was a part.

The novel was originally titled The God of Illusions, and its first-edition hardcover was designed by the New York City graphic designer Chip Kidd and Barbara de Wilde. A 75,000 print order was made for the first edition (as opposed to the usual 10,000 order for a debut novel) and the book became a bestseller. It has been credited as originating the dark academia literary sub-genre, causing it to "explode like a firework" in the literary scene, according to The New York Times.

== Plot ==
Presumed to be set in the mid-1980s, the novel opens with Richard Papen leaving his hometown of Plano, California, to study literature at the elite Hampden College in Vermont. Richard finds he cannot enroll in the classes of the sole Classics and Greek professor, Julian Morrow, who limits enrollment to a wealthy, hand-picked coterie: orphaned twins Charles and Camilla Macaulay; closeted, aristocratic Francis Abernathy; mysterious prodigy Henry Winter; and brash loudmouth Edmund "Bunny" Corcoran. The group is devoted to Julian, who requires his students to primarily take classes with him and asserts sole control over their academic careers. After Richard assists them with a translation, they help him get accepted into Julian's classes.

Richard enjoys his new status as a member of the clique, isolating himself from the rest of the school and spending weekends at Francis's aunt's house in the country drinking heavily. He notices occasional odd behaviors from the others, but dismisses them as eccentricities. He develops a crush on Camilla, and observes Henry's apparent strained friendship with Bunny. Over the winter, Bunny and Henry go on a trip to Rome while the others return to their families, except for Richard, who is self-conscious of his working-class background and lodges in an unheated warehouse while taking a campus job. Unwilling to ask for help, he nearly dies from hypothermia and pneumonia one evening, and is rescued when Henry returns from Rome early and brings him to the hospital. Staying with Henry while he recuperates, Richard grows increasingly curious about his friends' erratic behavior, including rising tension between Bunny and the others.

When everyone except for Bunny seems to disappear without warning one day, Richard discovers that the group had secretly booked one-way plane tickets to Argentina, but they return without embarking on the trip. Realizing Richard has discovered this, Henry confesses the truth: the group, minus Richard and Bunny, held a Dionysian bacchanal in the woods near Francis's country estate in the fall, during which they killed a local farmer, although the details are left ambiguous. Bunny, who found out by chance, has been blackmailing the group ever since, with Francis and Henry giving him large amounts of money. Shortly after, a drunken and angry Bunny reveals his knowledge to Richard, and Richard tells the group that Bunny is no longer keeping the secret. Fearing that Bunny will expose them as his mental state deteriorates, Henry convinces the group to kill him. The five confront Bunny while hiking, and Henry pushes him into a ravine to his death.

After the murder, the group manages to maintain their cover, but each begins to crack under the strain: Francis's hypochondria worsens, Charles descends into alcoholism and abuses Camilla, and Richard becomes addicted to pills. As the friends begin to splinter apart, Richard learns that Francis has had sexual encounters with Charles, and witnesses Charles kissing Camilla in a suggestive manner, with Francis speculating a longtime sexual relationship between the twins. As Charles becomes increasingly possessive of Camilla, Henry arranges for her to move from the twins' shared apartment to a hotel, incensing Charles and causing Richard to grow jealous.

One day, Julian receives a previously undelivered letter purporting to be from Bunny, detailing the bacchanal murder and Bunny's fear that Henry is plotting to kill him. Though initially dismissing it as a hoax, Julian realizes the truth when he sees that it was written on stationery from Henry and Bunny's hotel in Rome. Though he does not alert anyone, Julian flees campus and never returns, much to Henry's grief and dismay. Charles' alcoholism and enmity towards Henry worsens as Henry begins living with Camilla. When Charles is arrested for drunk driving in Henry's car, Henry fears Charles will expose the group, while Charles fears that Henry may kill him to keep his silence. Drunk and desperate, Charles barges into Camilla and Henry's hotel room with a gun and tries to kill Henry, accidentally shooting Richard in the stomach. With bystanders approaching, Henry kisses Camilla before shooting and killing himself to preserve the group’s secret.

In the epilogue, following Henry's death, the group disintegrates. Charles descends further into alcoholism and runs away from rehab with a married woman; Camilla is left alone caring for her ailing grandmother; and Francis, whose wealthy grandfather discovers his sexuality, is forced to marry a woman he despises and attempts suicide. Richard graduates from Hampden as an academic with an unrequited love for Camilla, moving back to California, which he hates. In a dream, Richard meets Henry in a desolate futuristic museum, where Henry shows Richard slides of famous landmarks around the world. After a brief conversation, Henry leaves Richard to contemplate his unhappiness.

== Major characters ==
- Julian Morrow: an eccentric classics professor at Hampden who teaches only a small group of students whom he selects for their intellect, connections, and wealth. Julian was a prominent socialite in the 1940s, associated with T. S. Eliot and Ezra Pound. The independently wealthy Julian donates his salary to Hampden, with which he has a strained relationship. Julian extols the virtues of Greco-Roman society, and is viewed as a father figure by his students, who are taught nearly exclusively by him.
- John Richard Papen: a transfer student of modest means from California. He feels insecure about his background and so embellishes it to fit in with his fellow classics students. Richard reluctantly follows Henry's plans but does not put up serious resistance. Despite his portrayal of himself as an innocent bystander, it becomes increasingly evident throughout the story that Richard is deeply flawed and values appearances more than ethics, which is further heightened by his increasing infatuation for the members of Julian Morrow's clique.
- Charles and Camilla Macaulay: Charming, but aloof orphaned fraternal twins from Virginia. The complex relationship between the twins is characterized by jealousy and protectiveness. The twins frequently host the group for dinner. Camilla is a love interest of Richard, Henry and Charles.
- Henry Winter: a polyglot intellectual prodigy and published author with wealthy Nouveau riche parents and a passion for Homer and Plato. He is the unofficial leader of the group and is Julian's favorite student. Despite his intellectual talents, he is far removed from the modern world (exemplified by not knowing that the moon landing had occurred) and has a deeply entrenched entitlement, as shown by his "aesthetic objection" to taking the SAT. Furthermore, Henry did not graduate from high school due to injuries from an accident.
- Francis Abernathy: a generous, hypochondriac student from an old money background, whose secluded country home becomes a sanctuary for the group. Francis has an overprotective mother with a history of drug addiction who sent him to several elite European boarding schools. Francis later briefly appeared in Tartt's novel The Goldfinch.
- Edmund "Bunny" Corcoran: a jokester who, despite appearances of wealth, is in fact penniless and unabashedly takes advantage of his friends. Bunny's bigoted attitudes, such as anti-Catholicism and homophobia, antagonize other group members. Bunny is the least academically talented of the group; he has severe dyslexia and did not read until age 10. Unlike other group members, Bunny has a girlfriend and friends outside of the group. He is outwardly social and thought of by outsiders as funny and scholarly, but in reality is extremely egotistical, immature and impulsive.

== Themes ==
=== Classics ===
The Secret History partially draws its inspiration on the 5th-century BC Greek tragedy, The Bacchae, by Euripides. According to Michiko Kakutani, some aspects of the novel reflect Nietzsche's model of Apollonian and Dionysian expression in The Birth of Tragedy. Kakutani, writing for the New York Times, said "in The Secret History, Ms. Tartt manages to make...melodramatic and bizarre events (involving Dionysian rites and intimations of satanic power) seem entirely plausible." Because the author introduces the murder and those responsible at the outset, critic A. O. Scott labeled it "a murder mystery in reverse." In 2013, John Mullan wrote an essay for The Guardian titled "Ten Reasons Why We Love Donna Tartt's The Secret History", which includes "It starts with a murder," "It is in love with Ancient Greece," "It is full of quotations," and "It is obsessed with beauty."

The main characters' romantic and sometimes hedonistic lifestyles spiraling into moral ruin has prompted questions surrounding the portrayal of the Classics discipline. Sophie Mills describes Tartt's depiction of the Classics as nuanced: in a 2005 article, Mills said the Classics are portrayed as an "enemy of the ordinary: intriguing, stimulating, and individualistic, perhaps, but even more, exclusive, curiously cold, and impractical."

=== Beauty ===
Hailed for its stylistic qualities and atmospheric prose, "beauty is terror" is a recurrent idea throughout the text. Richard admits he has a "morbid longing for the picturesque at all costs", a reason he is drawn to the aesthetic appeal and mystique of the Classics students upon his arrival at Hampden and chooses to change his academic interest to the Classics. It is Julian's teachings of the Classics, ethics, and aesthetic philosophy that influence Henry, Camilla, Charles, and Francis to commit an act of Dionysian revelry, which ends with the murder of a farmer and their spiral into moral ruin. In terms of the text's form, Kakutani calls Tartt's prose "supple" and "decorous."

=== Elitism and indulgence ===
Often lying about his working-class past in order to fit in with his wealthier classmates, Richard conforms to the lavish lifestyles of his peers. Richard is the only student on scholarship in his social circle, which pressures him to conform with his classmates to the point of idealization. This is successful, considering his eventual mobility in the group as a trusted peer after Bunny's death. However, this closeness later leads him further along the path of what Kakutani calls "duplicity and sin."

== Reception ==
The book received generally positive reviews from critics. Michiko Kakutani called the novel "ferociously well-paced entertainment", which "succeeds magnificently" and heavily attributed the success of the book to Tartt's well-developed writing skills. Sophie McKenzie, writing for The Independent, called it "the book of a lifetime", stating that it was "perfectly paced" and the characters are "fascinating and powerfully drawn". However, James Wood of the London Review of Books gave it a mediocre review, writing: "The story compels, but it doesn't involve...It offers mysteries and polished revelations on every page, but its true secrets are too deep, too unintended to be menacing or profound." Critic Ted Gioia wrote:

There is much to admire in Tartt's novel, but it is especially laudable for how persuasively she chronicles the steps from studying classics to committing murder. This is a difficult transition to relate in a believable manner, and all the more difficult given Tartt's decision to tell the story from the perspective of one of the most genial of the conspirators. Her story could easily come across as implausible — or even risible — in its recreation of Dionysian rites on a Vermont college campus, and its attempt to convince us that a mild-mannered transfer student with a taste for ancient languages can evolve, through a series of almost random events, into a killer. Yet convince us she does, and the intimacy with which Tartt brings her readers into the psychological miasma of the unfolding plot is one of the most compelling features of The Secret History.

== Planned and cancelled screen adaptations ==
The novel has been optioned by several filmmakers in the decades since its release for a possible film or television adaptation; however, all have been unsuccessful.

Producer Alan J. Pakula first acquired film rights at the book's publishing in 1992 but put the project aside to work on The Pelican Brief and later The Devil's Own. He returned to The Secret History in autumn 1998, with Joan Didion and John Gregory Dunne hired to write the screenplay, and Scott Hicks to direct. However, Pakula's death in a November car accident caused the project to be abandoned.

The 2002 publication of Tartt's second novel The Little Friend caused a resurgence of interest in The Secret History. A new adaptation was announced by Miramax Films, to be produced by Harvey Weinstein and headed by Jake and Gwyneth Paltrow, who hoped to star as the characters Charles and Camilla Macaulay respectively. The unexpected death of the siblings' father Bruce Paltrow in October of that year caused the project to be shelved again, and the rights were reinstated to Tartt.

At the 2013 publication of Tartt's third novel The Goldfinch, interest in another adaptation was rekindled, this time for television with Tartt's school peers Melissa Rosenberg and Bret Easton Ellis at the helm (Ellis is the novel's co-dedicatee). This attempt also fell through after Rosenberg and Ellis failed to find financial backers interested in the project.

Tartt's unhappiness with the 2019 film version of The Goldfinch caused some to speculate she would not allow further screen adaptations of any of her novels, making a future project based on The Secret History in her lifetime unlikely. Tartt fired her longtime agent Amanda Urban over the film and stated, "Once the book is out there, it's not really mine anymore, and my own idea isn't any more valid than yours. And then I begin the long process of disengaging."

== Basis ==
Hampden College is based upon Bennington College, where Tartt was a student between 1982 and 1986. Between 2019 and 2021, journalist Lili Anolik interviewed old Bennington classmates of Tartt's and found that several characters are based quite vividly upon real people: the character of Julian upon Bennington Classics professor Claude Fredericks, Henry upon Todd O'Neal, Bunny upon Matt Jacobsen, and Judy Poovey upon Michelle Matland. According to O'Neal, the novel is "a work of thinly veiled reality—a roman à clef." According to O'Neal, "Claude considered it a betrayal—not a personal betrayal so much as a betrayal of his teachings. He wouldn't talk to Donna for years."

At Bennington during the 1980s, there were students playing at the aesthetic of Granada Television's 1981 TV adaptation of Evelyn Waugh's Brideshead Revisited, which the book also draws upon. Francis is inspired by both classmate Mark Shaw and Brideshead Revisited character Sebastian Flyte.

== Censorship ==
In August 2025, the Lukashenko regime of Belarus added the book alongside others to the "list of printed publications containing information messages and materials, the distribution of which could harm the national interests of Belarus" without any specific rationale for targeting the novel.
