= Fanny Peabody Mason =

American heiress, philanthropist (1864–1948)

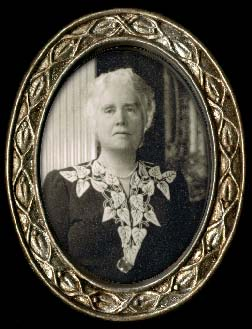
- Fanny Peabody Mason
- Born: November 18, 1864; Boston, Massachusetts, U.S.
- Died: August 29, 1948 (aged 83); Beverly, Massachusetts, U.S.
- Burial place: Mount Auburn Cemetery
- Other name: Fannie P. Mason
- Occupations: Heiress, philanthropist

Fanny Peabody Mason (November 18, 1864 – August 29, 1948) was an American heiress and philanthropist, who lived in Boston, Beverly, and Walpole, New Hampshire. She established a series of free public concerts in 1891 that became known as the Peabody Mason Concerts.

== Early life and family ==
Fanny Peabody Mason was born on November 18, 1864, Boston, Massachusetts. Her parents were Fanny (née Peabody; 1840–1895) and William Powell Mason Jr. (1835–1901), a lawyer and importer. Her only sibling, a brother, drowned while fishing in 1881 at Bakers Island in Massachusetts Bay.

Her paternal grandparents were Hannah (née Rogers) and William Powell Mason of Boston, and her maternal grandfather was George Peabody of Salem, Massachusetts. On her paternal side, she was a direct descendant of Jonathan Mason, a Massachusetts state senator, and John Rogers, an English Puritan minister and the 5th president of Harvard College.

Mason lived at her family home, the Mason House (1883) at 211 Commonwealth Avenue in Boston, designed by architectural firm Rotch & Tilden. The family also had a summer home from 1901 until 1913 (now known as the Stephen Rowe Bradley House), and owned the 1,000-acre (400 ha) Boggy Meadows Farm in Walpole, New Hampshire.

Mason is associated with French painter Alice Thévin (1862–1937), who lived with her seasonally at her Boston home from 1909 until her death in 1937.

== Late life, death, and philanthropy ==
Mason studied music in Boston and in Europe. She established a series of free public concerts in 1891 that became known as the Peabody Mason Concerts. The Fanny Peabody Mason Music Building (1914) was built at Harvard University, and now houses the John Knowles Paine Concert Hall on the second floor.

After Thévin's death in 1937, the Fanny P. Mason Fund in memory of Alice Thevin was started at the Museum of Fine Arts, Boston.

In her late life, Mason had an additional home in Beverly, Massachusetts. Mason died on August 29, 1948, in her home in Beverly, and was buried at Mount Auburn Cemetery in Cambridge, Massachusetts.

After her death in 1948, French pianist Paul Doguereau was left a trust to establish the Peabody–Mason Music Foundation. In 1981, the Peabody Mason International Piano Competition was founded by Doguereau.

She is the namesake of the Fanny Mason Forest in Walpole, New Hampshire.

== See also ==
- Statue of Samuel Eliot Morison (1982), located near her former home in Boston
