= Erin Parish =

American painter

Erin Parish (born 1966 in St. Louis, MO) is an American painter and independent curator.

== Early life and education ==
She graduated from Bennington College in 1988 with a B.A. and Queens College with an M.F.A. in 1990.

Parish is the daughter of four artists. As a child growing up, talk in her family focused on the New York Times and the changing commercial and philosophical views of the art world. She has been exhibiting regularly since the age of 18 and has been a practicing artist for nearly four decades.

== Career ==
While her early influences range from Joseph Cornell to the German Expressionists and the Neue Wilde artists of the 1980s, she now draws inspiration from the Hudson River School artists, as well as Mariko Mori, Yayoi Kusama and Japanese woodcuts by Hokusai and Hiroshige.

She is also influenced by the Japanese principles of Wabi-sabi and Yugen.

She has been represented by Winston Wachter Fine Art, New York, NY, since 2000.

== Residencies and grants ==
- 2001, Peter S. Reed Foundation Grant (New York City, NY)
- 1997, Fine Arts Work Center, Fellowship Grant from the Hand Hollow Foundation (Provincetown, MA)
- 1991, Vermont Studio Center, Critic's Grant (Johnson, VT)
