= Harrison Slater =

American writer, pianist, and educator

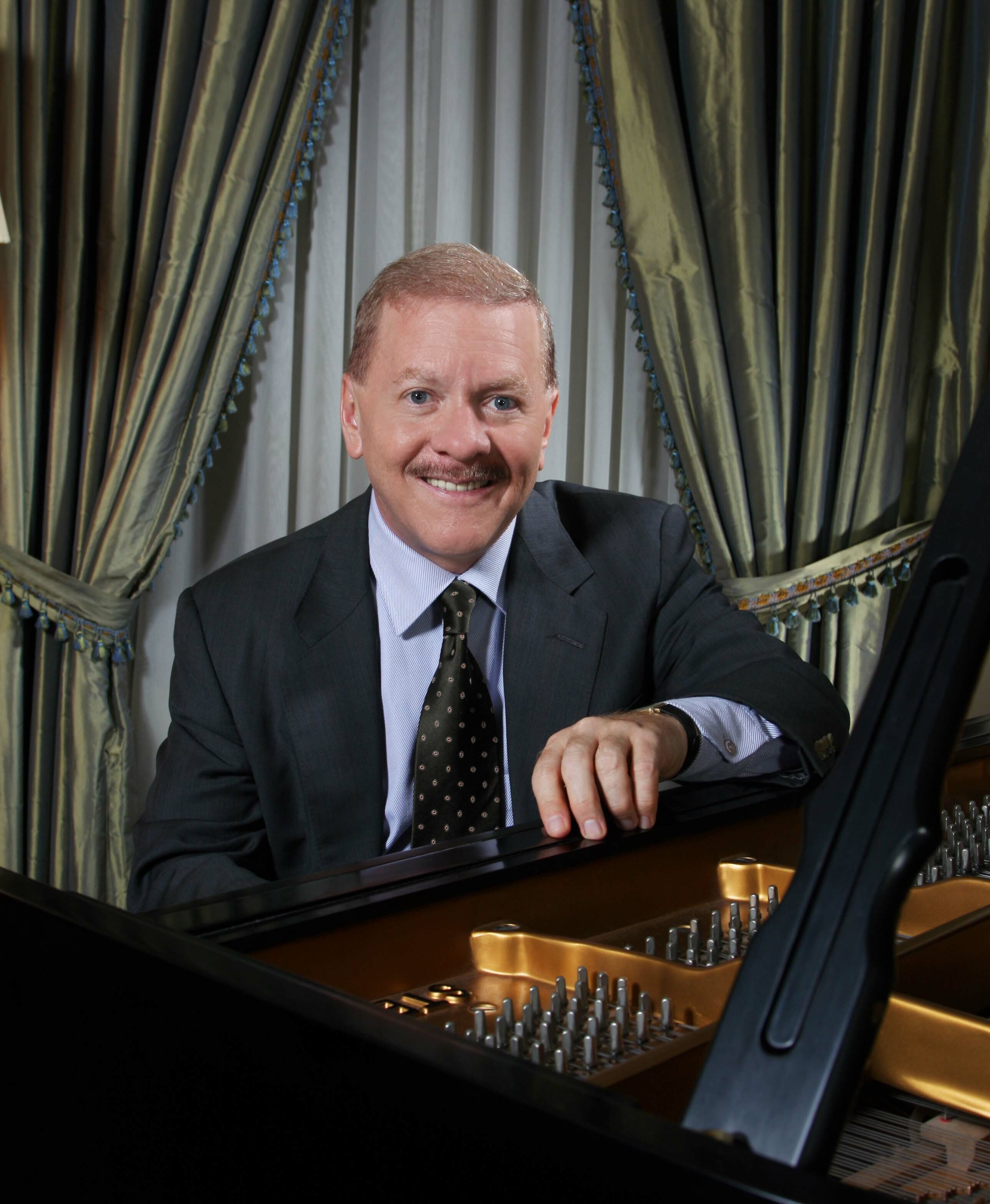
Harrison Slater

Harrison Gradwell Slater Wignall was an American writer, pianist, and educator. Born Harry James Wignall in New Bedford, Mass., he lived in New Bedford while his father, a US Army officer, was a prisoner of war for three years, held by the Communist Chinese in North Korea. In his youth Harry lived for four years in Mannheim and Frankfurt, Germany while his father was stationed with the US Army Northern Army Command. He graduated from Rancocas Valley Regional High School in Mt. Holly, NJ. He changed his name circa the publication of his first book to Harrison Gradwell Slater.

A pianist, he studied with Anthony di Bonaventura and for many years with Paul Doguereau, the noted French pianist who was a pupil of Ravel, Emma Bardac (second wife of Claude Debussy) and Paderewski. In addition to writing and recording, Slater coached many world-class pianists, and served as chairman and Artistic Director of the Peabody Mason International Piano Competition.

== Biography ==
Harrison Gradwell Slater Wignall combined the careers of musicologist, pianist and novelist. He has published three books on Mozart, the last of which is the mystery novel NightMusic, which deals with the life and music of Mozart. The sequel, Nocturne, explores Chopin's biography and music within a contemporary narrative.

For his first book, Slater (the author's pen name since 1995) traveled to fifty-five cities in nine European countries and completed his research over three years with correspondence to archives throughout Europe, always posing unresolved questions about Mozart Gedenkstaetten – the palaces, concert halls and salons in which Mozart performed, the houses and taverns in which he lodged, and the churches and public edifices that he visited. The resulting reference book, In Mozart's Footsteps, has been called "an amazing feat of scholarship" by the pianist, Alfred Brendel, while Nicholas Slonimsky described it as "absorbing in its brilliance".

NightMusic was voted "Rising Star of 2003" by nine publishing houses, was on the Barnes & Noble bestseller list for mystery trade paperback for nineteen weeks and was optioned for a film.

Scholarly articles by Slater (a.k.a. Harrison James Wignall) have appeared in the journals Mozart-Jahrbuch, Opera Quarterly and Mozart Studien, among others. Some of his recent discoveries include previously unknown Mozart documents and manuscripts that have shed light on issues of recent Mozart research. He has also written entries for the latest editions of The New Grove, Die Musik in Geschichte und Gegenwart, The New Grove Dictionary of Opera and has published articles in Perspectives of New Music, Indiana Theory Review, and the Nuova rivista musicale italiana.

Slater's discovery in 1993 of the vocal nocturne tradition, and its influence on Mozart and Chopin are found in his seminal work Mozart and the Duetto Notturno Tradition, and his entry "Duetto Notturno" in The New Grove. His present musicological work on the influence of the vocal nocturne on Chopin's piano music continues that research.

Slater accepted a full academic scholarship to Boston University, where he graduated first in his class, Bachelor magna cum laude, 1972, followed by a Master of Arts, Boston University, 1987 and a certified advisory study, Harvard University, 1987. In 1995, he was awarded a PhD in musicology from Brandeis University with a dissertation on Mozart's opera Mitridate.

Slater worked in various music capacities: a music theory instructor at Massasoit Community College, Brockton, Massachusetts, 1975–1980; music specialist, Munich (Germany) International School, 1980–1982, and International School of the Sacred Heart, Tokyo, 1984–1985; ballet pianist, National Theatre, Munich, 1982–1984; and as a ballet pianist at La Scala, Milan, 1985–1986. He performed numerous concerts during this period. He was a member of the American Musicological Society, Society Music Theory, Harvard Club, and Phi Beta Kappa.

Slater studied music and languages at Brandeis University, Boston University, LMU Munich, and Harvard University, and was fluent, in addition to English, German, French and Italian. He was active as a music instructor in Boston, Munich, Milan, and Tokyo and worked at the National Theatre Munich and La Scala in Milan as a ballet pianist, performing numerous concerts.

Slater finished recordings featuring the music of Mozart and Chopin, and has completed the sequel to NightMusic, entitled Nocturne (based on rediscovered diaries related to Chopin). His research and writing of the unpublished monograph, "Mozart in Milan" continues and includes, "Mozart and Sacred Music in the Ambrosian Capital" and "Mozart's Singers in Ascanio in Alba," articles which incorporate two handwritten diaries from 1771 found by Slater in archives in Milan.

He resided in an historic apartment in Back Bay, Boston, as well as in Milan, Paris and Mount Holly Township, New Jersey.

He died on April 6, 2017, in Mt. Holly, NJ at the age of 66.

== Works ==
=== Books ===
- Wignall, Harrison James, "In Mozart's Footsteps", New York: Paragon House, 1991. ISBN 1-55778-494-9
- Slater, Harrison Gradwell, "NightMusic", New York: Harcourt, 2002, hardcover. ISBN 0-15-100580-X
- Slater, Harrison Gradwell, "Night Music", Penguin Putnam, 2003, softcover. ISBN 0-451-20972-9
- Slater, Harrison Gradwell, "Nocturne", Editions Peabody Mason, 2010. ISBN 978-0-615-31304-7
- Slater, Harrison Gradwell, "Chopin and the Vocal Nocturne", Editions Peabody Mason, 2011. ISBN 978-0-615-46102-1

=== Articles ===
- "And Mozart Came In Search of Work", La Stampa, Year 130, No. 208, July 30, 1996
- "Mozart in Turin", Mozart Studien, 1997
- "Mozart and the 'Duetto Notturno' Tradition", Mozart-Jahrbuch, 1993
- "The Genesis of 'Se di Lauri'", Mozart Studien, 1994
- "Mozart's Imperial Opponent" (Italian and English), Nuova rivista musicale italiana, 1994
- "Mozart in Milan: Between Triumph and Disappointment", Mozartwoche und Salzburger Festpiele, 1997
- "Guglielmo d'Ettore: Mozart's First Mitridate", The Opera Quarterly, 1994
- "Rameau's Treatment of Suspensions", Indiana Theory Review, 1992
- "Current Trends in Italian Opera", Perspectives of New Music, 1991
- "Chickering's 'Old Ironsides'", Piano Quarterly, 1988
- "Behind Closed Doors", Keyboard Classics, 1987
- "The Development of Music in Boston, Part I: The Boston of Psalm-singers & Singing Schools", Massachusetts Music News, 1988
- "The Development of Music in Boston, Part II: Lowell Mason – A Sesquicentennial Perspective", Massachusetts Music News, 1988
- "The Development of Music in Boston, Part III: Pianos, Pedagogy & Performance", Massachusetts Music News, 1989
- "The Development of Music in Boston, Part IV: Chickering's Victory of the Ironclads", Massachusetts Music News, 1989
- "The Development of Music in Boston, Part V: A Taste for the Monumental", Massachusetts Music News, 1990

=== Recordings ===
- (2003) "NightMusic: Piano Music of Mozart", Newton Symphony Orchestra, Jeffrey Rink, Conductor
- (2010) "Nocturne: Piano Music of Chopin"
- (2012) “Concerto Paradiso” Chopin 2nd Concerto in Fm, Tchaikovsky Concerto No. 1 in Bb Minor. (Conductor) Slovak Sonfonietta,

== Sources ==
- As of this edit, this article uses content from "Biography", which is licensed in a way that permits reuse under the Creative Commons Attribution-ShareAlike 3.0 Unported License, but not under the GFDL. All relevant terms must be followed.
