= Fine Print (periodical) =

Periodical about book arts based in San Francisco, CA

- Editor and Publisher: Sandra Kirshenbaum
- Categories: Book Arts, Typography, Type Design
- Frequency: quarterly
- Founder: Sandra Kirshenbaum
- Founded: 1975
- Final issue: 1990
- Country: United States
- Based in: San Francisco
- Language: English
- ISSN: 0361-3801

Fine Print was an American highly respected periodical about book arts. It was founded in 1975 as an eight-page "Newsletter for the Arts of the Book" and in 1984 it had 3,000 subscribers.

From the "Complete Index": "Its initial purpose was to present bibliographic descriptions of finely printed books (i.e., letterpress) along with reports on allied arts like hand bookbinding, calligraphy, and papermaking." Eminent authors of articles in "Fine Print" included Joseph Blumenthal, Sumner Stone, Walter Tracy, Abe Lerner, and Paul Hayden Duensing.

The covers were remarkable. Writing in Parenthesis, Rabin D. Harlan says:

With the October 1979 issue, separate covers were introduced, each designed by a different person who might be a calligrapher, a printer, a type designer, or a practitioner of such other crafts. Adrian Wilson’s cover design inaugurated this series, which became the talk of the trade. Everyone has her or his own favorite cover design. The entire corpus will continue to be studied and admired by practitioners. students. and connoisseurs.

Other covers were designed by Hermann Zapf and others.

The periodical ceased publication with volume 16, number 4: "The Complete Index to Fine Print" (2003). The last regular issue was in 1990. The journal's papers are now with the Bancroft Library.
