= Jeremy Treglown =

British writer and historian (born 1946)

- Born: 24 May 1946 (age 80)
- Education: St Peter's College, Oxford; Hertford College, Oxford
- Occupations: Biographer, cultural historian and critic

Jeremy Treglown (born 24 May 1946) is a biographer, cultural historian, critic, and Emeritus Professor at the University of Warwick. He was editor of The Times Literary Supplement through the 1980s and chair of the Arvon Foundation, 2017–22.

== Biography ==
Educated at Bristol Grammar School and St Peter's and Hertford Colleges, Oxford, Treglown was a lecturer in English Literature at Lincoln College, Oxford 1973–76 and University College London 1976–79. In the 1970s, he wrote regularly for the New Statesman on fiction and for The Times and Plays and Players on theatre, and he has published since in many newspapers and magazines including The New Yorker and Granta. He joined The Times Literary Supplement in 1979 as arts editor, becoming editor from 1981 to 1990. After a semester as Ferris Professor of Journalism at Princeton, Treglown spent twenty years as a professor of English and Comparative Literary Studies at Warwick, where he began the Warwick Writing Programme with the poet David Morley.

His biography of Henry Green won the Dictionary of Literary Biography Award (2000) and V. S Pritchett: A Working Life was shortlisted for the 2004 Whitbread Award for biography and for the Duff Cooper Prize. Franco's Crypt: Spanish Culture and Memory since 1936 (2013), published in Spanish by Ariel in 2015, was described by Antonio Muñoz Molina as "A book that must be read, in Spain and abroad, by anyone who wants to understand the country" and by Stanley Payne in The Wall Street Journal as "the best, and most objective, brief introduction to Spain's memory wars to be found in any language." His most recent book is Mr Straight Arrow: the Career of John Hersey, author of 'Hiroshima' (New York: Farrar, Straus & Giroux, 2019). The American Scholar said of it: "This admirable book about an admirable man… belongs to that elegant, reticent, wholly non-sleazy, and sadly disappearing genre known as literary biography, and for anyone interested in how a writer’s life is really lived as opposed to its incidental moments of glamour, Jeremy Treglown’s account of Hersey’s career—its constraints and opportunities, the worries and satisfactions, and the nature of the actual work—is deeply satisfying."

Treglown also wrote the first full biography of Roald Dahl, and initiated and, with Deborah McVea, co-edited the online index of previously anonymous contributors to the TLS. A Fellow of the Royal Society of Literature, he has been a member of the Society's Council and has served as chair of the judges of the Booker Prize, the Whitbread Award and other book prizes. Among various research posts, he has been a Visiting Fellow of All Souls and Fellow of the New York Library's Cullman Center for Writers and Scholars, and of the Rockefeller Center, Bellagio.

He is currently researching the history of the Arvon Foundation.

In 1970, Treglown married Rona Bower (they met in an OUDS production of Romeo and Juliet in which she was Juliet, he Mercutio). They were divorced in 1982. In 1984, he married Holly Eley (née Urquhart), an assistant editor at the TLS, who died in 2010. In 2013, he married Maria Alvarez, a philosopher at King's College, London. He has a son, three daughters and eight grandchildren.

== Works ==
- Mr. Straight Arrow: The Career of John Hersey, Author of Hiroshima / Farrar, Straus and Giroux, 2019, ISBN 9780374280260
- Franco's Crypt: Spanish Culture and Memory Since 1936 / Farrar, Straus and Giroux, 2013, ISBN 9780374108427, Chatto and Windus, 2014, ISBN 9780701180621.
  - Spanish translation La cripta de Franco: Viaje por la memoria y la cultura del franquismo, Ariel, 2014, ISBN 9788434418622
- V. S. Pritchett: A Working Life, Chatto & Windus / Random House USA, 2004, ISBN 978-0-7126-9725-5
- Romancing: The Life and Work of Henry Green, Faber and Faber / Random House USA, 2000, ISBN 978-0-571-16898-9
- Roald Dahl: A Biography, Faber and Faber / Farrar Straus & Giroux, 1994, ISBN 978-0-571-16572-8

=== As editor ===
- Roald Dahl: Collected Stories / Everyman’s Library, 2006.
- Essential Stories by V. S. Pritchett / Modern Library Classics, 2005.
- (with Bridget Bennett) Grub Street and the Ivory Tower: Literary Journalism and Literary Scholarship from Fielding to the Internet / OUP, 1998.
- The Lantern-Bearers: Essays by Robert Louis Stevenson, Chatto & Windus / Farrar Straus & Giroux, 1988. (Reprinted by Cooper Square Press, NY, 1999.)
- Spirit of Wit: Reconsiderations of Rochester / Basil Blackwell, 1982.
- The Letters of John Wilmot, Earl of Rochester / Basil Blackwell / Chicago University Press, 1980.

== See also ==
- Literature
