= Ladies (song) =

Single by Sarai

from the album The Original
- Released: June 9, 2003
- Recorded: 2002
- Genre: Rap
- Length: 3:22 (Album version)
- Label: Epic; Sony; Sweat
- Songwriters: S. Howard; A. Theodore; V. Alfieri; M. Williams
- Producers: Ali Dee Theodore: Vinny Alfieri; Zach Danziger

Sarai singles chronology
"Pack Ya Bags" (2002)	"Ladies" (2003)

Music video
- "Ladies" on YouTube

"Ladies" is a song by American rapper Sarai for her debut album, The Original (2003). It peaked at number 1 on the US Billboard Bubbling Under Hot 100 in summer of 2003, 19 on the US Billboard Pop Airplay and 28 on the US Billboard Rhythmic chart.

== Music video ==
The music video for "Ladies" was filmed by director Karim Karmi and produced by Melissa Larsen.

== Track listing ==
CD single (2003)

1. "Ladies" (Radio Edit) – 3:22
2. "Ladies" (Album Version) – 3:22
3. "Ladies" (Instrumental) – 3:22
4. "Ladies" (Acappella) – 3:22
5. "Ladies" (Call Out Hook) – 0:15

== Charts ==
Chart performance for "Ladies"
Chart (2003)	Peak position
Australia (ARIA)	60
New Zealand (Recorded Music NZ)	33
US Billboard Bubbling Under Hot 100	1
US Billboard Pop Airplay	19
US Billboard Rhythmic	28
