= Kmiec =

Kmiec is a surname. Notable people with the surname include:

- Douglas Kmiec (born 1951), American legal scholar
- Edward Kmiec (1936–2020), American Roman Catholic bishop
- Staś Kmieć, American dancer
- Tom Kmiec (born 1981), Canadian politician
