= The Original (album) =

Studio album by Sarai
- Released: July 29, 2003
- Recorded: 2001–2003
- Genre: Rap/Hip Hop
- Length: 45:35
- Label: Epic
- Producer: Ali Dee Theodore, Scott Storch, Beau Dozier, LJ "Chocolate Starr" Sutton, Allegro, Sanchez

Professional ratings
Review scores
Source	Rating
Allmusic	3/5 stars

The Original is the only studio album from American rapper Sarai. Released in 2003 via Sweat/Epic Records. The first single released to radio was "Pack Ya Bags" in 2002. The official single "Ladies" was released in 2003. The album entered the Billboard 200 chart at No. 187.

== Track listing ==
1. "Intro" (0:28)

- Produced by Ali Dee Theodore & Vinny Alfieri for The Grand Skeem
- Co-Produced by Zach Danziger for The Grand Skeem

2. "I Know" (3:58)

- Produced by Scott Storch for Tuff Jew Productions

3. "Mind Ya Business" (3:44)

- Produced by Sanchez

4. "Ladies" (3:22)

- Produced by Ali Dee Theodore & Vinny Alfieri for The Grand Skeem
- Co-Produced by Zach Danziger for The Grand Skeem

5. "What Mama Told Me" (3:08)

- Produced by Ali Dee Theodore, Vinny Alfieri & Zach Danziger for The Grand Skeem

6. "It's Not A Fairytale" (4:03)

- Produced by Allegro for Head Bangers Music, Inc.

7. "Pack Ya Bags" (3:28)

- Produced by Allegro for Head Bangers Music, Inc.

8. "Swear" (featuring Beau Dozier) (3:48)

- Produced by Beau Dozier for Beautown Entertainment

9. "You Could Never" (3:09)

- Produced by Scott Storch for Tuff Jew Productions

10. "L.I.F.E." (featuring Jaguar) (4:58)

- Produced by Scott Storch for Tuff Jew Productions

11. "It's Official" (3:55)

- Produced by LJ "Chocolate Starr" Sutton & Brandon "B-Stylz" McKinney for Infra-Red Entertainment Inc.

12. "Mary Anne" (featuring Black Coffey) (5:14)

- Produced by LJ "Chocolate Starr" Sutton & Brandon "B-Stylz" McKinney for Infra-Red Entertainment Inc.

13. "Black & White" (4:20)

- Produced by Scott Storch for Tuff Jew Productions

== Sample credits ==
- "It's Not A Fairytale" contains a sample of Portishead's "Roads".

== Singles ==
- 2002: "Pack Ya Bags"
- 2003: "Ladies"

== Personnel ==
- Executive producers: David McPherson & Keith Sweat
- A&R Direction: David McPherson & Victor Cade
- Associate Producers: Infra-Red Entertainment, Inc. & Sweat Records, LLC
- Management: Keith Mitchell for One Point Five Management, Inc.
- A&R Managers: Verma Miles& Amanda Rosamilia
- A&R Coordinator: Elliot Range
- Art Direction: Chris Feldmann
- Photography: Rod Spice/Art Mix
- Photography Cover: Jeff Bender
- Styling: Liza Montoya
- Makeup: Jay Manuel
- Hair: Caprice Green
