= 21 Jump Street (soundtrack) =

21 Jump Street (Original Motion Picture Score)

Film score by Mark Mothersbaugh
- Released: September 23, 2014
- Recorded: 2012
- Studio: Sony Scoring Stage, Sony Pictures Studios, California
- Genre: Film score
- Length: 37:19
- Label: La-La Land; Madison Gate

Mark Mothersbaugh chronology
Alvin and the Chipmunks: Chipwrecked (2011)	21 Jump Street (2012)	Safe (2012)

21 Jump Street (Original Motion Picture Score) is the score album to the 2012 film 21 Jump Street directed by Phil Lord and Christopher Miller. The film's original score is composed by Mark Mothersbaugh and released through La-La Land Records on September 23, 2014 as a double disc album with the score of the film's sequel, 22 Jump Street.

== Background ==
Lord and Miller's frequent collaborator Mark Mothersbaugh composed the score in their second collaboration after Cloudy with a Chance of Meatballs (2009). Mothersbaugh was initially apprehensive of the original source material—the 1987–1991 television series—which he called it as "the lamest television show ever made". However, he agreed to do it owing to the duo's rapport. The soundtrack consisted mostly of electronic music.

A modernized cover of the original television show's theme was performed by Rye Rye and Esthero. It was released as a digital single on March 10, 2012 in the iTunes Store. Another cover of the theme performed by Wallpaper was also released on March 12. Mothersbaugh's score was not released along with the film. On September 23, 2014, La-La Land Records released a double disc album limited to 2,000 copies, which consists of the film's original score along with that of the sequel, 22 Jump Street. The standalone edition of the album was released by Madison Gate Records on November 4, 2014.

== Reception ==
Daniel Schweiger of AssignmentX wrote "the charm in these Jump Street scores is that he might as well be thrashing on top of an army tank as it's racing to save the world." The Hollywood Reporter described the score as "playful". Chris Cabin of Slant Magazine called it as "zippy". Peter Debruge of Variety wrote "Bringing composer Mark Mothersbaugh along for the high-energy assignment, the helmers make slick use of their new live-action collaborators."

== Track listing ==
21 Jump Street (Original Motion Picture Score) track listing
No.	Title	Length
1.	"Back Together"	1:53
2.	"Arrival at Police Academy"	0:53
3.	"Park Chase"	1:59
4.	"Jump Street Rules"	1:04
5.	"Korean Jesus"	1:07
6.	"Arrival at School"	2:50
7.	"Track Meet"	1:16
8.	"Party Prep and Fight"	2:14
9.	"Asking Molly to the Prom"	1:17
10.	"Running out of Time"	1:23
11.	"Fired"	1:15
12.	"Motorcycle Gang Shows Up"	1:30
13.	"Shoot Out"	3:48
14.	"Limo Chase"	3:17
15.	"Walters Holds Molly Hostage"	1:22
16.	"We Did It"	1:49
17.	"The Kiss"	1:28
18.	"21 Jump Street End Credits"	6:54
Total length:		37:19

== Personnel ==
Credits adapted from CD liner notes.

- Music composed and produced by – Mark Mothersbaugh
- Recording and mixing – Brad Haehnel
- Mixing assistance – John Aspinall
- Mastering – James Nelson
- Music editor – Andy Dorfman, Katie Greathouse
- Executive producer – Neal Moritz

Instruments

- Bass – Bruce Morgenthaler, Christian Kollgaard, David Parmeter, Nicolas Philippon, Oscar Hidalgo, Stephen Dress, Susan Ranney, Michael Valerio
- Cello – Antony Cooke, Armen Ksajikian, Cecilia Tsan, Christina Soule, Dane Little, Steve Erdody
- French horn – Brian O'Connor, Daniel Kelley, Danielle Ondarza, David Everson, David Duke, Dylan Hart, Jenny Kim, Mark Adams, Phillip Edward Yao, James Thatcher
- Keyboards – Albert Fox, John Enroth
- Percussion – Alan Estes, Donald Williams, Gregory Goodall, Peter Limonick, Stevej Schaeffer
- Trombone – William Reichenbach, George Thatcher, Steven Holtman
- Trumpet – David Washburn, Malcolm McNab
- Tuba – Doug Tornquist
- Viola – Denyse Buffum, Jennie Hansen, Keith Greene, Marlow Fisher, Matthew Funes, Michael Nowak, Robert Brophy, Roland Kato, Shawn Mann, Thomas Diener, Victoria Miskolczy, Brian Dembow
- Violin – Aimee Kreston, Alyssa Park, Amy Hershberger, Ana Landauer, Chang Qu, Clayton Haslop, Darius Campo, Dimitrie Leivici, Elizabeth Hedman, Endre Granat, Eun-Mee Ahn, Helen Nightengale, Henry Gronnier, Irina Voloshina, Jay Rosen, Jessica Guideri, Joel Pargman, Julie Ann Gigante, Katia Popov, Kevin Connolly, Lisa Sutton, Lorand Lokuszta, Lorenz Gamma, Maia Jasper, Marc Sazer, Maya Magub, Miwako Watanabe, Neil Samples, Nina Evtuhov, Phillip Levy, Radu Pieptea, Sara Parkins, Sarah Thornblade, Serena McKinney, Sid Page, Tereza Stanislav, Mark Robertson

Orchestra

- Orchestration – Richard Bronskill
- Orchestra conductor – James T. Sale
- Orchestra contractor – Peter Rotter
- Chorusmaster – Bruce Dukov
- Copyist – Joann Kane Music Service
- Music librarian – Mark Graham
