= Miss Eighty 6 =

American rapper

Sarai
- Also known as: Miss Eighty 6, Miss 86, 86
- Born: Sarai Marie Howard; January 23, 1981 (age 45)
- Origin: Kingston, New York, United States
- Genres: Hip-hop
- Occupations: Emcee, songwriter, actress
- Years active: 2001–present
- Labels: Epic, SME, DeeTown Entertainment

Sarai Marie Howard (born January 23, 1981) is an American rapper.

== Biography ==
=== 2001–2004: Music ===
Shortly after relocating to Atlanta, Sarai signed a record deal with Epic Records. She thus became the first white female rapper to be represented by a major U.S. label. In 2001, she was prominently featured on the single "Same Ol' Same Ol' (remix)" by label-mate P.Y.T., and appeared in the group's music video, as well as a second remix on their album. "It's Official," a track from her debut The Original, also appeared as a hidden snippet track on their debut album.

In 2002, Sarai's "Pack Ya Bags" was released to radio and as a single. It debuted on the R&B/Hip-Hop charts at #90. Soon after, her record label briefly dubbed her Feminem in an attempt to draw comparisons between her and fellow artist Eminem.

In 2003, "Ladies" was released as a single to radio stations, landing on Billboard's Pop Airplay chart at #28. It peaked at #19, and stayed on the chart for 11 weeks. A video of the song was also released.

Her song The Original was released on July 29, 2003. The album entered the Billboard 200 chart at #187. The album featured production from Ali Dee Theodore, Scott Storch, Beau Dozier, and many others. The album lacked promotion by Epic Records, causing it to go under the radar of many. A rumored follow-up single, "Black & White", was supposed to be released - but was cancelled after Sarai was released from her contract with Epic.

In 2004, Sarai began filming National Lampoon's Pledge This! starring Paris Hilton. Portraying a character named Tonya. The film was pushed back many times before releasing in 2006.

=== 2005 – present: Music ===
After leaving Epic, Sarai (now under the pseudonym Miss Eighty 6) joined Ali Dee Theodore and his company DeeTown Entertainment and has gone to write and perform music and soundtracks for movies and television, including Gossip Girl, Melrose Place, Kimora: Life in the Fab Lane, Bones, Supernatural, Numb3rs, Chuck, The Nine Lives of Chloe King, MTV's Cribs, Dismissed, Pimp My Ride, My Super Sweet 16, High School Stories and Date My Mom. Box office & straight to video films – Alvin and the Chipmunks, Fantastic Four, Harold and Kumar go to White Castle, In the Mix, Aquamarine, American Pie Presents: The Naked Mile & Beta House, spoof films Meet the Spartans, Disaster Movie, Vampires Suck, Tyler Perry's Why Did I Get Married Too?, For Colored Girls and most recently Little Fockers, Big Mommas: Like Father, Like Son and What's Your Number?’’Bad Girls Club’’

Sarai was featured on The Baldwin Brothers Return of the Golden Rhodes on the track, "A Matter Of Time" credited under her name. A video was also shot and released. The song was featured in Double Down, an episode of Numb3rs.

== Filmography ==
- National Lampoon's Pledge This! – Tonya
- Shocked Jock – Lisa

== Discography ==
=== Albums ===
- The Original (Epic, 2003)

=== Anthologies ===
- 2001 Epic Records: A Season of Soul and Sounds (Epic)
  - Here Comes Christmas
- 2008 DeeTown Presents: Music from Chick Shows (Vol. 1) (DeeTown Entertainment)
  - Candy Store, Inside Outside, Ring a Ling and Till the Sun Comes Up.
- 2009 DeeTown Presents: Music from Chick Shows (Vol. 2) (DeeTown Entertainment)
  - Bounce Back, Release, Ridin' and We Keeps It Real.

=== Singles ===
List of singles, with selected chart positions
Title	Year	Peak chart positions				Album
Title	Year	US R&B/Hip-Hop	US Rhyth.	AUS	NZ	Album
"Pack Ya Bags"	2002	90	—	—	—	The Original
"Ladies"	2003	—	28	60	33	The Original

=== As Miss Eighty 6 ===
- "Cold (DeeTown Remix)" (Crossfade featuring Miss Eighty 6)
- "A Matter of Time" (The Baldwin Brothers featuring Sarai aka Miss Eighty 6)
  - Featured in: Numb3rs
- "Now You Know"
  - Featured in: Fantastic Four
- "Candy Store"
  - Featured in: American Pie Presents: The Naked Mile, Beta House
- "Till The Sun Comes Up"
  - Featured in: Gossip Girl, Without a Trace
- "Inside Outside"
  - Featured in: Beta House
- "Ring-a-Ling"
  - Featured in: Supernatural, Gossip Girl, Spring Breakdown, Something Borrowed
- "Release"
  - Featured in: Gossip Girl
- "Drive Me Crazy"
  - Featured in: Aquamarine, For Colored Girls, Beta House
- "Rebound"
  - Featured in: Beta House
- "Horror Story"
  - Featured in: Gossip Girl, Something Borrowed
- "What They Talkin' Bout"
  - Featured in: Big Mommas: Like Father, Like Son
- "Turn It Around"
  - Featured in: Chuck
- "I Don't Care" (Sarai)
  - Featured on DJ Ron G - RnB Epic Records (2002)
- "Show Me How You Do It" *
  - Featured in: Disaster Movie
- "What's The Scenario?" *
  - Featured in: Disaster Movie
- "My First Wish"
  - Featured in: Vampires Suck, Something Borrowed, What's Your Number?, The Lying Game
- "What Is It"
  - Featured in: Army Wives
- "Goodie Bag"
  - Featured in: Fighting
- "Murder"
  - Featured in: Why Did I Get Married Too?
- "Ridin'" (Classic & 86)
  - Featured in: Harold & Kumar Go to White Castle, In the Mix
- "Bounce Back" (Early Earl and Miss Eighty 6)
  - Featured in: Marmaduke, Beta House, Meet the Spartans, The Possession
- "We Keeps It Real" (The Deekompressors Feat. Classic & Miss Eighty6)
  - Featured in: Fighting
- "Get Up" (The Deekompressors Feat Miss Eighty6)
  - Featured in: Spring Breakdown
- "My Girlz"
  - Featured in: Spring Breakdown
- "I Rock Hard"
  - Featured in: Aquamarine
- "Came To Party" (Sarai aka Miss Eighty 6 Feat. D-Major)
  - Featured in: Something Borrowed, Gossip Girl
- "Slomotion" (Chris Classic Feat. Miss Eighty 6)
  - Featured in: The Summer Classic 3 Mixtape
- "I Don't Really Care" (Miss Eighty 6 Feat. Rae)
  - Featured in: Private Practice
- "Get Spaztic" (Miss 86)
  - Featured in: Disaster Movie
- "Way U Love Me" (Miss 86)
  - Featured in: Disaster Movie
- "Starcruizer" *
  - Featured in: New Year's Eve

(*) denotes writing credit/non-performance
