= Paris Theodore =

American inventor

- Innovative Firearms Inventor and Manufacturer
- Born: January 9, 1943; New York City, New York
- Died: November 16, 2006 (aged 63); New York City, New York
- Spouse: Lee Theodore (m. 1962; died 1987)
- Children: 3, including Ali Dee Theodore
- Relatives: Nana Visitor (half-sister)

Paris Theodore (January 9, 1943 – November 16, 2006) was an American inventor of gun holsters, firearms and shooting techniques, which were used by government agencies and police departments in the U.S. and abroad, as well as by the fictional James Bond.

== Early years ==
Theodore was born in New York City on January 9, 1943. His father, John, was a sculptor and art professor at The Horace Mann School. His mother, Nenette Charisse, was a renowned ballet instructor and member of a Vaudeville dancing company. Charisse's second husband was Robert Tucker, a Tony-nominated choreographer, and the couple raised Theodore from early childhood. As a child, Theodore appeared as “Nibs” in the original 1954 Broadway theater production of, and NBC's 1955 and 1956 television broadcasts of, Peter Pan, starring Mary Martin. Due to the clandestine nature of his intelligence and firearm-related later work, the $15,000 he earned for his performance was “the last money he ever earned that the IRS was aware of”.

== Intelligence work ==
Theodore graduated from The Browning School on Manhattan's Upper East Side and continued his childhood work as a painter. According to his own accounts, Theodore supplemented his work as an abstract painter by serving as an independent contractor for the Central Intelligence Agency, having been recruited for such work, after graduation in the early 1960s. For several years, he supposedly performed a number of dangerous covert missions for the CIA. His obituary in The New York Sun states that “nothing can be verified” about his work, but that stories link him to “violent encounters” in Africa, Czechoslovakia, Greece and Vietnam. “I was working for Uncle Sam as a freedom fighter until Communism imploded on itself,” Theodore said.

== Entrepreneurship ==
Excerpt from Theodore's Seventrees holster catalogue 1969: the SCP holster

Theodore's experience, he said, sparked an interest in creating special holsters for the concealment of weapons. In 1966, at the age of 23, Theodore founded Seventrees Ltd., a company that designed and produced gun holsters for professionals who had the need to conceal weapons, yet access them quickly. Demand among undercover investigators and intelligence agents grew quickly for his innovative designs, and Seventrees was soon awarded several contracts from a variety of U.S. agencies. The growing popularity of the holsters inspired many imitations by other manufacturers: “Even the company's slogan “Unseen in the Best Places” was copied by at least one competitor.”

By day, Theodore and his team were manufacturing customized gun holsters, while by night, Seventrees’ West 39th Street offices were transformed into a clandestine weapons manufacturing operation, designing special classified concealment weapons for government agencies through a sister company, Armament Systems Procedures Corporation (ASP).

== Invention of the ASP ==
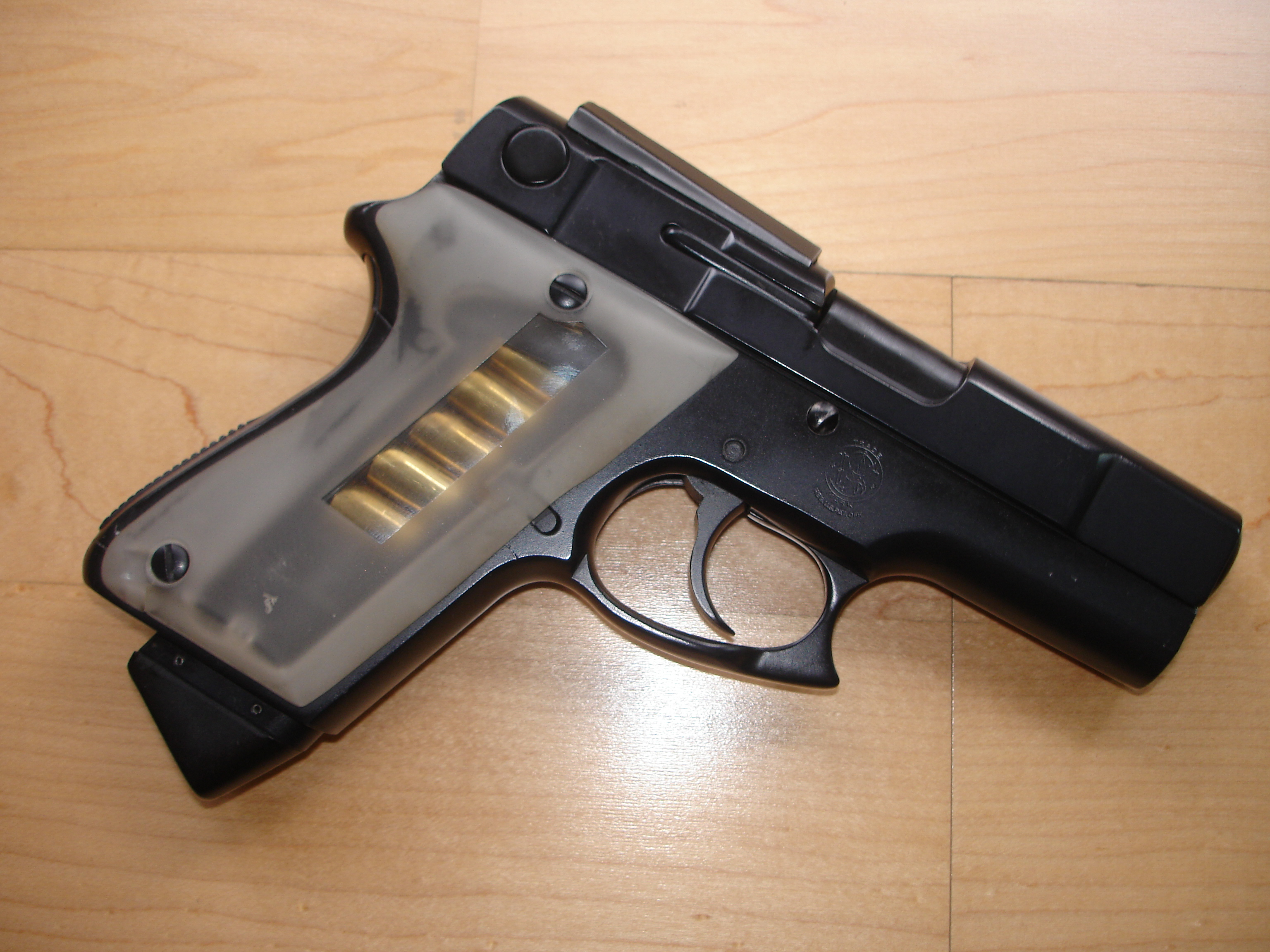
The ASP

One of ASP's first products was a Theodore-designed handgun bearing the name of the company. The ASP, based on the Smith & Wesson Model 39 semi-automatic pistol, featured many innovations: “clear grips” made of Lexan which enabled the user to see the number of unfired rounds remaining; the “Guttersnipe”, a gun sight designed for close-range combat; and a “forefinger grip”, today a standard feature on the trigger guard of many modern handguns.

Theodore's ASP was the first successful service caliber handgun in pocket pistol size. Its arrival inspired a cottage industry of gunsmiths producing unauthorized versions of the weapon, in addition to the authorized factory version from Theodore's ASP Inc.

In 1970, the ASP was featured in The Handgun, by Glaswegian gun expert Geoffrey Boothroyd. Boothroyd, the inspiration for “Q,” the technologically inventive character who outfitted James Bond with his lifesaving gadgets, would, in turn, later inspire Ian Fleming’s successor, John Gardner, to replace Bond’s renowned Walther PPK as 007’s weapon of choice. Beginning with 1984’s Role of Honor, the ASP would go on to be featured in 11 James Bond novels. James Bond expert James McMahon would later write: “If Bond were a gun, he'd be the ASP. Dark, deadly, perfectly suited to his mission.”

== Invention of the Quell system ==
In 1980, Theodore formed Techpak, a company created to market a combat handgun shooting technique he had developed called "Quell." The Quell system included a realistic depiction of close quarter combat, a shooting stance, as well as a targets designed to enhance the shooter's understanding of the Quell Zone, the area, that when struck, caused the instant cessation of movement by a hostile opponent. Quell drew upon Theodore's real-life experience in close-quarter combat and the concept of a "Quell stop" became standard training for many police departments and special agencies throughout the world.

Through Quell, Theodore sought to educate weapons professionals about the stark reality of close combat with handguns. Theodore was interviewed by the journalist Patrick Carr for his 1985 book Gun People, with photographer George W. Gardner. Theodore is presented therein as "a weapons designer formerly employed by the U.S. Government on classified and covert weapons projects". He is quoted as saying:

The truth of the matter is that no bullet from a sidearm, no matter what the caliber, will bowl a man over. The "stopping power" or striking force of the bullet can have no more impact than the recoil of the gun: otherwise the man pulling the trigger would be bowled over, because as every high school senior knows, every action is accompanied by a reaction of equal force in the opposite direction.

He added:

A member of the old NYPD Stakeout Unit once told us: "If they hit the ground with their legs crossed, they're dead. No further shooting of that felon is required. Go on to the next one."

In his Quell training he was an advocate of aiming at the spine, head and medulla oblongata of opponents to stop them.

== Personal life and death ==
In 1962, Theodore married Lee Becker, the Tony-nominated dancer and choreographer and founder of the dance preservation group The American Dance Machine. Lee died in 1987. Theodore lived and raised his family on Park Avenue.

Theodore died on November 16, 2006, at St. Luke's Hospital in Manhattan. The cause of death was complications resulting from a longstanding and debilitating bout with multiple sclerosis.

He is survived by his sons, Ali and Said Theodore, and Paris Kain. Kain, a filmmaker, was producing a documentary based on the life of his father at the time of the latter's death.
