= Undeniable (Chipmunks album) =

- CD cover

Studio album by The Chipmunks
- Released: November 4, 2008
- Recorded: 2008
- Genres: Pop, rock, hip hop, reggae, Christmas
- Length: 45:42
- Label: Chipmunk
- Producers: Ross Bagdasarian, Max Martin, Shellback

The Chipmunks chronology
Christmas with The Chipmunks (2008 reissue) (2008)	Undeniable (2008)	Alvin and the Chipmunks: The Squeakquel: Original Motion Picture Soundtrack (2009)

Undeniable is a second studio album by The Chipmunks. Its release was connected to the version of the Alvin and the Chipmunks franchise from Alvin and the Chipmunks, but contains no music from the film. It was released on November 4, 2008, as the follow-up to the Alvin and the Chipmunks: Original Motion Picture Soundtrack. and to commemorate the 50th anniversary of The Chipmunks as a franchise.

The album features remakes to some of their old hits as well as some new covers, such as the theme song to the 1980s television series of the same name.

== Track listing ==
1. "We're the Chipmunks" (DeeTown Remix)* (Janice Karman, Chris Caswell, Jason Honingford, Ali Dee Theodore)
2. "Shake Your Groove Thing" feat. Drew Seeley (Peaches & Herb) (Dino Fekaris, Freddie Perren)
3. "Livin' on a Prayer" (Bon Jovi) (Jon Bon Jovi, Richie Sambora, Desmond Child)
4. "Three Little Birds" (Bob Marley) (Bob Marley)
5. "Thank You"* (Ali Dee Theodore, Sarai Howard, Zach Danziger, Ross Bagdasarian Jr., Max Martin, Shellback)
6. "All the Small Things" (Blink-182) (Mark Hoppus, Tom DeLonge, Travis Barker)
7. "Acceptance"* (Ali Dee Theodore, Sarai Howard, Zach Danziger, Ross Bagdasarian Jr., Chris Classic)
8. "Don't Stop Believin'" (Journey) (Jonathan Cain, Steve Perry, Neal Schon)
9. "Ho Ho Ho"* (Janice Karman)
10. "Rock and Roll" (Led Zeppelin) (Jimmy Page, Robert Plant, John Paul Jones, John Bonham)
11. "Home" (Daughtry) (Chris Daughtry)
12. "Undeniable"* (Ali Dee Theodore, Sarai Howard, Zach Danziger, Ross Bagdasarian Jr.)
13. "We're the Chipmunks"* (Janice Karman, Chris Caswell)
14. "Time Warp" (The Rocky Horror Show) (Richard O'Brien, Richard Hartley)

* - denotes original Chipmunk song

== Personnel ==
- Vinny Alfieri - guitar, member of attributed artist
- Ali "Dee" Theodore - audio production, executive producer
- Justin Long - primary artist (as Alvin Seville)
- Matthew Gray Gubler - primary artist (as Simon Seville)
- Jesse McCartney - primary artist (as Theodore Seville)
- Ross Bagdasarian Jr. - audio production, cover design, dialogue, executive producer, producer
- Chris Classic - primary artist (as DJ)
- Alana Da Fonseca - composer, engineer, member of attributed artist, mixing, recorder, vocals (background)
- Zach Danziger - drums, member of attributed artist
- Christopher Davis - member of attributed artist, rap
- Dee Town - audio production, member of attributed artist, vocals
- Dino Fekaris - composer
- Chris Gehringer - mastering
- Jason Gleed - guitar, bass, keyboards, member of attributed artist
- Mark Hoppus - composer
- Rebecca Jones - member of attributed artist, primary artist, vocals (background)
- Janice Karman - audio production, dialogue, executive producer, producer
- Joey Katsaros - bass, keyboards, member of attributed artist
- Dan "D Unit" Levine - package design
- Bob Marley - composer
- John McCurry - guitar, bass, member of attributed artist
- Port O'Brien - composer
- Richie Sambora - composer
- Drew Seeley - guest artist, primary artist
- John VanNest - engineer, recorder
- Dave Wallace - drum, guitar, bass

== Chart performance ==
Undeniable peaked at No. 78 on the Billboard 200 albums chart.
