= Staś Kmieć =

American dancer

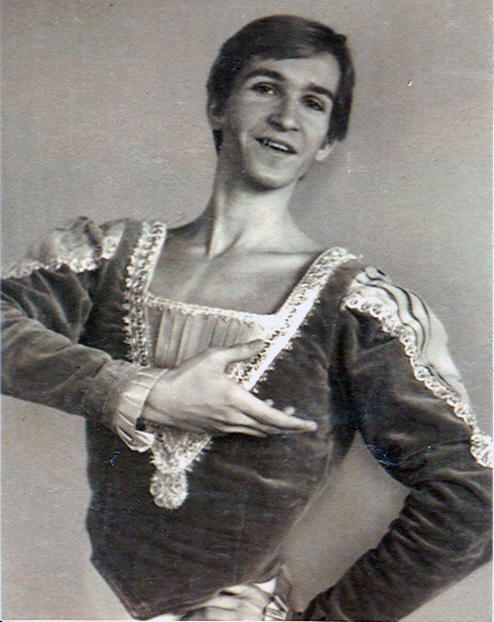
Staś Kmieć at the Boston Ballet in 1985

Staś Kmieć (/ˈstɑːʃ kəˈmjɛtʃ/ STAHSH kə-MYETCH, Polish: [staɕ ˈkmjɛt͡ɕ]) is an American theater and dance choreographer, specializing in a variety of styles of dance: theatre dance, character/folk, period/historical, social/ballroom, ballet, and concert dance.

American-born of Polish descent, he is considered the foremost U.S. authority on Polish folk dance and culture, having been published in numerous articles and in Polish Folk Dances and Songs – A Step-by-Step Guide (Hippocrene Books) - considered the encyclopedia of Polish dance in the English language. Kmieć is the PBS resident Polish Culture expert and has offered commentary on several programs nationwide and on New York, New Jersey and Pennsylvania affiliate stations.

As a dancer and choreographer, he has worked in many forms of dance - from classical ballet to folk, and from tap dance to musical theater. Born in Haverhill, Massachusetts

== Early life ==
Born in Massachusetts, Staś Kmieć began dancing at an early age. He graduated from Tufts University, and joined the ranks of the Boston Ballet to internationally tour with Rudolf Nureyev in the star's production of Don Quixote.

Moving to New York City, he was a featured performer with Lee Theodore’s American Dancemachine, danced with the Metropolitan Opera Ballet, performed regionally in musicals and completed two 2-year national tours of Jerome Robbins’ Fiddler on the Roof.

He alternates a performance career with engagements as a director-choreographer, and established two dance companies.

== Choreography ==
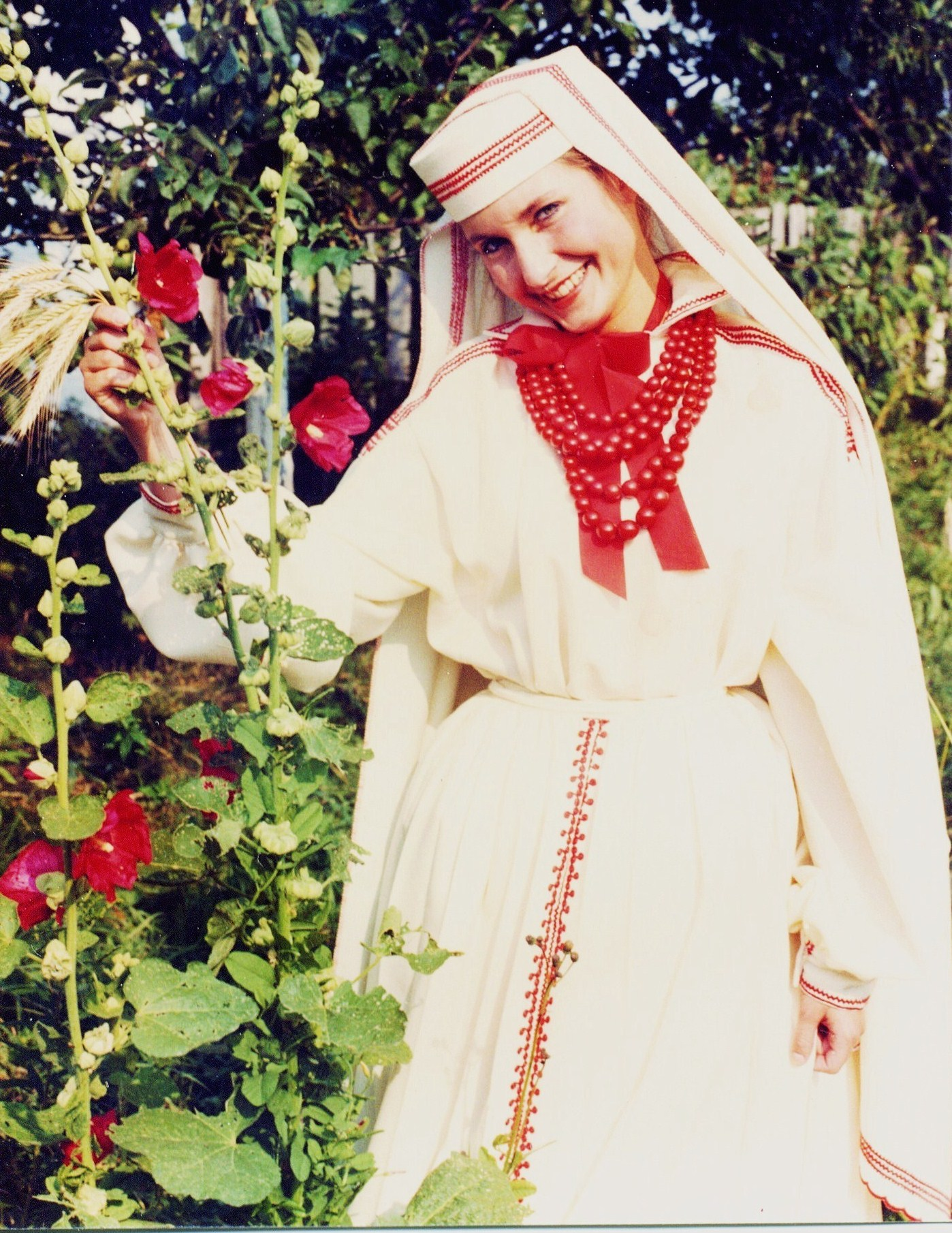
Through his ensemble, Lubliniacy in 1985, Staś Kmieć was the first to present the costumes, songs and dances of the obscure sub-region of Biłgoraj to audiences outside of Poland

As a choreographer, Kmieć specializes in a variety of styles of dance. Choreographic work appeared on the Off-Broadway stage at La Mama and New World Stages, the national tour of Me and My Girl, the Irish premiere of The Best Little Whorehouse in Texas, and concert work. On film, he created the dance moves for Billy Crudup in “Trust the Man," and the wedding sequence choreography in "The Comedian."

Staś has also choreographed plays including Thieve’s Carnival, Summit Conference, Jest, You Can’t Take It With You, and Dead Souls with Hank Azaria and Oliver Platt, The Defense of Prague, and Scott Schwartz’s My Antonia, a play with music by Stephen Schwartz.

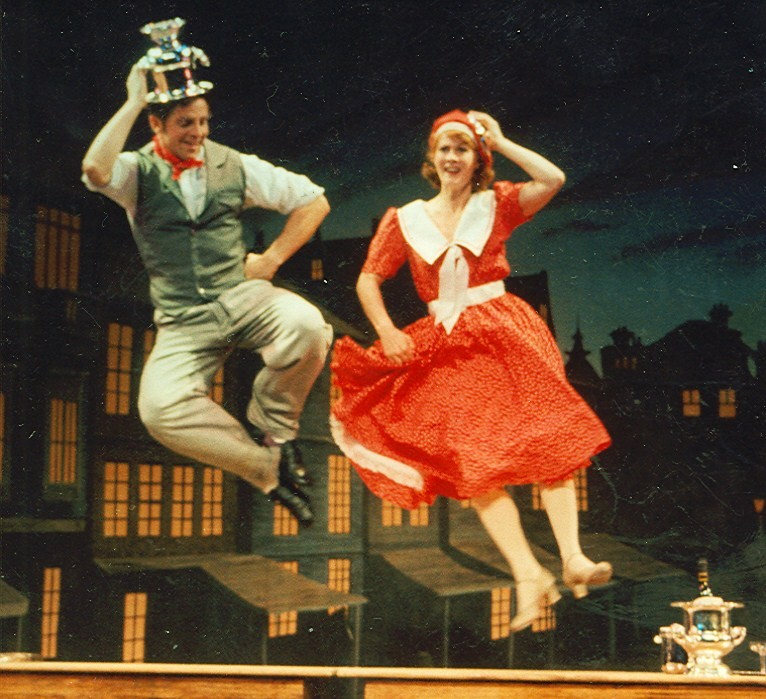
The musical - Me and My Girl, choreography by Staś Kmieć

My Antonia – “a play with music,” premiered in Los Angeles at the Rubicon Theater and Pacific Resident Theaters in 2008. The music was written by Broadway great, Stephen Schwartz.

He is the founding Artistic Director/Choreographer of the Sarabande Repertory Dance Ensemble and The Lublin Polish Song and Dance Ensemble, which has performed internationally.

As an instructor he focuses on the Broadway styles of Jack Cole, Jerome Robbins, Bob Fosse, and other Golden Age choreographers.

Kmieć resides in Manhattan. He has been a guest instructor at the American Musical and Dramatic Academy (AMDA), Boston Conservatory of Music, Tufts University, Hofstra University, Hunter College, and Youngstown State University, and was on the faculty at the prestigious Ballet Arts in Manhattan’s City Center. He was the director of New York City Ballet Education Department's program - NYCB Workout.

Kmieć was selected by a panel of Broadway choreographers, directors, and composers for DanceBreak 2007. This led director Scott Schwartz to engage him in as part of the creative team for his play adaptation of My Antonia – “a play with music,” which performed at the Los Angeles theaters: Rubicon Theater and Pacific Resident Theaters in 2008. The music was written by Stephen Schwartz.

In 2011, he assumed the position as Artistic Director of Ballet Western Reserve in Youngstown, OH and returned 2014-16. Among the new work created was "A Youngstown Nutcracker," which was set in the city's locale after The Civil War and incorporated historical figures and portrayed the focal Stahlbaum family as interfaith - Christian and Jewish.

In 2014, Kmieć received the “Excellence in Choreography” Award at the New York Musical Theater Festival for his work in the new musical The Mapmaker’s Opera.

== Performance history ==
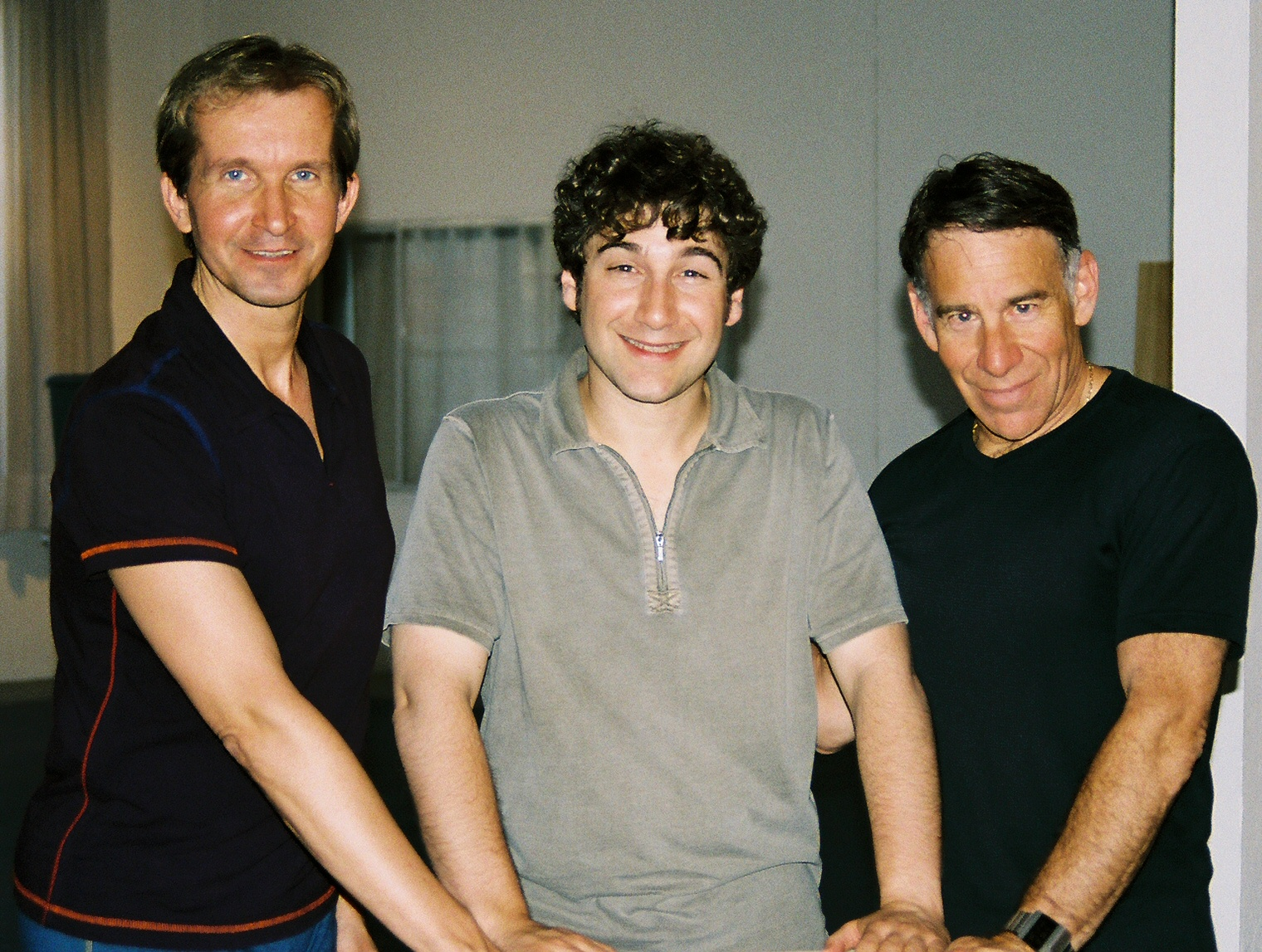
The creative team of My Ántonia: Staś Kmieć (choreographer), Scott Schwartz (play author and director), Stephen Schwartz (composer)

Staś Kmieć has danced with the Boston Ballet and the Metropolitan Opera Ballet; toured and performed on Broadway with both Rudolf Nureyev in Don Quixote, and in Lee Theodore's American Dance Machine.

He was a lead dancer in two national tours of Fiddler on the Roof with Theodore Bikel and subsequent productions with Bikel, Paul Sorvino and Spiro Malas - totaling 1,682 performances; has danced on film in Mona Lisa Smile and The Thing About My Folks, and appeared in acting roles on television and film including: Robert Redford’s Quiz Show, Woody Allen’s Don't Drink the Water, and Todd Haynes’ coming-of-age film Dottie Gets Spanked, featured at the Sundance Film Festival and on the PBS series, “TV Families.”

== Education ==
Kmieć graduated from Tufts University and the Maria Curie-Skłodowska University Studium Folklorzystczne in Lublin, Poland - graduating with distinguished honors (z wyróżnieniem).

== Polish culture and dance ==
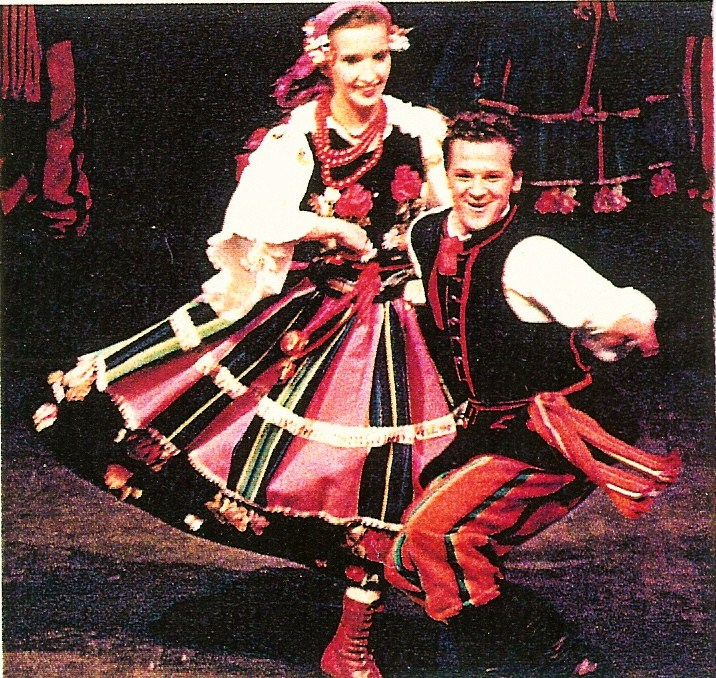
The Oberek from Łowicz, choreography by Staś Kmieć

Staś Kmieć is one of the authors of the definitive encyclopedia on Polish Dance in the English language, Polish Folk Dances and Songs (Hippocrene Books, 1997), and has appeared on television as PBS's resident Polish culture expert. He has been the culture editor for the now defunct Polish American Magazine, and since 1987 is the culture editor of The Polish American Journal. He is an Arts columnist for The Post Eagle.

It was his choreographic work and field research in Communist Poland, which has led to stage productions of Polish culture and dance. He specializes in the folk culture of southeastern Poland’s Lublin region, and the folklore of its Jewish Shtetl villages.

In 1989, Kmieć was honored by the Ministry of Culture with Poland’s culture honor – The Oskar Kolberg Award for his propagation and promotion of Polish culture abroad.

In 1977, when in his teens, he founded The Lublin Polish Song and Dance Ensemble (Zespół Pieśni i Tańca – LUBLINIACY). This was the first ensemble outside of Poland to present the songs and dances of the obscure Lublin sub-regions of Chełm (1982) and Biłgoraj (1985) and Powiśle (1986). He brought his company to Poland to tour in 1986. The Polish press remarked that “This is the only Polonia ensemble that evokes true Polish style and character in their performance presentation.”

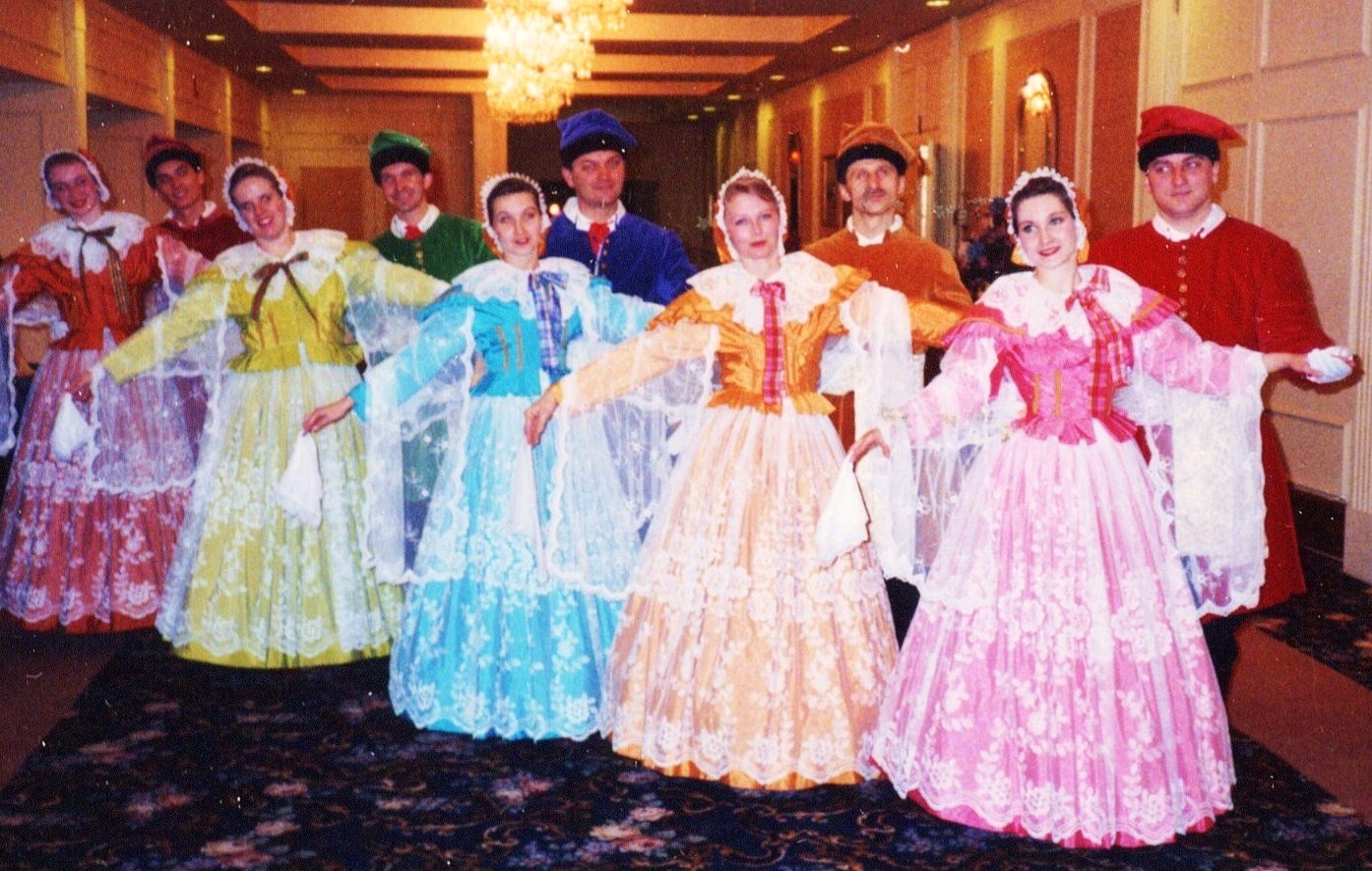
The Żywiec Burgher’s Polonez from southwestern Poland - The Lublin Polish Song and Dance Ensemble, choreography by Staś Kmieć

Incorporating over 250 performers (dancers, singers, and orchestra) in an outdoor extravaganza, Staś was the director of the 1995 and 1999 Dożynki Harvest Festival held in Orange County, NY.

Kmieć has created work for other Polish American groups including: The Alliance College Kujawiaki, Chicago’s Lira Ensemble, P.K.M. Polish Folk Dancers (Philadelphia), Syrena Folk Dance Ensemble (Milwaukee), and the Mandala Folk Dance Ensemble of Cambridge, MA. He was also instrumental in the pre-production work of Lira’s Zapraszamy tour project.

Kmieć is the American cultural representative for Poland’s Mazowsze (folk group) Polish Song and Dance Company, having appeared on PBS as the "PBS' resident expert and cultural ambassador".

== Affiliations ==
Kmieć is a member of Actors' Equity Association (AEA), Screen Actors’ Guild (SAG), the American Guild of Musical Artists (AGMA) and the Society of Stage Directors and Choreographers (SDC).

He was elected to the National Council of Actors' Equity, has served on the AGMA Board of Governors, and a voter for the Tony Awards.

PBS resident expert, Staś Kmieć gives a Lecture Symposium - Poland’s Living Folk Culture prior to a performance of the Mazowsze Polish Song and Dance Company

== Published works ==
=== Journal articles on Polish culture ===
- Kmiec, Stas (1997). "Szopka, A Fairy Tale Stable". Polish American Journal. ISSN 1946-4487.
- Kmiec, Stas (1999). "The Mystery Behind the Polish American Polka Costume". Polish American Journal. ISSN 1946-4487.
- Kmiec, Stas (May 2005). "The Pilgrim Pope from Poland - The Legacy of Karol Wojtyla - His Holiness Pope John Paul II". Polish American Journal. ISSN 1946-4487.
- Kmiec, Stas (December 2006). "Polish Christmas Ornaments - Traditional and Custom Creations of the Old World Christmas Tree". Polish American Journal. ISSN 1946-4487.
- Kmiec, Stas (2008). "Rituals of Midsummer's Eve". Polish American Journal. ISSN 1946-4487.
- Kmiec, Stas (2009). "Traditions of a Polish Easter". Polish American Journal. ISSN 1946-4487.

=== Books ===
- Dziewanowska, Ada (1997). Polish Folk Dances and Songs: A Step-by-Step Guide. Kmiec, Stas (contributing author). New York: Hippocrene Books. ISBN 9780781804202. OCLC 37180983.
- Galazka, Jacek; Juszczak, Albert (1992). Polish Heritage Travel Guide to U.S.A. & Canada. Kmiec, Stas (contributing author). Cornwall Bridge, CT: Polish Heritage Publications. ISBN 9780781800358. OCLC 27119190.
