= Alvin and the Chipmunks: The Squeakquel (soundtrack) =

Alvin and the Chipmunks: The Squeakquel (Original Motion Picture Soundtrack)

Soundtrack album by The Chipmunks and The Chipettes
- Released: December 1, 2009
- Genres: Pop; rock; hip hop; dance
- Length: 50:15
- Labels: Rhino; Fox Music
- Producers: Max Martin; Shellback; Ali Dee Theodore

The Chipmunks chronology
Undeniable (2008)	Alvin and the Chipmunks: The Squeakquel (Original Motion Picture Soundtrack) (2009)	Alvin and the Chipmunks: Chipwrecked (Music from the Motion Picture) (2011)

Alvin and the Chipmunks: The Squeakquel (Original Motion Picture Soundtrack) is the soundtrack for the 2009 film Alvin and the Chipmunks: The Squeakquel. Released on December 1, 2009, the album features performances by the Chipmunks and Chipettes, along with contributions from artists such as Honor Society, Queensberry, and Charice. The soundtrack achieved commercial success, selling approximately 650,000 copies and earning Gold certification from both the Recording Industry Association of America and the Australian Recording Industry Association.

== Background ==
For Alvin and the Chipmunks: The Squeakquel, producers recorded over 100 songs performed by the Chipmunks and Chipettes, though only a portion were included in the final film. Unlike the soundtrack of the original film, which featured original compositions, the Squeakquel soundtrack consists primarily of covers of popular songs by artists such as the Bee Gees and Alicia Keys. According to Mike Knobloch, Executive Vice President of Fox Music, the original film’s soundtrack faced difficulties in securing high-profile artists, with many declining to participate. As the original soundtrack achieved Platinum certification by the Recording Industry Association of America, it allowed for the inclusion of more popular music in the Squeakquel soundtrack.

== Reception ==
In December 2009, the album entered the Billboard 200 chart at number 28. During its first two weeks, it sold 77,000 copies, significantly outperforming the predecessor's soundtrack, which sold 7,000 copies during the same period. By the first week of January 2010, the album's sales showed an upward trend, reaching number 7 on the chart for the week of January 16, 2010, with 51,000 units sold. It reached its highest position at number 6 for the week of January 23, 2010, selling an additional 44,000 copies. Since its release, the album has sold nearly 650,000 units.

== Track listing ==
Standard track listing
No.	Title	Writer(s)	Performing artist(s)	Length
1.	"You Really Got Me"	Ray Davies	The Chipmunks featuring Honor Society	3:05
2.	"Hot 'n' Cold"	Katy Perry, Lukasz Gottwald, Max Martin	The Chipettes	4:05
3.	"So What"	Alecia B. Moore, Johann Karl Schuster, Max Martin	The Chipettes	4:05
4.	"You Spin Me Round (Like a Record)"	Pete Burns, Steve Coy, Wayne Hussey Mike Percy, Timothy Lever	The Chipmunks	3:13
5.	"Single Ladies (Put a Ring on It)"	Beyoncé Knowles, Terius Nash, Thaddis Harrell, Christopher Stewart	The Chipettes	2:57
6.	"Bring It On"	Ali Dee Theodore, Jason Gleed	The Chipmunks	3:46
7.	"Stayin' Alive"	Barry Gibb, Robin Gibb, Maurice Gibb	The Chipmunks	3:05
8.	"The Song"	Ali Dee Theodore, Alana Da Fonseca, Mike Klein, John McCurry	The Chipettes featuring Queensberry	3:06
9.	"It's OK"	Ali Dee Theodore, Alana Da Fonseca, Vinny Alfieri	The Chipmunks	2:48
10.	"Shake Your Groove Thing"	Dino Fekaris, Frederick Perren	The Chipmunks and The Chipettes	3:52
11.	"Put Your Records On"	Corinne Bailey Rae, John Beck, Steven Chrisanthou	The Chipettes	3:35
12.	"I Want to Know What Love Is"	Mick Jones	The Chipmunks	2:54
13.	"We Are Family"	Bernard Edwards, Nile Rodgers	The Chipmunks and The Chipettes	3:03
14.	"No One"	Alicia Keys, Kerry Brothers, Jr., George Michael Harry	The Chipettes featuring Charice	4:00

Bonus track
No.	Title	Writer(s)	Performing artist(s)	Length
15.	"I Gotta Feeling"	The Black Eyed Peas, David Guetta, Frédéric Riesterer	The Chipmunks and The Chipettes	4:06

Amazon.com bonus track
No.	Title	Writer(s)	Performing artist(s)	Length
16.	"In the Family"	Ali Dee Theodore, Jason Gleed, Alana Da Fonseca	The Chipmunks and The Chipettes	3:01

iTunes deluxe edition bonus tracks
No.	Title	Writer(s)	Performing artist(s)	Length
16.	"Daydream Believer"	John Stewart	The Chipmunks	2:45
17.	"Get Ur Good Time On"	Ali Dee Theodore, Alana Da Fonseca, Vincent Alfieri, John McCurry	The Chipmunks	2:48
18.	"The Song"	Theodore, Fonseca, Mike Klein, McCurry	Queensberry	3:06

== Charts ==
=== Weekly charts ===
Weekly chart performance for Alvin and the Chipmunks: The Squeakquel (Original Motion Picture Soundtrack)
Chart (2009–2010)	Peak position
Australian Albums (ARIA)	15
Austrian Albums (Ö3 Austria)	75
Belgian Albums (Ultratop Flanders)	20
Mexican Albums (Top 100 Mexico)	82
New Zealand Albums (RMNZ)	3
Scottish Albums (Official Charts)	4
Swedish Albums (Sverigetopplistan)	34
UK Albums (Official Charts)	6
UK Album Downloads (OCC)	15
UK Physical Albums (OCC)	4
UK Soundtrack Albums (Official Charts)	1
US Billboard 200	6
US Digital Albums (Billboard)	3
US Soundtrack Albums (Billboard)	1

=== Year-end charts ===
Year-end chart performance for Alvin and the Chipmunks: The Squeakquel (Original Motion Picture Soundtrack)
Chart (2010)	Position
Australian Albums (ARIA)	80
New Zealand Albums (RMNZ)	21
UK Albums (OCC)	79
US Billboard 200	35
US Soundtrack Albums (Billboard)	5

== Certifications ==
Certifications for Alvin and the Chipmunks: The Squeakquel (Original Motion Picture Soundtrack)
Region	Certification	Certified units/sales
Australia (ARIA)	Gold	35,000^{^}
New Zealand (RMNZ)	Platinum	15,000^{^}
United Kingdom (BPI)	Gold	100,000^{*}
United States (RIAA)	Gold	500,000^{^}
^{*} Sales figures based on certification alone.^{^} Shipments figures based on certification alone.
