= Aquamarine (film) =

2006 film by Elizabeth Allen

- Theatrical release poster
- Directed by: Elizabeth Allen
- Screenplay by: John Quaintance; Jessica Bendinger
- Based on: Aquamarine by Alice Hoffman
- Produced by: Susan Cartsonis
- Starring: Emma Roberts; Joanna "JoJo" Levesque; Sara Paxton
- Cinematography: Brian Breheny
- Edited by: Jane Moran
- Music by: David Hirschfelder
- Production company: Storefront Pictures
- Distributed by: 20th Century Fox
- Release dates: February 26, 2006 (Los Angeles); March 3, 2006 (United States)
- Running time: 104 minutes
- Country: United States
- Language: English
- Budget: $12 million
- Box office: $23 million

Aquamarine is a 2006 American teen fantasy romantic comedy film directed by Elizabeth Allen (in her feature film directorial debut), loosely based on the 2001 young adult novel of the same name by Alice Hoffman.

It stars Emma Roberts, Joanna "JoJo" Levesque in her film debut, and Sara Paxton as the eponymous character. The film was released in the United States on March 3, 2006, by 20th Century Fox.

Since its release, Aquamarine has become a cult film, particularly among Generation Z. In June 2026, a sequel series pilot was ordered by Disney with Roberts to reprise her role as a guest star and executive produce.

== Plot ==
Best friends Claire Brown and Hailey Rogers are enjoying their last few days of summer vacation in their small beach town of Baybridge near Tampa, Florida, before Hailey has to move to Australia due to her mother's job as a marine biologist. Hailey prays to the ocean gods for a miracle to change her mother's mind about moving; minutes later, a violent storm occurs.

The next morning, Claire accidentally falls into the local pool, which has been flooded with seawater from the storm. Believing to have seen something moving in the water, the girls sneak back into the pool that night, where they discover a mermaid named Aquamarine, who had been washed in by the storm. Aquamarine explains that she ran away from home after being forced into an arranged marriage between her and a merman by her father, as the mermaids do not believe in true love. However, he has agreed to end the engagement if she is able to prove to him within three days that true love does exist.

Aquamarine explains that she is able to transform her mermaid tail into human legs during the day, but will revert into a mermaid if she touches water, as well as when the sun sets. Her eye is eventually caught by Raymond, a lifeguard Hailey and Claire have had a crush on for years. They are reluctant to help her get him to notice her, but agree after Aquamarine reveals anyone who helps a mermaid is granted a wish, hoping to use the wish to prevent Hailey's impending move.

Not understanding human social cues, Aquamarine is rejected by Raymond when they first meet. Hailey and Claire promise to make Raymond fall in love with her in the next three days using strategies found in teen magazines. A group of popular girls led by Cecilia Banks, the spoiled daughter of local meteorologist Storm Banks who is also interested in Raymond, attempt to sabotage Aquamarine by telling Raymond she has a boyfriend, something the girls manage to clear up, bringing them closer together.

Aquamarine and Raymond bond at "The Last Splash", a local celebration. She hastily leaves before the sun sets, but first kisses him and asks him to meet her on the pier in the morning. Cecilia follows the girls to the water tower where Aquamarine is staying and discovers her true secret. She unhooks the ladder to prevent Aquamarine from leaving and calls the news to expose her on national television. The town's mysterious handyman, Leonard, helps Aquamarine escape, and she grants him a wish. As punishment for publicly humiliating him, Storm confiscates Cecilia's pink Volkswagen convertible car.

The next morning at the pier, Aquamarine asks Raymond if he loves her. Raymond admits that he likes her, but has not fallen in love with her yet, as they have only been on one date and he wants to take his time getting to know her. Cecilia angrily approaches and pushes Aquamarine into the ocean, revealing her mermaid form to Raymond. He is shocked but rushes to get his rescue board to save her, much to Cecilia's dismay and rage.

Aquamarine's father summons a giant storm to drag her back home, but Hailey and Claire jump into the ocean to her aid. When Aquamarine asks why they risked their lives to save her, they respond that they love her. The power of the girls' friendship finally convinces Aquamarine's father of true love's existence, and the storm subsides. Realizing how hard Hailey's mother has worked for her job, the girls decide to save their wish for something else and say goodbye to Aquamarine, who promises to visit. Raymond also asks Aquamarine to promise to visit him and they share a kiss. Back on shore, Raymond thanks the girls for their bravery and for introducing him to Aquamarine. Hailey and Claire tell each other they will miss each other, and part ways.

== Cast ==
- Emma Roberts as Claire Brown
- Joanna "JoJo" Levesque as Hailey Rogers
- Sara Paxton as Aquamarine
- Jake McDorman as Raymond
- Arielle Kebbel as Cecilia Banks
- Claudia Karvan as Ginny Rogers
- Bruce Spence as Leonard
- Tammin Sursok as Marjorie
- Roy Billing as Bob Brown
- Julia Blake as Maggie Brown
- Shaun Micallef as Storm Banks
- Lulu McClatchy as Bonnie
- Natasha Cunningham as Patty
- Dichen Lachman as Beth
- Lincoln Lewis as Theo
- Alice Hunter as Beach Girl
- Benjamin Shields as Beach Boy

=== Voices ===
- Emma Roberts as Claire's starfish earrings
- Joanna "JoJo" Levesque as Hailey's starfish earrings
- Sara Paxton as Aquamarine's starfish earrings

== Production ==
Although the movie is set in Florida, the film actually took place in Queensland, Australia. Production began in February 2005 and wrapped up in April of that same year.

The film used a combination of practical and computer-generated effects to create Aquamarine's mermaid appearance. Her mermaid tail was designed by creature effects designer Jason Baird, who worked with the visual effects company Animal Logic. Five different versions of the tail were created for the character to use throughout the film.

Animal Logic completed 154 visual effects shots for the movie. These included Aquamarine's transformations between her human and mermaid forms, underwater scenes, ocean waves, and the storm sequence and the end of the film. Some scenes were filmed in a water tank and later combined with computer-generated backgrounds and effects. The team also worked on smaller details throughout the movie, such as the talking starfish earrings, fireworks, and the extension of the weather tower.

== Home media ==
The film was released on DVD on June 13, 2006, and on Blu-ray on March 6, 2012.

== Reception ==
=== Box office ===
In its opening weekend, Aquamarine grossed $7.5 million in 2,512 theaters, ranking #5 at the box office. By the end of its run, the film grossed $18.6 million domestically, and $4.4 million internationally, for a worldwide total of $23 million.

=== Critical response ===
On review aggregator Rotten Tomatoes, the film has an approval rating of 53% based on reviews from 89 critics, with an average rating of 5.5/10. The site's consensus states: "A lighthearted, gum-smacking, boy-crazy film with a hopeful message for young girls." On Metacritic, Aquamarine has a weighted average score of 51 out of 100, based on 27 reviews, indicating "mixed or average" reviews. Audiences surveyed by CinemaScore gave the film a grade of "A−" on scale of A to F.

Michael Rechtshaffen of The Hollywood Reporter called Aquamarine a "bright and breezy tween fantasy romantic comedy that coasts along on its charming performances and the light comedic touch of first-time feature director Elizabeth Allen." Variety's Joe Leydon praised the film, writing, "The high-concept premise ... has been fleshed out with inventive wit, unsticky warmth and more than a little wackiness. Result is an unusually likeable family-friendly comedy that could appeal far beyond its target [audience]".

Numerous critics praised the film's themes and message. Grading the film a "B−", Chris Kaltenbach of The Baltimore Sun liked how "Aquamarine exhibits a welcome empathy for adolescent girls and an understanding of how they interact" while teaching the difference between "what is important (friendship, self-confidence, altruism) and what seems important (puppy love, trendiness, running with the pack)." Describing Aquamarine as engendering a "vision of cherished sisterhood", Callie Ahlgrim of Insider wrote that the film "is a rom-com insofar as it tells a boy-meets-girl story—but the deeper, more honest love between its young female leads is the film's true emotional core." Wesley Morris of The Boston Globe wrote that Aquamarine "is unique because it's the rare movie that fiercely respects the altruistic loyalty that bonds girls to one another." Ruthe Stein of the San Francisco Chronicle found that while the film "has a sweetness and innocence that makes it near perfect entertainment for its target audience", Aquamarine "avoids seeming coy and doesn't flinch from taking on serious issues that illustrate that life isn't all fluff even for the young." Rating the film 3 out of 5 stars, Roger Moore of the Orlando Sentinel wrote, "Aquamarine really is just an adorable movie. And along the way, life lessons about love, friendship, adjusting to bad news and overcoming grief are passed along in a not-that-obvious fashion." Rating it 3 out of 4 stars, Todd Hertz of Christianity Today wrote, "The movie scores a major victory in reaching its audience with the all-too-important message that they are fine just the way they are."

Other critics were less positive. Carrie Rickey of The Philadelphia Inquirer wrote, "Like its title character, Allen's choppy and inconsistent film has two speeds, ditsy or sentimental, and never gathers momentum." Reviewing Aquamarine for the BBC, Stella Papamichael rated the film 2 out of 5 stars, writing, "the worthy message about the value of friendship, central to Alice Hoffman’s novel, is drowned out by a sappy, magazine-style portrait of girlhood that’s all lip-gloss and giggles." Marrit Ingman of The Austin Chronicle also rated the film 2 out of 5 stars but enjoyed some aspects, like its making fun of the dating advice in teen magazines such as CosmoGirl.

Critics praised the cast's performances. Calling Paxton's portrayal of Aquamarine "impish, anxious and ebullient", Leydon hailed her "impressive talent for physical comedy", while Rechtshaffen wrote that Paxton "has an infectious, nutty energy". Roger Ebert praised Roberts and Levesque for their "unstudied charm", while Leydon lauded their "credible and compelling relationship with each other" as well as their "pitch-perfect reactions as straight women" to Paxton. Stein highlighted Roberts's performance, particularly her portrayal of Claire's vulnerability.

=== Accolades ===
Year	Result	Award	Category	Recipients
2006	Nominated	Teen Choice Awards	Choice Movie: Chick Flick	
2006	Nominated	Teen Choice Awards	Choice Movie Breakout Star – Female	JoJo
2007	Nominated	Nickelodeon Australian Kids' Choice Awards	Fave Movie Star	Emma Roberts
2007	Won	Young Artist Awards	Best Performance in a Feature Film – Supporting Young Actress	Emma Roberts
2007	Nominated	Young Artist Awards	Best Performance in a Feature Film – Supporting Young Actress	JoJo
2007	Nominated	Young Artist Awards	Best Performance in a Feature Film – Leading Young Actress	Sara Paxton

=== Legacy ===
Since its release, Aquamarine has become a cult film, and is especially popular among Generation Z. It has been ranked as one of the best "mermaid movies" by USA Today, as well as Teen Vogue. Chappell Roan cited the film as the inspiration for the music video for her 2022 single "Casual", telling Teen Vogue that the concept for the video was "Aquamarine but like, gay".

== Soundtrack ==
Aquamarine

Soundtrack album by various artists
- Released: February 21, 2006
- Genres: Teen pop; pop rock; post-punk revival; dance-rock
- Labels: Epic; Sony BMG; Sony Music Soundtrax; Fox

1. One Original Thing – Cheyenne Kimball
2. Strike – Nikki Flores
3. Connected – Sara Paxton
4. Gentlemen – Teddy Geiger
5. One and Only – Teitur
6. Island in the Sun – Emma Roberts
7. Time for Me to Fly – Jonas Brothers
8. Can't Behave – Courtney Jaye
9. Summertime Guys – Nikki Cleary
10. One Way or Another – Mandy Moore
11. Sweet Troubled Soul – Stellastarr
12. I Like the Way – Bodyrockers

Two of the film's stars, Roberts and Paxton, were featured on the soundtrack. In 2008, La La Land Records and Fox Music released a limited edition CD (1000 pressings) of David Hirschfelder's score (incorporating Paxton's voice) for the film.

1. Main Titles
2. The Storm
3. Washed Ashore
4. Claire Falls In
5. Meeting Aqua
6. The Next Morning/Shell Phone Call
7. Making the Deal
8. Ray & Aqua/Magazines
9. Paddleboat Date
10. The Water Tower
11. Hailey Rides the Dolphins
12. Aqua's Decision
13. First Kiss
14. Cecilia Climbs the Tower
15. Hailey and Claire Argue
16. The Pier/Storm/The Buoy
17. The Tear/Goodbyes
18. Finale

Other songs featured in the film

- A Comer Chicharron (Guaracha) – Charanga Cubana
- City Girls Jr. – Simon Leadley
- Control Me – The A-Team
- Dejenme Vivir – Charanga Cubana
- Don't Cry Baby – Alana Dafonseca
- Drive Me Crazy – Miss Eighty 6
- I Rock Hard – Miss Eighty 6
- Island in the Sun – Halfday
- Underground – Puretone
- Smile 2005 – Vitamin C
- Right Now 2004 – Atomic Kitten

== Sequel series ==
In June 2026, a sequel series pilot was ordered by Disney with Roberts to reprise her role as a guest star and executive producer. In August 2026, Jake McDorman was announced to return as Raymond, who will now be a single father to his daughter with Aquamarine, Coral, played by Kenzi Richardson, since her disappearance, and will also serve as executive producer. The series also welcomes regulars Briella Guiza, as Coral’s friend Mia, Theodore Dalton, as August a local town surfer, and Annika Reese, as mean girl Paige. The films director Elizabeth Allen Rosenbaum will also return to the director’s seat and will executive produce the series, along with film producer Susan Cartsonis.

== See also ==
- Mermaids in popular culture
