= Smith & Wesson Model 39 =

Smith & Wesson Model 39-2
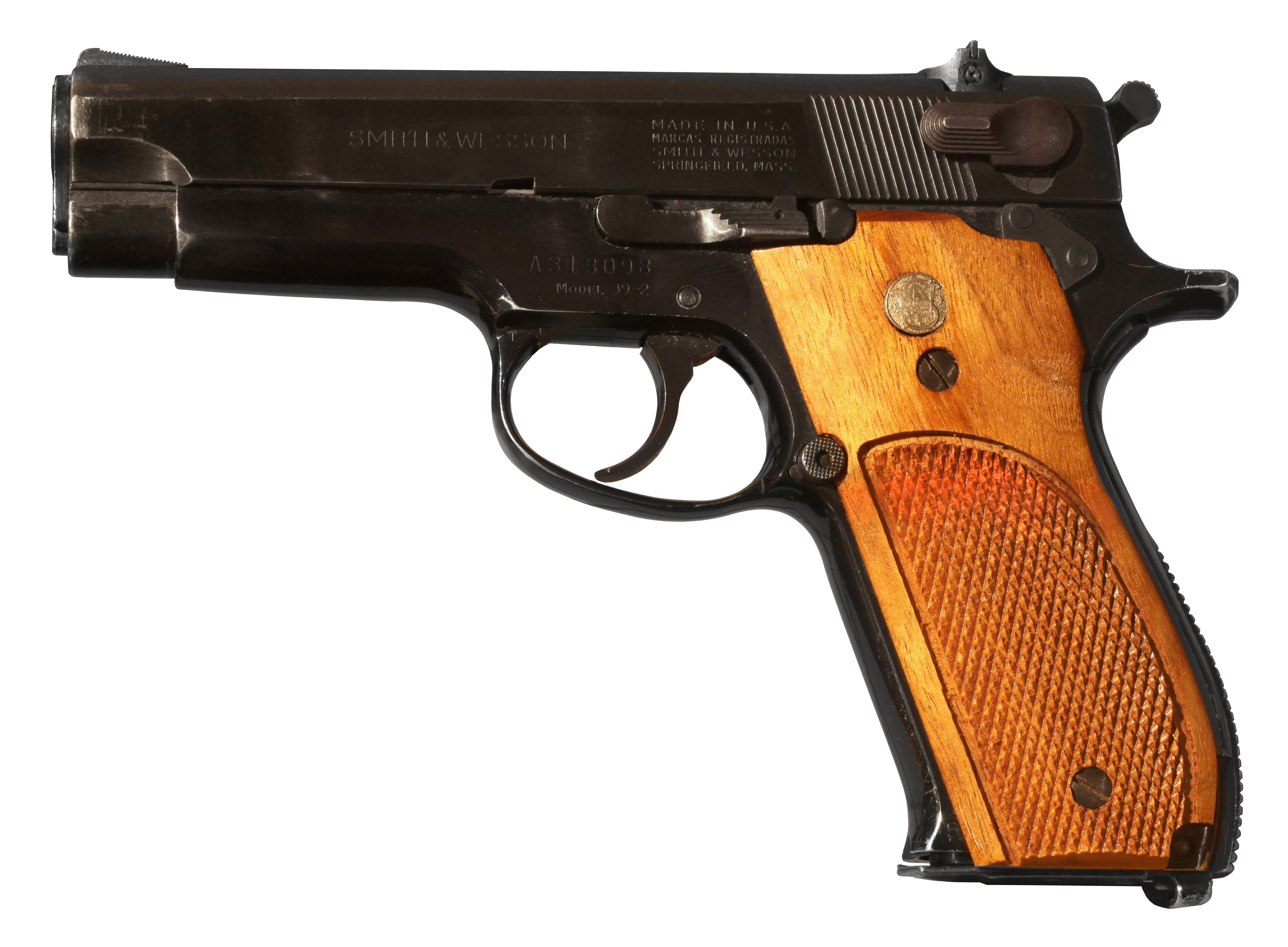
- Smith & Wesson Model 39 of the Gendarmerie of Vaud, on display at Morges castle museum.
- Type: Semi-automatic pistol
- Place of origin: United States

Service history
- Wars: Vietnam War; Laotian Civil War; Cambodian Civil War

Production history
- Produced: 1954–1983

Specifications
- Mass: 28 oz. / 1.71 lbs. (0.780 kg)
- Length: 7.55” (192 mm)
- Barrel length: 4” (102 mm)
- Cartridge: 9x19mm Parabellum
- Action: Short recoil, DA
- Rate of fire: Semi-automatic
- Feed system: 8-round single column, detachable box magazine

The Smith & Wesson Model 39 is a semiautomatic pistol developed for the United States Army service pistol trials of 1954. After the Army abandoned its search for a new pistol, the Model 39 went on the civilian market in 1955 and was the first of Smith & Wesson's first generation semi-automatic pistols.

A modified version saw limited use with Naval Special Warfare units as the Mk 22 Mod 0.

== History ==
During World War II, the German Walther P38 double-action/single-action pistol impressed American ordnance personnel so much that the Army Ordnance Corps issued a proposal for an American equivalent to the P38. In 1949, Smith & Wesson began development of the Model 39 chambered in 9×19mm Parabellum and it entered the market in 1955. It was the first U.S. designed double action (DA) semi-automatic pistol and was designed to replace the venerable M1911A1. The 1911 was still extremely popular with law enforcement, military, and civilian use, but only offered a single-action trigger and a heavy steel frame.

=== Mk 22 "Hush Puppy" ===
A modified version of the Model 39 with a wider grip frame to accommodate a 14-round magazine was used by Naval Special Warfare units during the Vietnam War. It was issued to officers-in-charge (OICs) of MST-2 detachments as their sidearm. SEAL Teams used either the Model 39 without modification or a modified version, the Mk 22 Mod 0, which was called the "Hush Puppy". The modified pistol had a suppressor with a slide lock (preventing the slide from moving backward upon firing, thereby decreasing produced noise). The Mk 22 Mod 0 had raised iron sights, to provide easier sighting over a bulky suppressor. The gun's purpose was to kill sentry dogs or guards without alarming the main target.

The Mk 22 was the basis for the later Smith & Wesson Model 59, retaining the original 9mm Parabellum caliber, but incorporating a wider aluminum frame with a straight backstrap to accommodate a double-column magazine that could hold 14 rounds. In 1967, the Illinois State Police adopted the Model 39, a breakthrough in introducing semi-automatic pistols to law enforcement. This publicity helped commercial sales and set the stage for the more acceptable Model 59 with its higher capacity magazine at least in undercover or detective police use where the double action feature (and the larger magazine capacity) was considered by many to be superior to single-stack semi-automatics and revolvers of the time.

The Model 39 was discontinued from production after 1983.

== Design ==
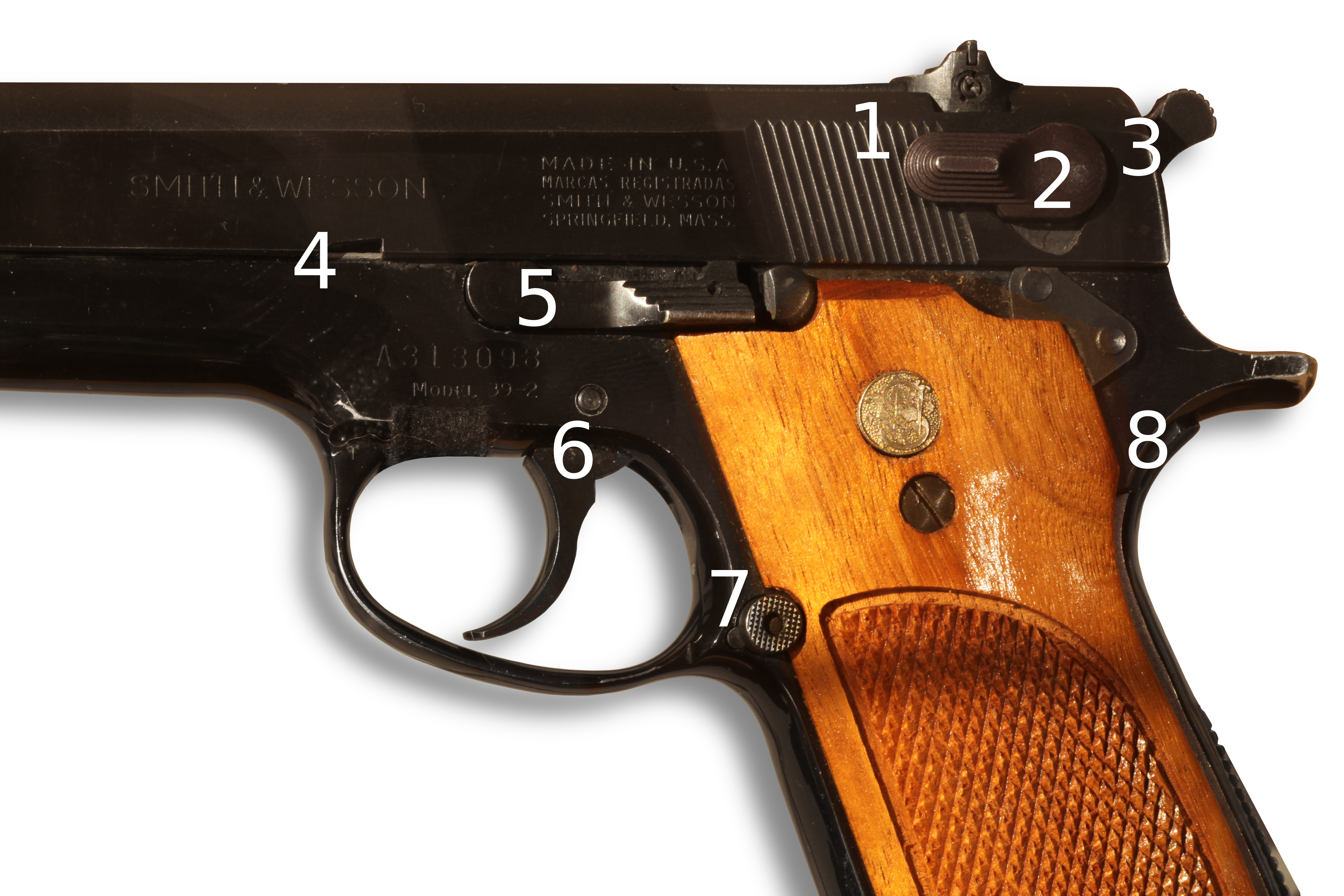
Details of the controls.

The Model 39 was designed with an anodized aluminum frame, a curved backstrap, and a blued carbon steel slide that carried the manual safety. The grip was of three pieces made of two walnut wood panels attached to the aluminum frame's handle with a screw. Later variants of the Model 39 would incorporate black polymer grips. The Model 39's magazine release is located at the rear of the trigger guard, a contrast to most European designs which were still using heel releases. The Model 39 used a conventional slide, barrel bushing, slide arrangement as opposed to the exposed barrel and falling locking block arrangement of the P38. Locking the slide into the barrel on a Model 39 locking is achieved by a modification of the Browning P35 (High Power) cam-locked breech.

First-generation Model 39 slides used either a long, spring steel extractor or a spring-loaded, pivoting claw extractor. Long extractors tended to be fragile and were replaced by the pivoting type. However, the long extractor proved to be more reliable than the pivoting version. The Model 39 employed many features common to the Walther P38 such as a combination safety and decocker that disconnected the trigger and hammer.

Smith & Wesson copied the 8-round single-stack magazine as well but added a magazine catch cutout to it in order to accommodate the button release near the trigger guard more popular on American pistols. The overall length of the Model 39 was 7.6 inches, the barrel is 4 inches long. The weight of the Model 39 was 1.72 pounds; this light weight is due to its aluminum frame.

== Variants ==
During early testing, a few Model 39s were produced with a steel frame. This steel-framed trial model provided the basis for the Model 52 target pistol. The Model 52 had a longer (5-inch) barrel and slide and was one of the few semi-automatic pistols ever chambered for the .38 Special cartridge (with flush-seated, full wadcutter bullets only). The shape of the rimmed cartridge limited the magazine capacity to five rounds. A further variant, the Model 952, in 9mm Luger, was produced in limited quantities by Smith & Wesson's Performance Center. The Model 52 was discontinued in 1992 when the machinery to manufacture the pistol broke down and it was deemed too costly to replace.

The original Model 39 is now known as a "first generation" design due to the number of similar designs that would be continuously developed into three generations of metal-frame semi-automatic pistols, which were produced until 2004. First-generation models use a 2-digit model number, second-generation uses 3 digits, and third-generation models use 4 digits. The second-generation version of the Model 39 was known as the 439 and was released in 1980. The 639 was also released, which was a 439 made entirely of stainless steel. In 1989, the 439 was replaced by the third-generation model, the 3904, which had its own stainless version, the 3906. The 3904 and 3906 were both discontinued in 1991 and more attention was given to higher capacity double stack models like the 5906. This marked the end of the Smith & Wesson Model 39 family and the entire third generation would later be discontinued in 1999 in favor of the cheaper Sigma line.

A variety of compact versions of the third-generation Model 39 were introduced by Smith & Wesson starting in 1990 featuring shortened frames and slides, including the models 3913, 3914, 3953, 3954, and 908. These pistols incorporated several innovations by Paris Theodore used on the ASP pistols and by Charles Kelsey on the Devel pistols, which were custom compact conversions of the Model 39.

The Model 39-2 was manufactured in 1971 out of concerns of reliability with heavy use of the pistol can easily wear down the extractor, barrel and feed ramp.

== Users ==
- Democratic Republic of the Congo: Land Forces of the Democratic Republic of the Congo.
- United States: United States Navy, Illinois State Police, Rhode Island State Police and the Covina, California Police Department.

== Gallery ==
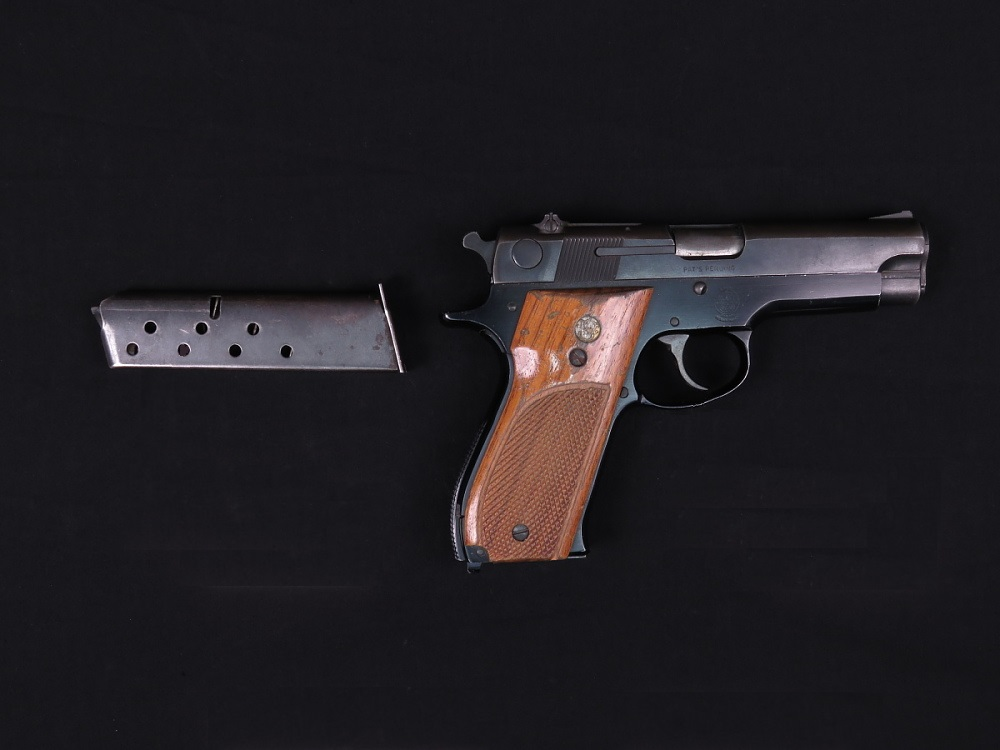
Smith & Wesson Model 39 Smithsonian photograph

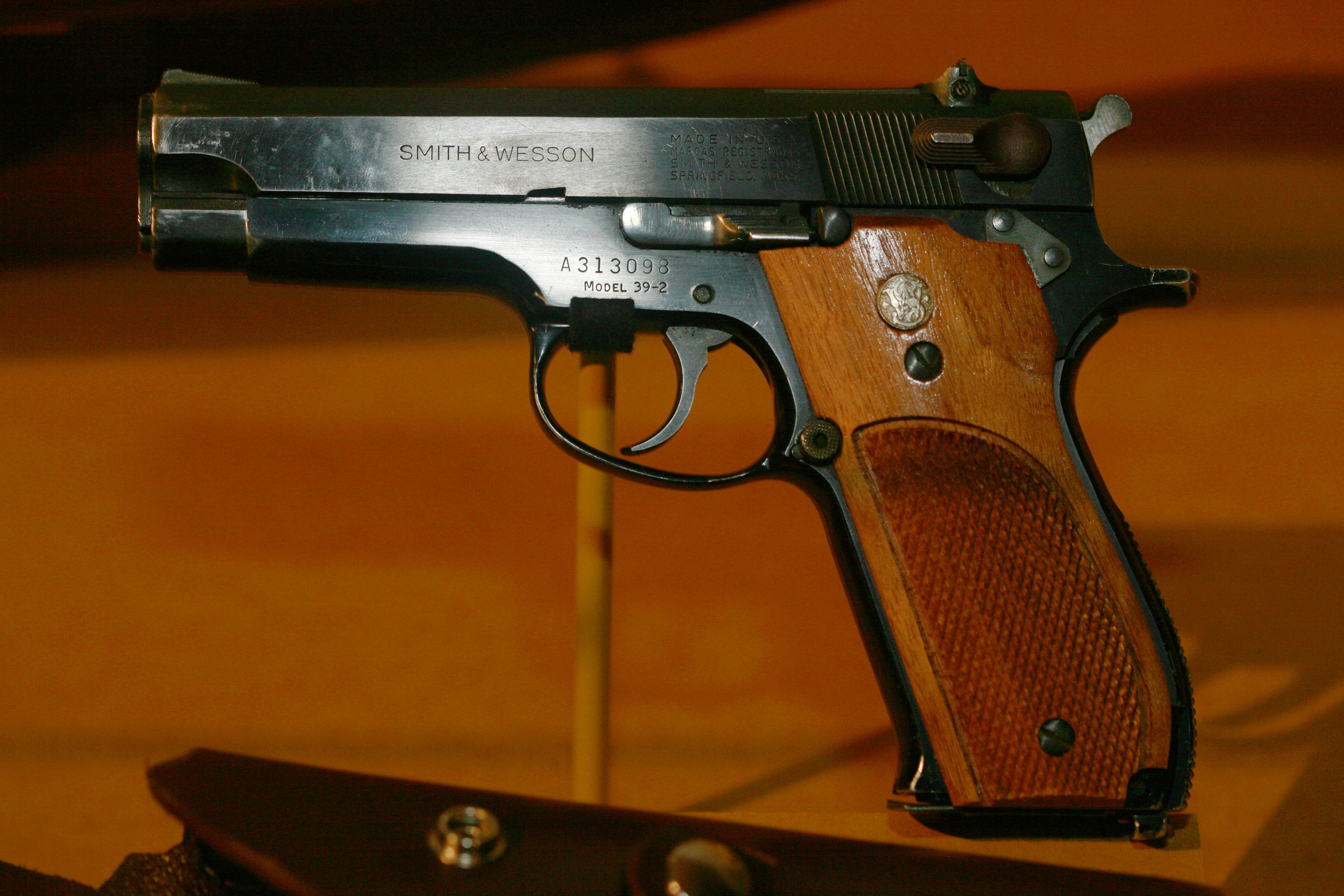
