= ASP pistol =

ASP
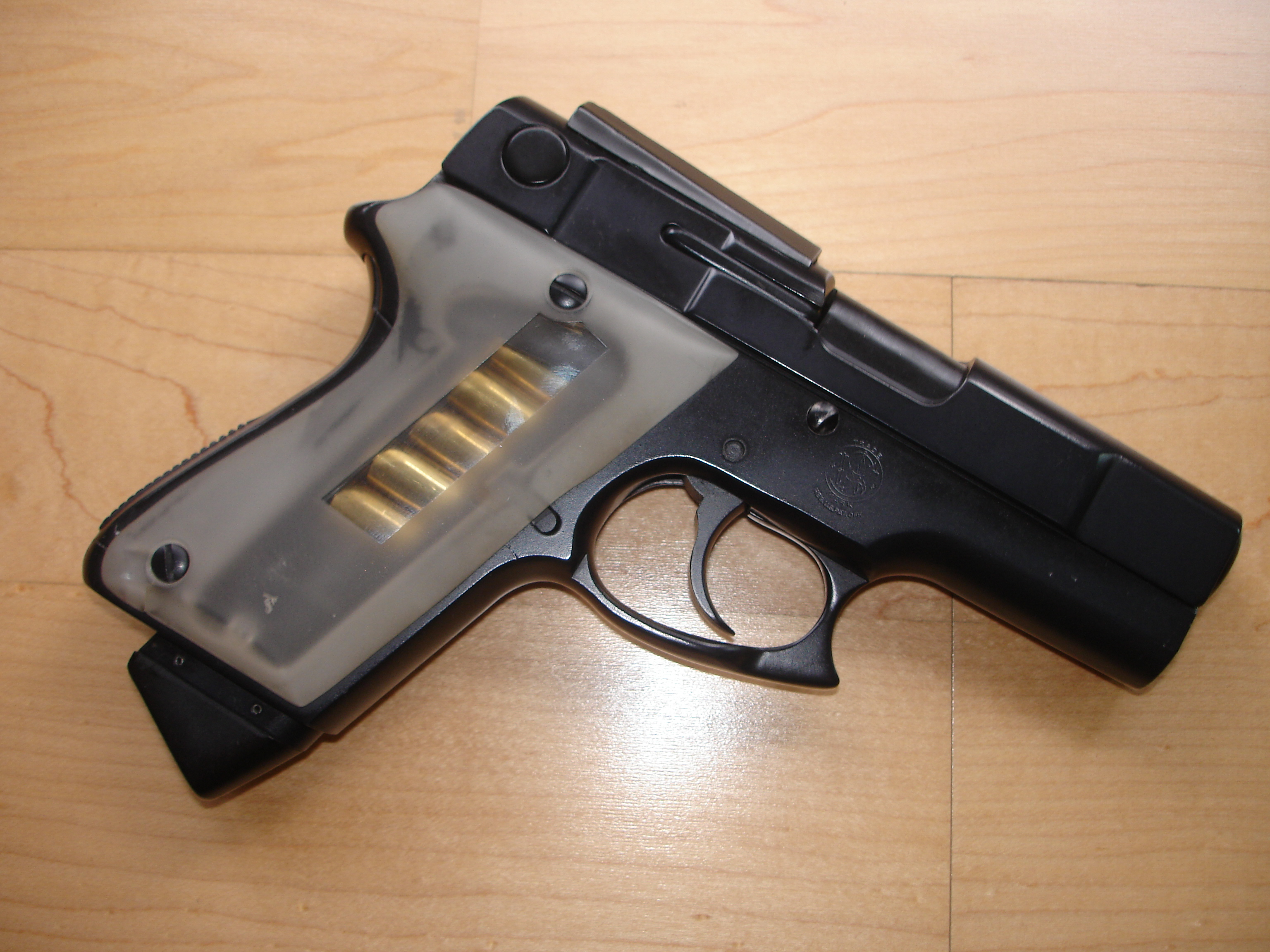
- ASP pistol (note ammunition visible through clear grip)
- Type: Pistol
- Place of origin: United States

Production history
- Designer: Paris Theodore
- Designed: 1960s
- Manufacturer: Armament Systems and Procedures
- Produced: 1970s–1987 2002–2007 (ASP 2000 tribute, not by ASP)
- No. built: 450

Specifications
- Mass: 680 g (1.50 lb)
- Barrel length: 82.5 mm (3.25 in)
- Cartridge: 9×19mm Parabellum
- Action: Double action, tilting barrel, locked breech
- Feed system: 7-round box magazine
- Sights: Guttersnipe

The ASP is a custom-made pistol designed and built by Paris Theodore (owner of Seventrees, Ltd., a custom gun leather shop in New York City) from the early 1970s to 1987. The ASP was based on the Smith & Wesson Model 39 pistol. The ASP featured clear Lexan grips allowing the shooter to see how much ammunition is left, a rounded hammer, hooked trigger guard, and no front sight. The ASP was responsible for later innovations made in the development of concealable handguns.

== Design ==
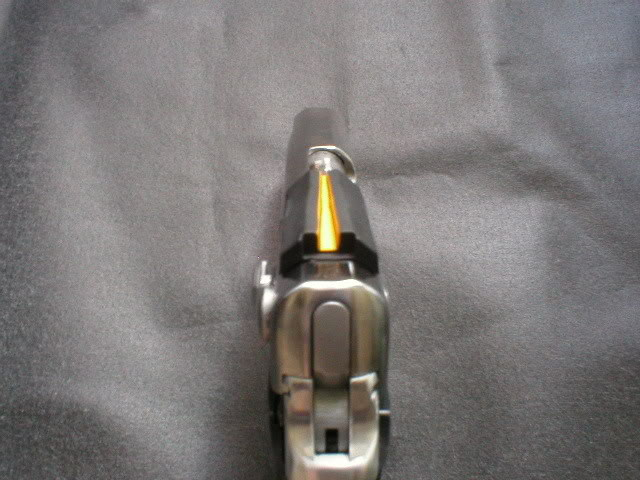
The "Guttersnipe" sights unique to the ASP. The sights become narrower from back to front, painted in bright yellow for faster target acquisition.

The ASP was a reworked Smith & Wesson Model 39 or 39-2, employing a shortened slide, a fixed bushing (in lieu of the Smith & Wesson designed collet bushing); the unique Guttersnipe sight system, clear Lexan grip-panels, a fully ramped and throated shortened barrel, and a smoothed and radiused profile to ensure no risk of snagging on the draw.

The fixed bushing was tightly fitted to the shortened barrel and dry-lubricated by durable Teflon-S, which was applied to all components of the pistol, except for the clear Lexan grip panels. The unique sighting system, referred to as the "Guttersnipe", was a narrowing U-channel with fluorescent yellow panels that would form three triangles, all pointed at the target when the sight was properly aligned.

Checkering was kept to a minimum, and reserved for the frontstrap and backstrap, as opposed to the grip panels, which were smooth to prevent the drawing hand from catching prematurely on draw, thereby minimizing the risk of any misalignment of the pistol during presentation, aiming, and firing.

The ASP was made in either right-handed, or left-handed models, as the extended trigger guard (which included a recurved hook for the index finger of the supporting hand, one of the earliest known instances of such a feature) was cut away on the side of the strong-sided hand (which would depend on the handedness of the individual using the pistol).

Included with the gun was a patented double magazine pouch which used a magnet to hold the spare magazines in place. The cost for the complete ASP modification package on a customer-supplied handgun was $475, and was done by a subsidiary company, Armament Systems and Procedures, Inc.

Production of holsters and magazine carriers for the ASP were contracted out to Ken Null, who still produces those designs. Theodore ceased production of the ASP in 1987.

== Devel pistol ==
In 1976, a gunsmith from Cleveland, Ohio named Charles Kelsey ordered an ASP pistol, but never received one. His experience led him to develop an improved version of the ASP. Working with firearms instructor Ken Hackathorn, he developed the Devel pistol.

The wood grips featured a clear Lexan insert, allowing the shooter a visual account of the number of rounds in the magazine. The pistols were coated in an electroless nickel finish and featured traditional sights. Kelsey sent a sample gun to Smith & Wesson, for a factory agreement to produce these pistols on a large scale. An agreement was never reached, but several of Kelsey's improvements were incorporated into the S&W 3913.

== In popular culture ==
Novelist John Gardner, successor of Ian Fleming as author of the James Bond novels, chose the ASP as the main weapon used by James Bond for the remainder of the continuation novels. The weapon also serves as Bond's sidearm in the 1989 comic book Permission to Die.

Sully (David Patrick Kelly) carries an ASP pistol as his sidearm of choice in the 1985 film Commando.

The ASP pistol is featured in Call of Duty: Black Ops.
