= Alvin and the Chipmunks: Chipwrecked (soundtrack) =

2011 soundtrack album

Alvin and the Chipmunks: Chipwrecked (Music from the Motion Picture)

Soundtrack album by The Chipmunks and The Chipettes
- Released: November 15, 2011
- Genres: Pop; rock; hip hop; dance
- Length: 42:43
- Label: Atlantic
- Producers: Ross Bagdasarian Jr.; Janice Karman; Ali Dee Theodore

The Chipmunks and The Chipettes chronology
| Alvin and the Chipmunks: The Squeakquel (Original Motion Picture Soundtrack) (2009) | Alvin and the Chipmunks: Chipwrecked (Music from the Motion Picture) (2011) | We're the Chipmunks (Music from the TV Show) (2015) |

Alvin and the Chipmunks (Original Motion Picture Score)

Film score by Christopher Lennertz
- Released: September 19, 2008
- Recorded: 2007
- Genre: Film score
- Length: 35:39
- Labels: 20th Century Fox; Fox Music; La-La Land Records

Christopher Lennertz chronology
| The Comebacks (2007) | Alvin and the Chipmunks (2007) | Meet the Spartans (2008) |

Alvin and the Chipmunks: Chipwrecked (Music from the Motion Picture) is the soundtrack to the 2011 film Alvin and the Chipmunks: Chipwrecked. Released through Atlantic Records on November 15, 2011, the album featured 13 songs that consisted of licensed popular hits covered by the Chipmunks and Chipettes and an original song specifically written for the film. The soundtrack was moderately successful in comparison to the predecessor's soundtracks.

== Album information ==
Like the predecessor, the soundtrack to Chipwrecked featured licensed music from popular artists as well as an original song "We Have Arrived" has been written for the film, performed by Rae featuring Classic.

The soundtrack was distributed by Atlantic Records unlike the first two films, whose albums were published by Rhino Entertainment. It was released on November 15, 2011, a month before the film's release. The album featured 12 songs along with a bonus track featured in the digital edition of the album. A limited edition was distributed to the Target Corporation retail chains across United States, whose album featured four exclusive bonus tracks. iTunes and Amazon.com released a deluxe edition available only on digital download containing three bonus tracks.

== Commercial performance ==
It debuted on the week of December 24, 2011, being charted at number 134. The album subsequently peaked in the consecutive weeks, where its highest position was at number 36 for the week of January 21, 2012.

== Track listing ==
Standard track listing
| No. | Title | Writer(s) | Performing artist(s) | Length |
|---|---|---|---|---|
| 1. | "Party Rock Anthem" | Peter Schroeder, Davide Jamahl Listenbee, Stefan Gordy, Skyler Gordy | The Chipmunks and The Chipettes | 4:14 |
| 2. | "Bad Romance" | Nadir Khayat, Stefani Germanotta | The Chipmunks and The Chipettes | 4:27 |
| 3. | "Trouble" | Alecia Moore, Tim Armstrong | The Chipmunks and The Chipettes | 3:08 |
| 4. | "Whip My Hair" | Ronald Jackson, Janae Ratliff | The Chipettes | 2:31 |
| 5. | "Vacation" | Charlotte Caffey, Kathy Valentine, Jane M. Wiedlin | The Chipmunks and The Chipettes (featuring Basko) | 2:59 |
| 6. | "We Have Arrived" | Ali Theodore, Michael Klein, Rachel Rickert, Julian Davis | RAE (featuring Classic) | 3:22 |
| 7. | "Say Hey (I Love You)" | Michael Franti, Carl Rogers Young | The Chipmunks and The Chipettes (featuring Nomadik) | 3:01 |
| 8. | "Real Wild Child" | Johnny O'Keefe, Johnny Greenan, Dave Owens | The Chipmunks and The Chipettes (featuring Nomadik) | 2:43 |
| 9. | "S.O.S." | J.R. Rotem, Evan "Kidd" Bogart, Ed Cobb | The Chipettes | 2:52 |
| 10. | "We No Speak Americano/Conga" | Nicola Selerno, Renato Carosone, Enrique Garcia | The Chipettes (featuring Barnetta DaFonseca) | 2:38 |
| 11. | "Survivor" | Beyoncé Knowles, Anthony Dent, Matthew Knowles | The Chipettes | 3:59 |
| 12. | "Born This Way/Ain't No Stoppin' Us Now/Firework" | Stefani Germanotta, Fernando Garibay, Paul Blair, Jeppe Laursen, Gene McFadden, John Whitehead, Jerry Cohen, Esther Dean, Mikkel Eriksen, Tom Hermansen, Katy Perry, Sandy Julien Wilhelm | The Chipmunks and The Chipettes | 2:47 |

Bonus track
| No. | Title | Writer(s) | Performing artist(s) | Length |
|---|---|---|---|---|
| 13. | "Club Can't Handle Me" | Michael Caren, Tramar Dillard, David Guetta, Carmen Michelle Key, Kasia Livingston, Frederic Riesterer, Giorgio Tuinfort | The Chipmunks and The Chipettes | 3:57 |
| Total length: | | | | 42:43 |

Target limited edition bonus tracks
| No. | Title | Writer(s) | Performing artist(s) | Length |
|---|---|---|---|---|
| 14. | "Love Train" | Kenneth Gamble, Leon Huff | The Chipmunks and The Chipettes | 2:47 |
| 15. | "Fly" | Stan Frazier, Murphy Karges, Mark McGarth, Rodney Shappard, Joseph "McG" Nichol | The Chipmunks | 3:18 |
| 16. | "Help" | John Lennon, Paul McCartney | The Chipmunks and The Chipettes | 2:19 |
| 17. | "Jungle Boogie" | Ronald Bell, Claydes Eugene Smith, Robert Spike Mickens, Donald Boyce, Richard Westfield, Dennis Ronald Thomas, Robert Earl Bell, George Brown | The Chipmunks and The Chipettes | 1:22 |
| Total length: | | | | 52:32 |

Digital deluxe edition bonus tracks
| No. | Title | Writer(s) | Performing artist(s) | Length |
|---|---|---|---|---|
| 14. | "Hello" | Martin Solveig, Martina Sorbara | The Chipettes | 3:07 |
| 15. | "Holiday" | Rivers Cuomo | The Chipmunks and The Chipettes | 3:07 |
| 16. | "We'll Be Alright" | Rob Coombes, Danny Goffey, Phillip Lawrence, Bruno Mars, Mick Quinn, Jonathan Yip, Ray Romulus, Jeremy Reeves | The Chipmunks and The Chipettes (featuring Basko) | 3:14 |
| Total length: | | | | 49:45 |

== Chart performance ==
=== Weekly charts ===
Weekly chart performance for Alvin and the Chipmunks: Chipwrecked (Music from the Motion Picture)
| Chart (2011–2012) | Peak position |
|---|---|
| Australian Albums (ARIA) | 23 |
| New Zealand Albums (RMNZ) | 14 |
| Scottish Albums (OCC) | 58 |
| UK Albums (OCC) | 61 |
| UK Soundtrack Albums (OCC) | 1 |
| US Billboard 200 | 36 |
| US Top Soundtracks (Billboard) | 2 |

=== Year-end charts ===
Year-end chart performance for Alvin and the Chipmunks: Chipwrecked (Music from the Motion Picture)
| Chart (2012) | Position |
|---|---|
| US Soundtrack Albums (Billboard) | 13 |
