= Aquamarine (novel) =

2001 novel by Alice Hoffman

- First edition
- Author: Alice Hoffman
- Series: Water Tales #1
- Publisher: Scholastic
- Publication date: 2001
- ISBN: 9781405203630

Aquamarine is a novel by Alice Hoffman, published in April 2001. A film adaptation was released in 2006, although the plot of the film bears little resemblance to that of the book.

== Plot summary ==
The story is based upon two schoolgirls, Hailey and Claire, who have lived as neighbors and close best friends for many years. Their favorite place for amusement has been the Capri Beach Club for as long as they can remember. However, the Capri Beach Club has become ruinous via neglect by its staff. When Claire's grandparents, with whom she lives, decide to leave the area and move to Florida, the girls are dismayed. They spend hours trying to make their last days together as long as possible, both frightened by the future because each one would be alone.

When a violent thunderstorm occurs, a large quantity of trash is deposited in the Capri Beach Club. In the swimming pool, Hailey and Claire discover the spoiled yet beautiful creature that will change their lives: a mermaid named Aquamarine. The next morning, Aquamarine surfaces after some hesitation, being stimulated to do so by the presence of the handsome Raymond. During the night, Aquamarine has undergone mild hardships; she has eaten very little, has been separated from her six sisters, and is suffering from the chlorine in the pool. Hailey and Claire advise Aquamarine to return to the ocean, however she refuses, because of her new attachment to Raymond.

Claire and Hailey read books that contain information pertaining to marine life-forms, trying to find an answer to Aquamarine's troubling conditions. They learn that mermaids cannot survive on land for more than a week. The necessity of returning Aquamarine to the ocean is thus made more urgent. In order to persuade Aquamarine to return to her home, Hailey and Claire arrange that she will spend one evening with Raymond, after which she must leave. To compensate for her nudity and lack of legs, they plan to dress her in a long blue gown and place her in a wheelchair. Before the meeting, the two girls confide their story in Claire's grandfather, Maury. He believes their story because of his own encounter with a mermaid once. He takes them to the Capri Beach Club, where they organize the table and food for Aquamarine and Raymond. They then lift Aquamarine out of the pool—an operation wherein Claire must overcome a hesitation to enter water—and introduce her to Raymond. To explain her acquaintance with them, they present her as a distant cousin.

Raymond is awestruck by Aquamarine, with whom he spends the evening happily. Meanwhile, Claire and Hailey begin to embrace their future and rekindle their hope. At 9 o'clock, they take Aquamarine back to the swimming pool. As she leaves, Aquamarine gives Raymond a seashell, by which to contact her by speaking her name into it; she will hear this call regardless of their relative positions. Hailey and Claire sleep together in Claire's soon-to-be-vacant house, which has been made empty of furniture. They have by now grown very fond of Aquamarine, and she of them. Hailey and Claire arrive to take Aquamarine back to the ocean. They meet Raymond, who regrets that he cannot bid Aquamarine farewell before he leaves for Florida. Just then, a boy named Arthur falls into the swimming pool. Aquamarine rescues him, with the help of Raymond. Raymond, seeing her tail and thus realizing she is a mermaid, is utterly shocked, however, this discovery does nothing to impair his adoration of her.

Hailey and Claire carry Aquamarine to the ocean and cast her into the water, where she is restored to full health and strength. They promise never to forget her and return to the Capri Beach Club, thanking its owner for the best summer of their lives. Claire and her grandparents later move away to Florida. After her departure, the Capri Beach Club is dismantled. Hailey does not tell Claire about this because she wants Claire to remember the Capri Beach Club as it once was. In Florida, Claire learns to swim and encounters Raymond, who has come to live nearby. From him, she learns that Aquamarine is in the vicinity. Claire thinks to take a photograph of the mermaid, but defers on the grounds that Hailey will soon visit.

== See also ==
- Aquamarine (film)
