= Lee Theodore =

American dancer, choreographer, and dance preservationist

- Born: Lee Becker; August 13, 1933; Newark, New Jersey
- Died: September 3, 1987 (aged 54)
- Spouse: Paris Theodore (m. 1962)
- Children: 3, including Ali Dee Theodore

Lee Theodore (August 13, 1933 – September 3, 1987) was an American Broadway dancer, choreographer, director, and dance preservationist. She founded the American Dance Machine in 1976 as a company dedicated to reconstructing, performing, and preserving musical-theatre choreography.

== Work as a dancer and choreographer ==
Theodore, then performing as Lee Becker, appeared on Broadway as a Royal Dancer in the original production of The King and I and later played Anybodys in the original production of West Side Story.

She later moved into choreography and directing. Her Broadway credits included choreography for Baker Street, musical staging for Flora the Red Menace, choreography for The Apple Tree and Darling of the Day, and directing and choreographing Noël Coward's Sweet Potato. For The Apple Tree, Theodore was nominated for the 1967 Tony Award for Best Choreography.

Her later Broadway work included musical staging and dances for the 1973 revival of Oliver! and assisting with the reproduction of Jerome Robbins's choreography for the 1980 revival of West Side Story.

Her work also extended to film. Theodore choreographed the 1970 musical Song of Norway; Variety praised her staging of the film's musical numbers.

== Work in choreography preservation ==
In 1976, Theodore founded the American Dance Machine, conceived as a "living archive" of Broadway theatre dance at a time when choreography was often lost once a production closed. The company's purpose was not simply to document dances, but to reconstruct and perform them so that they remained part of a living theatrical tradition.

Theodore's reconstruction process drew on performers who had danced in the original productions. In what became known as "rescue sessions", former cast members returned to the studio and rebuilt choreography from memory, sometimes beginning with fragments of steps before reconstructing larger sequences. Once recovered, dances could be taught, performed, filmed and notated. Contemporary coverage described the company as an effort to prevent notable show dances from disappearing with the productions for which they had been created.

American Dance Machine preserved and performed choreography associated with artists including Agnes de Mille, Jack Cole, Joe Layton, Michael Kidd, Ron Field, Bob Fosse, Onna White, Peter Gennaro and others. The 1978 Broadway production included reconstructed choreography from works such as Carousel, Brigadoon, Cabaret, Little Me and No, No, Nanette, with Theodore directing and supervising the production. The Broadway engagement ran for 199 performances.

Theodore also treated preservation as a teaching practice. At Harkness House in New York, she developed a theatre-dance curriculum that connected Broadway choreography with the popular dance styles from which it had emerged. A 1978 Dance Magazine profile described Theodore leading classes with live musicians and teaching students styles from successive periods, including the Charleston and tango of the 1920s, the one-step of the 1930s, the lindy of the 1940s, and the jitterbug and samba of the 1950s. The curriculum reflected Theodore's broader aim of transmitting musical-theatre movement through performance and training rather than preserving it only as archival documentation.

Theodore received a Dance Magazine Award in 1982, recognizing her contribution to dance.

== Personal life and death ==
She was married to the Israeli artist and writer Yoram Kaniuk in the 1950s.

Theodore married American inventor and gunsmith Paris Theodore in 1962. Together they had three sons, Ali and Said Theodore, and filmmaker Paris Kain.

Theodore died on September 3, 1987, in New York City.
