= American Dance Machine =

Former theatrical dance company

The American Dance Machine was a theatrical dance company created by Lee Theodore, which played on Broadway at the Century Theatre, opening Jun 14, 1978 and in total running 199 performances. It was duplicated with a second cast for the American Dance Festival at Duke University in 1978.

== Choreography and artists ==
The show was a "Living Archive" of Broadway theatre dance; great theatre dances saved from oblivion. Films were made of the performances to preserve original Broadway choreography and can be found at the Lincoln Center Library of the Performing Arts in New York City. Broadway legend Gwen Verdon appeared a film version of the show in 1981 for Showtime. Choreographers included: Agnes De Mille, Jack Cole, Joe Layton, Michael Kidd, Ron Field, Bob Fosse, Onna White and Peter Gennaro. Featured dancers and guest artists included Janet Eilber, Carol Estey, Harold Cromer, Liza Gennaro, Patti Mariano, Nancy Chismar, Randy Skinner and Donald Young.

== School ==
The American Dance Machine was also a school in New York City and later on Long Island at the American Theater Dance Workshop that taught original Broadway dance repertoire in the late 1970s and 1980s until Lee Theodore's death in 1986. Teachers included founder Lee Theodore, Nanette Charisse and Gwen Verdon. Dance repertoire for classes and shows included Can-Can, Brigadoon, Little Me, Shenandoah, The Boyfriend, Carousel, Cabaret, Finian's Rainbow, West Side Story, Sweet Charity, George M!, Gentlemen Prefer Blondes, The Unsinkable Molly Brown, Half a Sixpence, Walking Happy and No No Nanette.

== American Dance Machine for the 21st Century ==
In February, 2012, former dancer Nikki Feirt Atkins revived the organization as American Dance Machine for the 21st Century (ADM21, Inc.) in order to continue the legacy of the late Lee Theodore and The American Dance Machine. ADM's original mission was to preserve "great theatre dances saved from oblivion" and ADM21 continues that mission; to ensure that significant musical theater choreography, and the techniques that propel such works, would be preserved, studied and shared in the 21st century; to present “iconic choreography exactly as it was intended."

In collaboration with the stagers authorized by each choreographer, ADM21 has reconstructed work by choreographers including Jack Cole, Bob Fosse, Tommy Tune, Gower Champion, Susan Stroman, Agnes de Mille, Jerome Robbins and Michael Bennett.

In December 2015 a sold-out two-week run of a new production by ADM21 was presented at the Joyce Theatre which included 18 numbers from shows including Oklahoma!, West Side Story, The Who's Tommy, Singin' in the Rain, Grand Hotel and A Chorus Line. The New York Times called this production "the best such anthology I’ve seen since Jerome Robbins’ Broadway."
