= Ali Dee Theodore =

American music producer (born 1970)

Ali "Dee" Theodore
- Born: Ali Theodore; 1970 (age 55–56); Manhattan, New York City, US
- Other name: Ali Dee (Kid Panic)
- Occupations: composer; record producer; sound mixer; rapper; breakdancer; entrepreneur; business owner; talent manager
- Parents: Paris Theodore (father); Lee Theodore (mother)
- Relatives: Cyd Charisse (great-aunt); Nana Visitor (aunt); Nenette (Charisse) Tucker (grandmother); Eugene Becker (unce)
- Awards: American Music Award for Favorite Soundtrack 2008
- Musical career
- Genres: Boom bap; hip-hop; hardcore hip-hop; electronic; house music; pop
- Instrument: Vocals
- Works: Ali Dee discography
- Years active: 1988–present
- Labels: EMI America Records (1993-present); Chrysalis Records (1989); A&M Records as "Mister Jones" (1998); RCA Records as The Grand Skeep (2000)
- Website: www.instagram.com/alideeofficial/

Ali Theodore, known professionally as Ali Dee Theodore, is an American rapper, composer, songwriter, business owner, and music producer, based in Manhattan, New York City. He is also the founder and owner of the now-closed DeeTown Entertainment and, with partner Dave Jordan, founder of the publishing company Canvas 1 from 2002 to 2012, which was affiliated with BMI.

== Early life and education ==
Ali Theodore was born in Manhattan, New York City, United States in 1970. His mother was Broadway director, choreographer and performer Lee Theodore and his father Paris Theodore was a covert weapons designer for the CIA and NSA. Actress Cyd Charisse was his aunt.

== Career ==
Theodore released hip hop recordings in the late 1980s and 1990s before focusing on composition and production for film and television. He led DeeTown Entertainment, a New York-based music production company.

According to the box-office database The Numbers, Theodore is credited as executive music producer on three films in the Alvin and the Chipmunks franchise; those films collectively grossed over $1.15 billion worldwide, and the site lists him as ranked #3 by worldwide box office among executive music producers it tracks.

For Disney’s global Mickey Mouse 90th celebration, Theodore wrote and produced the original single "It's a Good Time" for use across Disney parks and around ABC’s Mickey's 90th Spectacular broadcast. In addition, published credits and industry listings cite Theodore's Disney work on multiple franchises and series, including co-writing/producing the Disney Channel single “BAMM” from Zombies and producing "All the Way Up" for Shake It Up: Break It Down (Walt Disney Records). Other Disney titles he has worked on include Descendants, Beverly Hills Chihuahua, Kickin’ It, Teen Beach Movie, and Hannah Montana.

His work also appears on major studio soundtracks such as Despicable Me 4 (2024), and VeggieTales: Celery Night Fever (2014).

== Businesses ==
Theodore is the founder and owner of the New York–based music production company DeeTown Entertainment. He has also operated the publishing entity Canvas 1, noted in industry profiles as affiliated with BMI.

Since 2021, Theodore has been affiliated with Music Nation Copyrights Management in the United Arab Emirates.

== Recognition and accolades ==
- Named to Crain’s New York Business “40 Under 40” (2010).
- The soundtrack to Alvin and the Chipmunks won Favorite/Top Soundtrack at the 2008 American Music Awards (album award).

== Discography ==
=== Ali Dee and the Forty Thieves ===
Ali Dee and the Forty Thieves (Cassette, Advance, Album, Promo); EMI Records Group North America, EMI Genre: Hip Hop Style: Boom bap, Hardcore Hip-Hop Released: 1992

New rapper Dee breaks a sweat on this fun and danceable pop/hip -hop romp. His rapid -fire phrasing is a good contrast to the track's air -punching chants at the chorus. Crisp beats and slowly insinuating melody add up to a potential hit at several formats -but don't be surprised if urban is first to jump aboard. Also, check out "Bring It On" on the flipside.

— Larry Flick, editor for Billboard Singles Reviews pg. 107, November 28, 1992, 11:45pm

=== Bring It On ===
Released: 1993 on EMI America Records Genre: Hip Hop Style: Boom Bap, Hardcore Hip-Hop

No.	Title	Writer(s)	Length
1.	"Batter Up"	Ali Theodore; Juice; L.O.; Michael Sandlofer	3:25
2.	"Bring It On" (featuring Kool G Rap)	Theodore; Nathaniel Wilson; Donovan Leitch	4:10
3.	"How Ya Feel"		0:25
4.	"Hit Em In Da Head"	Theodore; Juice; L.O.; Sandlofer	2:52
5.	"Who's Da Flava"	Theodore; Cash Ellington; Juice; Curtis Mayfield	3:46
6.	"Tap Skinz"	Theodore; Juice; L.O.; Spade; Hudson Whittaker	3:32
7.	"Flip Cassette"		0:14
8.	"Da Mann"		0:15
9.	"Styles Upon Styles" (featuring Phife)	Theodore; Juice; Malik Taylor; Sandlofer; Spade	3:45
10.	"Take It Back"	Theodore; Ellington; James Douglas; Sandy Linzer	4:46
11.	"Dee Swings Jazz"		0:29
12.	"Got 2 B Real"	Theodore; Juice; Sandlofer	3:56
13.	"Crazy Swift"	Theodore; Jeff Lorber; Juice; L.O.; Spade	3:29
14.	"Murder At Midnight"		0:41
15.	"Stompin' Committee" (featuring Law & Key and The Vibe Tribe)	Theodore; Juice; Spade; L.O.; Keith Lowe; Lawrence Lowe	3:38
Total length:			39:40

- DJ Clark Kent – scratches (2, 5)
- Kool G Rap – vocals (2)
- Phife – vocals (9)
- Stacy Heineke – backing vocals (10)
- Vicky Ramptom – backing vocals (10)
- Law & Key – vocals (15)
- The Vibe Tribe – vocals (15)

=== Other album versions ===
These were other release versions in 1993. Bring It On (LP, Promo); EMI Records USA, EMI Records Group North America
