= Brough House =

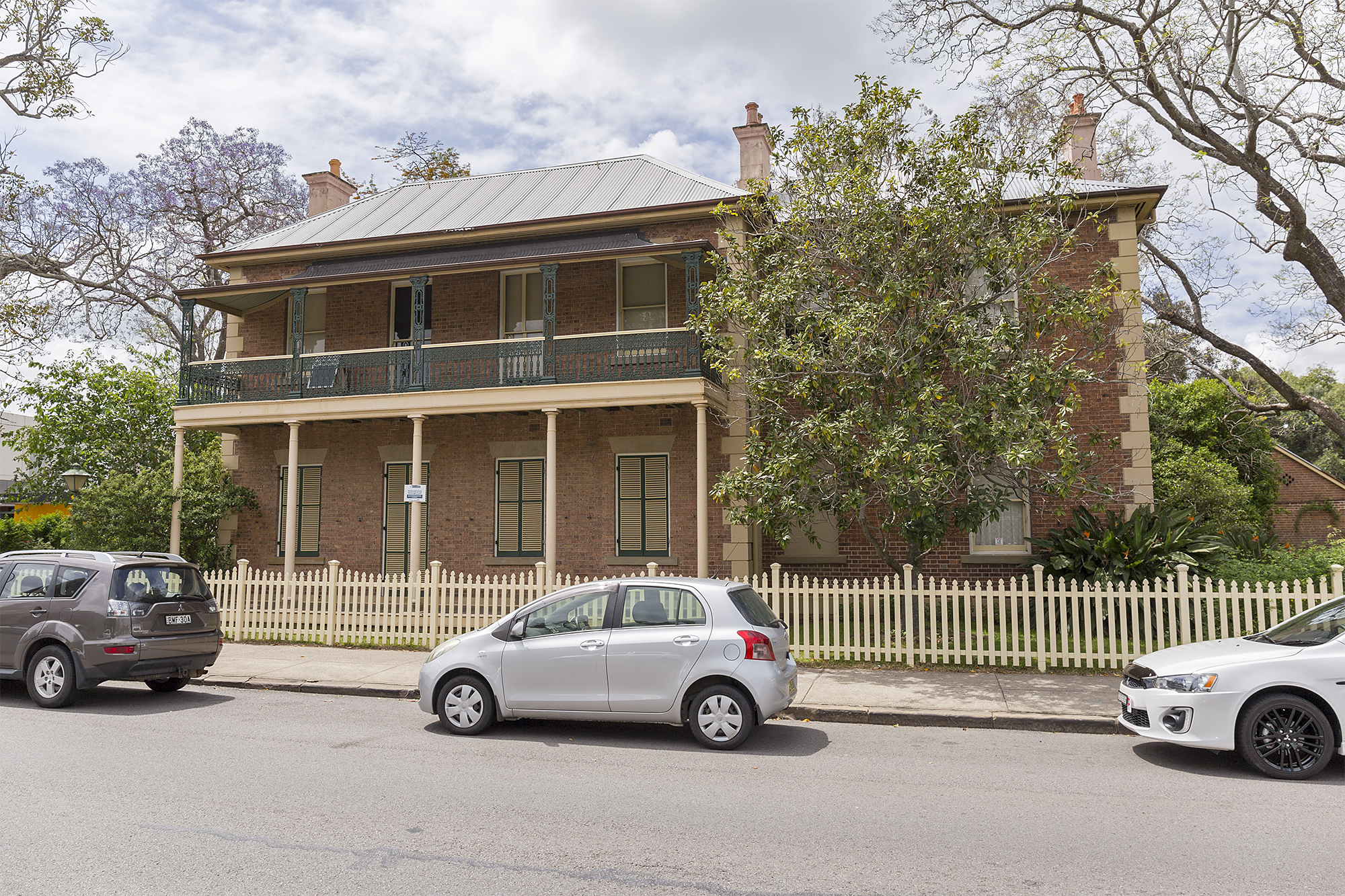
- Brough House on Church Street, 2018

- Location within New South Wales Location within Australia
- 32.7350°S 151.5532°E
- Location: Church Street, Maitland, City of Maitland, New South Wales, Australia

History
- Built: 1860–1862

Site notes
- Owner: National Trust of Australia (NSW)

New South Wales Heritage Register
- Official name: Brough House; Grossman and Brough House Group
- Type: state heritage (built)
- Designated: 1 March 2002
- Reference no.: 1495
- Type: House
- Category: Residential buildings (private)
- Builders: Isaac Beckett, Samuel Owens.

Brough House is a heritage-listed former residence and premises for the Maitland Girls' High School and Maitland Art Gallery and now house museum at Church Street, Maitland, New South Wales, in the state's Hunter Region. It was built from 1860 to 1862 by Isaac Beckett and Samuel Owens. The property is owned by the National Trust of Australia (NSW). It is associated with neighbouring Grossmann House, which is also owned by the National Trust. It was added to the New South Wales State Heritage Register on 1 March 2002.

== History ==
During the nineteenth century, Maitland was an important commercial centre in the Hunter Valley. Its origins as a camp for convict timber loggers led to the realisation of the extremely fertile soil and potential for agricultural prosperity. By the 1840s Maitland was established as the chief town of the region, its population exceeding only that of Sydney. The business industry flourished as Maitland adopted the role of the trade centre, providing services and supplies to rural industries. It was during this successful period that local business partners Samuel Owens and Isaac Beckett built their two homes, Brough House and Grossmann House.

The businessmen formed their partnership in 1838; however the houses were not built until 1860.

In 1838, the Owen and Beckett Partnership established a business as general merchants, tailors, woolbrokers, wine and spirit and tobacco merchants.

In 1860, Grossmann and Brough house were constructed opposite St Mary's the Virgin Anglican Church, near the railway and away from the threat of flood.

The house was occupied by Samuel Owen and his wife Margaret (Eyre) Owen. Following the death of Samuel Owen the house and grounds were sold by auction in 1904 to Mr. J. G. Rigney for £1,630.

In 1919, the Department of Education purchased the house to convert into a school hostel.

In 1972, the Department of Education granted permissive occupancy to the National Trust of Australia (NSW).

In 1974, Maitland City Council agreed to house Maitland Art Gallery and share the upper floor with the Music Conservatorium. The Maitland City Council under the auspices of the National Trust manages Brough House. In 1975, the Maitland Art Gallery opened to the public.

In 1978, the State Government added Grossman House to the Brough House reserve for the preservation of historic sites and buildings and the National Trust of Australia (NSW) were appointed trust managers.

The Maitland Art Gallery (now Maitland Regional Art Gallery) vacated the building and moved to new premises in 2003.

== Description ==
Isaac Beckett and Samuel Owen built Grossmann and Brough House in 1860 to 1862. The strong business partnership between the two merchants, Owen and Beckett, is reflected in the construction of their identical two storey Victorian houses next door to each other.

Local red sandstone bricks are the primary medium and detailing incorporates a harmonious use of buff sandstone and painted cast iron and timber. Large verandahs at the front and rear (west and east) formed an integral part of the design. The hipped roof is covered with corrugated iron.

Internal planning is sensible, providing easy circulation and spacious main rooms. Based on a centre hall plan the front entrances become side doors and the length of the house extends along Church Street, thereby optimising the verandah and views. Original internal joinery is cedar and this, along with other interior finishes (plaster, tiles, timber flooring) are presented with little embellishment.

The gardens were generous in size and, perhaps predictably, given the symmetry of Owen and Beckett's arrangement, the laundry building is situated on the centre line of the properties. This simple, rectilinear structure has a central partition, dividing the area thus providing each resident with semi-private facilities.

Brough House was reported to be in good physical condition as of 30 June 2000 and is largely intact.

=== Modifications and dates ===
- 1920s – addition of a Kitchen and upper floor washrooms were added to Brough House.
- 1965 – shutters were restored to the ground floor and a small flat installed on the first floor for a resident curator.
- 1974 – minor changes were made to Brough House to facilitate an art gallery and enable limited use of two musical rehearsal rooms on the first floor by the Newcastle Conservatorium.
- 1979 – front verandahs have been reinstated after a lengthy absence from both formal facades.
- 1986 – Street-front verandahs to Brough House restored

== Heritage listing ==
A large Victorian town house, which forms an interesting group with its twin (Grossman House) next door now largely, restored in its original form. Built by merchants in partnership, they form an impressive residential partnership of the 1860s. The historical associations of these two buildings make them of great interest in their relationship to the original owners and later use as part of the Maitland Girls' High School.

Brough House was listed on the New South Wales State Heritage Register on 1 March 2002 having satisfied the following criteria.

The place is important in demonstrating the course, or pattern, of cultural or natural history in New South Wales.

Brough House reflects the introduction of public education in New South Wales. Historically the house reflects Maitland's nineteenth century prosperity and significance, especially in its location on the axis between the railway station and High streets. The architectural design of the Victorian Terraces also adds to the historical significance of developing a township.

The place is important in demonstrating aesthetic characteristics and/or a high degree of creative or technical achievement in New South Wales.

Brough House forms an integral part of an historic nineteenth century townscape dominated by St Mary's Church, large fig trees, residences and gardens. Built on Church Street, directly adjacent to the Church of St. Mary, Brough House mirrors its neighbour Grossman House. Built side by side in Victorian style (with Georgian simplicity), these asymmetrical structures are characteristic of the substantial residential buildings of the era. The buildings reflect a prosperous period for Maitland. Therefore, the site makes a significant and attractive contribution to the present streetscape and to the district as a whole.

The place has strong or special association with a particular community or cultural group in New South Wales for social, cultural or spiritual reasons.

Brough House is socially significant for its long association with the public as a schoolhouse, museum and art gallery add to the social recognition and use of the property.

The place has potential to yield information that will contribute to an understanding of the cultural or natural history of New South Wales.

Brough House serves as a museum of early Maitland urban life and relates well to the other nineteenth century buildings nearby.

The place possesses uncommon, rare or endangered aspects of the cultural or natural history of New South Wales.

Brough House is a rare intact Victorian townhouse providing an accurate representation and presentation of the eighteenth century through its furnishings and architecture.

The place is important in demonstrating the principal characteristics of a class of cultural or natural places/environments in New South Wales.

The properties represent the eighteenth-century architecture by providing two intact identical Victorian Townhouses. The furnishings represent the times and the long associations with the Education Department.
