= Grossmann House =

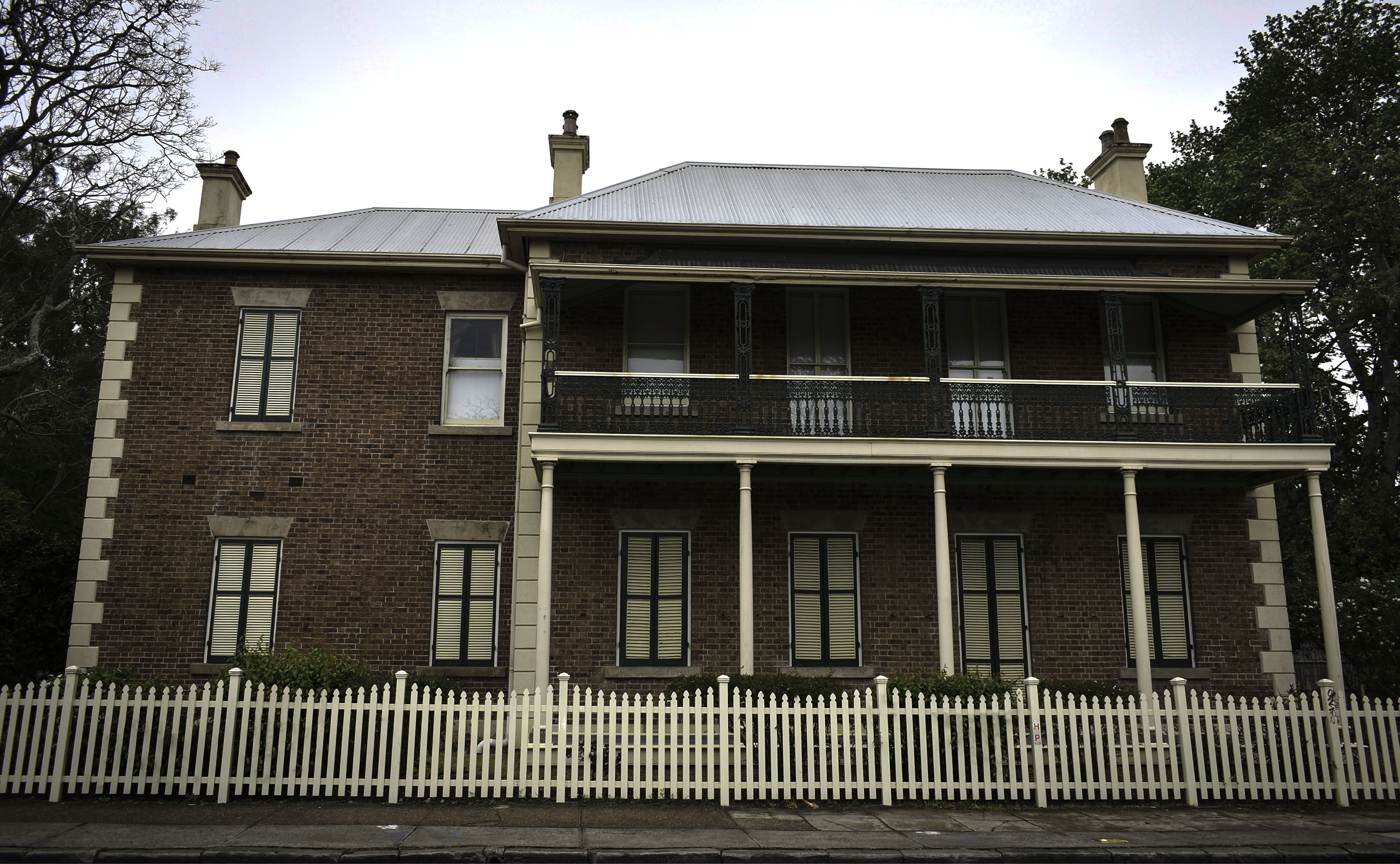
- Grossmann House, 2017

- Location within New South Wales Location within Australia
- 32.7353°S 151.5528°E
- Location: 71 Church Street, Maitland, City of Maitland, New South Wales, Australia

History
- Built: 1860–1862

Site notes
- Owner: National Trust of Australia (NSW)

New South Wales Heritage Register
- Official name: Grossman House; Brough and Grossmann House Group; Maitland Girl’s High School; Grossmann House
- Type: state heritage (built)
- Designated: 1 March 2002
- Reference no.: 1499
- Type: House
- Category: Residential buildings (private)
- Builders: Isaac Beckett and Samuel Owen

Grossmann House is a heritage-listed former residence and Maitland Girls' High School premises and now house museum at 71 Church Street, Maitland, in the Hunter region of New South Wales, Australia. It was built from 1860 to 1862 by Isaac Beckett and Samuel Owen. It is also known as Grossman House. The property is owned by the National Trust of Australia (NSW), and is associated with the neighbouring Brough House, which is also owned by the National Trust. It was added to the New South Wales State Heritage Register on 1 March 2002.

== History ==
During the nineteenth century, Maitland was an important commercial centre in the Hunter Valley. Its origins as a camp for convict timber loggers led to the realisation of the extremely fertile soil and potential for agricultural prosperity. By the 1840s Maitland was established as the chief town of the region, its population exceeding only that of Sydney. The business industry flourished as Maitland adopted the role of the trade centre, providing services and supplies to rural industries.

It was during this successful period that local business partners Samuel Owens and Isaac Beckett built their two homes, Brough House and Grossmann House. The businessmen formed their partnership in 1838, however the houses were not built until 1860.

In 1838 the Owen and Beckett Partnership established a business as general merchants, tailors, woolbrokers, wine and spirit and tobacco merchants.

In 1860 Grossmann and Brough house were constructed opposite St Mary's the Virgin Anglican Church, near the railway and away from the threat of flood.

In 1860 Grossmann House was occupied by the owner Isaac and his wife and daughter, Caroline and Sarah.

After the death of Beckett in 1880 the property was left to his wife and then son, Thomas Cooper Beckett.

In 1890 the property was sold to J. D Prentice. In 1893 both Grossmann and Brough House were purchased by the Department of Public Infrastructure for a Girls' High School, its name being derived from the first headmistress, Jeanette Grossmann. Grossmann was principal at the school from 1890-1913.

In 1963 the house was presented to the Hunter Regional Trust for use as a house museum. The National Trust of Australia (NSW) decorated the interior to present artefacts from the 1860s. The upper floor also provides simple custodian accommodation.

In 1966 the National Trust took control of the property and opened the house for public viewing. The Department of Education owned the property at the time, and the National Trust secured a permissive occupancy agreement.

The rose garden at Grossmann House was planned and planted in 1973 by members of the Hunter Valley Rose Society. The garden remains largely unaltered since it was established. The idea was not to replicate roses entirely from the 1870s when Grossmann House was (newly) built, but rather to select heritage species (cultivars) which would give recurrent flowering over a long period. Different families of roses were selected, including species from China which are better suited to Australian conditions than are European varieties. The roses were selected from Ross Roses Nursery in South Australia.

In 1978 the State Government added Grossmann House to the Brough House reserve for the preservation of historic sites and buildings and the National Trust of Australia (NSW) were appointed trust managers.

In 1986, the street-front verandahs to the house were restored and basic kitchen and bathroom facilities were introduced to serve a caretaker.

A stone memorial was placed in the rose garden to commemorate Drs. John and Wilga Abrahams by their family in 2000.

2014 saw visitation increase by 34% with fundraising days, local house "open days", a candlelight soiree, sales of home produce and walking tours. A NSW Government grant enabled painting of the exteriors of Brough and Grossmann Houses in matching colours, another step towards linking the mirror-image properties as conceived over 140 years ago.

== Description ==
House

Isaac Beckett and Samuel Owen built Grossmann and the neighbouring Brough House in 1860 to 1862. The strong business partnership between the two merchants, Owen and Beckett, is reflected in the construction of their identical two storey Victorian houses next door to each other.

Local red sandstone bricks are the primary medium and detailing incorporates a harmonious use of buff sandstone and painted cast iron and timber. Large verandahs at the front and rear (west and east) formed an integral part of the design. The hipped roof is covered with corrugated iron.

Internal planning is sensible, providing easy circulation and spacious main rooms. Based on a centre hall plan the front entrances become side doors and the length of the house extends along Church Street, thereby optimising the verandah and views. Original internal joinery is cedar and this, along with other interior finishes (plaster, tiles, timber flooring) are presented with little embellishment.

The gardens were generous in size and, perhaps predictably, given the symmetry of Owen and Beckett's arrangement, the laundry building is situated on the centre line of the properties. This simple, rectilinear structure has a central partition, dividing the area thus providing each resident with semi-private facilities.

=== Garden ===
The rose garden was planned and planted in 1973. The garden remains largely unaltered since it was established. The idea was not to replicate roses entirely from the 1870s when Grossmann House was (newly) built, but rather to select heritage species (cultivars) which would give recurrent flowering over a long period. Different families of roses were selected, including species from China which are better suited to Australian conditions than are European varieties. The roses were selected from Ross Roses Nursery in South Australia (Todd, 2014, 180.

A map made in 1976 of the 1973 rose garden plantings was used in 2003 as the basis of an updated inventory of the roses. Over 60% of the original plantings had survived over 30 years. Today there are 33 varieties of which 27 date from the 1973 plantings. Some of the species were developed around the time Grossmann House was (newly) built, 1870-71. "Zepherine Drouhin" (1868) is a climbing pink rose that is thornless and good for training over archways, "Paul Neyron" (1869) is nicknamed "the cabbage rose" and "Louise Odier", highly fragrant, is said to be used in the French perfume "Joy". "Aimee Vibert" (1828), another of the climbers planted in 1973, was one of the first roses in the colony, brought in originally for the Macarthurs' garden. In 2013 the Hunter Valley Rose Society offered to help look after the Grossmann House rose garden. More new species have been added.

=== Condition ===
The physical condition of the property was reported as good as at 30 June 2000.

Grossman House is largely intact.

== Heritage listing ==
A large Victorian town house, which forms an interesting group with its twin (Brough House) next door now largely, restored in its original form. Built by merchants in partnership, they form an impressive residential partnership of the 1860s. The historical associations of these two buildings make them of great interest in their relationship to the original owners and later use as part of the Maitland Girls' High School.

Grossman House was listed on the New South Wales State Heritage Register on 1 March 2002 having satisfied the following criteria.

The place is important in demonstrating the course, or pattern, of cultural or natural history in New South Wales.

Grossmann House reflects the introduction of public education in New South Wales. Historically the house reflect Maitland's nineteenth century prosperity and significance, especially in its location on the axis between the railway station and High streets. The architectural design of the Victorian Terraces also adds to the historical significance of developing a township.

The place is important in demonstrating aesthetic characteristics and/or a high degree of creative or technical achievement in New South Wales.

Grossmann House forms an integral part of an historic nineteenth century townscape dominated by St Mary's Church, large fig trees, residences and gardens. Built on Church Street, directly adjacent to the Church of St. Mary, Grossman House mirrors its neighbour Brough House. Built side by side in Victorian style (with Georgian simplicity), these asymmetrical structures are characteristic of the substantial residential buildings of the era. The buildings reflect a prosperous period for Maitland. Therefore, the site makes a significant and attractive contribution to the present streetscape and to the district as a whole.

The place has a strong or special association with a particular community or cultural group in New South Wales for social, cultural or spiritual reasons.

Grossman House is socially significant for its long association with the public as a schoolhouse, museum and art gallery add to the social recognition and use of the property.

The place has potential to yield information that will contribute to an understanding of the cultural or natural history of New South Wales.

Grossman House serves as a museum of early Maitland urban life and relates well to the other nineteenth century buildings nearby.

The place possesses uncommon, rare or endangered aspects of the cultural or natural history of New South Wales.

Grossmann House is a rare intact Victorian townhouse providing an accurate representation and presentation of the eighteenth century through its furnishings and architecture.

The place is important in demonstrating the principal characteristics of a class of cultural or natural places/environments in New South Wales.

The properties represent the eighteenth century architecture by providing two intact identical Victorian Townhouses. The furnishings represent the times and the long associations with the Education Department.
