= Maitland Court House =

Heritage building in New South Wales, Australia

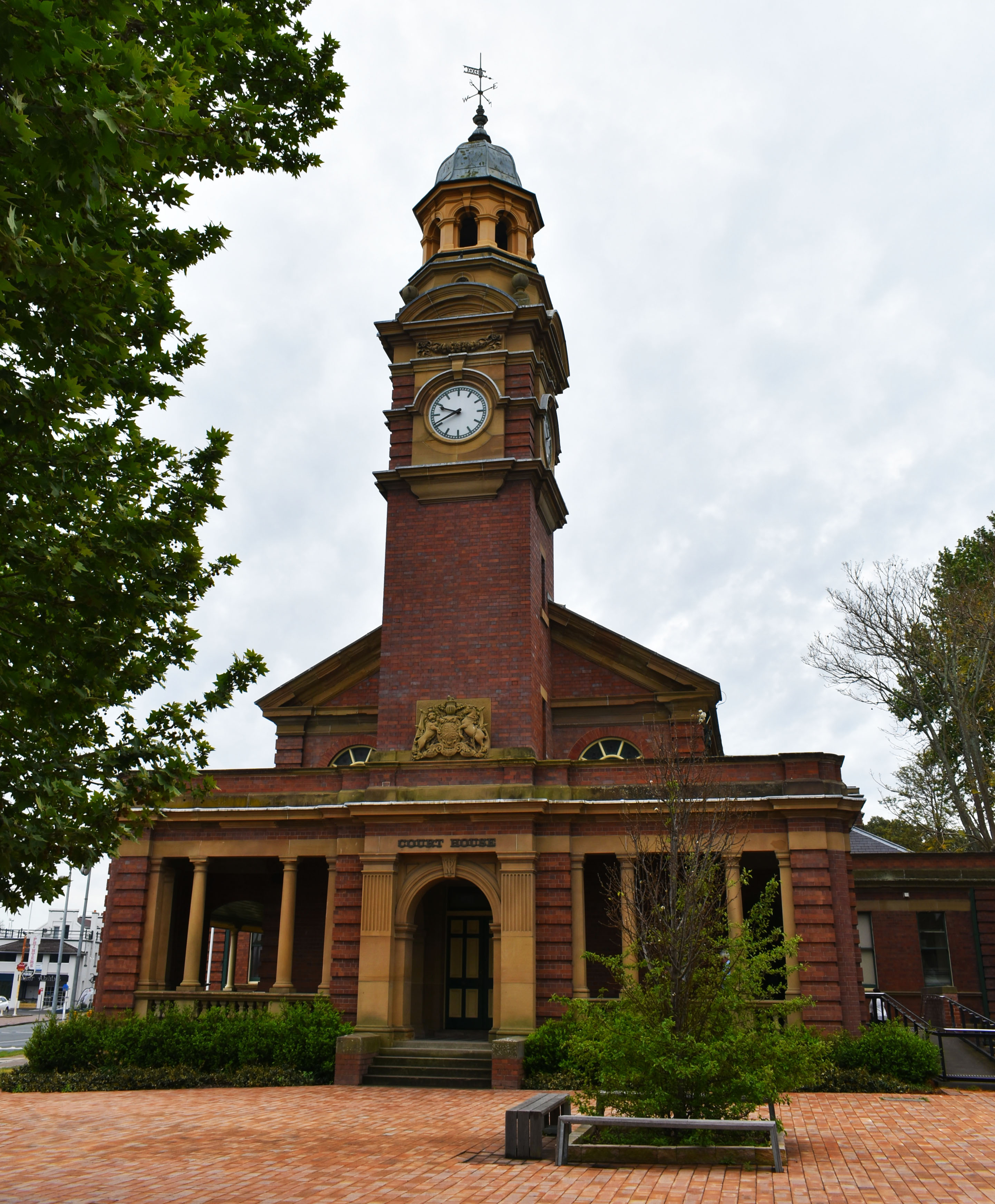
- Maitland Court House, 2017

- Location within New South Wales Location within Australia
- 32.7294°S 151.5525°E
- Location: High Street, Maitland, City of Maitland, New South Wales, Australia

History
- Built: 1895–

Site notes
- Architect: Walter Liberty Vernon
- Owner: Attorney General's Department

New South Wales Heritage Register
- Official name: Maitland Court House; Maitland Courthouse
- Type: state heritage (built)
- Designated: 2 April 1999
- Reference no.: 794
- Type: Courthouse
- Category: Law Enforcement

Maitland Court House is a heritage-listed courthouse at High Street, Maitland, City of Maitland, New South Wales, Australia. It was designed by Walter Liberty Vernon and built in 1895–96. The property is owned by the Department of Justice. It was added to the New South Wales State Heritage Register on 2 April 1999.

== History ==
The Maitland Court House was built in 1895–96 to the designs of Government Architect Walter Liberty Vernon at a cost of £11,700. The contractors were William Taylor and Sons of Maitland, and the stone used in construction came from the Ravenswood quarry. It was formally opened on 19 December 1896. It was designed as a joint courthouse and police station. The new courthouse – often referred to as West Maitland – continued in joint operation with the pre-existing courthouse at East Maitland. The site had originally been set aside ten years prior to construction, but the project had faced numerous delays.

The building ceased to be used as a police station in 1986, and the police area remained vacant at the time of the building's heritage listing. The Local Court of New South Wales continues to sit in the courthouse.

The courthouse underwent a $1.1 million restoration in 2013–14, including repairs to the clock tower, replacement of the roof with slate tiles, new floors and new seating. It closed from November 2013 to February 2014 to accommodate the works. It had previously undergone a $50,000 security upgrade in 2010; prior to this, the building had been described as "effectively [having] had no security".

== Description ==
The Maitland Court House is an outstanding building designed during the transition of Victorian and Federation periods. It is Federation Free Classical in style and detailing, using typical Federation materials such as face red brick with contrasting sandstone trim. The building complex is prominently located in the main business street. The clock tower mounted on the Court House roof is a land mark within the district. The Court Room is accessed through a formal colonnaded portico. Classical detailing in Ravensfield sandstone decorates the building. The hipped and gabled roofs are clad in slate tiles.

Other accommodation includes a general office, waiting room, prisoner access to court room, toilets, and community legal centre office,

It was reported to be in good condition as at 30 October 2000.

== Heritage listing ==
The Maitland Court House is an outstanding and grandly designed Federation Free Classical building. The building is located prominently within the business precinct of Maitland where the clock tower mounted on the Court Room is a local landmark. This building is of significance to the state. The building has a lengthy association with the provision of justice in the district.

Maitland Court House was listed on the New South Wales State Heritage Register on 2 April 1999.
