= Maitland Regional Art Gallery =

Art museum in New South Wales, Australia

Coordinates: 32°44′14.8″S 151°33′41.8″E

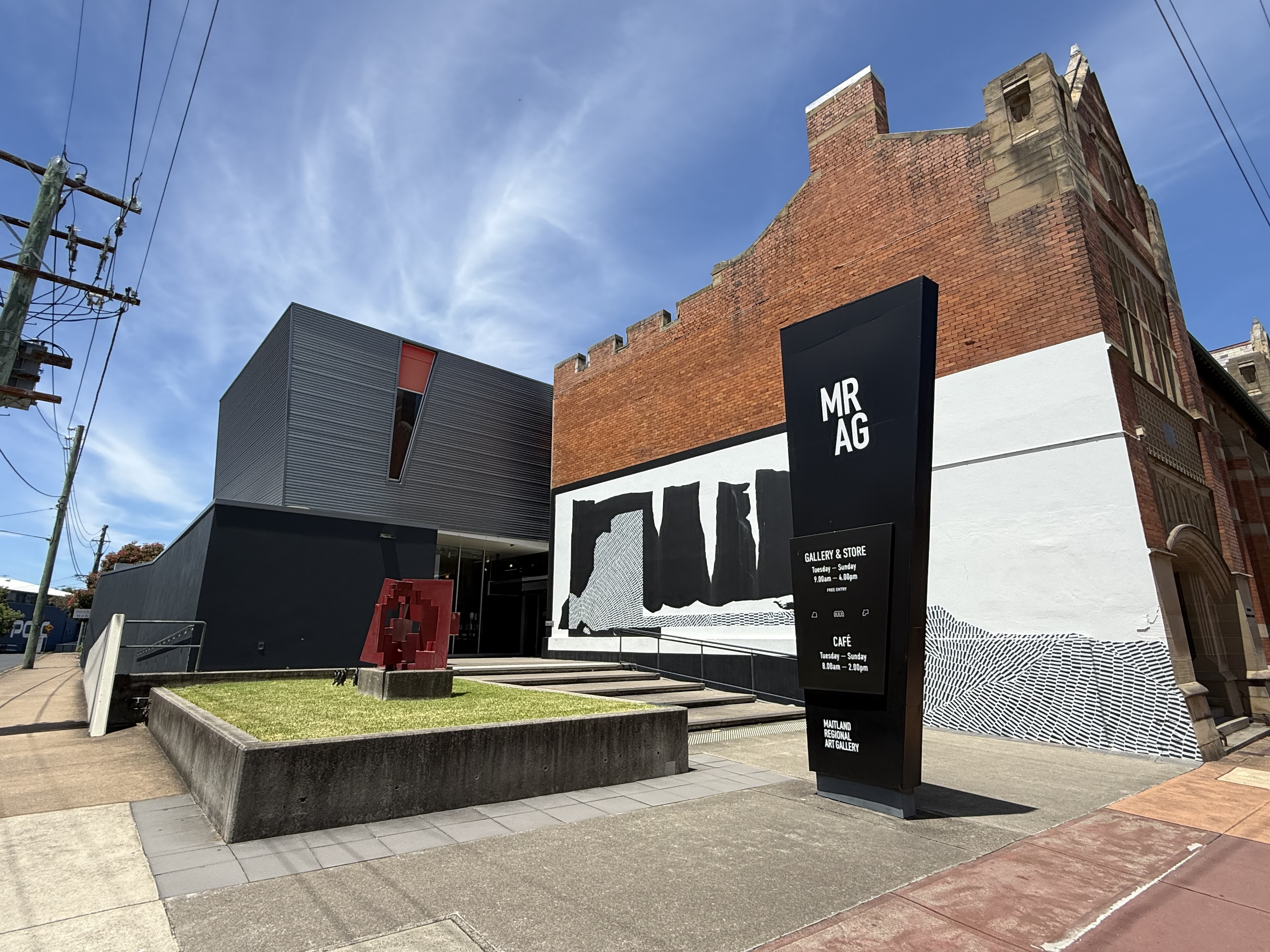
Maitland Regional Art Gallery (MRAG), December 2025

Maitland Regional Art Gallery or MRAG is a public art museum in Maitland, New South Wales, Australia.

== History ==
Maitland City Council began purchasing works of art in 1957 which formed the basis of the collection as it is today. In 1975 Brough House, in Church Street Maitland became the first Maitland City Art Gallery site. MRAG opened at its current site on High Street Maitland in November 2003. The Federation gothic building once housed the Maitland Technical College opened in 1910. In 2008 the gallery closed for redevelopment and was reopened on the 15 August 2009 by the artist Margaret Olley.

== Collection ==
MRAG's collection comprises over 6000 items, encompassing design, art and artefacts, focusing largely on works on paper. The collection holds work by several acclaimed Australian artists such as, John Coburn, William Dobell, Margaret Olley, George Baldessin, Charles Blackman, Brett Whiteley and Tim Leura Tjapaltjarri, Sidney Nolan, Tim Storrier, James Gleeson, Martin Sharp, Salvatore Zofrea, John Olsen, Euan Macleod, Suzanne Archer, Alan Jones, Ken Whisson, Adrian Lockhardt, Judy Watson, Gloria Petyarre and Lloyd Rees.
