= Department of Mineral Resources Historic Photographs Collection =

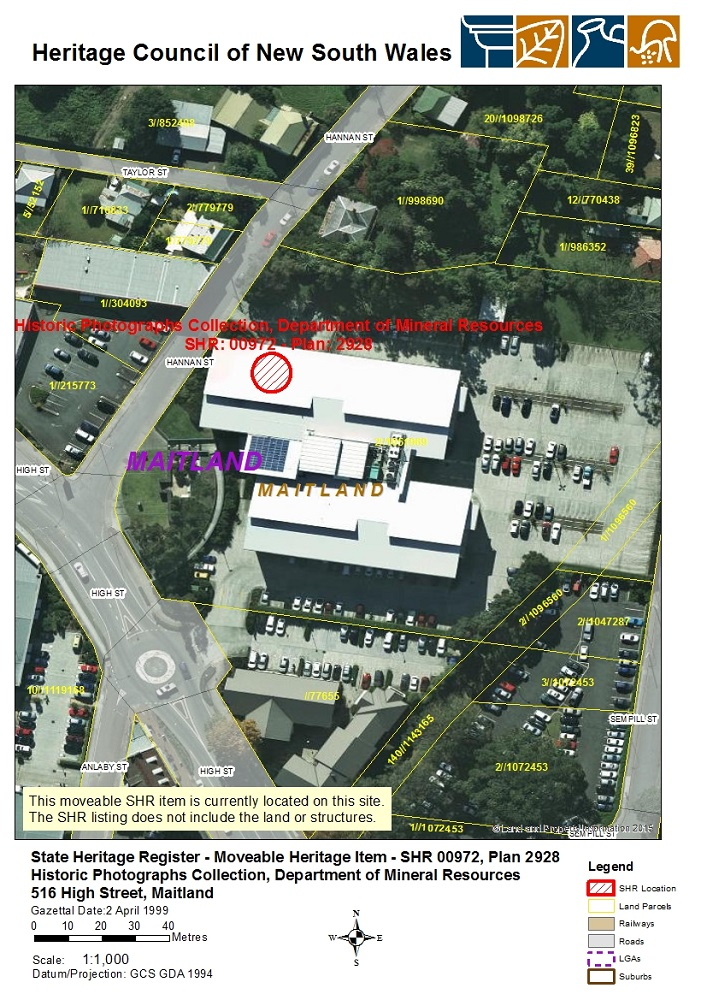
- Heritage boundaries

- Location within New South Wales Location within Australia
- 32.7277°S 151.5520°E
- Location: 516 High Street, Maitland, City of Maitland, New South Wales, Australia

History
- Built: 1860–

New South Wales Heritage Register
- Official name: Historic Photographs Collection, Department of Mineral Resources; Geological Survey collection of historic images; NSW Trade & Investment offices Maitland
- Type: state heritage (movable / collection)
- Designated: 2 April 1999
- Reference no.: 972
- Type: Contents (movable)
- Category: Government and Administration

The Department of Mineral Resources Historic Photographs Collection is a heritage-listed Australian photographic collection. It is maintained by the New South Wales Resources Regulator, located at 516 High Street, Maitland in the state's Hunter region. It was established from 1860. It is also known as the Geological Survey collection of historic images. It was added to the New South Wales State Heritage Register on 2 April 1999.

== Description ==
Contains original glass plates, glass lantern slides and copy negatives covering mining and related subjects dating from 1860 to the present. There is in the order of 110,00 photographs in the collection.

As at 16 March 2001, the photographs were mounted on cards with negatives stored.

Additions to the photographic collection are made on a regular basis.

Public viewing of the collection is available through appointment.

== Heritage listing ==
The collection of historic images of rocks and landforms includes rare images relating to early mineral discoveries and provides insight into the development of the mining industry in New South Wales.

The collection of around 110,000 historic images, amassed since the late nineteenth century by the NSW Government's "Geological Survey" branch of the former department of Mineral Resources, were required for the production of geological maps of the state.

The collection is associated with George W. Card, curator of the Geological Mining Museum, who was the first to order it and with the office of the Government Printer, whose photographers took most of the photographs. There is an associated collection of photographs in the Government Printing Office's collection of glass negatives in the State Library of New South Wales.

The collection includes valuable historic images of the landscape from Victoria. Queensland, Tasmania as well as some countries overseas. It is estimated that less than one tenth of the collection has been scanned. There is some meta-data associated with the collection including index cards. The maps which were constructed on the basis of these photos are not part of the collection but are held by the former department of Mineral Resources.

About 6000 images from the collection - largely historic photographs - are held by State Records. The rest of the collection of negatives, glass plate negatives and slides was moved from St Leonards to the offices of NSW Trade & Investment in Maitland in 2004.

The Department of Mineral Resources Historic Photographs Collection was listed on the New South Wales State Heritage Register on 2 April 1999.
