= Barden and Ribee Saddlery =

Barden & Ribee Saddlery
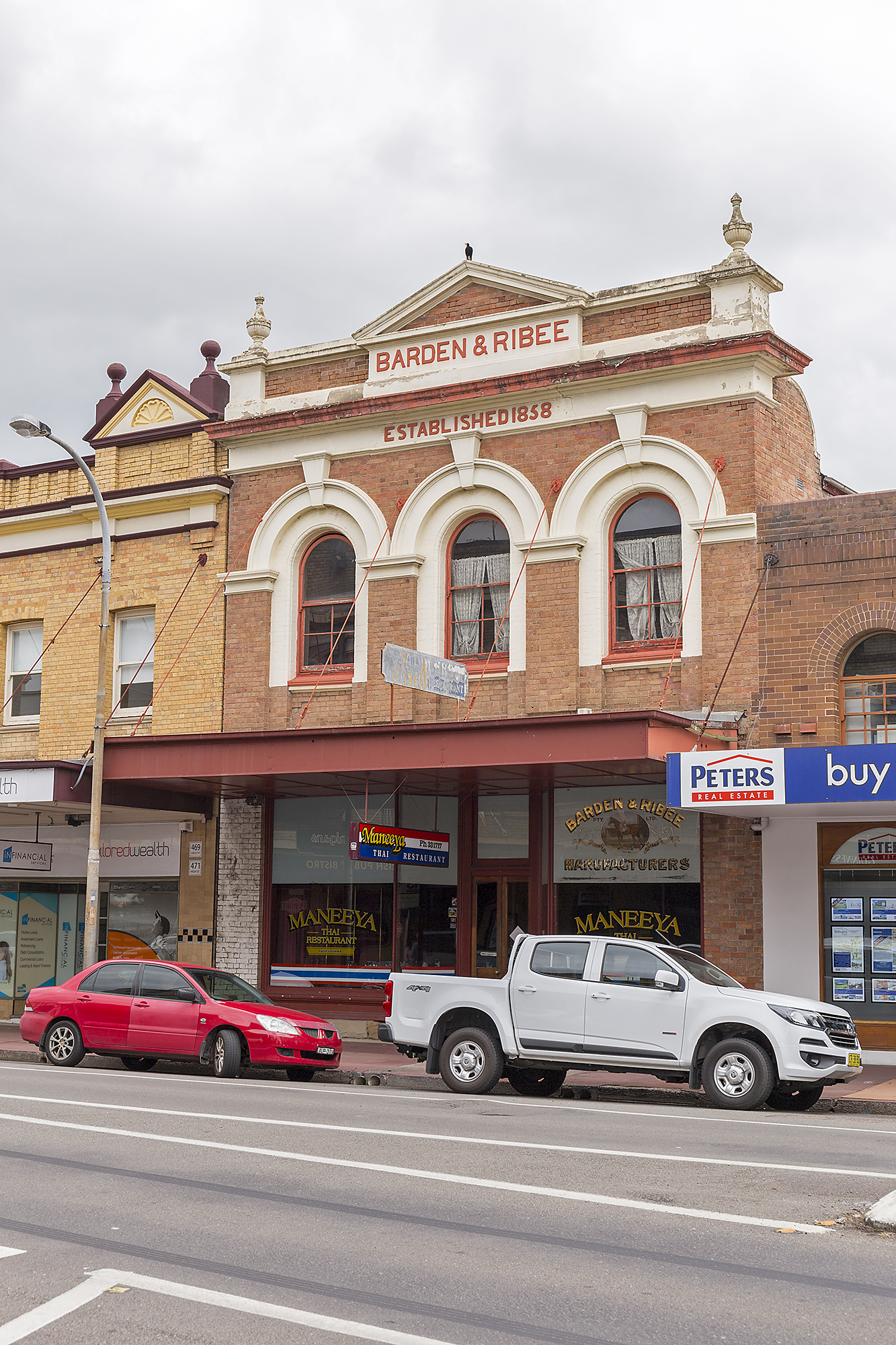

- Location within New South Wales Location within Australia
- 32.7314°S 151.5531°E
- Location: 473 High Street, Maitland, City of Maitland, New South Wales, Australia

Site notes
- Architect: John W. Pender

New South Wales Heritage Register
- Official name: Barden & Ribee Saddlery
- Type: state heritage (built)
- Designated: 2 April 1999
- Reference no.: 89
- Type: Blacksmithy
- Category: Manufacturing and Processing
- Builders: Robert James

Barden and Ribee Saddlery is a heritage-listed former saddlery at 473 High Street, Maitland, in the Hunter region of New South Wales, Australia. It was added to the New South Wales State Heritage Register on 2 April 1999.

== History ==
Barden & Ribee Pty Ltd was a successful Maitland saddlery business, which had been established in 1872 as a partnership between Thomas J. Ribee and J. W. Barden. The building was built in 1888 as new premises for the company, which required larger premises due to increased business. It was designed by John W. Pender and built by Robert James. The ground floor was used as retail premises, while the second-floor was a storeroom, with a workroom also on-site.

The business remained in their families after the death of the initial partners.

The business closed c. 1970s and sold the premises in 1978.

It has been converted to a restaurant, but retains evidence of its former use as a saddlery.

== Description ==
It is a two-storey brick commercial building in the Victorian Free Classical style. It retains the original signage on the building's second-floor exterior and above a ground-floor window.

The City of Maitland describes it as "an excellent example of Victorian commercial premises" and states that it is an "important record of the pattern of commercial development and of a saddlery as interpretation of reliance on horses for local transport in the nineteenth century".

== Heritage listing ==
Barden & Ribee Saddlery was listed on the New South Wales State Heritage Register on 2 April 1999.
