= Maitland Post Office =

Historic commonwealth heritage site in Maitland NSW

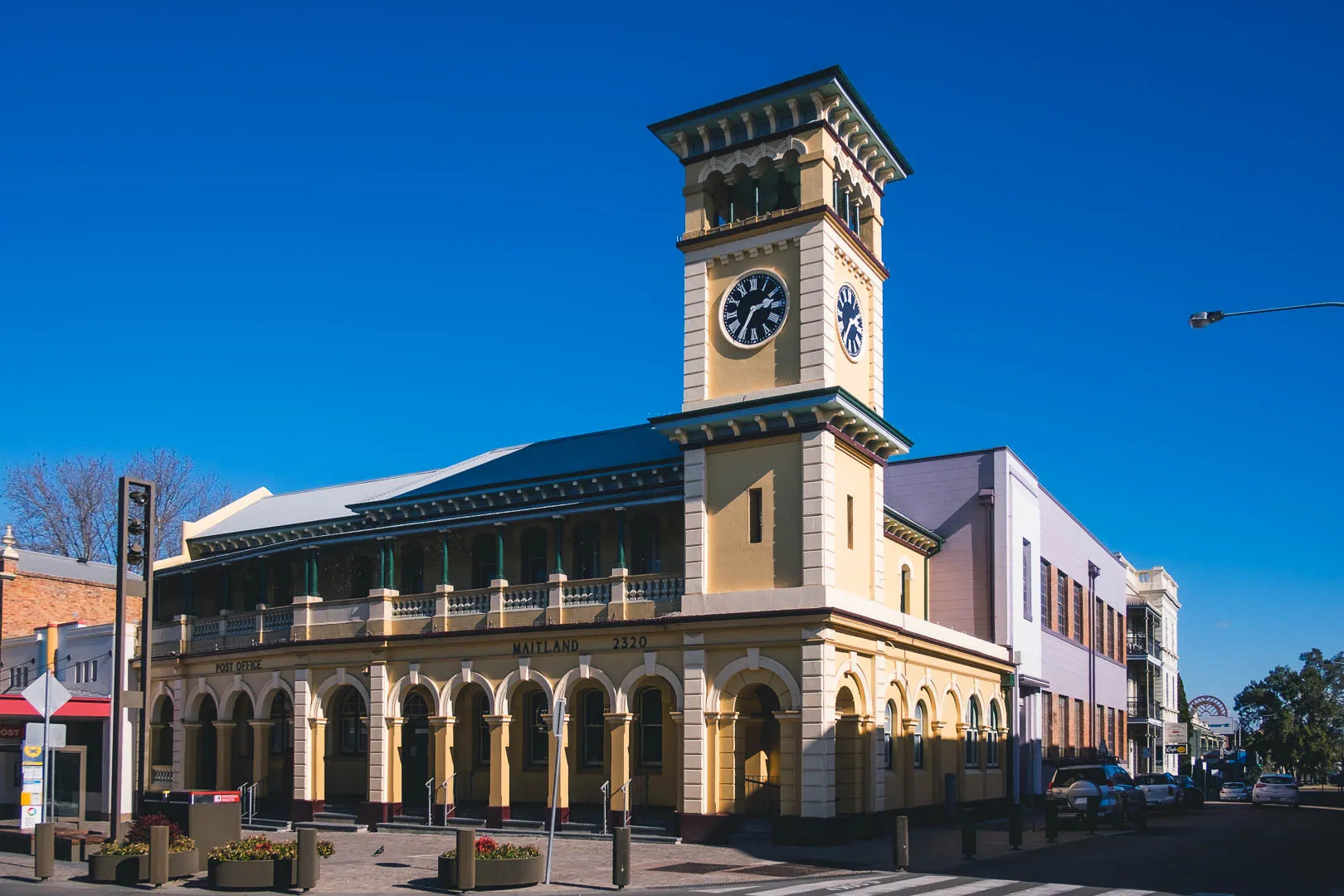

- Location within New South Wales Location within Australia
- 32.7337°S 151.5572°E
- Location: 381 High Street, Maitland, City of Maitland, New South Wales, Australia

History
- Built: 1881–

Site notes
- Architect: NSW Colonial Architect's Office under James Barnet
- Owner: Australia Post

New South Wales Heritage Register
- Official name: Maitland Post Office
- Type: state heritage (built)
- Designated: 17 December 1999
- Reference no.: 1313
- Type: Post Office
- Category: Postal and Telecommunications

Maitland Post Office is a heritage-listed post office at 381 High Street, Maitland, City of Maitland, New South Wales, Australia. It was designed by the NSW Colonial Architect's Office under James Barnet and built in 1881. The property is owned by Australia Post. It was added to the New South Wales State Heritage Register on 17 December 1999.

== History ==
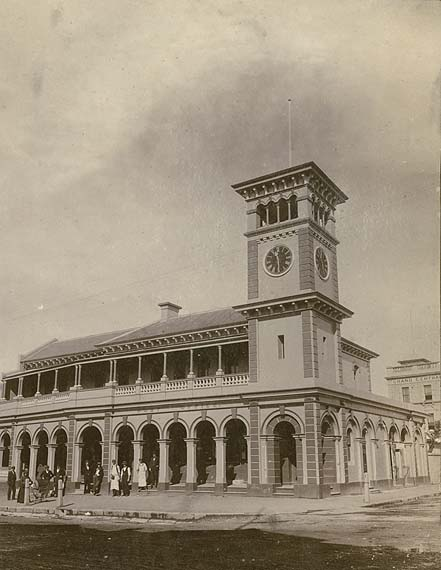
The Maitland Post Office in the early 20th century

The settlement began in 1818–1821 with some convicts put to work "cedar getting". Originally known as "The Camp", then as 'Molly Morgan's Plains' and "Wallis" Plains' after the commandant at Newcastle. Maitland is a coal-mining and regional centre, subject to severe flood damage, which was the cause of the East Maitland Post Office being vacated for a new post office on higher ground.

The current post office building was designed by the Colonial Architect's Office under James Barnet and completed in 1881, replacing the original Post and Telegraph Office which was situated on the opposite corner of Bourke Street. An addition to the building was added in 1900.

== Description ==
A two-storey, stuccoed brick Victorian Italianate post office with a corner clock tower/campanile, and a corrugated iron clad roof. The building is located in a visually prominent position, near a major intersection. The main facade to High Street has a round arched loggia at street level surmounted by a balcony with cast iron column supports. Openings to the windows and doors have heavily moulded arched lintels and quoins are expressed by grooved mock ashlar jointing. The facade is bisected horizontally by a deeply moulded stringcourse and a bracketed cornice carries the projecting eave. The treatment of the return elevation is less imposing. A two-storey, twentieth-century addition on the south side is not included in the heritage-listing.

The physical condition of the building was reported as good as at 23 November 1999. The integrity was fair, with the former main entrance replaced by a window and interior alterations.

== Heritage listing ==
As a substantial public building the Maitland Post Office is an exemplar of the Victorian Italianate style, incorporating a corner tower of considerable land mark value. The building is associated with Colonial Architect James Barnet and is representative of the group of Italianate post offices designed by Barnet. It is substantially intact and of importance in these respects at the State level.

Maitland Post Office was listed on the New South Wales State Heritage Register on 17 December 1999 having satisfied the following criteria.

The place is important in demonstrating the course, or pattern, of cultural or natural history in New South Wales.

The Maitland Post Office is highly representative of its period and is associated with the NSW Colonial Architect's Office under James Barnet. It is part of an important group of works by James Barnet, a key practitioner of the Italianate style.

The place is important in demonstrating aesthetic characteristics and/or a high degree of creative or technical achievement in New South Wales.

The building is an exemplar of the Victorian Italianate style, incorporating the characteristic corner tower and loggia. It is part of a group of post office buildings (including Kempsey, 1886 (Kempsey Post Office), Kiama, 1878, Cootamundra, 1880–1881, Redfern, 1882 and Yass, 1884 (Yass Post Office)) designed in the Italianate style and collectively illustrating a representative type.

The tower and asymmetrical facade impart considerable architectural presence to the narrow street and give the building landmark qualities.

The place has a strong or special association with a particular community or cultural group in New South Wales for social, cultural or spiritual reasons.

As a prominent and attractive civic building, the Maitland Post Office is considered to be significant to the community's sense of place.

The place has potential to yield information that will contribute to an understanding of the cultural or natural history of New South Wales.

The site has the potential to contain an archaeological resource, which may provide information relating to the previous use of the site, and to use by the post office.

The place is important in demonstrating the principal characteristics of a class of cultural or natural places/environments in New South Wales.

The Maitland Post Office is representative of the body of work of Government Architect James Barnet. It is also representative of the Victorian Italianate style and more specifically the group of Italianate post offices designed by the Government Archite
