= Maitland, New South Wales =

Maitland
- City
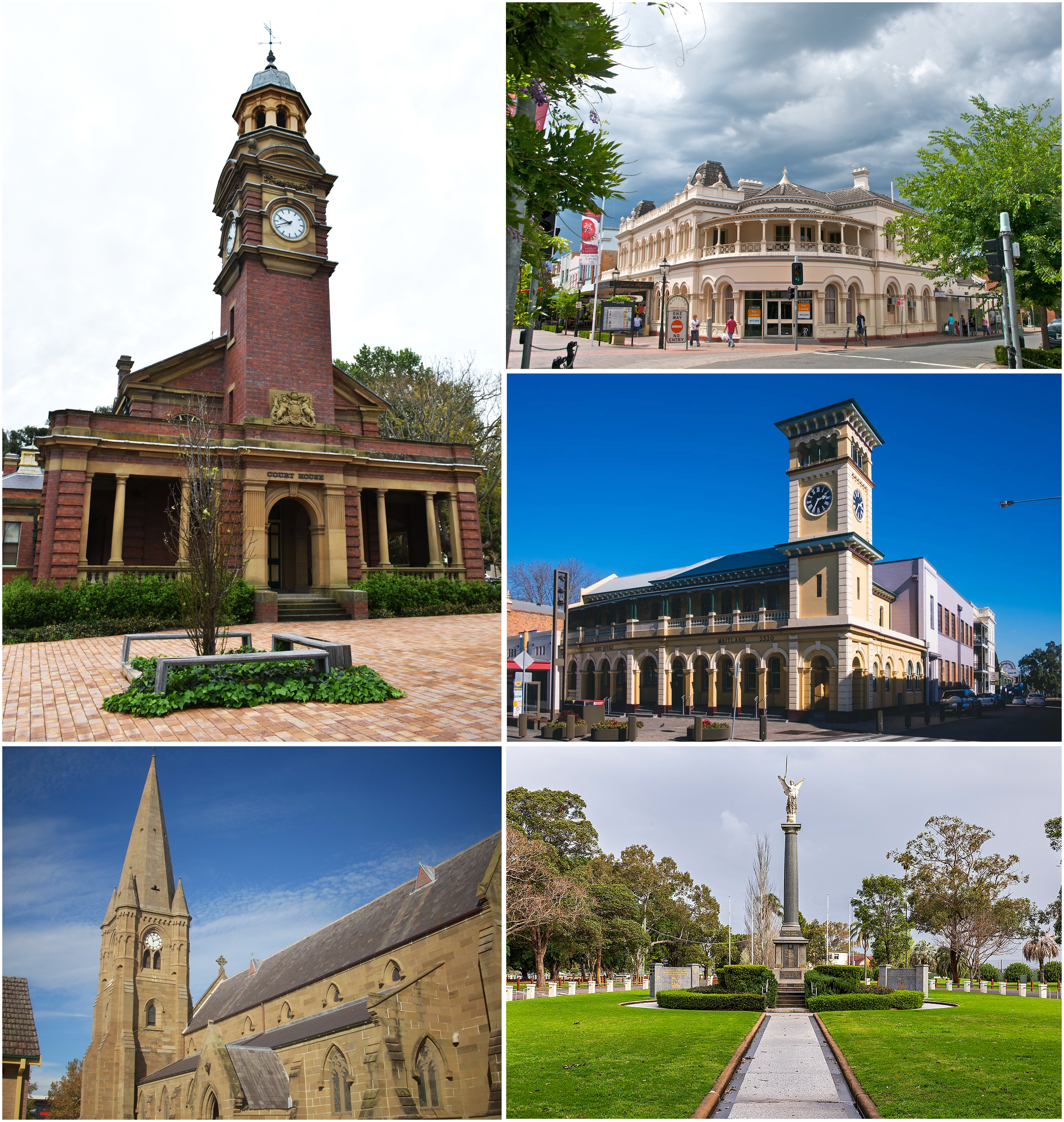
- From top, left to right: Maitland Court House, The Levee, Maitland Post Office, St Mary's the Virgin Anglican Church, Citizens Memorial at Maitland Park

- Coordinates: 32°43′S 151°33′E
- Country: Australia
- State: New South Wales
- Region: Hunter
- LGA: Maitland City Council
- Location: 166 km (103 mi) N of Sydney; 35 km (22 mi) NW of Newcastle; 27 km (17 mi) ENE of Cessnock; 49 km (30 mi) ESE of Singleton
- Established: 1820

Government
  - State electorate: Maitland
  - Federal division: Paterson

Area
  - Total: 392 km^{2} (151 sq mi)
- Elevation: 3 m (9.8 ft)

Population
  - Total: 89,597 (2021 census)
  - Density: 230/km^{2} (600/sq mi)
- Time zone: UTC+10 (AEST)
  - Summer (DST): UTC+11 (AEDT)
- Postcode: 2320
- County: Northumberland
- Parish: Maitland
- Mean max temp: 24.5 °C (76.1 °F)
- Mean min temp: 11.8 °C (53.2 °F)
- Annual rainfall: 821.3 mm (32.33 in)

Maitland (/ˈmeɪtlənd/ MAYT-lənd) is a city in the Hunter Valley of New South Wales, Australia and the seat of Maitland City Council, situated on the Hunter River approximately 166 kilometres (103 mi) by road north of Sydney and 35 km (22 mi) north-west of Newcastle. It is on the New England Highway approximately 17 km (11 mi) from its origin at Hexham.

At the 2021 census it had approximately 89,597 inhabitants, spread over an area of 392 square kilometres (151 sq mi), with most of the population located in a strip along the New England Highway between the suburbs of Lochinvar and Thornton. The city centre is located on the right bank of the Hunter River, protected from moderate potential flooding by a levee.

Surrounding areas include the cities of Cessnock and Singleton local government areas.

== History ==
The Awabakal and the Wonnarua people were the first known people of this land. The Awabakal called the area where Maitland is now situated by the name Bo-un after a species of bird.

From around 1816, cedar logging parties from the convict settlement of Newcastle were the first Europeans to stay on the site. Governor Lachlan Macquarie visited the area in 1818, naming it Wallis Plains after Captain James Wallis who was commandant of the Newcastle penal colony at the time. In 1819, convict farmers were allowed to select land at Wallis Plains, the most notable of which was Molly Morgan.

Tom White Melville Winder was one of the largest proprietors on the Hunter. Winder held 7400 acres (2995 ha) by 1828 and by 1831 had acquired another 2600 acres (1052 ha). The oldest house (commenced 1821) in the greater Maitland LGA was called "Windermere" and also referred to the adjacent farmlands which were for agriculture and later a "boiling-down works". Windermere estate was established before East Maitland and West Maitland were established as suburbs and so is of historical significance.

By 1821 the first British government buildings, consisting of a cottage and barracks, were constructed, and in 1823 James Mudie financed the construction of a wharf. Two years later William Powditch opened the first general store at Wallis Plains.

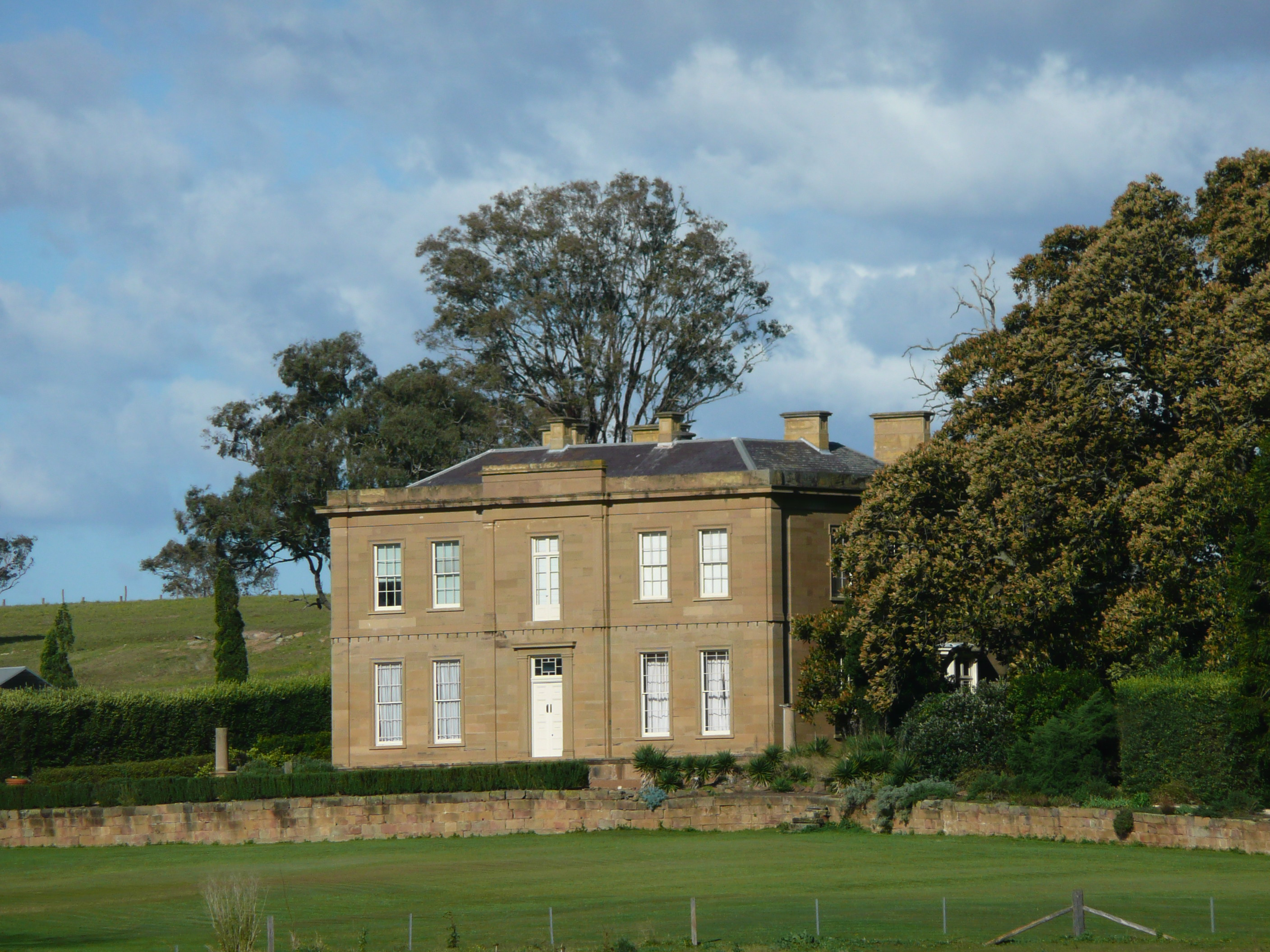
Aberglasslyn House; one of the earliest surviving residences in the Maitland region

In 1829, assistant surveyor George Boyle White, officially laid out a township on the site of Wallis Plains. The village was called Maitland possibly in honour of Frederick Lewis Maitland. Due to population growth, Maitland was partitioned in 1835 into West Maitland (which was the original Wallis Plains settlement) and East Maitland. The nearby town of Morpeth developed at the same time from the Green Hills land grant given to Lieutenant Edward Charles Close, a Peninsular War veteran. Morpeth served as the head of navigation for larger ships (later, steamships), and goods were transhipped upriver to West Maitland on barges and smaller vessels. Originally the river route between Morpeth and West Maitland was 26 kilometres (16 mi), today after various floods and river course changes this has reduced to just 9 kilometres (5.6 mi).

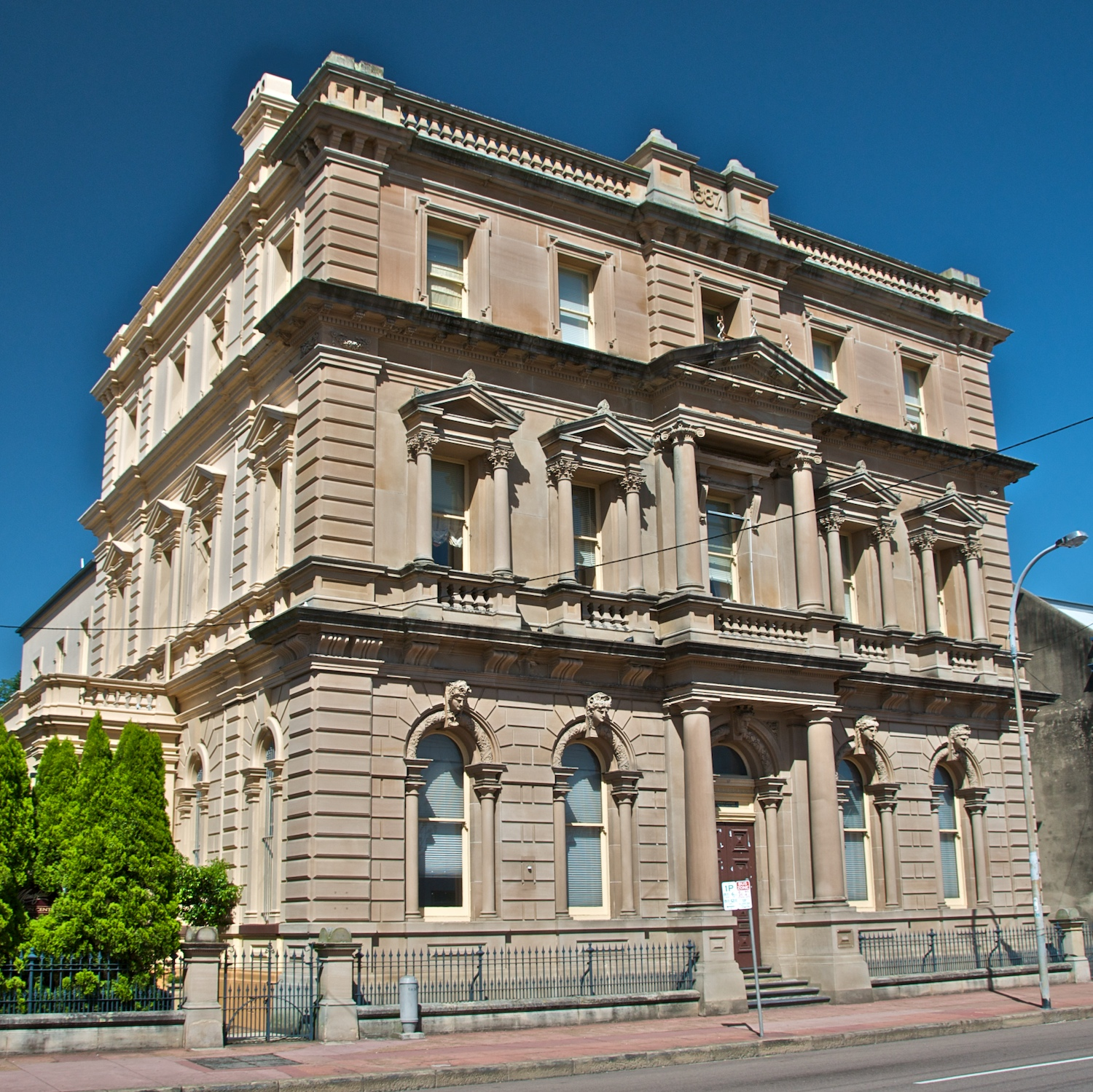
The former Commercial Banking Company of Sydney building, completed in 1887

West Maitland was therefore the point at which goods were unloaded for, and distributed to, the prosperous riverland of the Hunter Valley. Accordingly, there were large warehouses (some of which still exist) built, which faced onto the main High Street and backed onto the Hunter River. One famous business being E.P Capper & Sons founded in 1841. The Cappers "prospered mightily, branching out into property and financing but the large store in High Street was the foundation of their empire. Built in 1888, it consisted of four stories in the front and three in the rear" it even included a lift. This impressive building was destroyed by fire in 1971.

The arrival of the railway from Newcastle in the 1850s, coupled with the increasing silting of the river and larger ships spelt the end of the traditional river traffic.

The municipalities of West and East Maitland were merged in 1944 and the name of West Maitland was officially reverted to Maitland in 1949, from which the present city is now known. The city's boundaries have been increased by incorporating parts of other local government areas since then (most notably Kearsley Shire which from 1946 to 1949 was the only local government area in Australia's history to have a Communist majority of councillors).

The first electricity connected in the area was to Maitland Town Hall in 1922, to the hall's front light.

=== Belmore Bridge ===
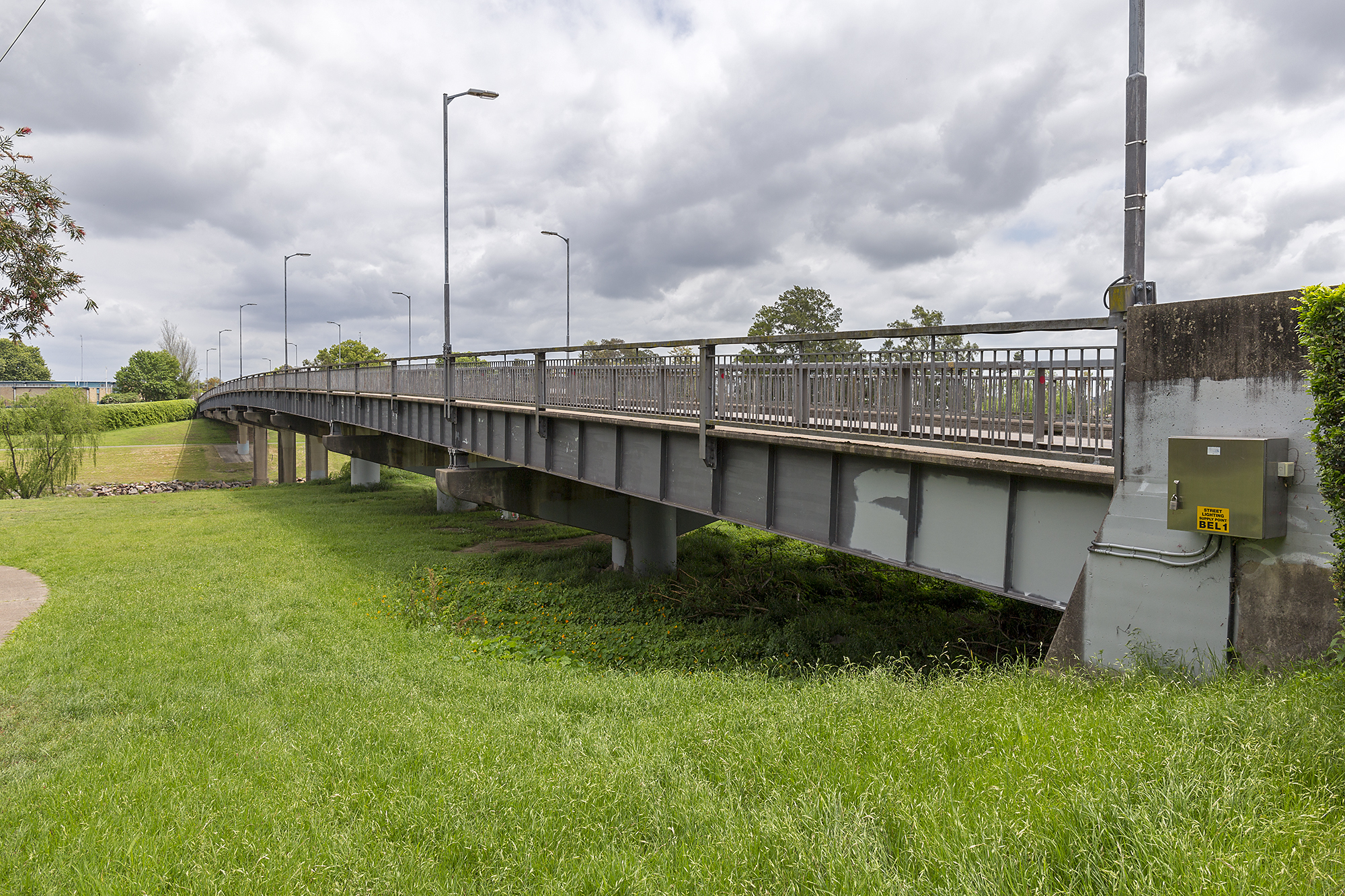
Belmore Bridge from the Lorn side

The first bridge to link West Maitland with what is now the suburb of Lorn was opened in 1869 and named in honour of the then Governor of New South Wales, the 4th Earl of Belmore. Although the bridge proved vital to the city's development, the floods of 1893, 1913 and 1930 began to heighten the need for a new bridge that could withstand periodic flooding. A second Belmore Bridge, designed to withstand the impact of debris during floods, was built adjacent to the 1869 bridge in 1964. The new bridge, which redirected traffic away from St Andrews Street to a new intersection at the Maitland Court House, is one of the city's three main river crossings.

=== Floods ===
| Year | Details |
|---|---|
| 1806 | Prior to settlement, but biggest on record. Reports of floodwaters being as high as 24.4 m (80 ft). |
| 1820 | Settlers report finding driftwood in trees 18.9 m (62 ft) above the normal river level. |
| 1832 | Seven killed, floodwaters peak at 8.9 m (29 ft). |
| 1834 | Floodwaters peak at 8.9 m (29 ft). |
| 1857 | Floodwaters peak at 9.2 m (30 ft). |
| 1864 | The June 1864 flood was made worse after a series of wet seasons and repeated floods between then and 1857. It saw hundreds of people forced to evacuate. |
| 1867 | The 1867 floods saw 2000 acres of agricultural land to South West of Maitland inundated. |
| 1893 | Extensive flooding destroys homes in Louth Park and Victoria Street. Nine killed. |
| 1913 | Floodwaters inundate central Maitland. Homes are lost on Mount Pleasant Street and in Horseshoe Bend. |
| 1930 | Floodwaters inundate Maitland. |
| 1931 | Floodwaters inundate Maitland. |
| 1949 | Floodwaters invade lower High Street, Maitland. |
| 1951 | Flooding in Maitland. |
| 1952 | Flooding in Maitland. |
| 1955 | Twenty five killed, 2,180 homes inundated by water. |
| 1971 | Biggest flood on record since 1955. |
| 1998 | Minor flooding in the Maitland district. |
| 2007 | Floodwaters invade suburbs of Maitland; central Maitland escapes flooding. |
| 2015 | Superstorm hits the Hunter, flash-flooding in Maitland. |
| 2022 | La Niña hits Maitland inundating all of Maitland flood land; Gillieston Heights isolated from Maitland in the process. |

Maitland's proximity to the Hunter River has resulted in a succession of floods since European settlement. Over 200 floods have occurred on the Hunter River since settlement, 13 of those higher than the river's normal peak limit of 10.7 metres (35.1 ft). Of these 13, all have had a direct effect on the city of Maitland.

Between 1830 and 1834 Maitland experienced five floods. The 1832 flood was severe with water reaching about 8.84 m (29 ft) and killing seven people. The 1834 flood water reached the same height. In the winter of 1857 the Hunter River rose again to record heights, reaching 9.2 m (30 ft). Flooding continued for the next 30 years with the floods of the 1890s being the most disastrous. Much of the riverbank collapsed and many people were left without homes or personal possessions.

Flooding was described as an "annoyance" and "detrimental to the town" in the 7 April 1840 advertisement for the sale of "Windermere" where position "on a hill" was described as an appealing feature.

The 1940s and 1950s saw an increase in rainfall and the river rose again and again. In February 1955, Maitland and the Hunter Valley experienced its most severe flood in recorded history. The 1955 Hunter Valley floods, also commonly known as "The Maitland Flood", was the first Australian natural disaster to be broadcast by the media on an international scale. This flood is considered to be one of Australia's worst floods. The waters reached 12.5 m (41 ft) and caused catastrophic damage and loss of life. The volume of flood water was approximately 3,750,000 megalitres (8.2×10^{11} imp gal) and the cost of damage, in today's currency, would have been over A$2 billion. Seven thousand buildings and homes were damaged and the flood claimed the lives of 14 people.

In early June 2007 an intense low pressure system which caused devastating storms to hit the city of Newcastle and the Central Coast also caused major flooding throughout the lower Hunter Region including the Maitland area. During the flooding in 2007, the Hunter River was expected to reach a peak of 11.3 m (37.1 ft) at Maitland's Belmore Bridge and break levee banks. Some 4000 residents of the suburb of Lorn were evacuated before the floodwaters became stable at 10.7 m (35.1 ft) and did not inundate central Maitland. Other areas did not escape with waters inundating homes in Branxton, Louth Park and Raymond Terrace. The flood has been compared to the devastating 1955 Hunter Valley floods.

From 20 to 22 April 2015, heavy rainfall in the Hunter, Central Coast and Sydney regions of New South Wales resulted in flash flooding and extended power outages to over 200,000 homes. Maitland was badly affected and the flood gates at Maitland railway station were reinforced with sandbags to prevent flooding in central Maitland. Four people died as a result of the storms and a further four died in traffic related incidents. The towns of Dungog and Gillieston Heights, the homes of the four flood victims, were also badly affected, becoming isolated from other communities.

Flooding at Maitland

Maitland railway station in flood, 1930

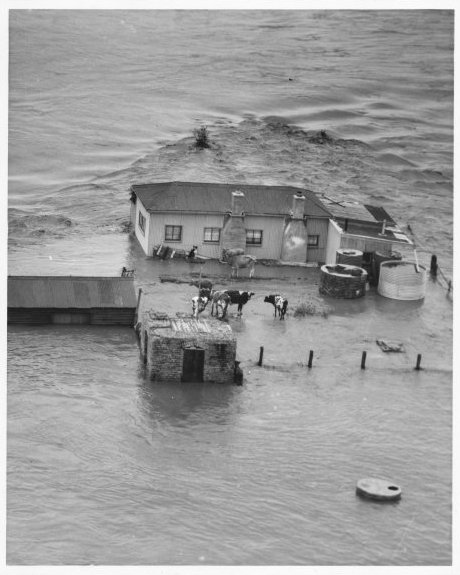
A deserted farmhouse on the outskirts of Maitland during the 1955 flood

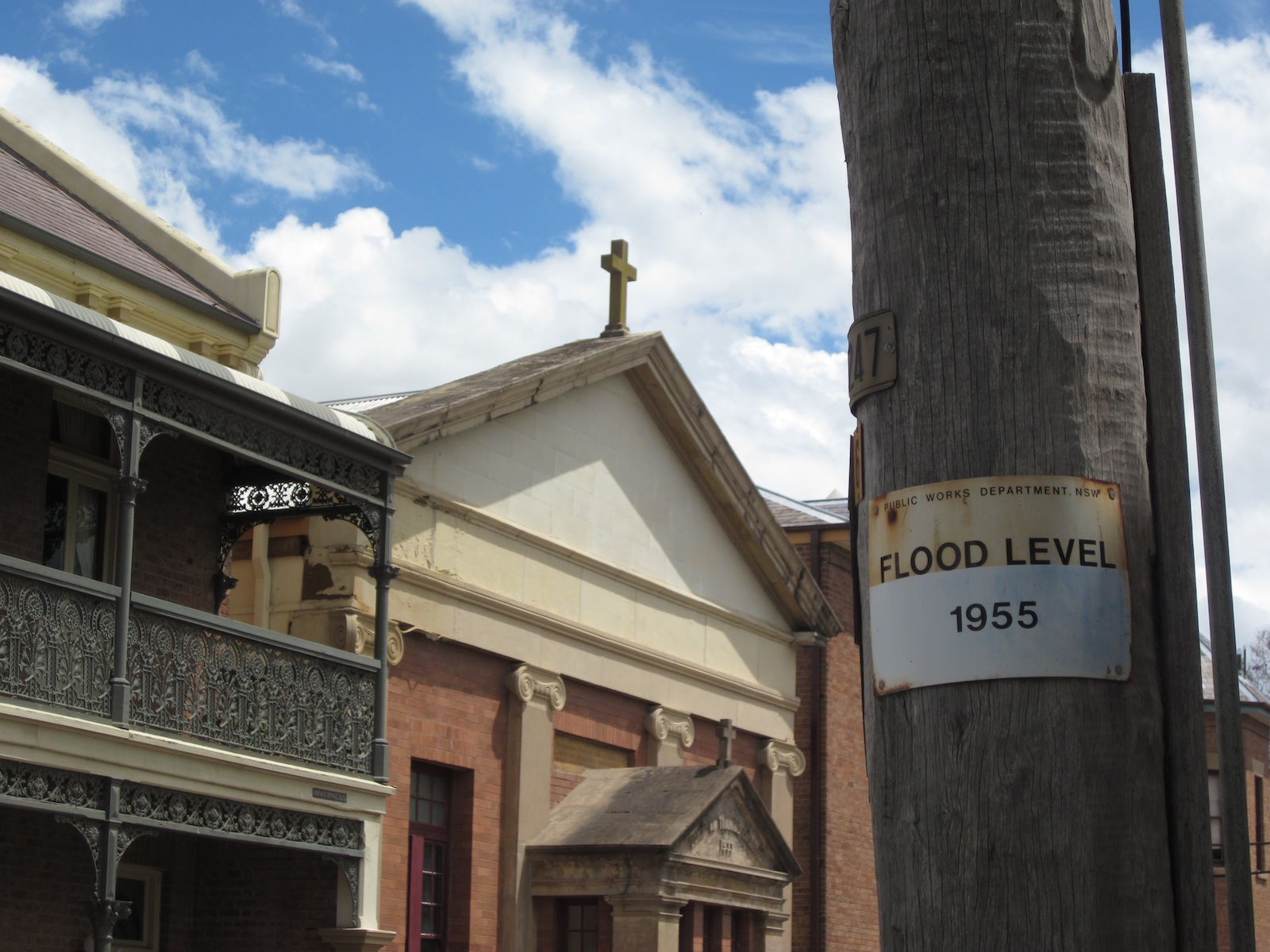
Signs on Maitland's power poles indicate the depth of the 1955 floods

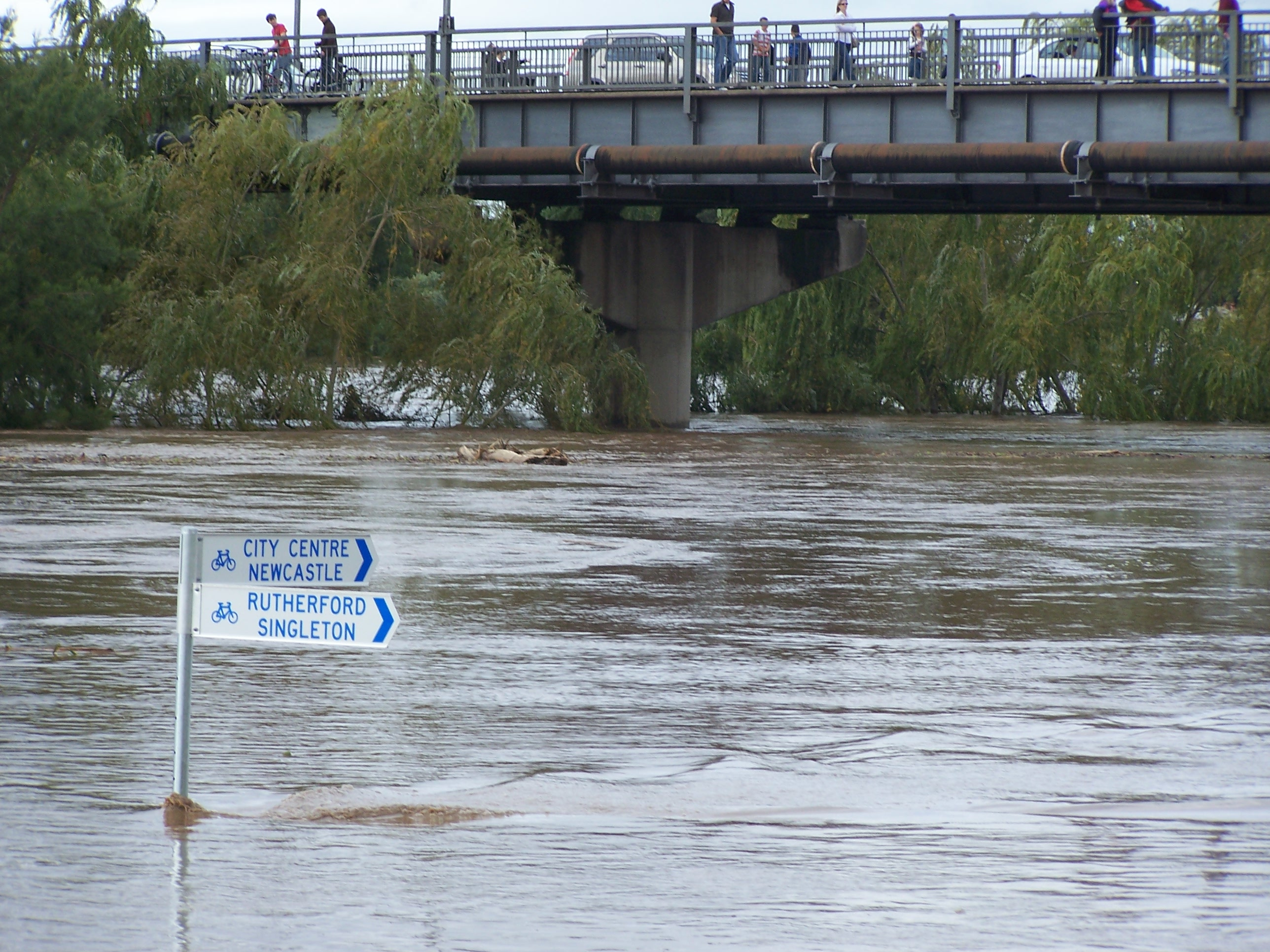
Flooding along the Maitland riverfront during the 2007 flood

=== Jewish community ===
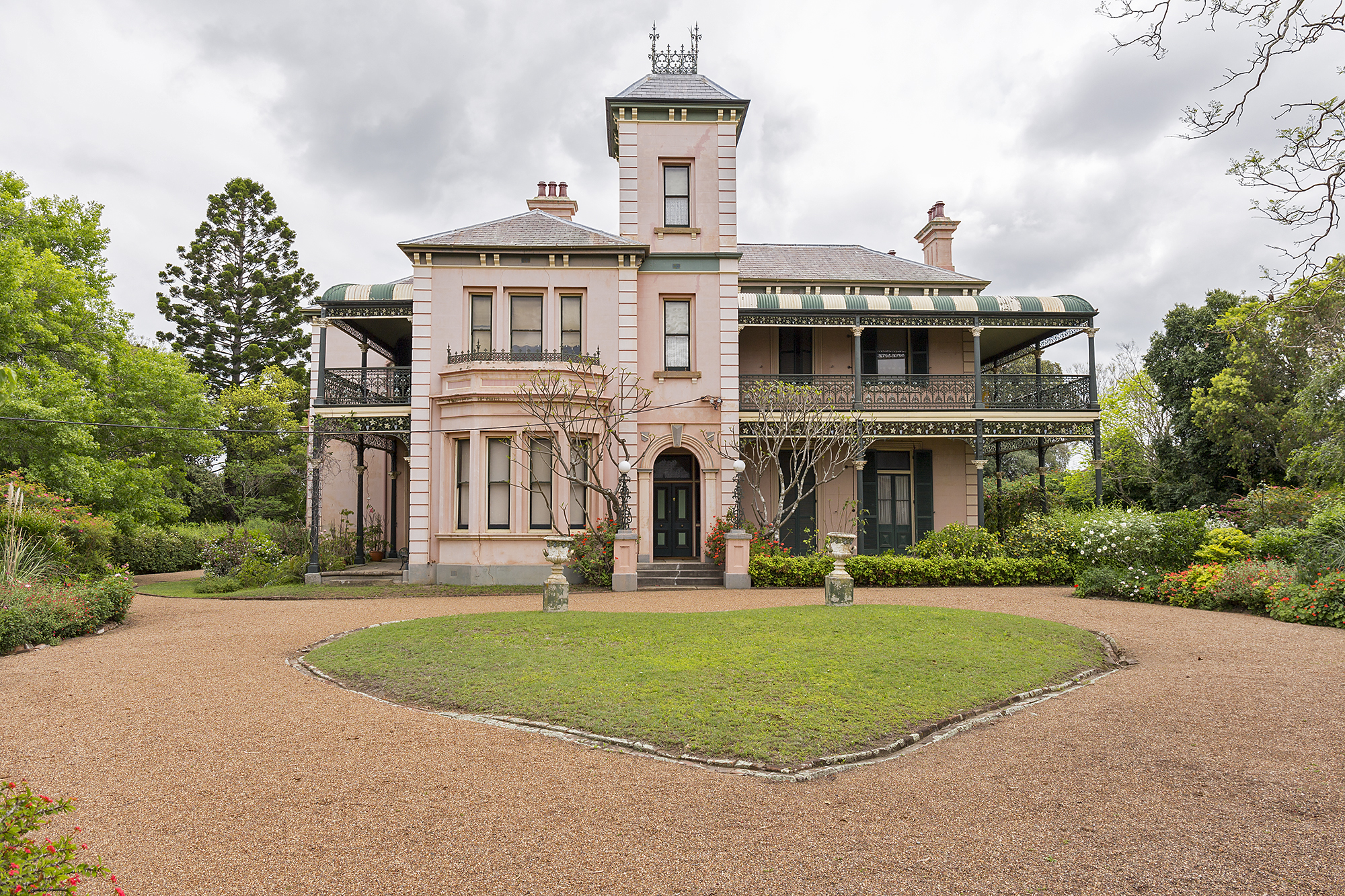
Cintra House was built for Benn Levy and Neville Cohen, who were both important Jewish merchants in Australia and internationally

The Maitland Jewish Cemetery in Louth Park, one of only two provincial Jewish cemeteries in New South Wales, is testament to the Jewish community that was active in Maitland up until the 1930s. Between about 1846 and 1934, 53 Jewish people were buried in the low-lying cemetery. Burials ceased after this time due to dispersion of the community and the cemetery reaching capacity. One exception was Lea Abadee in 2010. The former Maitland Synagogue, located on Church Street, was the place of worship for about 70 families between 1879 and 1898.

== Hospital ==
The Immigrants Home was founded by Caroline Chisholm in East Maitland and was the first public building that was used to treat the sick. The site eventually became known as Maitland Benevolent Asylum. In 1835, when the population hit 1900, residents started to petition for a new hospital. In 1843 a meeting was called to discuss applying to Benevolent Asylum in Sydney. A committee was formed and succeeded in obtaining a grant of £1000 for a new hospital on 5 December 1844. In April 1845 Sir George Gipps approved a grant of a site at Campbell's Hill, West Maitland opposite Boyne's Inn. The foundation stone was laid by Edward Denny Day on 26 January 1846. In April 1846 the foundation stone was removed and was never recovered. In September 1847 the Building Committee announced that plans for the building of the new hospital would be accepted. The cost of the building was not to exceed £2000 and fifteen guineas would be awarded to the party furnishing the approved plan. By May 1848 the Maitland Mercury was reporting that the walls of the new hospital were visible from the town. Opened in 1850 its first years saw 231 patients and 26 deaths. Between 1903 and 1905 saw the completion of the Ward Block 1 at the southern end of the hospital. With the growth of population in the district, it was found that the accommodation was inadequate and a new building was erected and opened in 1905. In 1916 a blood bank and isolation cottage were completed. In 1926 the hospital became a training school for nurses. New nurses' quarters which occupied the site of the old Royal Oak Hotel was built during the twelve months from October 1927 to October 1928. In the 1930s Ward Block 3 was built and extensions were completed to the nurses home in 1932 and 1937.

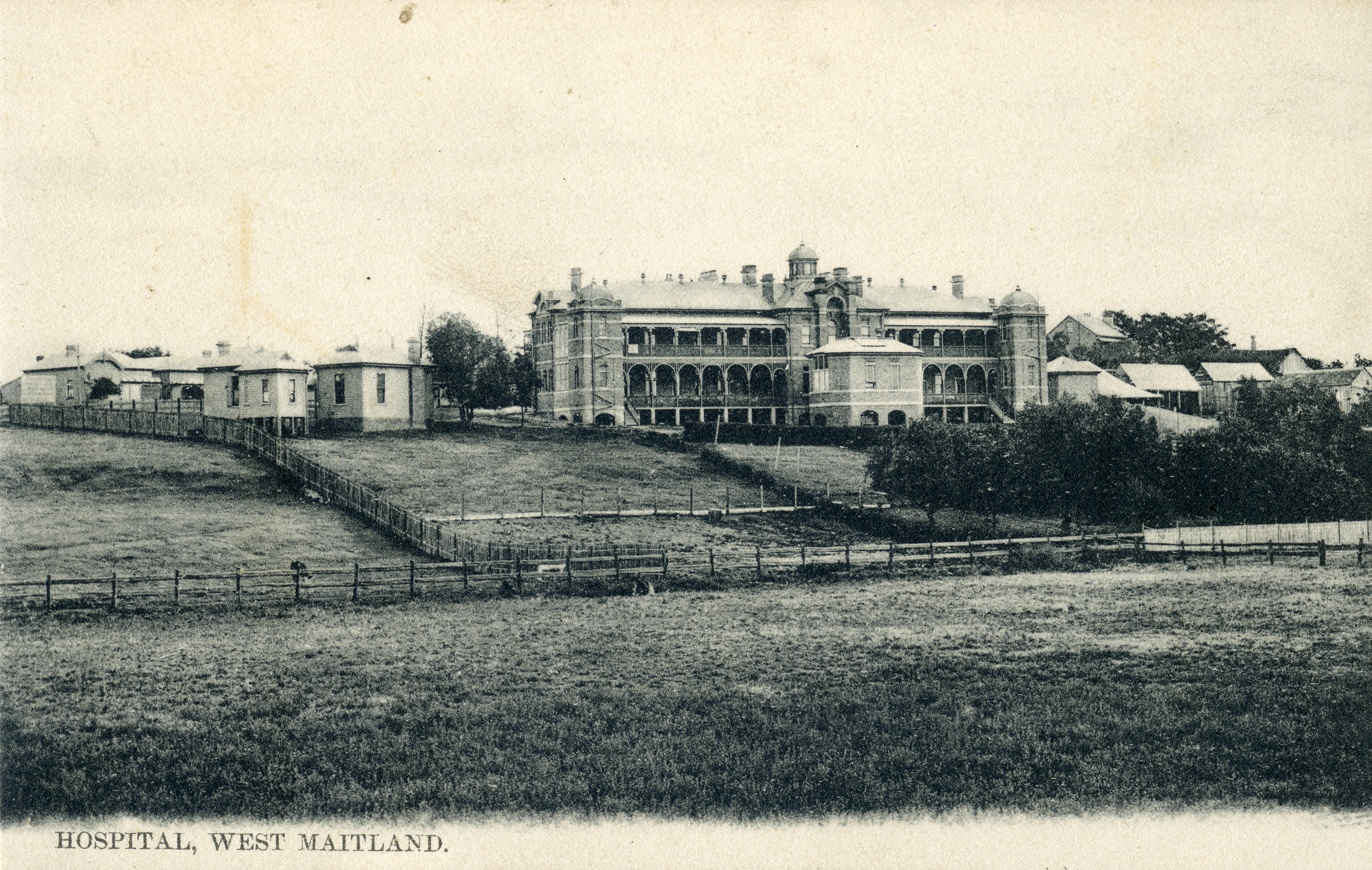
View of Maitland Hospital from a post card n.d.

The Addison Building (Ward Block 2) was progressively built and opened between 1942 and 1947. In 1960 new Nurses homes was built. In 1973 a new pathology building was opened. From 1975 to 1979 a new boilerhouse and workshops were built and the kitchen, cafeteria and storage areas were refurbished.

The hospital was funded through subscribers, collection boxes, donations and state revenue for fines. In 1847 Governor Sir Charles Fitzroy visited to the hospital to hand over a £10.

The Maitland Hospital was listed as a public hospital under the Second Schedule of the Public Hospitals Act, 1898 (Act No.16, 1898). Maitland Hospital was registered as a training hospital under the Nurses Registration Act, 1924 (Act No.37, 1924). From 1 November 1929 'The Maitland Hospital' was a hospital incorporated under Part IV of the Public Hospitals Act 1929 (Act No.8, 1929). Under this Act The Maitland Hospital was to be governed by a board of directors which could make by-laws and its subscribers were a body corporate which could be sue and be sued in its corporate name. ·The Area Health Services Act 1986 (Act No.50, 1986), which commenced on1 July 1986, effectively abolished the boards of directors and replaced them with area health boards this made the hospital a part of the Lower Hunter Area Health Service. From 1 August 1988 following the amalgamation of area health services the Maitland Hospital became part of the Hunter Area Health Service. Following amendments to the Health Services Act 1997 the Maitland Hospital became part of the Hunter and New England Area Health Service from 1 January 2005.

== Heritage listings ==
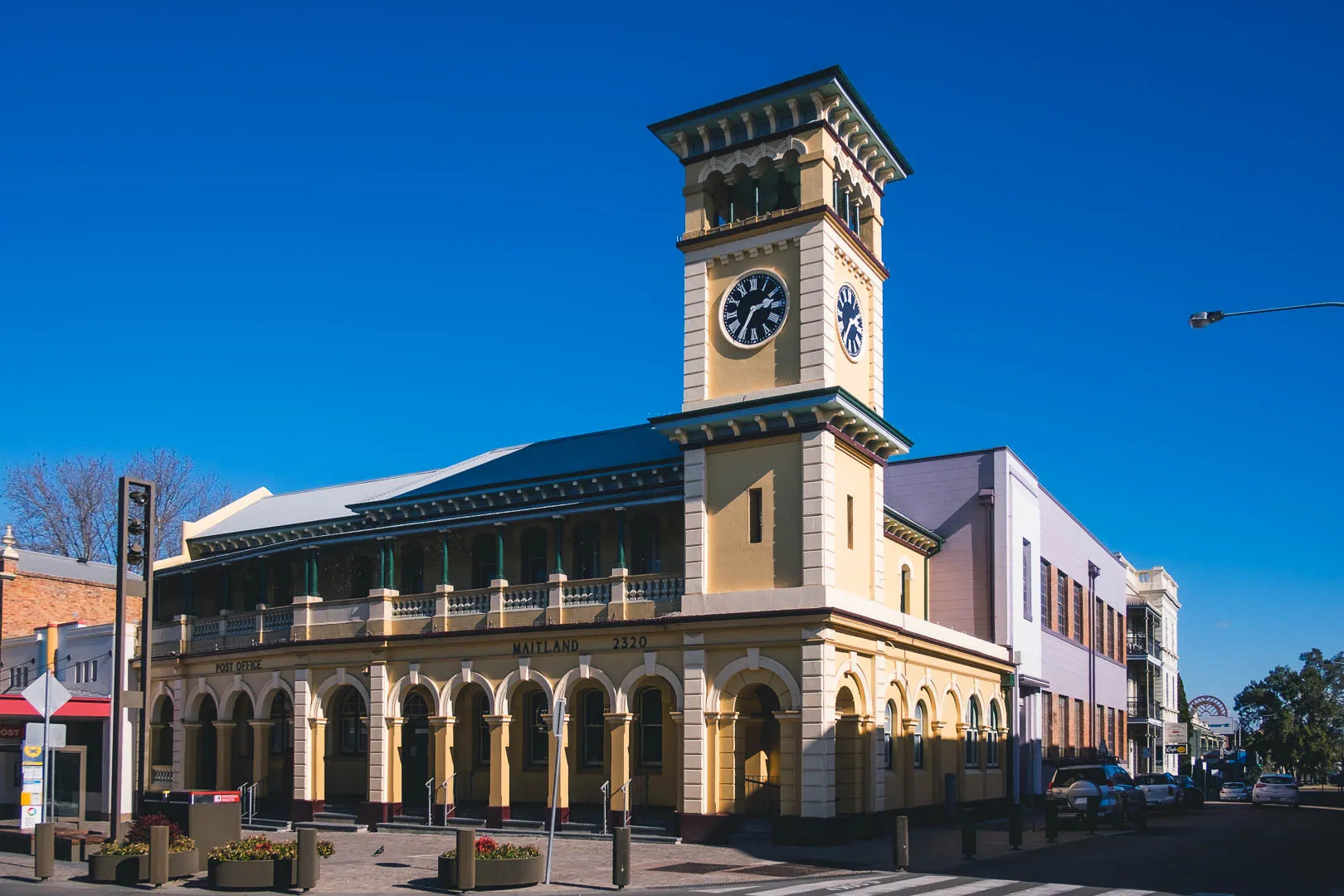
Maitland Post Office

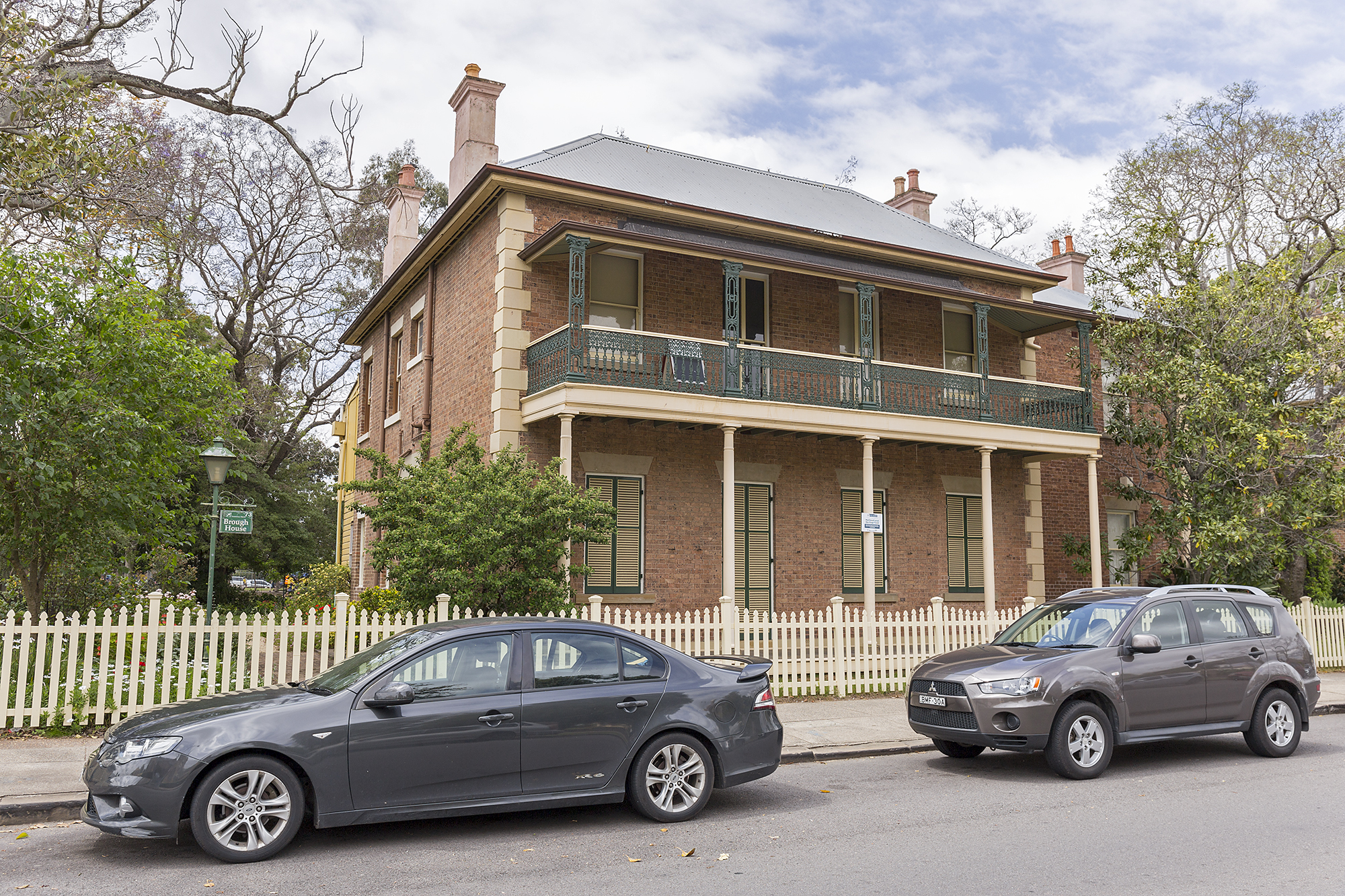
Brough House

Maitland has a number of heritage-listed sites, including:

- Church Street: Brough House
- 47 Church Street: Maitland Synagogue
- 66 Church Street: St Mary's the Virgin Anglican Church
- 71 Church Street: Grossmann House
- 12–14 Free Church Street: Presbyterian High School
- High Street: Maitland Court House
- High Street: Maitland Town Hall
- 381 High Street: Maitland Post Office
- 473 High Street: Barden and Ribee Saddlery
- 516 High Street: Department of Mineral Resources Historic Photographs Collection
- Main Northern railway: Maitland railway station
- 34 Regent Street: Cintra House
- 5 Victoria Street: Maitland Lodge of Unity Masonic Hall and Lodge

== Population ==
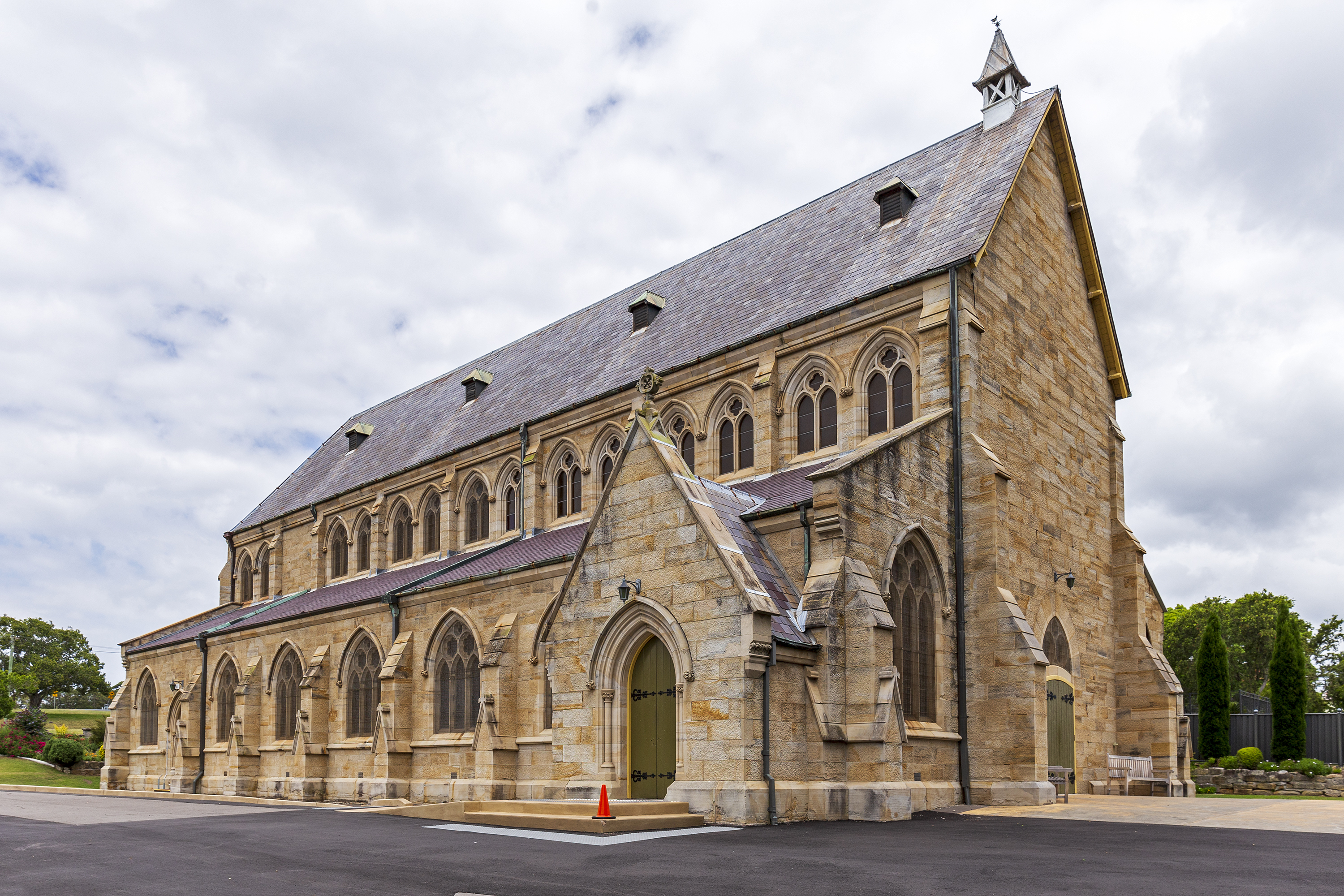
Saint Peter's Anglican Parish

According to the 2021 census, there were 89,597 people in Maitland.

- Aboriginal and Torres Strait Islander people made up 7.7% of the population.
- 86.9% of people were born in Australia. The next most common countries of birth were England 1.8%, New Zealand 1.0%, India 0.9%, Philippines 0.6% and South Africa 0.4%.
- 90.4% of people spoke only English at home. Other languages spoken at home included Malayalam 0.4%, Punjabi 0.4%, Mandarin 0.3%, Tagalog 0.3%, Afrikaans 0.2%.
- The most common responses for religion were No Religion 38.5%, Catholic 22.6%, and Anglican 18.2%.

Historical population
| Year | Pop. | ±% |
|---|---|---|
| 1921 | 12,008 | — |
| 1933 | 12,224 | +1.8% |
| 1947 | 19,151 | +56.7% |
| 1954 | 21,331 | +11.4% |
| 1961 | 22,917 | +7.4% |
| 1966 | 23,118 | +0.9% |
| 1971 | 24,537 | +6.1% |
| 1976 | 36,030 | +46.8% |
| 1981 | 38,865 | +7.9% |
| 1986 | 43,247 | +11.3% |
| 1991 | 45,209 | +4.5% |
| 1996 | 50,108 | +10.8% |
| 2001 | 53,391 | +6.6% |
| 2006 | 61,431 | +15.1% |
| 2011 | 67,132 | +9.3% |
| 2016 | 78,015 | +16.2% |
| 2021 | 89,597 | +14.8% |
Source: Australian Bureau of Statistics data.

== Crime ==
Maitland has an assault rate of 1,110.4 per 100,000 population, which is significantly higher than the NSW state average of 823.4 per 100,000 population.

== Climate ==
Maitland experiences a humid subtropical climate (Köppen: Cfa, Trewartha: Cfal), with hot summers and mild to cool winters, and with a summer peak in rainfall. The highest temperature recorded at Maitland was 44.5 °C (112.1 °F) on 18 January 2013 and 21 February 2004; the lowest recorded was −4.5 °C (23.9 °F) on 24 August 2003. The average annual rainfall is 837.5 millimetres (32.97 in). On average, it has 90.3 clear days annually.

Climate data for Maitland Visitors Centre (1997–2016)
| Month | Jan | Feb | Mar | Apr | May | Jun | Jul | Aug | Sep | Oct | Nov | Dec | Year |
|---|---|---|---|---|---|---|---|---|---|---|---|---|---|
| Record high °C (°F) | 44.5 (112.1) | 44.5 (112.1) | 40.0 (104.0) | 36.0 (96.8) | 29.5 (85.1) | 24.6 (76.3) | 24.8 (76.6) | 30.5 (86.9) | 35.2 (95.4) | 39.5 (103.1) | 43.0 (109.4) | 42.2 (108.0) | 44.5 (112.1) |
| Mean daily maximum °C (°F) | 30.2 (86.4) | 29.4 (84.9) | 27.7 (81.9) | 24.6 (76.3) | 21.4 (70.5) | 18.4 (65.1) | 18.0 (64.4) | 20.0 (68.0) | 23.2 (73.8) | 25.7 (78.3) | 27.0 (80.6) | 28.8 (83.8) | 24.5 (76.1) |
| Mean daily minimum °C (°F) | 18.2 (64.8) | 18.1 (64.6) | 16.1 (61.0) | 12.4 (54.3) | 8.4 (47.1) | 6.6 (43.9) | 5.4 (41.7) | 5.6 (42.1) | 8.4 (47.1) | 11.0 (51.8) | 14.5 (58.1) | 16.4 (61.5) | 11.8 (53.2) |
| Record low °C (°F) | 8.4 (47.1) | 9.8 (49.6) | 7.0 (44.6) | 0.7 (33.3) | −0.9 (30.4) | −1.8 (28.8) | −3.5 (25.7) | −4.5 (23.9) | 0.0 (32.0) | 3.0 (37.4) | 3.4 (38.1) | 5.3 (41.5) | −4.5 (23.9) |
| Average precipitation mm (inches) | 78.0 (3.07) | 104.6 (4.12) | 85.5 (3.37) | 94.0 (3.70) | 59.0 (2.32) | 85.1 (3.35) | 42.5 (1.67) | 35.7 (1.41) | 48.1 (1.89) | 56.4 (2.22) | 81.0 (3.19) | 67.6 (2.66) | 838.1 (33.00) |
| Average precipitation days | 10.8 | 11.3 | 11.2 | 12.0 | 10.2 | 12.8 | 9.8 | 8.3 | 8.8 | 8.9 | 12.0 | 10.5 | 126.6 |
| Average afternoon relative humidity (%) | 52 | 58 | 59 | 58 | 57 | 61 | 57 | 48 | 48 | 50 | 54 | 52 | 55 |
| Average dew point °C (°F) | 16.9 (62.4) | 18.0 (64.4) | 16.6 (61.9) | 13.4 (56.1) | 10.4 (50.7) | 9.0 (48.2) | 7.5 (45.5) | 6.6 (43.9) | 8.9 (48.0) | 11.0 (51.8) | 13.7 (56.7) | 15.5 (59.9) | 12.3 (54.1) |

== Economy ==
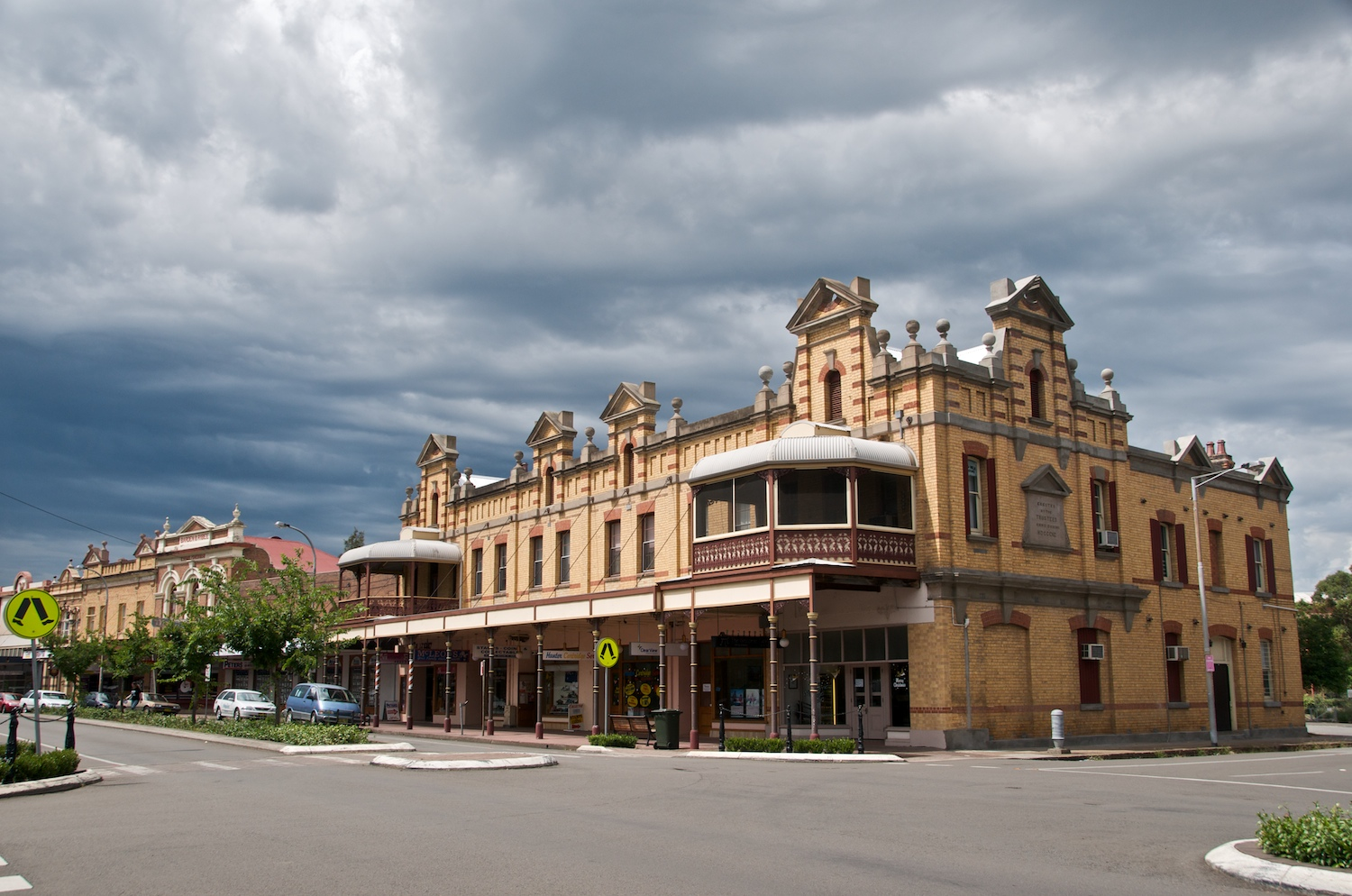
High Street

=== Retail ===
Maitland has many shopping precincts including Stockland Green Hills (East Maitland), Centro Maitland Hunter Mall, High Street Mall (City Centre), Rutherford, Melbourne Street (East Maitland) and Lawes Street (East Maitland). Morpeth, a suburb of Maitland, is also popular for its fashion boutiques, cafes and speciality shops. Historically, Maitland had E.P Capper & Sons founded in 1841. At the time it was seems as important as Anthony Hordens of Sydney.

== Transport ==
=== Buses ===
Bus services in Maitland are operated by Hunter Valley Buses and Rover Coaches.

=== Rail ===
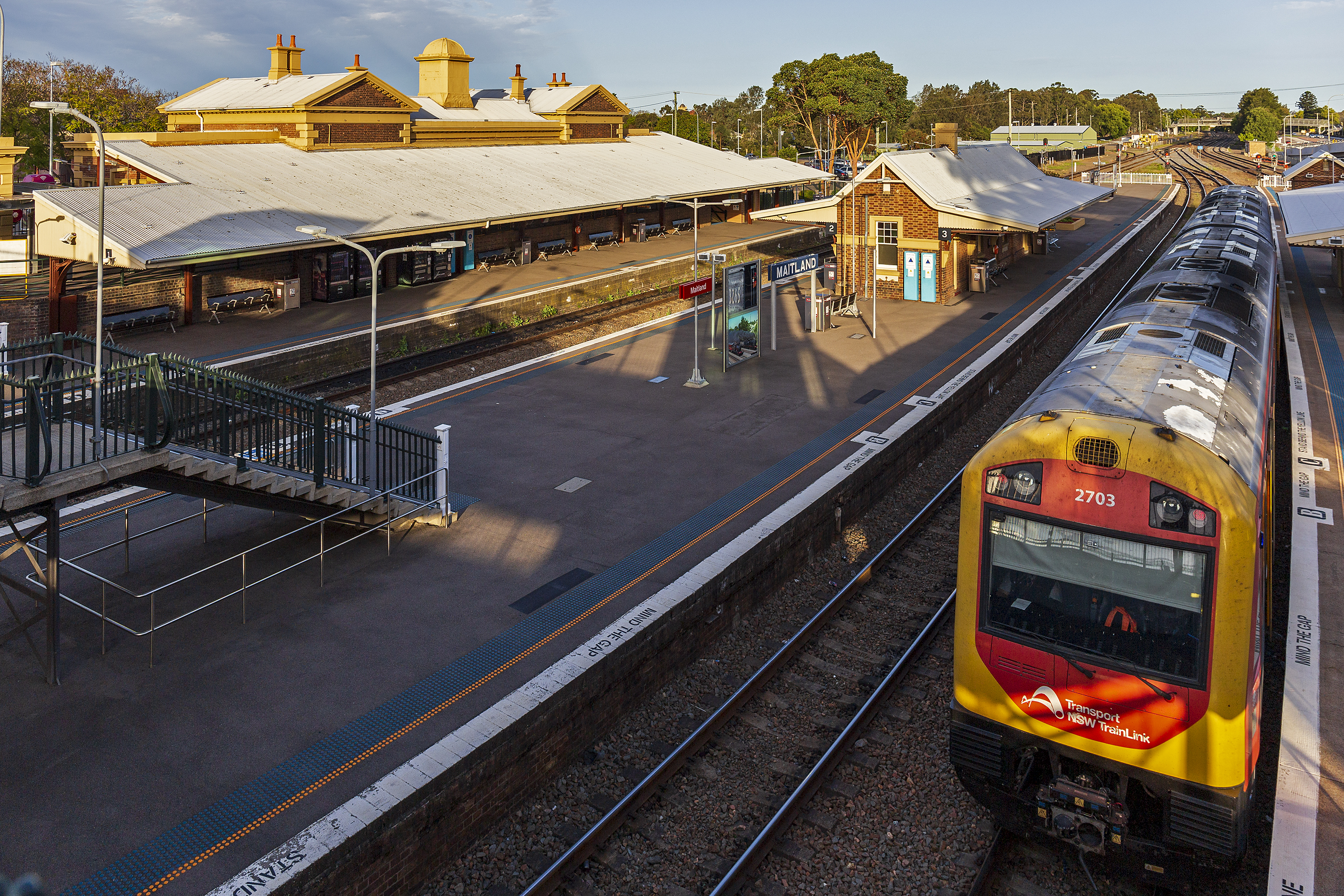
Maitland railway station

Maitland railway station lies on the Hunter Line and Main Northern line and is the junction point for the North Coast Line. Other railway stations in Maitland include:

- East Maitland
- High Street
- Metford
- Mindaribba
- Telarah
- Victoria Street
- Thornton
- Lochinvar

A passenger tram system ran from East Maitland to West Maitland between 1909 and 1926 after which it was replaced by buses which continue to service the route today.

=== Air ===
Maitland Airport is a general aviation airfield located beside the New England Highway at Rutherford. Construction was started in 1948 by the now-defunct Maitland Aero Club. In 1957, operation of the airfield transferred to the Royal Newcastle Aero Club which moved from Broadmeadow Aerodrome, its original base of operations, in 1963. The closest commercial airport is Newcastle Airport which is at Williamtown.

== Media ==
Maitland is serviced by a number of regional newspapers, radio stations and television stations.

=== Print ===
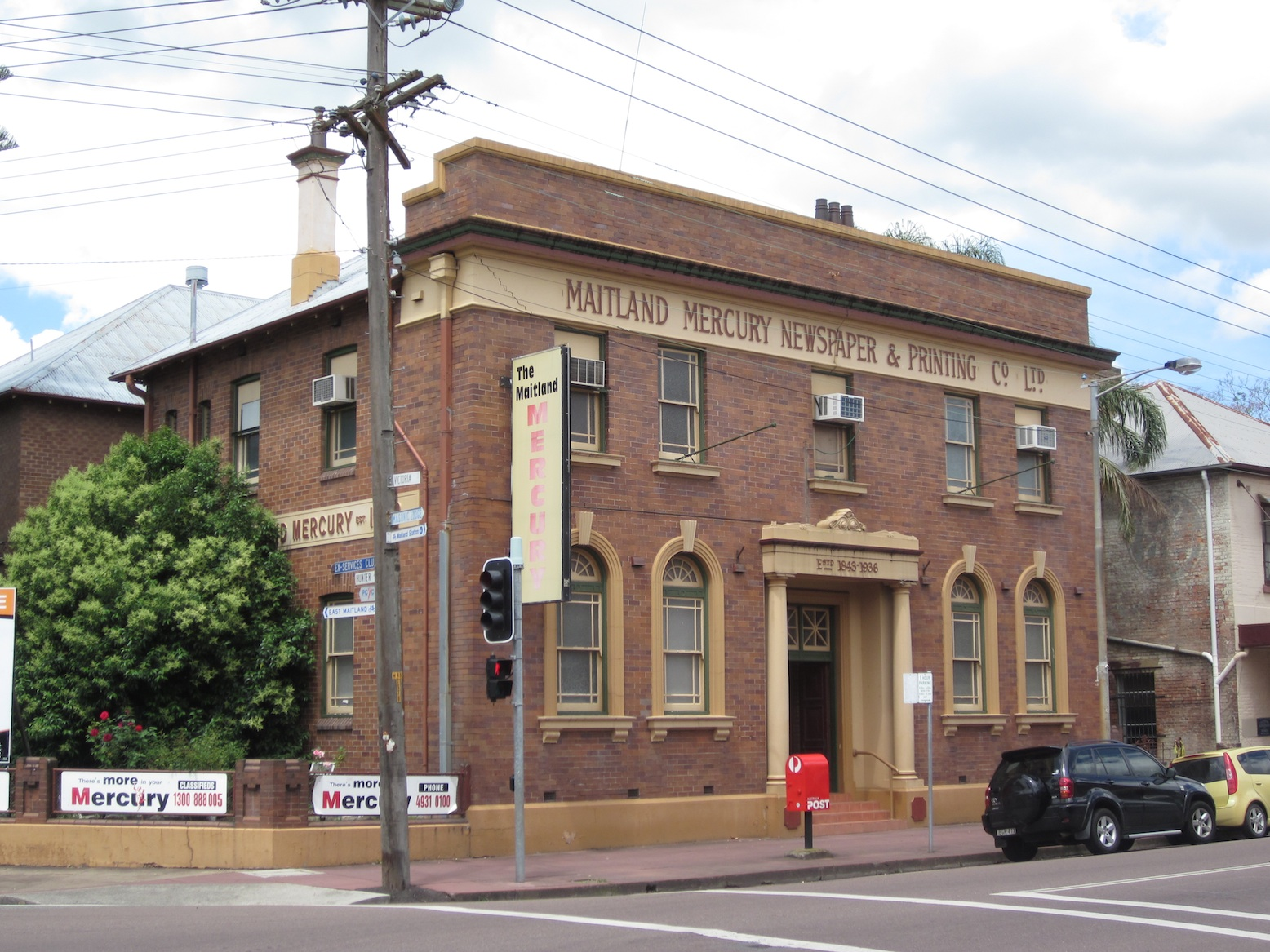
The Maitland Mercury is Australia's oldest regional newspaper

The Maitland Mercury and Newcastle Herald are the foremost newspapers in the city. The Mercury, established in 1843, operates out of offices on High Street and is Australia's oldest regional newspaper. The Lower Hunter Star is an adjunct to the Mercury and is published every Thursday. With a circulation of almost 20,000, The Lower Hunter Star is delivered to most residents within the City of Maitland.

=== Radio ===
Radio stations include:

==== AM stations ====
- 2HD (commercial)
- ABC Newcastle (ABC Local Radio)
- 2HRN (off band commercial)
- Sky Sports Radio (as part of statewide network)

==== FM stations ====
- Triple M Newcastle (commercial)
- hit106.9 Newcastle (commercial)
- New FM (commercial)
- 2NUR (community)
- 2CHR (Central Hunter Radio) 96.5 FM – (community)
- Rhema FM Newcastle (Christian)
- Triple J (Australian Broadcasting Corporation)
- Australian Broadcasting Corporation
  - ABC Newcastle
  - Radio National
  - ABC NewsRadio
  - Triple J (youth station)
  - ABC Classic (classical music)
- SBS Radio (foreign language service)

=== Television ===
Maitland is part of the Newcastle–Hunter Region television market, which is served by 5 television networks, three commercial and two national services. These networks are listed as follows:

- Nine Northern NSW, 9Gem, 9Go! and 9Life: (A Nine Network owned and operated station since 2007, established 1962).
- Network 10, 10 Drama, 10 Comedy and Nickelodeon (Network 10 owned and operated station since 2025) (formerly branded as Southern Cross Ten, Ten Northern NSW, NRTV and WIN). (It was established as a result of aggregation on 31 December 1991).
- Seven Network (formerly known as Prime Television and Prime7), 7two (digital only), 7mate (digital only), 7Bravo (digital only) and 7flix (digital only) (Seven Network / Prime affiliate was established as a result of aggregation on 31 December 1991). A Seven Network owned and operated station since 2022.
- Australian Broadcasting Corporation including ABC TV, ABC Family, ABC Kids, ABC Entertains and ABC News. The ABC TV service was established in the 1960s.
- Special Broadcasting Service including SBS, SBS2, SBS Food, SBS World Movies, SBS WorldWatch and NITV. Special Broadcasting Service is an Australian government operated. This service was introduced in the 1980s.

The Nine Network (as NBN) produces an evening news bulletin combining local, state, national and international news screening weeknights at 5:30 pm on the Nine Network, while Seven (formerly Prime7) and Network 10 produce short local news updates to fulfil local content quotas. Subscription television service Foxtel is also available via satellite.

=== Theatre ===
The famous Scottish entertainer Sir Harry Lauder performed to a packed audience in Maitland Town Hall on Saturday 15 August 1925.

== Culture ==
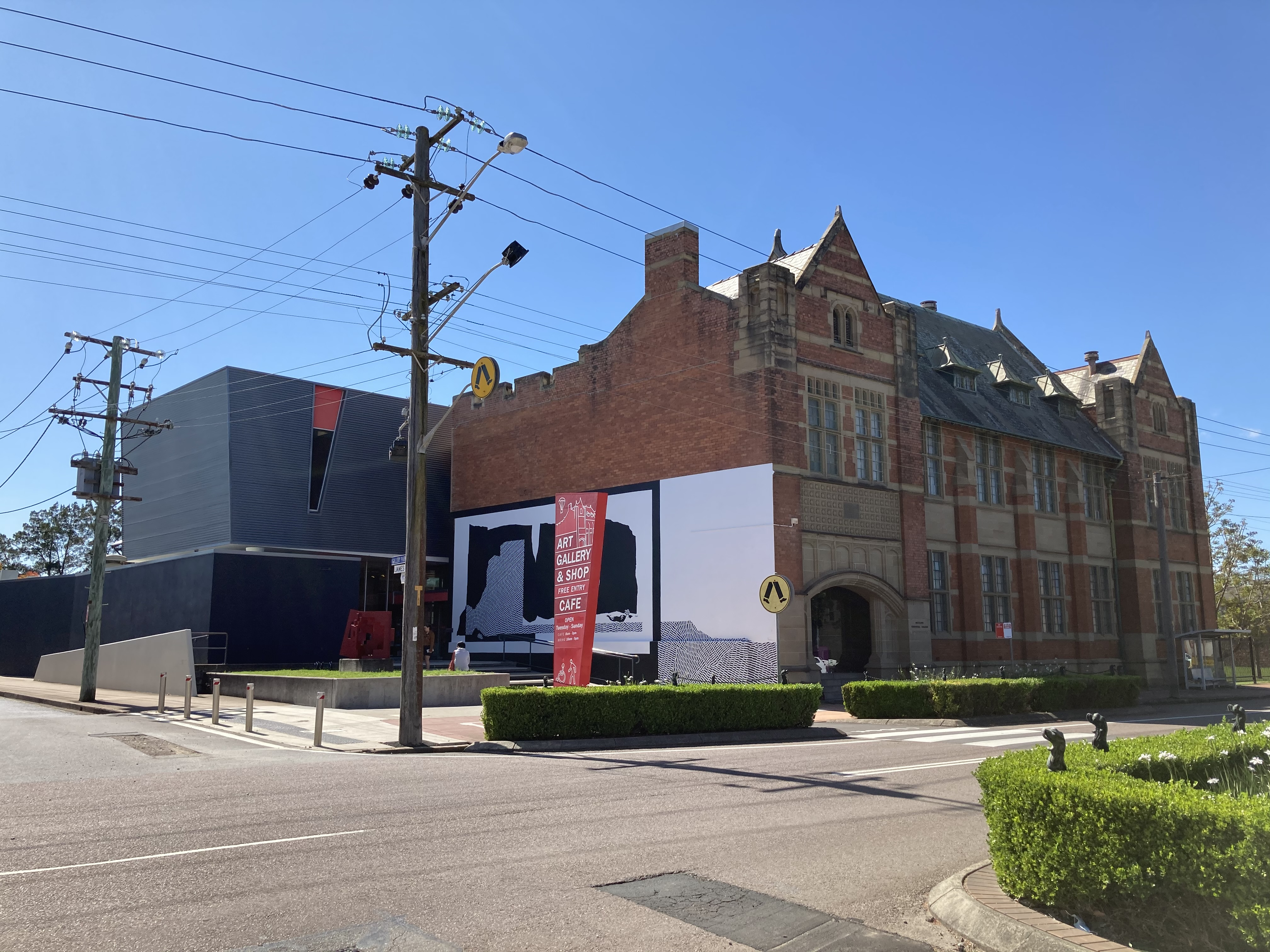
Maitland Regional Art Gallery

=== Art ===
Maitland Regional Art Gallery, or MRAG, opened at its current site in November 2003. In 2008, the gallery closed for redevelopment and was reopened on 15 August 2009 by the artist Margaret Olley.

=== Library ===
Maitland and the surrounding area is serviced by the Maitland City Library and branches.

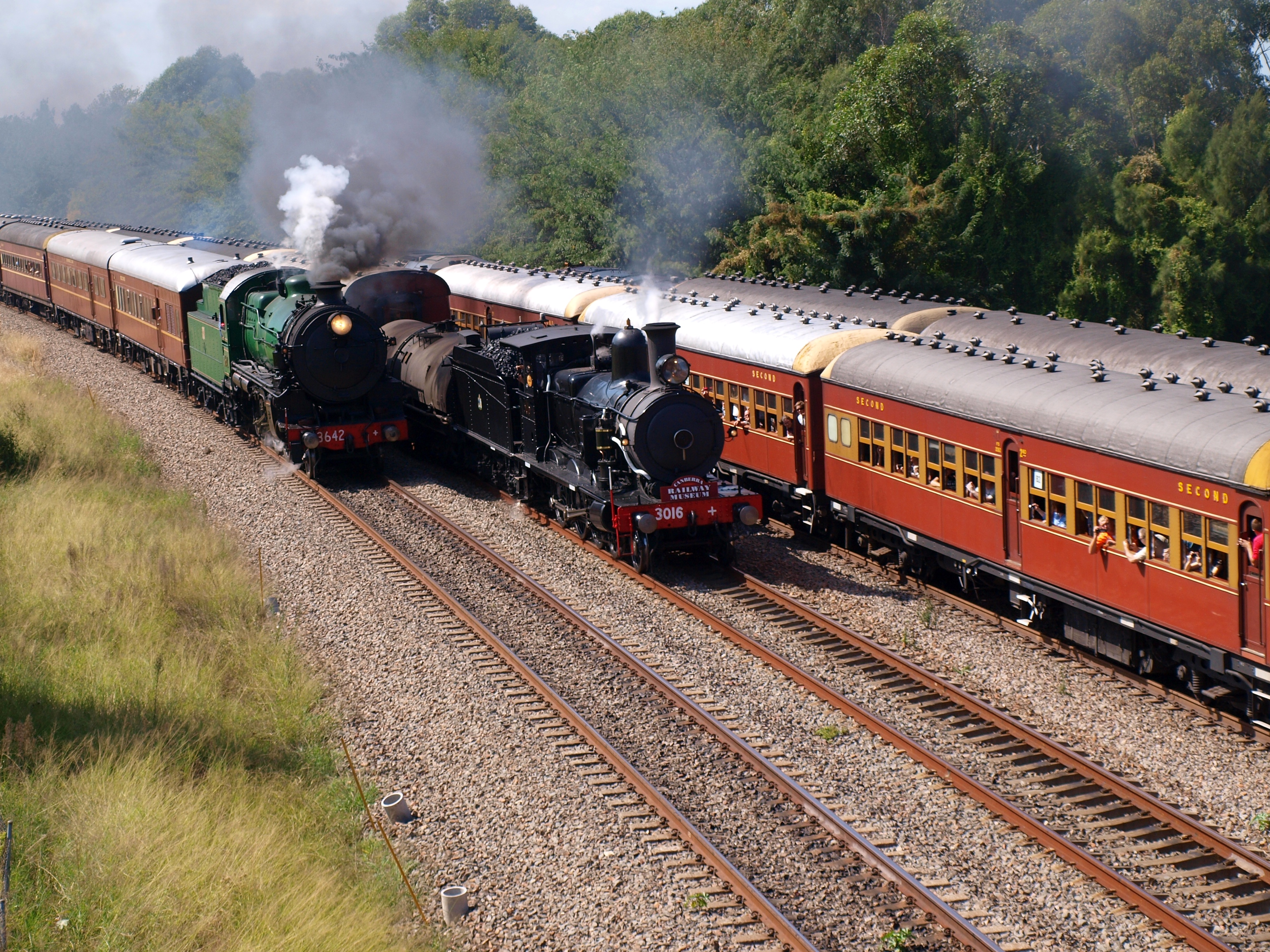
The 2016 Hunter Valley Steamfest

== Annual events ==
- Hunter Valley Steamfest is an annual festival celebrating the history of steam power and industry in the Maitland area. It was established in 1986 in response to the closure of the last coal operated steam hauled freight service on the South Maitland Railway network in 1983.
- Bitter & Twisted Beer Festival is an annual international boutique beer festival held at the historic Maitland Gaol in East Maitland.
- ChapelJazz (formerly Morpeth Jazz Festival) is an annual music festival held at the popular historic riverside port of Morpeth. It is a celebration of music, wine and food.
- Groovin' the Moo is an annual music festival held at the Maitland Showground since 2006.
- Maitland Show is an annual agricultural show held at the Maitland Showground.

== Education ==
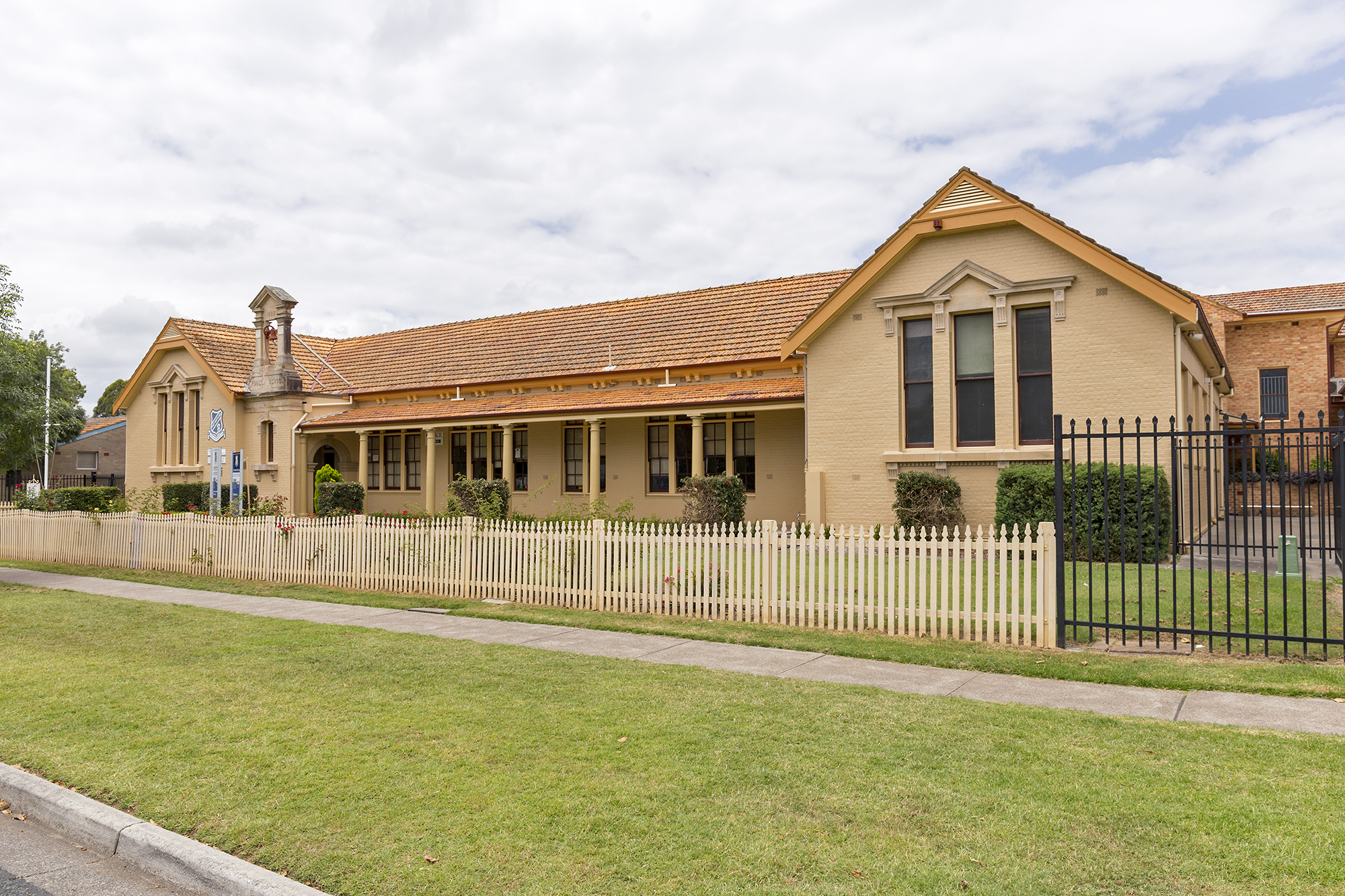
Maitland East Public School

Maitland has many educational facilities ranging from primary and high schools to short course vocational training operations. The Hunter Institute of TAFE has a campus in Maitland, as does the privately owned Hunter Valley Training Company that is Australia's largest group trainer. These facilities provide excellent training in all fields, especially building and construction, engineering, mining, tourism and business administration.

Maitland has twenty primary schools and seven high schools. Local high schools include:

- St Joseph's College, Lochinvar (formerly All Saints College, St Joseph's Campus)
- All Saints College, St Mary's Campus
- All Saints College, St Peter's Campus
- Hunter Valley Grammar School
- Maitland Christian School
- Maitland Grossmann High School (formerly Maitland Girls' High School)
- Maitland High School (formerly Maitland Boys' High School)
- Rutherford Technology High School
- Francis Greenway High School

There are also numerous pre-school and day care facilities.

== Sport and recreation ==
Maitland has a strong sporting community with a range of sporting competitions and clubs based in the city. This includes, but is not limited to, the following:

- Maitland FC – Association football club that competes in the National Premier Leagues Northern NSW competition.
- Maitland Pickers – Rugby league club that competes in the Newcastle Rugby League competition.
- Maitland Blacks – Rugby union club that competes in the Newcastle and Hunter Rugby Union competition.
- Maitland Saints – Australian rules football club that competes in the AFL Hunter Central Coast competition.
- Maitland Off-road Radio Car Club, racing at Harold Gregson Reserve.

Maitland Showground is an multi-purpose outdoor recreational area used for greyhound racing, known as Maitland Greyhounds and Harness Racing, around the exterior of the greyhound track. The site is also a historic landmark for motorcycle speedway having been regarded as the birth of the sport on 15 December 1923 when New Zealand born promoter Johnnie Hoskins organised a series of motorcycle races.

== Notable people ==
- William Arnott (1827–1901), biscuit manufacturer
- John Bell (1940–), actor
- David Berthold. theatre director
- Greg Bird (1984–), professional rugby league player
- Alexander Brown (1851–1926). merchant and politician
- George Lyndon Carpenter (1872–1948), Salvation Army general
- Caroline Chisholm (1808–1877), philanthropist, sheltered homeless immigrants in a cottage at Maitland
- Percy Brereton Colquhoun (1866–1936), sportsman, lawyer and politician
- Abbie Cornish (1982–), actress
- Michael Cox (born 1956), cricketer, born in Newcastle, raised in Maitland
- Ruth Cracknell (1925–2002), actress
- Les Darcy (1895–1917), boxer and folk hero
- Edward Davis (1816–1841), "Teddy the Jewboy", Australian convict turned bushranger
- Edward Denny Day (1801–1876), police magistrate
- Justin Dooley (1970–), rugby league player
- Luke Dorn (1982–), professional rugby league player
- Joseph Wilfrid Dwyer (1869–1939), Roman Catholic Bishop of Wagga Wagga
- Nick Enright (1950–2003), playwright
- H. V. Evatt (1894–1965), former leader of the Australian Labor Party, Third President of the United Nations General Assembly, Justice of the High Court of Australia, Chief Justice of the Supreme Court of New South Wales
- Clive Evatt (1900–1984), Australian politician, barrister and raconteur
- Allen Fairhall (1909–2006), politician and Member of the Parliament of Australia for the Division of Paterson
- Brett Finch (1981–), rugby league player and sportscaster
- Robert Finch (1956–), rugby league player
- Michael Scott Fletcher (1868–1947), Methodist minister, foundation master of Wesley College, University of Sydney
- Allan Grice (1942–), Motor racing driver, two-time winner of the Bathurst 1000
- Ben Hall (1837–1865), bushranger
- Isaac Heeney (1996–), AFL player
- Harry Holgate (1933–1997), politician, 36th Premier of Tasmania
- Matt Jobson (1980–), rugby league player
- Ellis Lawrie (1907–1978), politician
- Frank Liddell (1862–1939), politician
- Edmund Lonsdale (1843–1913), politician
- Charles Macartney (1886–1958), cricketer
- Christian Mansell (2005–), racing driver
- Jack Marx (1965–), journalist and author
- Charles Stuart Mein (1841–1890), barrister, politician and judge
- Jim Morgan (1943–2005), rugby league player
- George Moore (1820–1916), cricketer, born in England, but lived most of his live in Maitland
- Milton Morris (1924–2019), NSW state politician known for his role in the Supercar scare of 1972
- Mollie McNutt (1885–1919), poet
- Sir Arthur William Morrow (1903–1977), physician
- Nell (1975–), artist
- Ziggy Niszczot (1955–), rugby league player
- Walter O'Hearn (1890–1950), politician
- Margaret Olley (1923–2011), painter
- Marc Ongley (1952–), classical guitarist
- Noel Pidding (1927–2013), rugby league player
- Baker Russell (1837–1911), Australian-born British Army officer
- Henry Chamberlain Russell (1836–1907), astronomer and meteorologist
- David Trewhella (1962–), rugby league player
- William Samuel Viner (1881–1933), Australian chess master
- Walter Lawry Waterhouse (1887–1969), agricultural scientist
- Alasdair Webster (1934–), politician
- Mary Dunstan Wilson (1870–1959), Sister of Charity, educator
- Caitlin Wood (1997–), racing driver
- Leonora Wray (1886–1979), golfer
- Peter Wynn (1957–), rugby league player
- Hudson Young (1998–), rugby league player

== See also ==
- Maitland, South Australia
- South Maitland coalfields
