= St Mary's the Virgin Anglican Church =

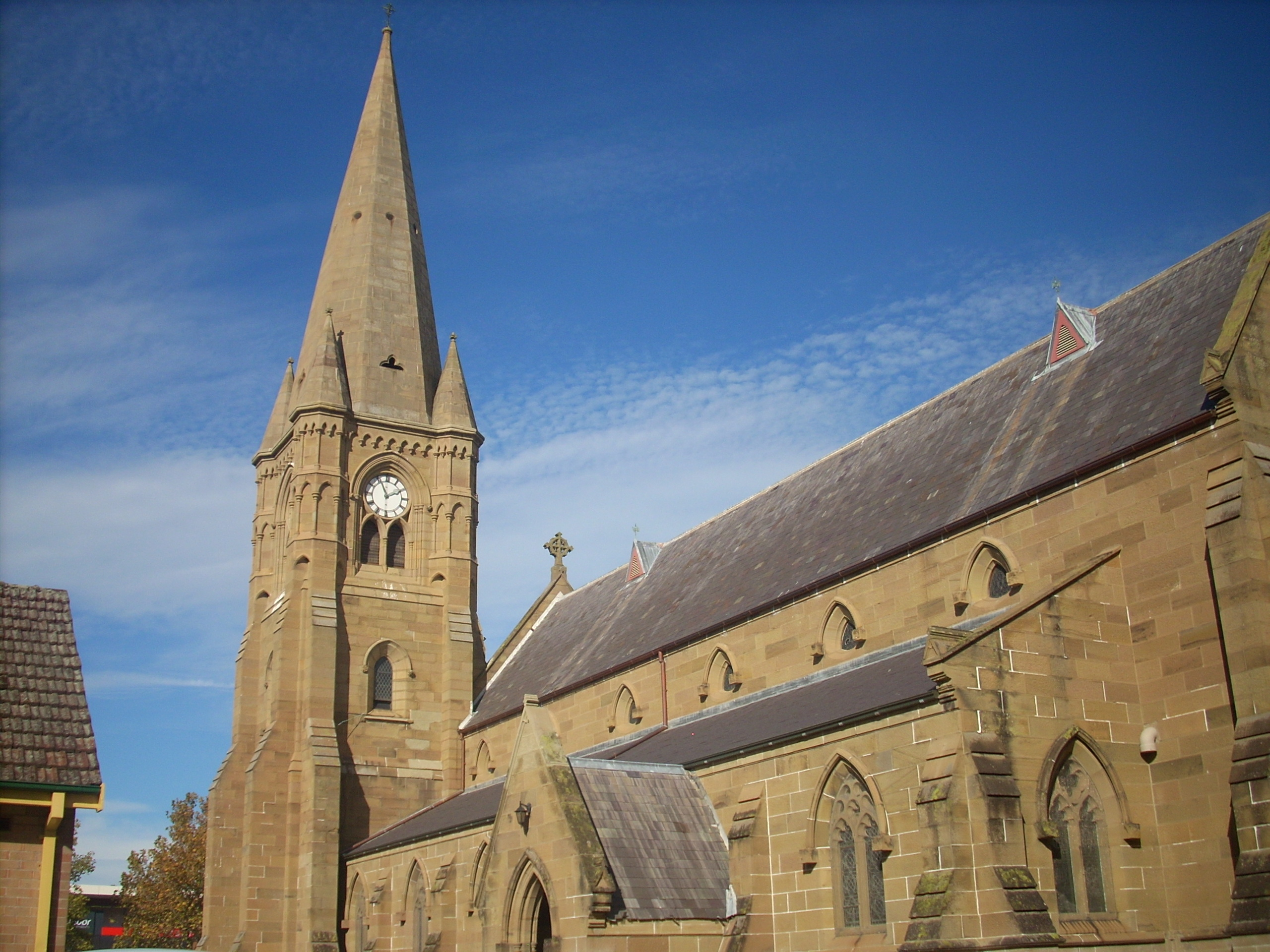
- St Mary's Church, pictured in 2011

- Location in New South Wales
- 32°44′06″S 151°33′08″E
- Location: 66 Church Street, Maitland, City of Maitland, New South Wales
- Country: Australia
- Denomination: Anglican
- Website: newcastleanglican.org.au/your-church/maitland/

History
- Status: Church
- Founded: 7 September 1860
- Dedication: Saint Mary

Architecture
- Functional status: Active
- Architect: Edmund Blacket
- Architectural type: Victorian Gothic
- Years built: 1860–1867

Administration
- Diocese: Newcastle

Clergy
- Rector: Paul West

New South Wales Heritage Register
- Official name: St. Mary's the Virgin Anglican Church & Rectory
- Type: State heritage (built)
- Designated: 2 April 1999
- Reference no.: 403
- Type: Church
- Category: Religion

St Mary's the Virgin Anglican Church is a heritage-listed Anglican church at 66 Church Street, Maitland, City of Maitland, New South Wales, Australia. It was designed by Edmund Blacket. It was added to the New South Wales State Heritage Register on 2 April 1999.

== History ==
The church was designed by Edmund Blacket to replace an earlier 1843 church that Blacket found would be too costly to enlarge and repair. Blacket's design provided for a nave, chancel, north and south aisles, two porches, vestry, tower and spire, seating 700 parishioners. The foundation stone was laid on 7 September 1860. It finally opened for services on 18 July 1867. The bell tower was completed in 1887.

In June 2006, $119,464 funding was approved for restoring and re-pointing of the church tower to prevent further water damage; repairs to damaged stonework; and restoration of the tower's pinnacles and their finials.

== Description ==
The church is in the Victorian Gothic style, with a slender stone tower, tracery windows, lower roof over aisles (clerestory to nave), with excellent stone detailing and craftsmanship.

The brick two-storey rectory has a slate hipped roof, bracketed eaves, cast iron columns, balustrade and frieze.

The grounds have important landscape value with mature trees.

== Heritage listing ==
St Mary's the Virgin Anglican Church was listed on the New South Wales State Heritage Register on 2 April 1999 having satisfied the following criteria.

The place is important in demonstrating the course, or pattern, of cultural or natural history in New South Wales.

The church is significant for its role as a tangible record of the Anglican Church in urban and community development

The place is important in demonstrating aesthetic characteristics and/or a high degree of creative or technical achievement in New South Wales.

The Church is the finest example of High Victorian Gothic with a magnificent stone spire and excellent stone tracery, set in spacious grounds, with the spire being a major landmark in town and the surrounding area. The rectory is a rare example of large Italianate house in central Maitland. Set in spacious grounds.

The place has strong or special association with a particular community or cultural group in New South Wales for social, cultural or spiritual reasons.

The church is significant for its ongoing role as a focus for members of Anglican Church and for associated social activities.

The place possesses uncommon, rare or endangered aspects of the cultural or natural history of New South Wales.

This item has rarity value.

The place is important in demonstrating the principal characteristics of a class of cultural or natural places/environments in New South Wales.

This item has representative value.
