= Nell =

Nell is a traditional nickname for Eleanor. Nell is the name of:

== People ==
=== Given name ===
- Nell (artist) (born 1975), Australian artist
- Nell Angloma (born 2006), French basketball player
- Nell Arthur (1837–1880), American First Lady
- Nell Ballantyne (1898–1959), Scottish actress
- Nell V. Beeby, Indian-born American nurse
- Nell Beecham, British LGBTQ rights activist
- Nell Benjamin, dramatist and composer
- Nell Blaine (1922–1996), American painter
- Nell Bryden (born 1977), American singer
- Nell Campbell, Australian actor and singer
- Nell Carter (1948–2003), American singer and actress
- Nell Craig, American actress
- Nell Dorr (1838‐1988), American photographer
- Nell Dunn (born 1936), English playwright, screenwriter, and author
- Nell Fisher (born 2011), British-New Zealand actress
- Nell Fortner (born 1959), American women's college basketball coach
- Nell Tiger Free (born 1999), English actress
- Nell Freudenberger (born 1975), American novelist
- Nell Gwyn (1650–1687), mistress of King Charles II of England
- Nell Hall Williams (1933–2021), American quilter
- Nell Jackson (1929–1988), American Olympic sprinter and track coach
- Nell Jongeneel, New Zealand football player
- Nell Kenney, British suffragist
- Nell Leyshon, British writer
- Nell Martindale (1891–1976), American physical educator
- Nell McAndrew (born 1973), English glamour model
- Nell McCafferty (born 1944), Irish journalist, playwright, civil rights campaigner, and feminist
- Nell Mescal (born 2003), Irish singer-songwriter
- Nell Miller, British sports player
- Nell Minow, American film reviewer and writer
- Nell I. Mondy (1921–2005), American biochemist
- Nell Morris-Dalton, Australian rules footballer
- Nell Murbarger (1909–1991), American writer
- Nell O'Day (1909–1989), American equestrian and actress
- Nell Rankin (1924–2005), American opera singer
- Nell Regan, poet and writer
- Nell Reymond, French actress and singer
- Eleanor Harriett (Nell) Rivett (1883–1972), Australian missionary
- Nell Rojas (born 1987), American athlete and coach
- Nell Ryan (1881–1959), Irish nationalist
- Nell Scott, American politician
- Nell Scovell (born 1986), American screenwriter
- Nell Shipman (1892–1970), Canadian actress and screenwriter
- Nell Sigland, Norwegian heavy metal singer
- Nell Sinton (1910–1997), American painter
- Nell Soto, American politician
- Nell Tangeman, American opera singer
- Nell Tenhaaf, Canadian artist, teacher, and writer
- Nell Theobald, American actress
- Nell Truman, British tennis player
- Nell Verlaque, American Actress and singer
- Nell Walden, Swedish painter, art collector, and writer
- Nell W. Walker (1888–1962), American politician from West Virginia
- Nell Williams (born 1998), English actress
- Nell Zink, American writer and media director
- Nell Znamierowski, American textile artist

=== Surname ===
- Jeremy Nell (born 1979), South African cartoonist and blogger
- William Cooper Nell (1816–1874), American abolitionist and author

== Fictional characters ==
- Nell the kitchen wench, in Shakespeare's play Comedy of Errors
- Nell, short for Nellodee, the protagonist in Neal Stephenson's The Diamond Age
- Nell Fairfax, from the British soap opera Emmerdale
- Nell Fenwick, from the "Dudley Do-Right" segments of The Rocky and Bullwinkle Show television series
- Nell Jones, a special agent from the television series NCIS: Los Angeles
- Nell Kellty, the protagonist in the play Idioglossia
- Nell Mangel, from the Australian soap opera Neighbours
- Nell Ruggles, a superhuman in the comic book series Squadron Supreme
- Nell Trent, or Little Nell, heroine of Charles Dickens' The Old Curiosity Shop

== Other uses ==
- Nell (band), South Korean band
- Mitsubishi G3M, a Japanese WWII medium bomber codenamed "Nell"
- Nell (film), a 1994 film

== See also ==
- Nella
- Nelle
- Nelli
- Nelly (given name)
- Neil
