= Nell (disambiguation) =

Nell is a feminine given name and also a surname.

Nell may also refer to:

- Nell (artist) (born 1975), Australian artist
- Nell (band), a South Korean alternative rock band
- Nell (film), a 1994 drama starring Jodie Foster
- Nell, Kentucky, a small town in the United States
- Nell Island, in the Kwajalein Atoll of the Marshall Islands
- Never-Ending Language Learning, a semantic machine learning system
- "Nell", the Allied reporting name for the Japanese World War II Mitsubishi G3M bomber
- "Nell", the name of Robert Goddard's first successful liquid-fuel rocket

== See also ==
- Nell Gwyn (disambiguation)
- Nelle
