= Prüfer =

Prüfer (German for "examiner") is a German surname. Non-German language versions are Pruefer or Prufer. Notable people with these surnames include:

- Arthur Prüfer (1860–1944), German musicologist
- Clemens Prüfer (born 1997), German discus thrower, brother of Henning
- Cornelia Prüfer-Storcks (born 1956), German politician
- Curt Prüfer (1881–1959) German diplomat
- Gustav Franz Pruefer (1861–1951), American music instrument inventor
- Heinz Prüfer (1896–1934), German Jewish mathematician
- Henning Prüfer (born 1996), German discus thrower
- Kevin Prufer (born 1969), American poet, novelist, academic, editor, and essayist
- Thomas Prufer (1929–1993), American philosopher

== See also ==
- Jan Prüffer (1890–1959), Polish biologist
