= Znamierowski =

Znamierowski (feminine: Znamierowska) is a Polish surname. Notable people with the surname include:

- Alfred Znamierowski (1940–2019), Polish vexillologist, heraldist and journalist
- Czeslaw Znamierowski (1890–1977), Soviet Lithuanian painter
- Czesław Znamierowski (1888–1967), Polish philosopher, jurist and sociologist
- Nell Znamierowski (1931–2021), American textile artist
- Maria Znamierowska-Prüfferowa (1898–1990), Polish ethnographer
