= Kylie Kwong =

Australian chef

Kylie Kwong AM
- 鄺凱莉
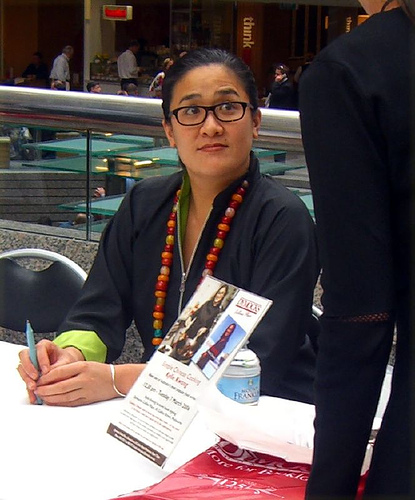
- Kwong at a book signing in March 2006
- Born: Kylie Jane Kwong; 31 October 1969 (age 57); Sydney, New South Wales, Australia
- Occupations: Chef, author, restaurateur, television presenter
- Partner: Nell
- Children: 1

Kylie Jane Kwong (born 31 October 1969) is an Australian television chef, author, television presenter and restaurateur.

== Early life and education ==
Kwong attended Epping North School and Cheltenham Girls High School in Sydney. As a third-generation Chinese Australian, she learned the fundamentals of Cantonese cooking by her mother's side. She undertook much of her apprenticeship at Neil Perry's Rockpool and Wockpool, and later at Restaurant Manfredi.

== Career ==
Kwong opened her first restaurant, Billy Kwong, in the Sydney suburb of Surry Hills. 'Billy' in the restaurant's name derives, not from the name of a family member, but from the partnership with Sydney celebrity chef Bill Granger under which the restaurant was founded. Kwong later became the sole owner of the restaurant under the original name.

In 2014 Kwong relocated the restaurant to larger premises at Potts Point. Billy Kwong Potts Point was co-owned with Sydney and Hong Kong chef and restaurateur Andrew Cibej and seismologist and businessman David King.

The restaurant made a commitment to use organic and biodynamic food: "We now use only organic and biodynamic fruit and vegetables, poultry, meat and noodles. All the soy sauces, sugar, vinegar and oils we flavour our food with are organic, and we serve Fair Trade tea, coffee and chocolate." The restaurant made this transition in 2005.

Kwong is quoted as saying "I wanted my work and social life to reflect my Buddhism. Offering my customers healthy, life-giving, precious food is the best way for me to help them. Whether it's my books, restaurant or TV show, I'll always ask, 'Is this sustainable? Is this about uplifting and elevating the energy rather than depleting?'".

Billy Kwong received the inaugural Sustainability Award in 2009 from the Sydney Morning Herald Good Food Guide, in recognition of Kwong's environmental initiatives, including the option for diners to donate to a renewable energy credits program, purchased from a wind farm in the Chinese province of Hebei. The restaurant serves only filtered Sydney tap water, offering no bottled water.

At a public lecture by the Dalai Lama on 3 December 2009 at the Sydney Entertainment Centre, Kwong acted as master of ceremonies.

On 1 October 2011, Kwong's first ever tableware range went on sale in Oxfam shops around Australia. The range, which includes a soup bowl and rice bowl with matching plates, soup spoon, teapot, teacup and coffee cup, is a joint project with Oxfam Australia and is hand-crafted by one of Oxfam's fair trade producer partners in Vietnam, Mai Vietnamese Handicrafts.

In 2019 Kwong announced the closure of her restaurant citing a desire for change in her fiftieth year.

In November 2019 Kwong was appointed Ambassador for food, culture and community for the newly revitalised South Eveleigh precinct. Formerly known as the Australian Technology Park, an established technology and innovation hub, the area was developed to include diverse office, retail, dining, wellness and cultural areas. Kwong's role is to encourage workers, visitors and the wider community to engage with the precinct through food, culture and community activation.

In 2020 Kylie Kwong participated in the 22nd Biennale of Sydney. Her original plan was to hold a behind-the-scenes event exploring "the concept of 'true nourishment' through preparing food, serving community, and sharing respect for the people, stories and places behind the food that we eat". As Ambassador for Food, Culture and Community for South Eveleigh and also as Ambassador for the Wayside Chapel events were planned to be held at the Wayside Chapel and at Eveleigh Green in South Eveleigh. With the onset of COVID-19 restrictions she refocussed on cooking and delivering weekly meals over two months as a gesture of support for seven community and health leaders. The essence of the project was captured in conversations with three of these leaders and documented under the title True Nourishment for the Biennale.

In May 2021 Kwong opened her own cafeteria-style dining venue, Lucky Kwong, in the precinct. The venue, named after the son she and her wife lost in 2012, was established with a focus on quality, ethically sourced ingredients and nourishing dishes. In June 2024 Lucky Kwong will close with Kwong to retire from being a restaurant proprietor.

=== Television and books ===
In 2003, Kylie Kwong: Cooking with Heart and Soul was published by Penguin Viking/ABC Books in October 2003 to coincide with her first TV series which was screened on the ABC at the same time. Her first cookbook Kylie Kwong: Recipes and Stories was published by Penguin in April 2003. The television series was screened both on the Australian ABC, but also on Foxtel, on the LifeStyle Channel, and on Discovery Home in the United States.

In late 2001, the LifeStyle Channel released a statement revealing that a second Kylie Kwong series would be released. The six part television series would be named Kylie Kwong: Simply Magic. This series was then televised in January 2006 on the LifeStyle Channel and later in 2006 on Discovery Home. A new Kylie Kwong book was released in 2006 under the name of Simple Chinese Cooking. The book aims to make Chinese cooking as easy as possible, with every recipe accompanied by a full-page colour photograph.

A third series to accompany her new book My China: Stories and Recipes from My Homeland will be shown on UKTV Food in Summer 2008.

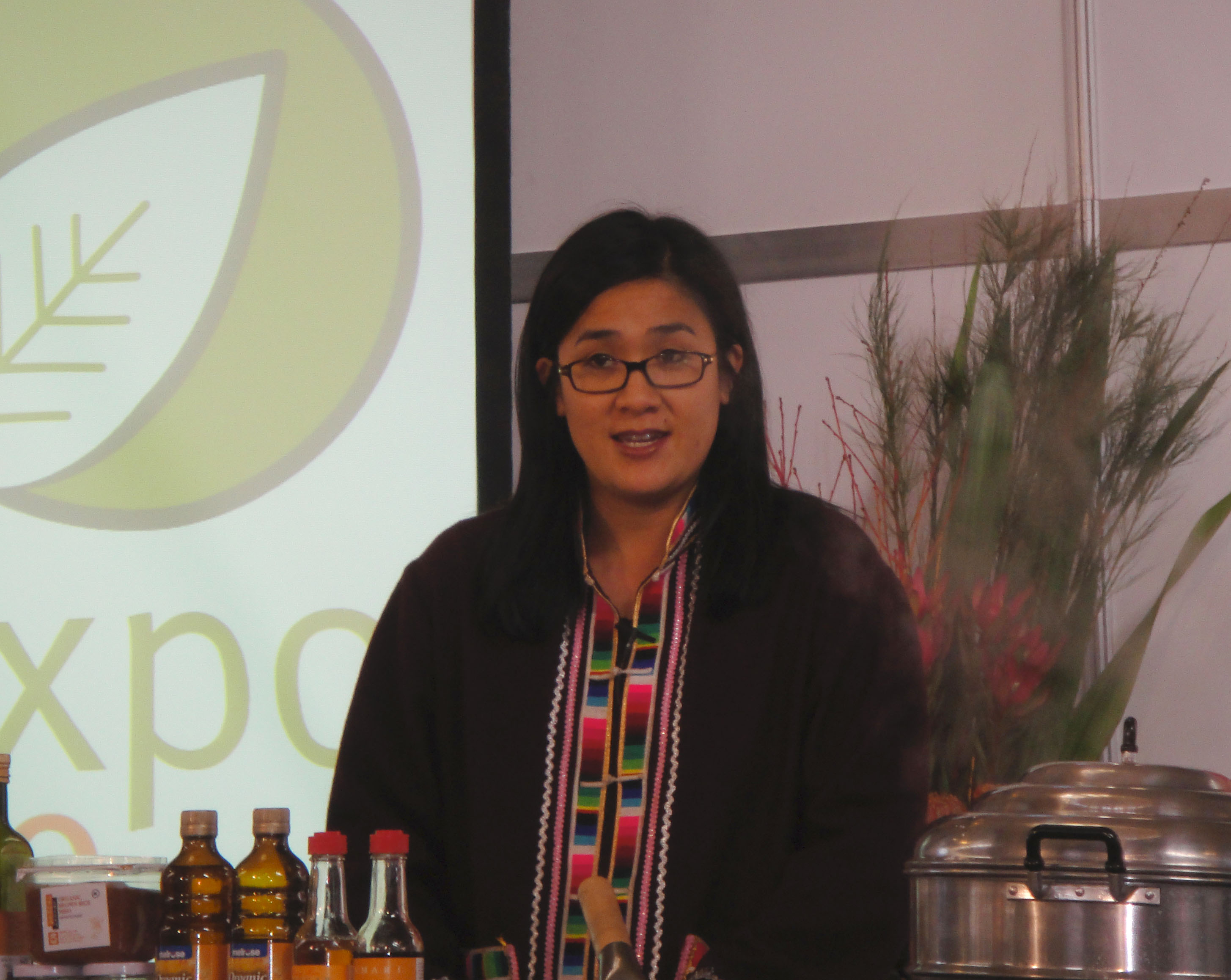
Kylie Kwong giving a public cooking demonstration, Organic Expo, July 2009

In 2012 she appeared as a guest chef in the fourth series of MasterChef Australia. She returned as a guest judge in the sixth series and guest mentor in the eighth series.

She appeared on Anh's Brush with Fame 17 July 2019.

== Personal life ==
Kwong's wife is Australian mononymous artist Nell. Kwong and Nell married on 17 March 2019.

Kwong was appointed Member of the Order of Australia (AM) in the 2023 Australia Day Honours for "significant service to the hospitality industry, and to the community".

== Summary of publications ==
To date, Kwong has released five books, all of which share her love of cooking and explore many different facets of Chinese culture and cuisine. In order of release, these include:

- Kylie Kwong: Recipes And Stories - 2003 - 184 pages. ISBN 978-0-670-91118-9
- Heart and Soul - 2003 - 204 pages. ISBN 978-0-670-04154-1
- Simple Chinese Cooking - 2007 - 313 pages. ISBN 978-0-670-03848-0
- My China: A Feast for All the Senses - 2007 - 482 pages. ISBN 978-0-670-01879-6
- My China: Stories and Recipes from My Homeland - 2008 - 496 pages. ISBN 978-0-00-727104-7
- Story in Growing up Asian in Australia - 2008

== See also ==
- Kwong Sue Duk, Kylie's great-grandfather.
