= Maria Racięcka =

Polish entomologist (1886–1954)

Dr. Maria Racięcka
- Born: November 18, 1886; Ciechanów
- Died: February 4, 1954 (aged 67); Warsaw
- Other name: Marja Racięcka
- Education: University of Poznań
- Occupation: entomologist
- Known for: study of Trichoptera

Dr. Maria Racięcka (1886-1954) was a Polish entomologist known for her work on Trichoptera (caddisflies).

== Biography ==
Racięcka was born on 18 November 1886 in Ciechanów, Masovian Voivodeship. Racięcka qualified as a teacher and wished to study further, but she was not wealthy and deferred pursuing her further education until 1919, when she enrolled as a mature student studying zoology at the Faculty of Mathematics and Natural Sciences of the University of Poznań. Racięcka achieved a Doctorate in 1929.

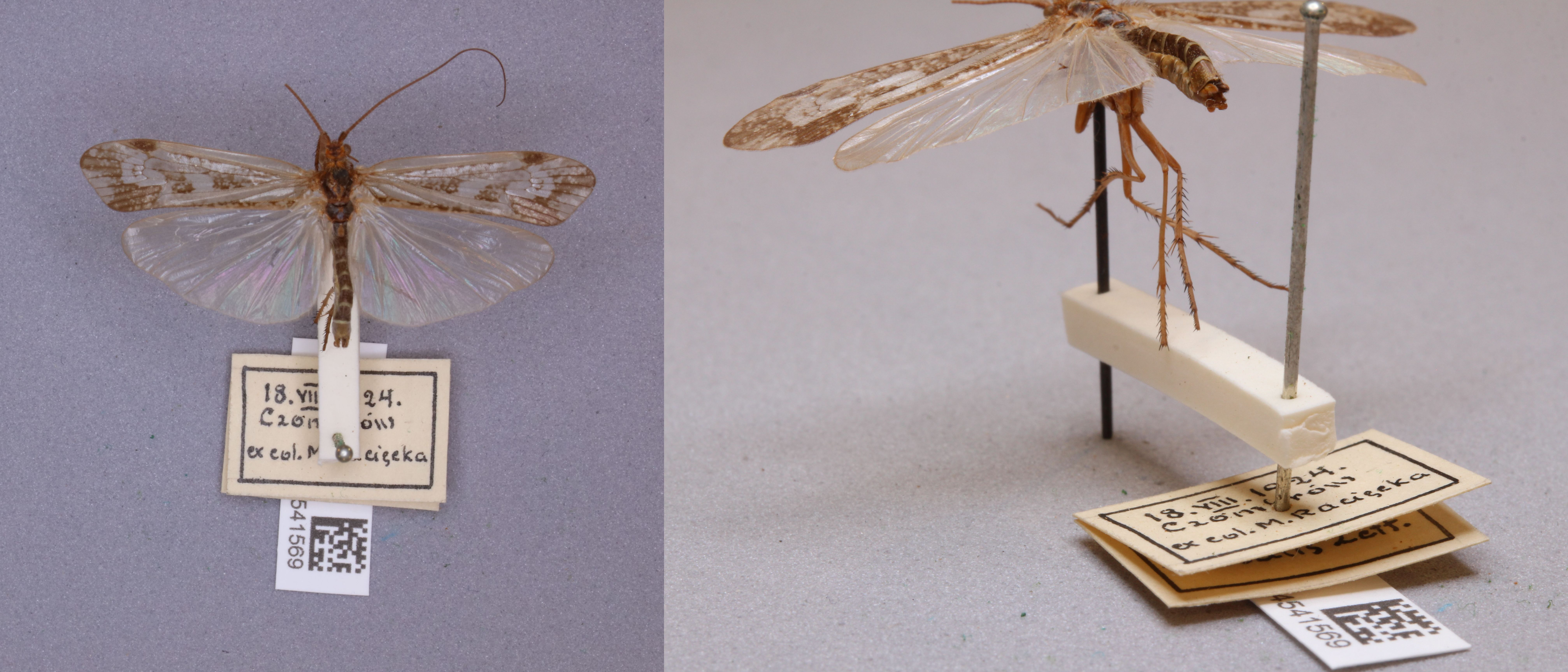
two views of a specimen of Limnephilus borealis (Zetterstedt, 1840), a caddisfly collected by Maria Racięcka in 1924 at Czombrów (then in Poland, now in Belarus) NHMUK014541569.

Circa 1930, Racięcka was working as a Zoologist at Wilno University (then in the Wilno Voivodeship, Poland - now part of Vilnius, Lithuania). Racięcka acted as an assistant to Jan Prüffer.

In 1937 Racięcka described a Hydroptilidae species new to science, Allotrichia vilnesis, collected in the area around Wilno. In her paper she thanked Martin Mosely of the Natural History Museum, London for confirming her diagnosis of the species.

Racięcka died suddenly on 4 February 1954 at Warsaw while on a research trip to the State Zoological Museum, possibly as a delayed result of hitting her head after falling from a tram a few days previously. At the time of her death Racięcka was preparing a monograph about Polish caddisflies.

== Select publications ==
1925: Poczwarka Neuronia phalaenoides L. [On the Nymph of Neuronia phalaenoides L.] Travaux de la Société des Sciences et des Lettres de Vilno: Classe des Sciences mathématiques et naturelles: volume II, issue 7, pages 7–8.

1931: Chróściki (Trichoptera) północno-wschodniej Polski ze szczególnym uwzględnieniem obszaru wileńsko-trockiego [The Trichoptera of N. E. Poland especially of the neighborhood of Vilno and Trokil.] Travaux de la Société des Sciences et des Lettres de Vilno: Classe des Sciences mathématiques et naturelles: volume VI, issue 20: pages 1–34

1934: Przyczynek do znajomości Chrościków (Trichoptera) zem Polski [A Contribution to the Knowledge of the Trichoptera from Poland]: Entomologiczne: tome 12: 1-4: pages 17–27

1937: Nowy gatunek chróścika z rodziny Hydroptilidae [A new species of Caddisfly from the family Hydroptilidae]: Annales Musei zoologici Polonici: volume XI: issue 29: pages 477–481.
