= Nelle =

Nelle is a given name, and may refer to:

- Nelle Benson, fictional character from General Hospital, an American soap opera on the ABC network
- Nelle G. Burger (1869-1957), American temperance leader
- Nelle A. Coley (1909–1999), a noted educator from Greensboro, NC
- Nelle Richmond Eberhart (1871–1944), American librettist, poet, and teacher
- Nelle Isabel Law (1914–1990), generally known as Nel Law, Australian artist, poet and diarist
- Nelle Harper Lee (1926–2016), or Harper Lee, American novelist widely known for To Kill a Mockingbird
- Nelle Lee, Brisbane-based actress, producer and writer best known for theatre work
- Nelle Morton (1905–1987), American theologian, professor, feminist activist, and civil rights leader
- Nelle Nugent (born 1939), American independent Broadway producer
- Nelle Peters (1884–1974), American architect
- Nelle Porter, fictional character on the Fox television show Ally McBeal
- Rhoda-Nelle Rader (1920–2016), wife of Edward Nassour, the American film producer, businessman, and special effects animator
- Nelle Wilson Reagan (1883–1962), the mother of United States President Ronald Reagan and his older brother Neil "Moon" Reagan
- Nelle Scanlan MBE (1882–1968), New Zealand journalist and novelist
- Nelle Brooke Stull of Elyria, Ohio, founder and president of the Widows' & Widowers' Club
- Lou Nelle Sutton (1905–1994), businesswoman and former state representative from San Antonio, Texas

== Fictional Characters ==
- Nelle, a well-known Koppaite veterinarian in Pikmin 4

== See also ==
- Van Nelle Factory on the Schie in Rotterdam, a prime example of the International Style based upon constructivist architecture
- Nelle Brown Memorial Library, 166 West Liberty Street, Lyons, Georgia, a branch of the Ohoopee Regional Library System
- Lange Nelle Lighthouse, lighthouse in Oostende, Flanders, Belgium
- Nele
- Nell
- Nelles
