= James B. Dudley High School =

Historic school building in North Carolina, United States

Location
- 1200 Lincoln St. Greensboro, North Carolina 27401; United States; 36°03′36″N 79°45′52″W

Information
- School type: Public high school secondary school
- Founded: 1929 (97 years ago)
- School district: Guilford County Schools
- CEEB code: 341605
- Principal: Marcus Gause
- Teaching staff: 91.50 (FTE)
- Gender: Co-educational
- Enrollment: 1,465 (2023–2024)
- Student to teacher ratio: 16.01
- Schedule type: Block
- Schedule: Traditional (Late August–Early June)
- Hours in school day: Monday–Friday, 9:15 A.M.–4:20 P.M.
- Campus type: Suburban
- Colors: Blue and Gold
- Athletics: NCHSAA 6A
- Athletics conference: Metro 6A/7A
- Sports: 15 varsity teams (7 male, 8 female)
- Mascot: Panther
- Nickname: Panthers
- Website: dudleyhs.gcsnc.com
- James Benson Dudley Senior High School and Gymnasium
- U.S. National Register of Historic Places
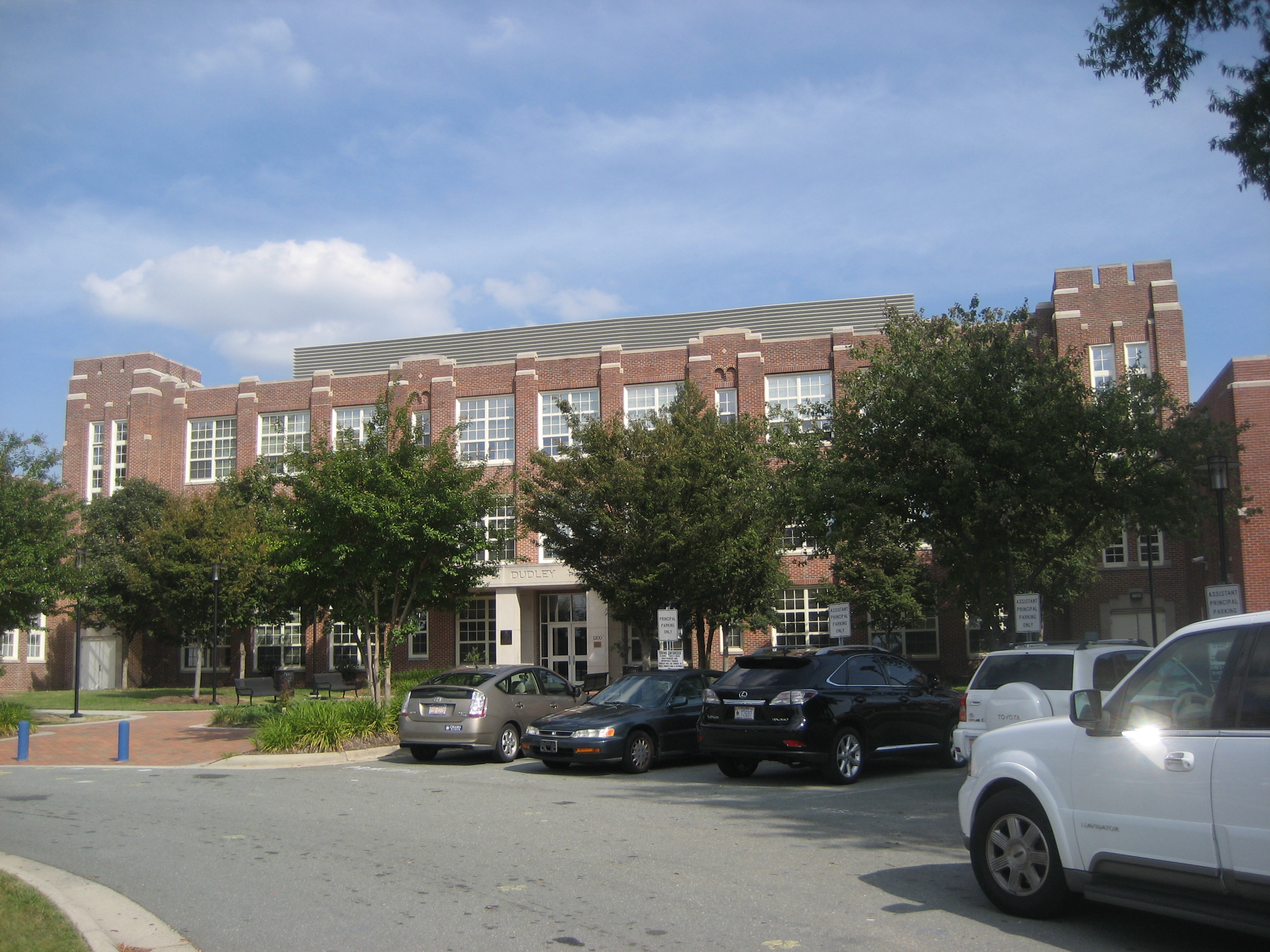
- James Benson Dudley Senior High School, September 2012

- Location within North Carolina Location within the United States
- Location: 1200 Lincoln St., Greensboro, North Carolina
- Area: 3 acres (1.2 ha)
- Built: 1929, 1936, 1959
- Architects: Hartmann, Charles C.; et.al.
- Architectural style: Classical Revival, Late Gothic Revival
- MPS: Greensboro MPS
- NRHP reference No.: 03000302
- Added to NRHP: April 11, 2003

James Benson Dudley High School is a four-year public high school located in Guilford County in the city of Greensboro, North Carolina. Dudley High School was founded in 1929 as the first black high school in Guilford County, in a school system segregated by law. The school was named for James Benson Dudley (1859–1925).

== History ==
The high school building was designed by architect Charles C. Hartmann and built in 1929. James B. Dudley Senior High School is a three-story, U-shaped, brick building with Classical Revival and Collegiate Gothic design elements. It has a one-story slightly projecting entrance portico with Doric order columns added in the mid-1970s, a stepped parapet, and crenellated stair towers. The gymnasium was attached in 1936. A separate brick gymnasium building was constructed in 1959.

James Benson Dudley Senior High School and Gymnasium was listed on the National Register of Historic Places in 2003.

The school was central to the 1969 Greensboro uprising when school officials refused to recognize the validity of a write-in candidate for student council, allegedly due to his activism in the Black Power movement. In 1971 through desegregation, Dudley's student population integrated.

Today, the make-up of the school consists of a low diversity student enrollment with a predominantly African-American population. Dudley has a traditional education program as well as the Dudley Science, Math, and Technology Academy magnet program. The Science, Math, and Technology Academy provides high-caliber students a strong college preparatory background, which emphasizes mathematics and science along with sufficient writing, research, and technological skills. During their senior year, Dudley Academy Students attend classes on college campuses. Dudley won two back-to-back football rings. The school colors are blue and gold. Dudley High School has an Advance Vehicle Technology (AVT) Team that competes in an international competition called the Shell Eco Marathon.

== Notable people ==
=== Alumni ===
- Elreta Melton Alexander-Ralston (class of 1934), first African-American judge in North Carolina, first black woman to graduate from Columbia Law School
- Tom Alston, first African-American Major League Baseball player for the St. Louis Cardinals
- David Amerson (class of 2010), football player for Oakland Raiders
- Clarence Avant, music executive, known as "Godfather of Black Music", left Dudley in junior year (1947)
- Ezell A. Blair, Jr. (class of 1959), African American civil rights activist, one of Greensboro Four
- Joey Cheek (class of 1997), former speed skater and inline speed skater, gold medalist in men's 500 metres at 2006 Winter Olympics
- King Virgil Cheek (class of 1955), former President of Shaw University and Morgan State University
- Brett Claywell (class of 1996), actor, played Tim Smith on WB/CW series One Tree Hill and Kyle Lewis on ABC soap opera One Life to Live
- Jeff Davis, former NFL player, Tampa Bay Buccaneers 1982–87 and Clemson, 1982 Orange Bowl champion; inducted into College Football Hall of Fame in 2007
- Marques Douglas (class of 1995), former NFL player for San Francisco 49ers
- Beverly M. Earle (class of 1961), first black woman to represent Mecklenburg County in North Carolina House of Representatives
- Will Graves, Maccabi Haifa basketball player
- Clarence Grier (class of 1983), college basketball player
- P. J. Hairston, North Carolina basketball player, transferred to Hargrave Military Academy for his senior year
- Brendan Haywood (class of 1997), NBA player for Charlotte Bobcats
- Hendon Hooker (class of 2017), NFL quarterback
- Lou Hudson (class of 1962), NBA player for St. Louis Hawks, 6-time All-Star
- Yvonne Johnson (class of 1960), first African-American mayor of Greensboro
- Debra L. Lee (class of 1972), President and CEO of BET Holdings, Inc.
- Joyce Martin Dixon (class of 1952), businesswoman and philanthropist
- Jerry Gantt, former NFL and CFL player
- Mac McCain (class of 2017), defensive back for the Detroit Lions
- Emmanuel Moseley (class of 2014), defensive back for the Detroit Lions
- Natalie Murdock, politician
- Fred Neal (class of 1958), guard for demonstration basketball team Harlem Globetrotters and noted dribbler
- Kenny Okoro, football player
- Payton Page (class of 2021), NFL defensive tackle for the New York Jets
- DeMario Pressley (class of 2004), former NFL defensive tackle
- Lynnae Quick (class of 2001), NASA scientist specializing in planetary geophysics and ocean worlds; first African American awarded the Harold C. Urey Prize; namesake for asteroid 37349Lynnaequick
- David L. Richmond (class of 1959), civil rights activist, one of Greensboro Four
- Charlie Sanders (class of 1964), NFL tight end for Detroit Lions, 2007 inductee into Pro Football Hall of Fame
- Jessie Carney Smith, librarian and educator
- George Simkins, Jr. (class of 1940), civil rights activist, NAACP president
- Barbara Weathers (class of 1981), soul singer (with Atlantic Starr)

=== Faculty ===
- Nelle A. Coley, famed educator and civil rights activist, taught English at James B. Dudley High School for over thirty years.

== See also ==
- List of high schools in North Carolina
