= Pauline Nguyen =

Australian author and restaurateur

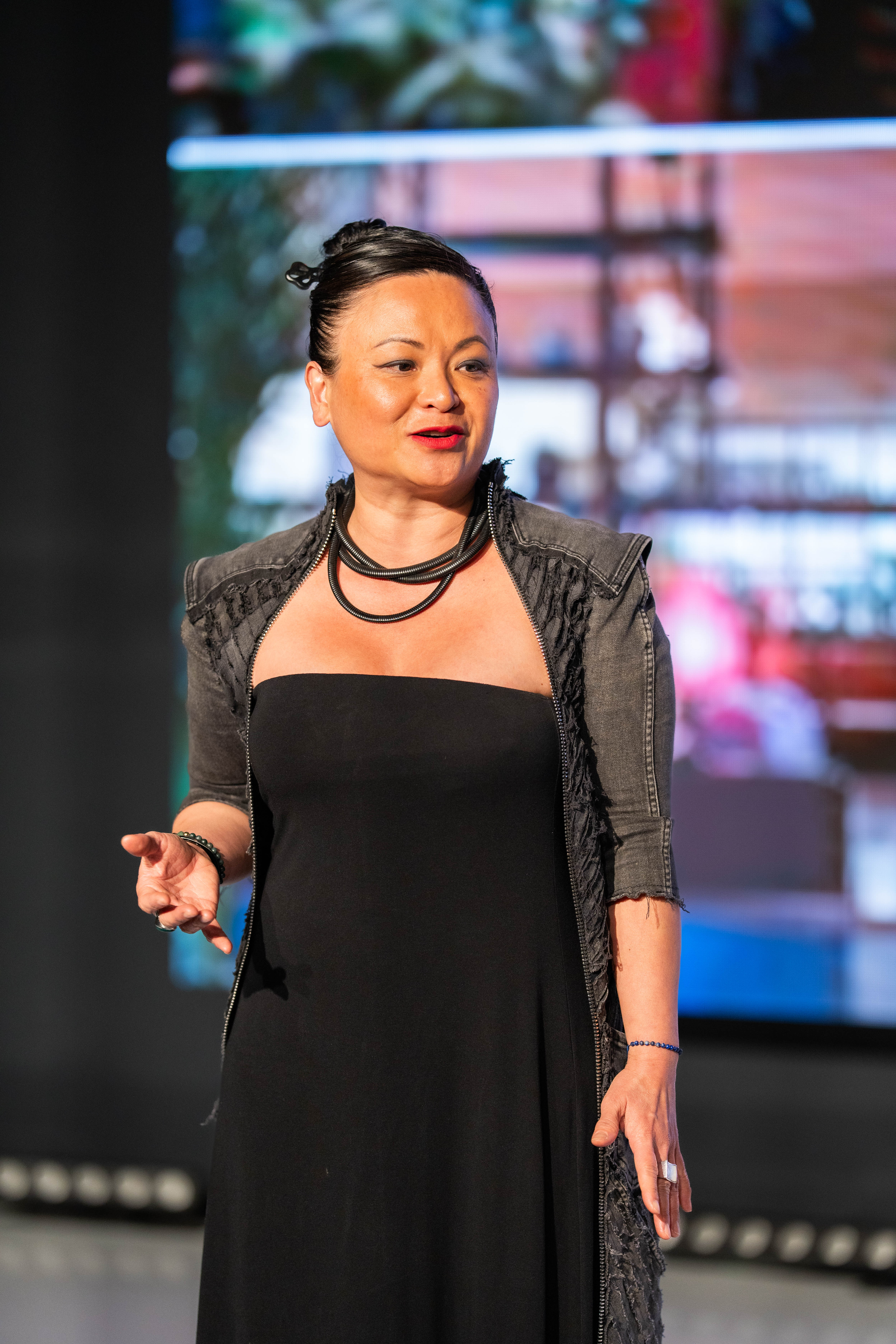
- Born: Vietnam
- Citizenship: Australian
- Occupations: Author, restaurateur
- Notable work: Secrets of the Red Lantern
- Website: pauline-nguyen.com

Pauline Nguyen is an Australian author and restaurateur.

Nguyen was born in Vietnam. Upon the communist takeover of Saigon in 1975, her father decided to evacuate his family from Vietnam. They embarked on a perilous sea voyage in 1977, eventually finding refuge in a Thai refugee camp. After a year, they were granted asylum in Australia by the Fraser government in 1978.

In 2002, Nguyen partnered with her brother Luke Nguyen, to open the Red Lantern restaurant in Sydney. As an author, she has written several publications. Nguyen authored Secrets of the Red Lantern, a memoir that combines her family's story with traditional Vietnamese recipes. The book was awarded for Newcomer of the Year and Biography of the Year at the Australian Book Industry Awards in 2008. She also wrote "The Way of the Spiritual Entrepreneur," a 2019 Australian Business Book Award winner for Best Entrepreneurship and Small Business.

In 2020, Nguyen took part in the third season of the Australian documentary series Filthy Rich and Homeless.

In 2025, Forbes Australia reported that Nguyen coaches Australian executives and entrepreneurs affected by burnout through a program integrating business, spiritual, and psychological methods to restore purpose and balance.

== Publications ==
- Nguyen, Pauline; Nguyen, Luke; Jensen, Mark (2008). Secrets of the Red Lantern: stories and Vietnamese recipes from the heart. Kansas City, Mo: Andrews McMeel. ISBN 978-0-7407-7743-1. OCLC 221154328.
- Nguyen, Pauline (2008). "The Courage of Soldiers". In Pung, Alice (ed.). Growing up Asian in Australia. Melbourne: Black. ISBN 978-1-86395-191-3.
- Nguyen, Pauline (2009). "Born in Vietnam, made in Australia". In Schultz, Julianne (ed.). Stories for today. Griffith review Fiction issue. South Brisbane: Griffith Univ. ISBN 978-1-921520-86-0.
- Nguyen, Pauline (2008). Secrets of the Red Lantern: Stories and Vietnamese Recipes from the Heart. Andrews McMeel Publishing. ISBN 978-0740777431.
