= Luke Nguyen's Vietnam =

- Presented by: Luke Nguyen
- Country of origin: Australia
- No. of series: 2
- No. of episodes: 20 (10 per season)

Production
- Running time: 30 minutes

Original release
- Network: SBS One

Related
- Luke Nguyen's Greater Mekong

Luke Nguyen's Vietnam is an Australian television series first screened on SBS One in 2010. The series follows chef, Luke Nguyen, as he tours Vietnam seeking culinary delights and adventure. It is regularly broadcast on Good Food, a UK food-orientated TV channel.

== Luke Nguyen ==
Luke Nguyen (born 1978) is a Vietnamese Australian chef, best known as the host of television series Luke Nguyen's Vietnam. The series is a food documentary, in which he travels through Vietnam, cooking in the ad hoc manner of the street vendors in the country, usually preparing the dish on the footpaths. He appeared on MasterChef Australia (season 2) as a guest chef.

He is also the owner of Red Lantern restaurant in Surry Hills, Sydney and is the author of a number of cook books.

He's a current judge of MasterChef Vietnam.

== Season One ==
- Episode 1: Saigon
- Episode 2: Saigon
- Episode 3: Mekong delta
- Episode 4: Phu Quoc Island
- Episode 5: Phan thiet and mui ne
- Episode 6: Dalat
- Episode 7: Nha trang
- Episode 8: Quy nhon
- Episode 9: Hoi an
- Episode 10: Hoi an 2

== Season Two ==
- Episode 1: Hue
- Episode 2: Vinh
- Episode 3: Ninh Binh
- Episode 4: Hanoi
- Episode 5: Greater Hanoi
- Episode 6: Sapa
- Episode 7: Sapa 2
- Episode 8: Bac Ha
- Episode 9: Halong Bay
- Episode 10: Mai Chau
