= Emmanuel Moseley =

American football player (born 1996)

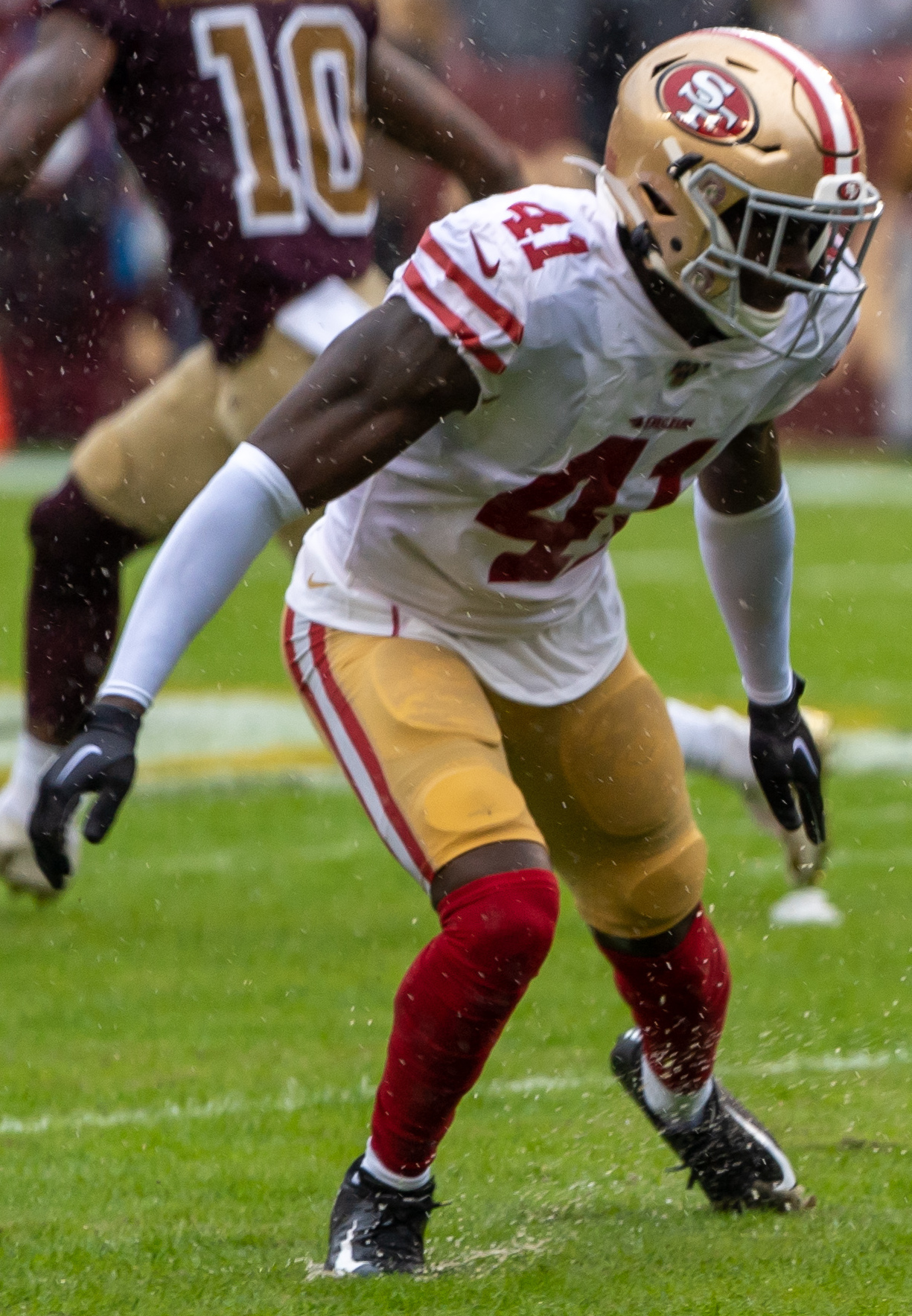
- Moseley with the San Francisco 49ers in 2019

Profile
- Position: Cornerback

Personal information
- Born: March 25, 1996 (age 30); Greensboro, North Carolina, U.S.
- Listed height: 5 ft 11 in (1.80 m)
- Listed weight: 195 lb (88 kg)

Career information
- High school: James B. Dudley (Greensboro)
- College: Tennessee (2014–2017)
- NFL draft: 2018: undrafted

Career history
- San Francisco 49ers (2018–2022); Detroit Lions (2023–2024)

Career NFL statistics as of 2024
- Total tackles: 162
- Fumble recoveries: 1
- Pass deflections: 33
- Interceptions: 4
- Defensive touchdowns: 1
- Stats at Pro Football Reference

Emmanuel LaMurel Moseley (born March 25, 1996) is an American former professional football player who was a cornerback in the National Football League (NFL). He played college football for the Tennessee Volunteers and was signed as an undrafted free agent by the San Francisco 49ers.

== Early life ==
Moseley attended and played high school football at James B. Dudley High School, where he played basketball and was a two-way starter at quarterback and cornerback in football. As a senior, Moseley passed for 1,370 yards, rushed for 1,443 yards and accounted for 47 total touchdowns at quarterback and recorded 28 tackles and four interceptions on defense as the Panthers went 15–0 and won the Class 4A State Title. Initially rated as a two-star recruit, originally Moseley committed to play college football for the Charlotte 49ers in the summer going into his senior year. He changed his commitment to the University of Tennessee following an offer from the school in September of his senior year.

== College career ==
Moseley played four seasons for the Volunteers, appearing in 51 games and starting 31. He served mostly as a reserve defensive back during his freshman season, playing in all 13 of Tennessee's games with two starts and making 18 tackles (two for loss) and finishing second on the team with six pass breakups. Moseley became a starter during his sophomore year, leading the team with 11 passes broken up with 27 tackles and picking off a pass in the 2016 Outback Bowl for the first interception of his career. As a junior, Moseley was the Vols fifth-leading tackler with 57 (3.5 for loss) while breaking up six passes. He recorded 38 tackles, two tackles for loss, seven pass breakups and an interception as a senior. Over the course of his collegiate career, Moseley accumulated 142 tackles, 9.5 tackles for loss with 31 pass deflections and two interceptions.

== Professional career ==
Pre-draft measurables
Height	Weight	Arm length	Hand span	Wingspan	40-yard dash	10-yard split	20-yard split	20-yard shuttle	Three-cone drill	Vertical jump	Broad jump	Bench press
5 ft 11 1/8 in (1.81 m)	190 lb (86 kg)	31 1/2 in (0.80 m)	9 1/8 in (0.23 m)	6 ft 3 3/4 in (1.92 m)	4.42 s	1.50 s	2.59 s	4.03 s	6.84 s	38.5 in (0.98 m)	10 ft 6 in (3.20 m)	21 reps
All values from Pro Day

=== San Francisco 49ers ===
==== 2018 season ====
Although originally projected to be a late-round pick in the 2018 NFL draft, Moseley went unselected. He signed with the San Francisco 49ers as an undrafted free agent on April 28, 2018.

On September 2, Moseley was cut by the 49ers at the end of the preseason, and subsequently re-signed to the team's practice squad. On October 19, San Francisco increased Moseley's contract from $7,600 per week to $28,235, after another team was rumored to be interested in signing him.

Moseley was promoted to the 49ers active roster on November 1. He made his NFL debut the same night in a 34–3 win against the Oakland Raiders, playing three snaps and notching one tackle on special teams. However, he injured his shoulder during the game and was placed on injured reserve the following day.

==== 2019 season ====
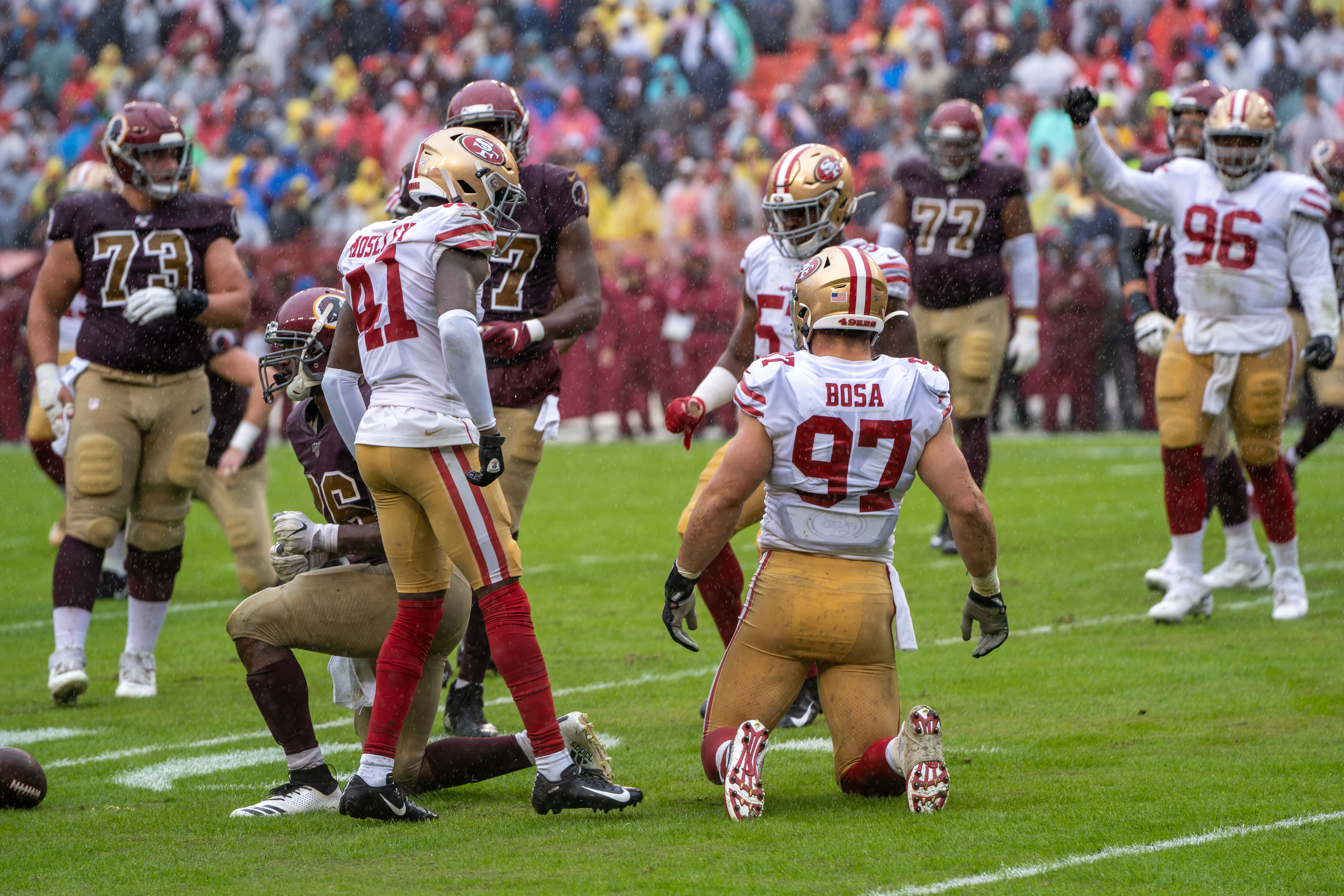
Moseley in a game against the Washington Redskins

Moseley made his first NFL start during Week 5 against the Cleveland Browns. He notably deflected a pass in the end zone, and the 49ers won 31–3. Three weeks later, against the Carolina Panthers, he recorded his first NFL career interception by picking off Kyle Allen in a 51–13 victory. He finished the regular season with 50 tackles, eight passes defensed and an interception, playing in 16 games with nine starts.

In the NFC Conference Championship against the Green Bay Packers, Moseley intercepted a pass thrown by Aaron Rodgers during the 37–20 victory. In Super Bowl LIV, he recorded five tackles and a pass deflection in a 31–20 loss to the Kansas City Chiefs. He played in all three of the 49ers' playoff games, starting in two. He recorded 14 tackles, with four passes defended and an interception.

==== 2020 season ====
On March 5, 2020, the 49ers assigned Moseley a one-year, $585,000 exclusive-rights free agent tender. He signed the contract on July 28. In Week 1, against the Arizona Cardinals, Moseley recorded a team-high 15 tackles (10 solo) during a 24–20 loss. In Week 7, against the New England Patriots, Moseley recorded his first interception of the season off a pass thrown by Cam Newton in a 33–6 win. In the 2020 season, he finished with 47 total tackles (34 solo) and one interception in 12 games and nine starts.

==== 2021 season ====
On March 15, 2021, Moseley signed a two-year, $10.1 million contract extension with the 49ers. He suffered a high-ankle sprain in Week 13 against the Seattle Seahawks, and was placed on injured reserve on December 11. Moseley was activated on January 8, 2022. He went on to play in a Week 18 win against the Los Angeles Rams the following day, recording his first (and only) interception of the season. He subsequently started in the next three postseason games, where the 49ers' Super Bowl run ended in an NFC Conference Championship loss to the Rams. He finished the season starting in 14 games, with 65 combined tackles (54 solo), 1 interception, 11 pass deflections and 1 fumble recovery.

==== 2022 season ====
In Week 5, against the Panthers, Moseley recorded a 41-yard pick six but suffered a season-ending torn left ACL. He was placed on injured reserve on October 15, 2022.

=== Detroit Lions ===
On March 16, 2023, Moseley signed a one-year contract with the Detroit Lions. Still recovering from his injury sustained the prior season, he was placed on the physically unable to perform list on August 2. In Week 5 of the 2023 season, against the Panthers, Moseley returned to play, but suffered a season-ending ACL tear in his right knee.

On March 5, 2024, Moseley signed a one-year contract extension with the Lions. On August 6, it was announced that Moseley had suffered a torn pectoral muscle. He began the season on injured reserve, and was activated on November 23.
