= Nell Reymond =

French actress and singer

Nell Reymond (1 August 1940 in Le Brassus – 20 December 2015 in Paris) was a French theatre, cinema and television actress and singer.

== Life ==
Nell Raymond studied acting at the Conservatoire National Supérieur d'Art Dramatique de Paris with Pierre Bertin. She made her debut at the Théâtre Moderne as Éléna in Uncle Vanya by Anton Chekhov (1860–1904).

Reymond has appeared in theatre under the direction of Claude Chabrol, Sacha Pitoeff, Nicolas Bataille, Jean-Pierre Miquel, Jean Rougerie (in L'Etoile au Front by Raymond Roussel), Pierre Lamy, Pierre Bertin, Roger Mollien, Gérard Vergès, Marcel Cuvelier, Mario Franceschi (in La Mégère apprivoisée, La Locandiera and Mangeront-ils?) and with Guy Moign. In television, Reymond worked with directors Roger Kahane, Pierre Gautherin, René Lucot, Jean Caseneuve, Colette Thiriet, Henri Polage, Paul Siegrist, Philippe Ducrest and Jean Henin, among others.

Reymond belonged to the ensemble of the Théâtre de la Huchette from 1982, which was considered her favourite stage. She worked there with Nicolas Bataille (1926–2008) (Offenbach, tu connais?, Les Mystères de la Révolution and Lautrec sur la butte) and performed in La Cantatrice Chauve and La Leçon by Eugène Ionesco, among others, as well as under the direction of Guy Moign (La Danseuse du crépuscule by Claudette Lawrence).

Reymond was married to Guy Moign. She founded two theatre companies with him, La Compagnie du Solilesse and the Union des Villes de Bretagne pour la Création Artistique.

Reymond also performed as a singer, for example at the Théâtre de la Huchette in Les Atours de Nell. She also regularly gave song and chanson recitals.

She died in Paris on 20 December 2015. The funeral service took place on 28 December 2015 in the crematorium of the Père-Lachaise cemetery.

== Theatre roles ==
- William Shakespeare: Catarina in The Taming of the Shrew
- Pierre Corneille: L'infante in Le Cid
- Pierre Corneille: Camille in Horace
- Molière: Elvire in Don Juan
- Carlo Goldoni: Mirandolina in La Locandiera
- Victor Hugo: Zineb the Witch in Mangeront-ils?
- Alfred de Musset: The Muse in Les Nuits
- Alexandre Dumas fils: Marguerite Gautier in La Dame aux Camélias
- Anton Chekhov: Elena in Uncle Vanya
- Raymond Roussel: Genevieve in L'Etoile au Front
- Pêr-Jakez Helias (1914–1995): Yseult in Yseult seconde
- Pierre Gripari: The Prostitute in Vie et Naissance de Pop
- Nicolas Bataille (1926–2008) und Ornella Volta (1927–2020): Yvette Guilbert - Cha-U-Kao - Eugénie Buffet in Lautrec sur la Butte
- Paol Keïneg: Dahut in Dahut
- Pierre Lamy: The Comedienne in Ma tête à couper

== Filmography ==
- 1967: Les habits noirs (TV series, 12 episodes)
- 2012–2013: La Minute Vieille, TV series, 61 episodes)
- 2016: Solange et les vivants, Direction: Ina Mihalache
