= Growing Up Asian in Australia =

Book edited by Alice Pung

Growing up Asian in Australia is an anthology of short stories, essays, poetry, interviews, and comic art edited by Melbourne author and lawyer Alice Pung and published by Black Inc publishing in 2008. It is the first in the Growing up in Australia series.

== About the book ==
The book includes accounts of growing up as Asians in Australia through creative fiction and non-fiction, as well as profiles of Asian-Australians in the public eye in 2008. Contributors include established authors such as film director Tony Ayres, Academy Award winner Shaun Tan, and award-winning writer Simone Lazaroo. Also included are television personalities such as Jenny Kee, Annette Shun Wah, Kylie Kwong, Benjamin Law, Waleed Aly, Anh Do, and other writers of Asian heritage. The book predates the rise in celebrity Asian Australian chefs such as Adam Liaw and Poh Ling Yieu.

There are over 50 contributors in the collection and its success led to Black Inc expanding its Growing Up series which now includes Growing Up Aboriginal, Growing Up Disabled, Growing Up Queer, and Growing Up African in Australia. The book was launched on 24 May 2008, at the as part of the Sydney Writers' Festival.

The discourse of "Asians" in Australia, at the time the book was published, is similar to that in America and usually refers to of South East and North East Asian background such as Chinese, Vietnamese, Japanese or Koreans. However, in this anthology, the term "Asian" extends to diasporas from the Indian-Ocean rim, including those from South Asian countries which is in line with the discourse of "Asian" in the United Kingdom.

In 2017, Pung published the original introduction to the book in the arts journal Peril, stating that she was unable to publish it in 2008 as it was too hard hitting for Australian readers at the time. She wrote, "was told by a trusted adviser who had decades of experience in the book publishing industry, that this type of heavy introduction might not make people want to pick up the book at Borders. She was absolutely right. Academics and students might be interested in the history of Asian-Australians, but we as a popular culture are perhaps not ready."

Since its publication, Pung has discussed the books relevance a decade on from its first publication in a podcast with Benjamin Law who said that even in 2020, most people would struggle to name five Asian-Australians in the public eye.

== Book Structure ==
=== Introduction ===
Pung introduces each piece in the book and explains the structure of the book.

=== ‘Strine’ ===
Amy Choi – "The Relative Adventures of Learning My Language"

Sunil Badami – "Sticks and Stones and Such-‐Like"

Tom Cho – "Learning English"

Ivy Tseng – "Chinese Lessons"

=== ‘Pioneers’ ===
Ken Chau – "The Early Settlers" (Poetry)

Ken Chau – "The Terrorists" (Poetry)

Francis Lee – "The Upside-‐Down Year"

Thao Nguyen The Water Buffalo

Christopher Cyrill – "The Ganges and its Tributaries"

Simon Tong – "The Beat of a Different Drum"

=== ‘Battlers’ ===
Hop Dac – "Pigs from home"

Annette Shun Wah –"Spiderbait"

Lily Chan – "Take me Away, Please"

Kevin Lai & Matt Huynh – "ABC Supermarket" (Comic Format)

=== ‘Mates’ ===
Aditi Gouvernel – "Wei-‐Lei and Me"

Oliver Phommavanh – "Hot and Spicy"

Ray Wing-‐Lun – "Lessons from my school years"

Tanveer Ahmed – "Exotic Rissole"

=== ‘The Folks’ ===
Vanessa Woods – "Perfect Chinese Children"

Simone Lazaroo – "The Asian Disease"

Rudi Soman – "Crackers"

Oanh Thi Tran – "Conversations with my parents"

Bon-‐Wai Chou – "The Year of the Rooster"

Mia Francis – "Are you different?"

=== ‘The Clan’ ===
Benjamin Law – "Tourism"

Ken Chau – "The Family Tree" (Poetry)

Ken Chau – "The Firstborn" (Poetry)

Diem Vo – "Family Life"

Ken Chan – "Quarrel"

HaiHa Le – "Ginseng Tea and a Pair of Thongs"

=== ‘Legends’ ===
Phillip Tang – "Teenage Dreamers"

Shalini Akhil – "Destiny"

Cindy Pan – "Dancing Lessons"

Chin Shen – "Papa Bear"

Glenn Lieu & Matt Huynh – "A New Challenger" (Comic Format)

=== ‘The Hots’ ===
Benjamin Law – "Towards Manhood"

Chi Vu – "The Lover in the Fish Sauce"

Xerxes Matza – "The Embarrassments of the Gods"

Lian Low – "My First Kiss"

Jenny Kee – "A Big Life"

=== ‘UnAustralian?’ ===
Uyen Loewald – "Be Good, Little Migrants" (Poetry)

Leanne Hall – "How to be Japanese"

Tony Ayres – "Silence"

James Chong – "Anzac Day"

Mei Yen Chua – "Special Menu"

Michelle Law – "A Call to Arms"

Joo-Inn Chew – "Chinese Dancing, Bendigo Style"

=== ‘Tall Poppies’ ===
Interviews with high-profile Australians including Shaun Tan and Waleed Aly.

=== ‘Leaving Home’ ===
Diana Nguyen – "Five ways to disappoint your Vietnamese mother"

Pauline Nguyen – "The Courage of Soldiers"

Paul Nguyen – "You Can’t Choose Your Memories"

Emily J. Sun – "These are the photographs we take"

=== ‘Homecoming’ ===
Kylie Kwong – "My China"

Blossom Beeby – "The Face in the Mirror"

Jacqui Larkin – "Baked Beans and Burnt Toast"

Sim Shen – "Hanoi and Other Homes"

== Growing up Series ==
After the publication of Growing up Asian in Australia, Black Inc publishing published:

- Growing up in Australia (2021)
- Growing up Aboriginal in Australia (2018), edited by Anita Heiss
- Growing up Queer in Australia (2019), edited by Benjamin Law
- Growing up African in Australia (2019), edited by Maxine Beneba Clarke
- Growing up Disabled in Australia (2021), edited by Carly Findlay
- Growing up Country in Australia (2022), edited by Rick Morton
