= Kwong Sue Duk =

Chinese-Australian herbalist

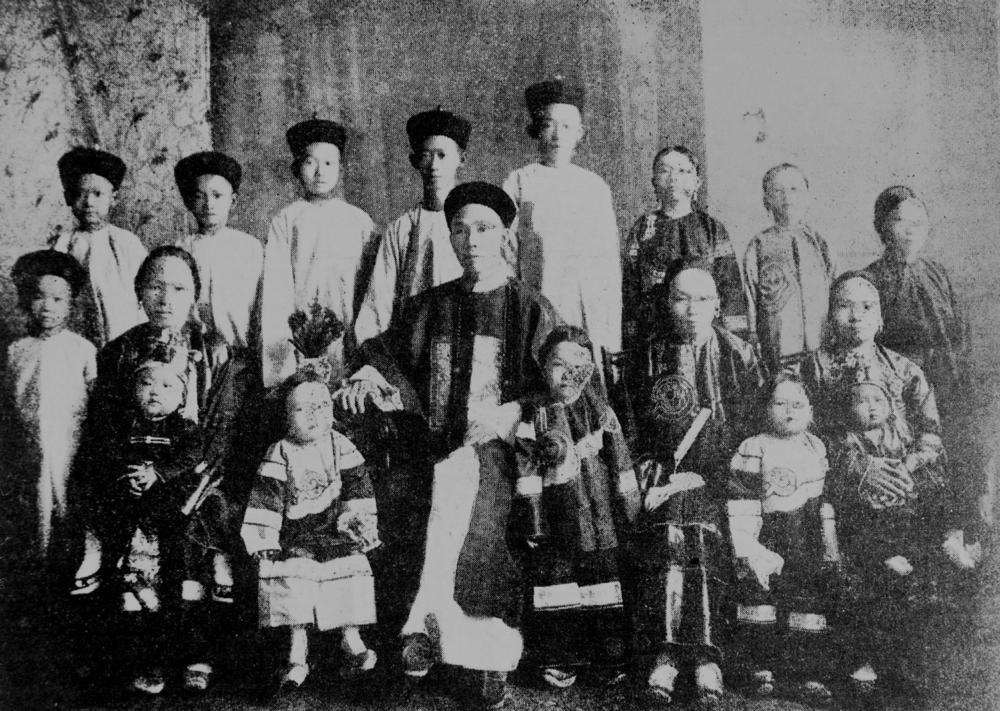
- Kwong Sue Duk with his three wives and fourteen children, Cairns, 1904
- Born: September 4, 1853; Guangdong Province, China
- Died: 17 February 1929; Townsville, Queensland, Australia
- Other names: Kwong See Tek (鄺仕德)
- Occupations: Herbalist, merchant, miner
- Known for: Founding Sun Mow Loong; building Sue Wah Chin Building; pioneering Chinese herbal medicine in Australia
- Spouse(s): Gee An Gow, Chun Ngor Gwei, Yuen Yuk Lau, Wong Kwei Far
- Children: 22 biological, 2 adopted
- Relatives: Kylie Kwong (great-granddaughter); Adam Yee (great-grandson); Daniel Cheong (great-great-grandson)

Kwong Sue Duk, also known as Kwong See Tek, (鄺仕德) (4 September 1853 – 17 February 1929) was a Chinese Australian herbalist, merchant, and miner.

== Early life ==
Kwong Sue Duk was born in Guangdong Province, China, in 1853. In his teens, he travelled to the Californian gold rush where he made a modest fortune mining for gold. He returned home to Toishan, China, and embarked on an education in Traditional Chinese medicine.

== Immigration to Australia ==
In 1874, Kwong Sue Duk married his first of four wives, Gee An Gow. In 1875, after the birth of his first son, Kwong Kong Sing, Kwong settled in Cooktown, Queensland, Australia, gateway to the Far North Queensland gold rushes.

== Career ==
In 1882, Kwong returned from China to settle in Southport, Northern Territory. Operating under his business name, Sun Mow Loong, he eventually established a successful general trade store and real estate enterprise. He was well respected and influential amongst the Chinese and European communities and was consulted over many matters concerning the Chinese.

In 1884, Kwong Sue Duk married his second of four wives, Chun Ngor Gwei, and obtained his naturalisation certificate in Australia. In 1885, Kwong Sue Duk moved to Palmerston (early Darwin) and in March 1887 he met and married his third of four wives, Yuen Yuk Lau. In 1888, he built the famous Sue Wah Chin Building, originally known as Stone House.

In 1889 he returned to China and brought out his first wife and three children to Palmerston. In 1897, a tropical cyclone damaged much of Palmerston, including Kwong's group of rental properties. His first wife had difficulty adjusting to the harsh conditions, and in 1898 he travelled with her to China where she chose to remain with her four children.

In 1899, Kwong met and married his fourth wife, Wong Kwei Far, and returned with her to Palmerston. However, the damage of the cyclone and the generally depressed state of the Northern Territory economy left Kwong in a poor financial situation. He became a citizen in 1889.

In 1902 the family set up a store and business in Cairns, Queensland where he sold mostly Chinese goods. In the back of the store he had an office where he dispensed Chinese herbal remedies.

In 1910 he returned from Hong Kong to settle in Townsville, Queensland, and in 1913 most of the family followed. Kwong established another successful Chinese herbal medicine practice in Little Flinders Street.

In 1917, Kwong made another major move to Melbourne, Victoria (Australia). He continued his herbal medicine practice in Melbourne and country Victoria, including the townships of Ballarat and Bendigo.

== Later life ==
In 1927, he retired to Townsville where he continued with his herbal medicine practice until he died at the age of 76 on 17 February 1929.

Over his lifetime, Kwong Sue Duk fathered 22 children and adopted two children with his four wives. As of 2006, over 800 descendants in eleven countries trace their lineage from Kwong Sue Duk. Kylie Kwong is his great-granddaughter. Melbourne-based composer Adam Yee his great-grandson. The Kwong Sue Duk Foundation arranges regular family reunions. Daniel Cheong is his great-great-grandson, son of Brett 'Boss' Cheong.

== See also ==
- Kwong family name.
- Kylie Kwong, great-granddaughter.

== References and external links ==
- The History of Chinese Business In Queensland - Chronological Overview a digitised timeline featuring the main events that happened in China and during the life of Kwong Sue Duk. By Rutian Mi, 2019 Queensland Business Leaders Hall of Fame Fellow.
- The History of the Chinese Business history of Queensland blog post by Rutian Mi, 2019 Queensland Business Leaders Hall of Fame Fellow.
- Kwong Sue Duk: a man of family, (Narrator Rosalie Hiah; written and directed by Warren Lee Long; Editor, Ron Donnelly, c1996) digitised video available online at State Library of Queensland.
- Chinese History of Australian Federation entry on Kwong Sue Duk, by Rosalie Hiah, Kwong Sue Duk Foundation (June 2001).
- Papers of Kwong Sue Duk in the National Library of Australia.
- Images of Kwong Sue Duk and his family in the Chinese-Australian Historical Images in Australia database.
- Kylie Kwong and other descendants of the Kwong family interviewed by George Negus for the Australian Broadcasting Corporation's George Negus Tonight profiles.
- Senator Tchen's memorial to Ida Lee, youngest daughter to Kwong Sue Duk in Hansard, 24 September 2002 [long PDF, search for Kwong Sue Duk].
