= Luke Nguyen =

Australian chef (born 1978)

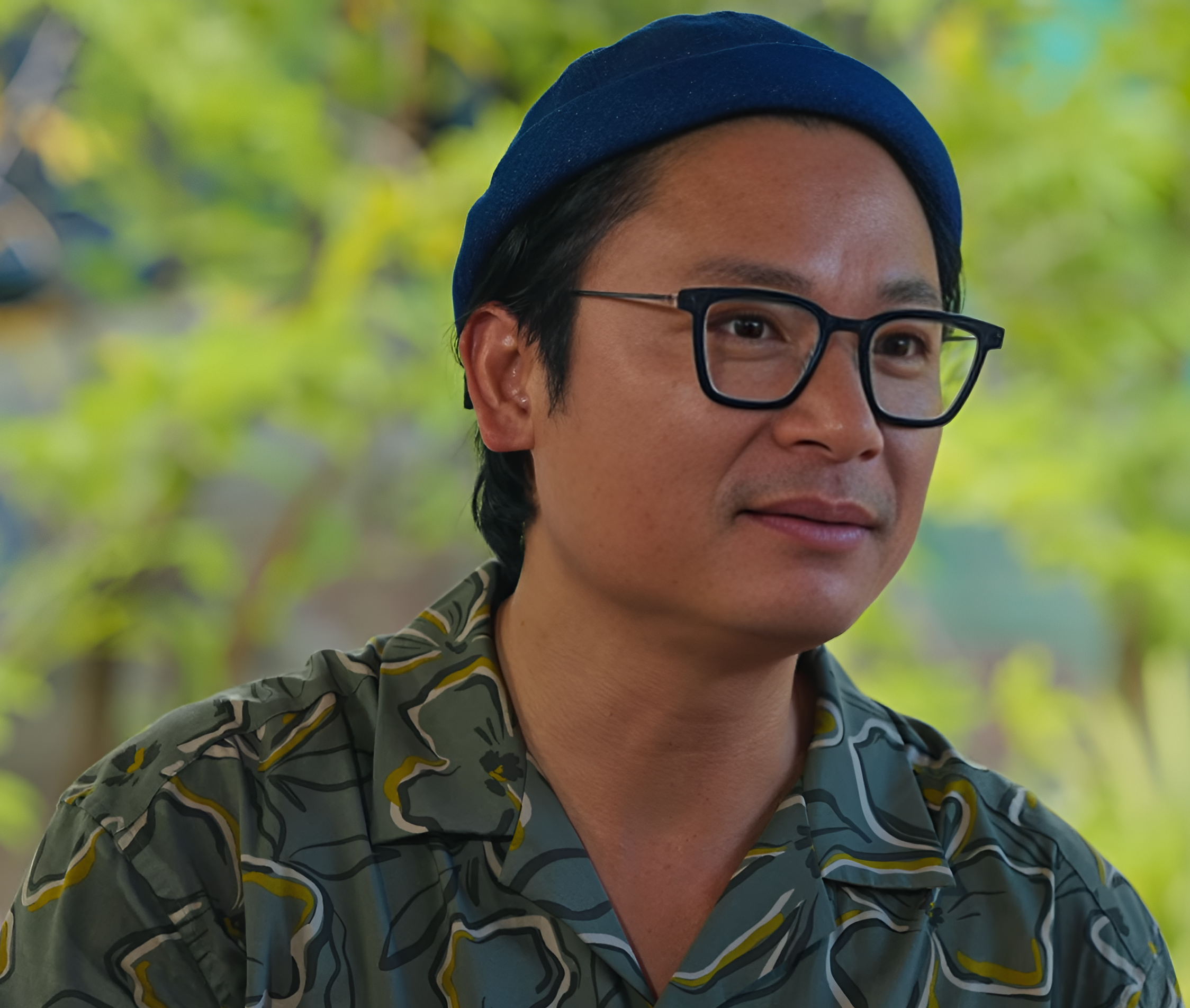
- Luke Nguyen in 2023
- Born: September 8, 1978 (age 48); Thailand
- Occupations: Chef, television presenter
- Spouse(s): Suzanna Boyd (separated); Lynne Nguyen
- Children: 2 (with Lynne Nguyen)

Luke Nguyen (Vietnamese: Luke Nguyễn; born 8 September 1978) is an Australian chef, restaurateur and television presenter of Vietnamese descent.

== Early life ==
In 1977, Luke Nguyen's family escaped Vietnam by boat to Thailand in search of a new life. Upon arriving in Thailand, they were sent to live in a Thai refugee camp. It was in one such camp that Luke was born. A year later, Luke's family journeyed to Australia and settled in Cabramatta, Sydney. Luke attended Patrician Brothers' College, Fairfield.

Luke's passion for food stemmed from his food-obsessed parents who owned the Pho Cay Du restaurant in Cabramatta for 15 years. He learned the art and fundamentals of Vietnamese cooking from his parents.

According to an interview he gave to Lifestyle Asia's Cindie Chan in 2016, Nguyen said: "Because I’ve always known I wanted to open up a restaurant and I grew up in a restaurant, I know how hard it is in terms of how much work: you don’t have weekends, you work through holidays and Christmas, so as soon as I finished high school I went travelling for one year, just myself and my backpack. I went to 14 different countries on my own".

== Restaurants ==
Nguyen is the owner of Red Lantern restaurant in Surry Hills, Sydney (in which he partnered with his sister Pauline Nguyen) and Vietnam House restaurant in Ho Chi Minh City. He is also the man behind the restaurant Fat Noodle situated in the Star Casino in Sydney, Botanic House in Sydney's Royal Botanic Gardens, and Star Casino in Brisbane.

== Television ==
In 2010, SBS released Nguyen's first television series, Luke Nguyen's Vietnam. The series is a food documentary in which Nguyen travels throughout Vietnam, cooking in the ad-hoc manner of the street vendors in the country, usually preparing the dish on the footpaths. He followed up the series with 2012's Luke Nguyen's Greater Mekong, which explored countries along the Mekong River. In 2014 he appeared in Luke Nguyen's France, which is an exploration of the French influence on Vietnamese cuisine.

His next series, the 10-episode Luke Nguyen's United Kingdom, first aired on 14 May 2015 with the London episode in which he toured the city's food markets with his brother, Lewis. His next series, the 8-episode Luke Nguyen's Street Food Asia, in which he explores street food in Ho Chi Minh City, Bangkok, Kuala Lumpur and Jakarta, first aired on 1 September 2016.

Nguyen has appeared multiple times on the competitive cooking show MasterChef Australia as a guest chef, including during season 2, season 3, season 8, season 15 and season 16. He also served as a judge on MasterChef Vietnam during its first 2 seasons.

In 2015, Nguyen appeared on a season 7 episode of the SBS genealogy series Who Do You Think You Are?, in which he learned of his previously unknown Hakka Chinese ancestry through his maternal grandfather, an immigrant from Guangdong. Though his mother had known about this for decades, for unspecified reasons she had hidden this information from Nguyen. The program also revealed information about the involvement of Nguyen's ancestors during the Indochina and Vietnam Wars.

In 2020, SBS aired Luke Nguyen’s Railway Vietnam, which was filmed in 10 locations over 35 days, often in challenging circumstances, and was in post-production for a further six months. The series was named Best Lifestyle Program at the Asian Television Awards in 2021.

In 2023, SBS aired Luke Nguyen’s India.

== Books ==
Nguyen is the author of five bestselling and award-winning cookbooks: Secrets Of The Red Lantern, The Songs of Sapa, Indochine, Luke Nguyen’s Greater Mekong, and The Food Of Vietnam. In an interview he gave to Lifestyle Asia he said, "With my cookbooks, it’s not just a recipe book where there is the recipe and a picture — there are stories behind the dishes that I share, so they are also educational and historical".

== Advertising ==
Nguyen has been the face for various advertising campaigns. He is the ambassador for Pork Australia, promoting pork in Australian households and restaurants.

== Philanthropy ==
In 2009, Luke Nguyen and his then-partner, Suzanna Boyd founded the Little Lantern Foundation in Hoi An, which gives disadvantaged youths an opportunity to undertake a hospitality training program in Little Lantern's operating hotel, restaurant and bar.

In an interview with Girl.com, Nguyen stated that, "Going back to Vietnam and visiting family members there and seeing where my parents used to live and meeting my [family] and just meeting kids, in general, I realised they've got it hard." He noted how easy Australians have it in comparison. He added, "When I go to Vietnam and see so many people, so many young kids struggling, they don't have enough money to have an education; it's not like Australia where the government gives you the chance to pay back your education costs- in other developing countries, it's not that easy. When I go to Vietnam and meet these kids that cannot afford to go to school and they're out there going through rubbish tins collecting plastic bottles or cans to sell and then give money to their parents it kills me." He reveals that this was the impetus for establishing the Little Lantern Foundation. He wanted to, "set up a little training school with a house and restaurant attached so people can do the theory in the training school and do the physical training in operating a business in the restaurant so they can have that real experience".

== Awards ==
Ngyuen was the youngest person inducted into the Sydney Morning Herald's Food Hall of Fame. He has also been awarded Chef of the Year in Vietnam, and his restaurant Red Lantern has won the Best Asian Restaurant award by the Restaurant and Catering Association many times.
