= Alice Pung =

Australian writer, editor and lawyer

Alice Pung OAM
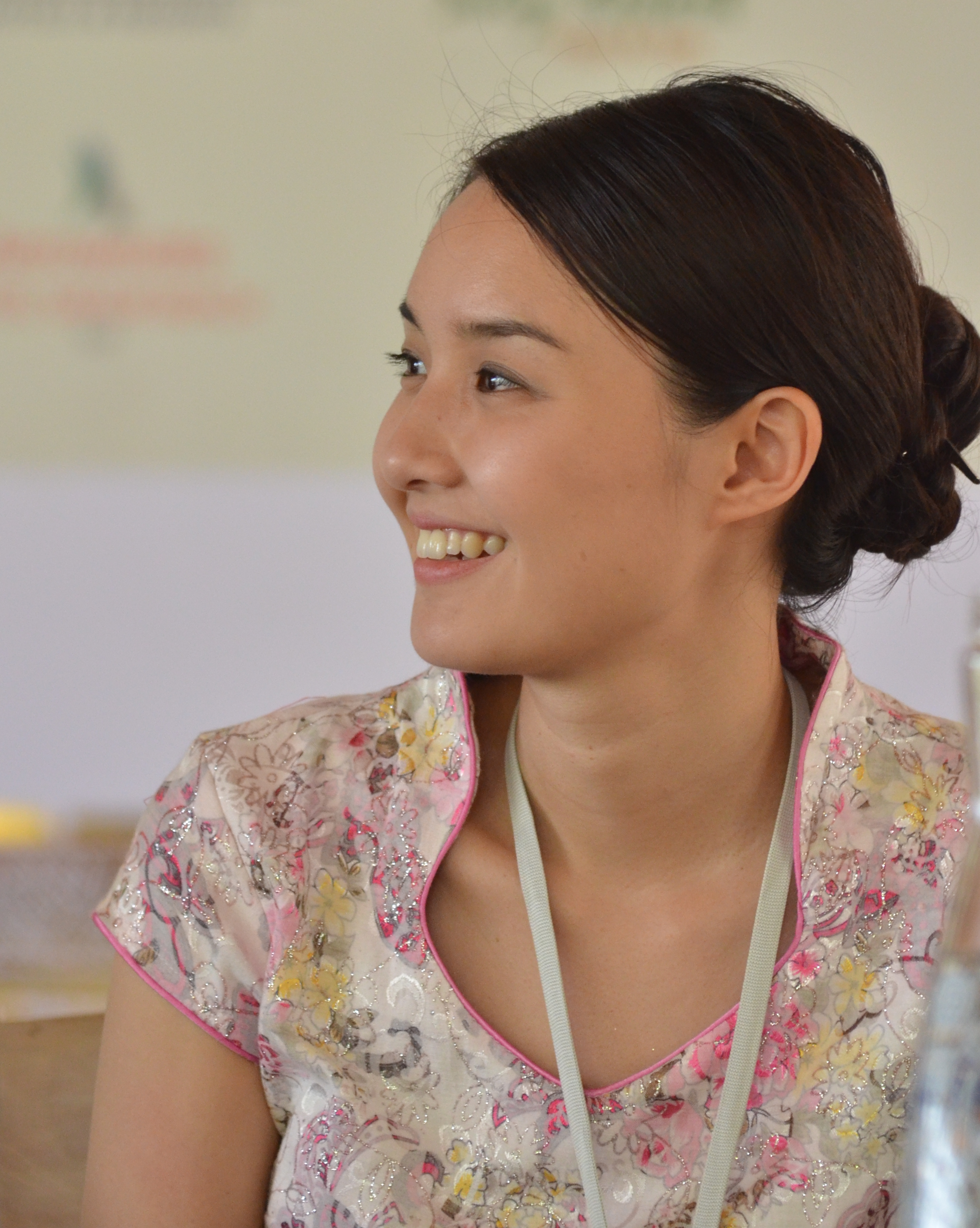
- Pung in 2012
- Born: 1981 (age 44–45); Footscray, Victoria, Australia
- Education: University of Melbourne
- Writing career
- Notable works: Growing Up Asian in Australia; Unpolished Gem
- Notable awards: Non-Fiction Prize in the 2011 Western Australian Book Awards; Australian Newcomer of the Year in the 2007 Australian Book Industry Awards
- Website: alicepung.net

Alice Pung OAM /pʊŋ/ (born 1981) is an Australian writer, editor and lawyer. Her books include the memoirs Unpolished Gem (2006), Her Father's Daughter (2011) and the novel Laurinda (2014).

Pung is a practising solicitor. She has also worked as an art instructor, independent school teacher at primary and secondary schools, and is Artist in Residence at Janet Clarke Hall at the University of Melbourne.

== Life ==
Pung was born to ethnic Teochew Chinese parents from Cambodia. Fleeing the killing fields of the Khmer Rouge, her parents sought asylum in Australia in 1980. Pung was named Alice after the protagonist of Alice in Wonderland, because her father saw Australia as a wonderland. She was born in the suburb of Footscray in Melbourne and grew up in Braybrook.

Pung attended five Melbourne schools, including the Catholic junior girls school Christ the King College in Braybrook (now the junior girls campus of Caroline Chisholm Catholic College), Penleigh and Essendon Grammar School, and Mac.Robertson Girls' High School. Pung studied law at the University of Melbourne and works as a legal analyst.

== Writing career ==
Pung's first book, Unpolished Gem, won the 2007 Newcomer of the Year Award in the Australian Book Industry Awards. Her follow-up memoir, Her Father's Daughter, was published in 2011.

Her first book for young adults, Laurinda, was published in 2014. It was adapted for an American audience in 2016, and a collection of high school students' stories inspired by the novel was published in 2016. Pung has also written the Marly books for the Our Australian Girl children's series.

Pung attended the International Writing Program at the University of Iowa as a resident in 2009. She is a regular writer for The Monthly on topics such as race discrimination, class, cultural stereotypes, and experiences of living in Melbourne, Victoria.

In November 2020, the Melbourne Theatre Company announced that it will adapt Pung's novel, Laurinda, for the stage.

== Awards and recognition ==
In the 2022 Australia Day Honours Pung was awarded the Medal of the Order of Australia for service to literature.

=== Unpolished Gem ===
- Winner of the Australian Newcomer of the Year award in the 2007 Australian Book Industry Awards
- Shortlisted in the Australian Biography of the Year and Australian Book of the Year in the 2007 Australian Book Industry Awards
- Shortlisted in the 2007 New South Wales Premier's Literary Awards
- Shortlisted in the 2007 Victorian Premier's Literary Awards
- Shortlisted in the 2007 The Age Book of the Year Awards
- Shortlisted for the 2006 Colin Roderick Award
- Shortlisted for the 2007 The Westfield/Waverley Library Award for Literature

=== Her Father's Daughter ===
- Winner of the Non-Fiction Prize in the 2011 Western Australian Book Awards
- Shortlisted in the 2012 Victorian Premier's Literary Awards
- Shortlisted in the 2012 NSW Premier's Literary Awards
- Shortlisted in the 2012 Queensland Literary Awards

=== Laurinda ===
- 2016 Ethel Turner Prize for Young People's Literature (NSW Premier's Literary Awards)

=== One Hundred Days ===
- Shortlisted for the 2022 Miles Franklin Award
- Shortlisted for the 2022 Voss Literary Prize

=== When Granny Came to Stay ===
- Shortlisted for the 2023 NSW Premier's Literary Award
- Shortlisted for the 2024 DANZ Children's Book Award

=== Millie Mak the Maker ===
- Shortlisted for the 2024 Prime Minister's Literary Award for Children's Literature

== Bibliography ==
=== Books ===
- Unpolished Gem. (Black Inc., 2006)
- Growing Up Asian in Australia (Black Inc., 2008) (editor)
- Her Father's Daughter. Black Inc. 2011.
- Laurinda (Penguin Australia, 2014) (published as Lucy and Linh in the United States, 2016)
- Our Australian Girl: Meet Marly: Our Australian Girl, illustrated by Lucia Masciullo (Puffin, 2015)
- Our Australian Girl: Marly's Business, illustrated by Lucia Masciullo (Puffin, 2015)
- Our Australian Girl: Marly and the Goat, illustrated by Lucia Masciullo (Puffin, 2015)
- Our Australian Girl: Marly Walks on the Moon, illustrated by Lucia Masciullo (Puffin, 2016)
- My First Lesson: Stories Inspired by Laurinda (2016)
- John Marsden: Writers on Writers (2017)
- In a Heartbeat: A #LoveOzYA Short Story (ebook)
- Close to Home (Black Inc., 2018)
- One Hundred Days (Black Inc., 2021)
- When Granny Came to Stay (Pan Macmillan Australia, 2022)
- Be Careful, Xiao Xin! Illustrated by Sher Rill Ng (Harper Collins, 2022)
- Millie Mak the Maker, illustrated by Sher Rill Ng (Harper Collins, 2023)
- Millie Mak the Mender (Millie Mak, #2), illustrated by Sher Rill Ng (Harper Collins, 2024)
- Millie Mak Makes Her Mark (Millie Mak, #3), illustrated by Sher Rill Ng (Harper Collins, 2025)

=== Articles ===
- "A sacrifice shouldered, a loyalty pledged beyond words". The Age. 30 September 2007.
- "Shunned in a strange land, we should offer them more". The Age. 17 August 2008.
- "It's time to embrace the 'f' word". The Age. 28 October 2007.
- "Living with Racism in Australia", 7 December 2016 in The New York Times
- "How an elderly couple showed Alice Pung the power of a good story", 27 June 2025 in The Conversation

== Critical studies and reviews of Pung's work ==
Her Father's Daughter (2011)

- On, Thuy (September 2011). "Filial love song". Australian Book Review (334): 24.
- Brewster, Anne (2017) Remembering Violence in Alice Pung's Her Father's Daughter: The Postmemoir and Diasporisation, Life Writing, 14:3, 313–325, doi:10.1080/14484528.2017.1328298

Growing Up Asian in Australia (editor, 2008)

- Graham, Pamela (2013) Alice Pung's Growing up Asian in Australia: The Cultural Work of Anthologized Asian-Australian Narratives of Childhood, Prose Studies, 35:1, 67–83, doi:10.1080/01440357.2013.781412

Unpolished Gem (2006)

- Ommundsen, Wenche (2010) Writing as Cultural Negotiation: Suneeta Peres da Costa and Alice Pung. In: Collett A., D’Arcens L. (eds) The Unsociable Sociability of Women's Lifewriting. Palgrave Macmillan, London.
- D'Arcangelo, Adele. (2014) Unpolished Gem/Gemma impura the Journey from Australia to Italy of Alice Pung's Bestselling Novel. Journal of the Association for the Study of Australian Literature, [S.l.], v. 14, n. 1, June. ISSN 1833-6027. Available at: https://openjournals.library.sydney.edu.au/index.php/JASAL/article/view/9877.
