= Nell Murbarger =

American writer (b. 1909, d. 1991)

- Born: October 19, 1909; South Dakota
- Died: December 19, 1991 (aged 82); Missouri
- Occupations: author and reporter

Nell Murbarger (1909-1991) was an American writer and journalist who was inducted in to the Nevada Writers Hall of Fame. Murbarger is perhaps best known for her many articles in Desert Magazine, where she popularized the hobby of "ghost-towning."

== Early life ==
Murbarger was born in South Dakota in 1909, to Harry C. ("Clem") and Bessie Nell (White) Lounsberry. Clem Lounsberry was an occasional newspaper reporter. Nell Murbarger's earliest writing for publication was at age ten. The family moved to California in 1923, where they picked fruit. In 1930, they settled in Costa Mesa, California.

In the 1920s, Murbarger and her mother started the West Coast Curio Company, which sold seashells, urchins and gold-rush era relics.

In 1931, Murbarger married W. Black Murbarger, an amateur archaeologist. She is credited with finding the first specimen of Lithophragma maximum a rare flowering plant found on San Clemente Island. The couple lived in Northern and Central California before they separated and were divorced in 1939.

== Professional career ==
In 1936, Murbarger was working for the Globe-Herald, the Costa Mesa weekly paper, where she eventually became editor. She left in 1939, but returned a few months later, joining the new Newport-Balboa Press as the local news editor from 1940-1945.

After World War II ended, she retired from the newspaper business and devoted her efforts to freelance writing. She was a regular contributor to magazines such as Desert Magazine, Sunset, Arizona Magazine and True West Magazine. She also had articles published in newspapers such The Christian Science Monitor, The Salt Lake Tribune, and smaller papers.

Murbarger's first article in Desert Magazine appeared in 1949. Murbarger wrote under pen names such as Dean Conrad, Greta Joens, Dale Conroy, and Costa Mesa Slim. In Desert Magazine, she would sometimes have two articles, one under a pen name, the other under her real name. In 1950, she was offered an assistant editor position at Desert Magazine, which she declined so that she could continue her field work. In 1958, Desert Magazine was sold and Murbarger was limited to six articles a year.

She received the American Association for State and Local History Award of Merit in 1955.

In 1955, she received several awards from the California Association of Press Women. Her article "Josie Pearl, Prospector on Nevada's Black Rock Desert" received a first place for interviews, and her article about Fort Schellbourne received second prize for special feature articles. In addition, she took two other first prizes and a second prize for articles outside of Nevada.

Her book "Ghosts of the Glory Trail" was awarded best nonfiction book of 1956 written by an American woman by the National Federation of Press Women.

In 1963, Murbarger claimed that she had published over 1,000 articles about the western United States.

== Later years ==
Murbarger's freelance career wound down in the 1960s. In the mid-1980s she sold the bulk of her photographic collection (about 10,000 images) to Nevada historian Stan Paher. The Costa Mesa Historical Society received her papers a few years later. In the late 1980s, she was living with her partner Ed Gueguen in a Costa Mesa bungalow that had the last of the inventory of the West Coast Curio Company. In 1989, Murbarger and Guegen moved to Guegen's family home in Lexington, Missouri. Murbarger died of Parkinson's disease there in 1991.

In 1996, Murbarger was inducted in to the Nevada Writers Hall of Fame.
