= Ina Mihalache =

Canadian actress

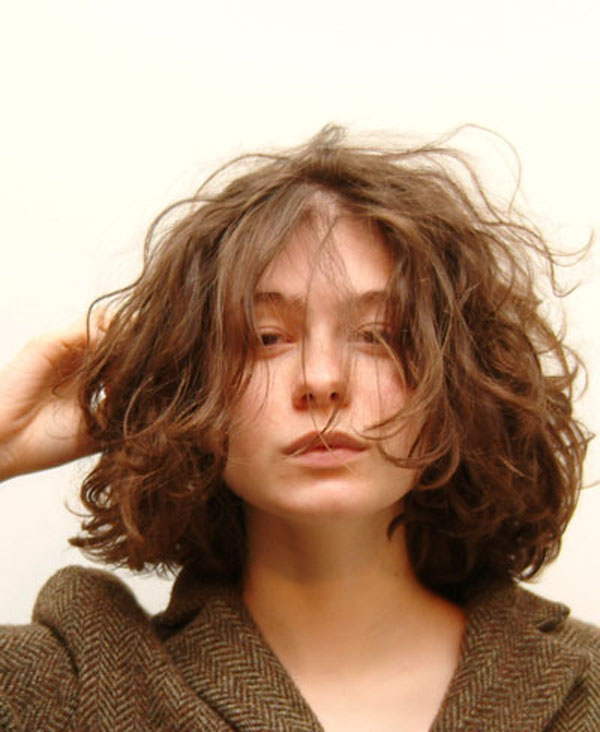
- Ina Mihalache in 2004
- Born: May 14, 1985 (age 40); Montreal, Quebec, Canada
- Education: Classe Libre of Cours Florent
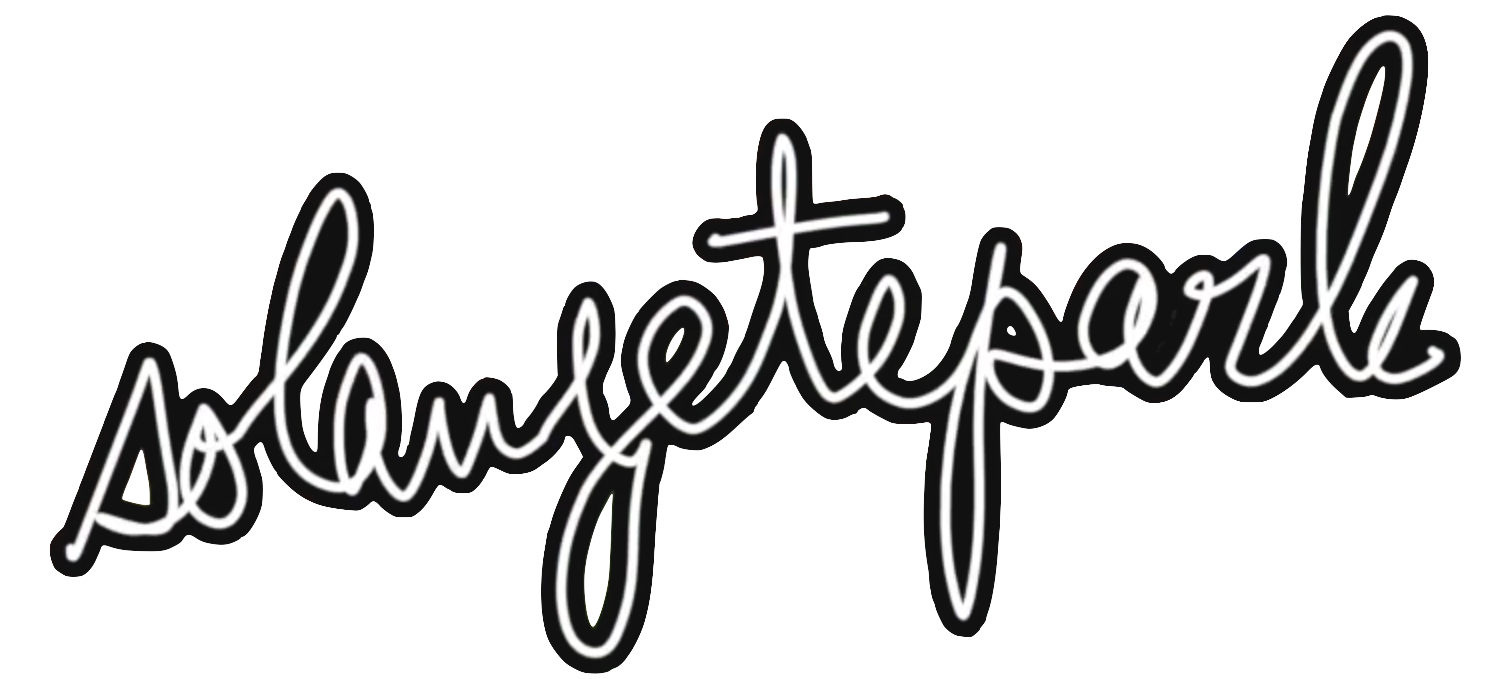
- Logo of the program

YouTube information
- Channel: SolangeTeParle
- Genres: Video blog; performance art
- Subscribers: 413 thousand
- Website: solangeteparle.com

Ina Mihalache (French pronunciation: [i.na mi.a.laʃ]; born May 14, 1985) is a Canadian-born, France-based actress, video artist, visual artist, comedian, editor and YouTube personality. She has resided in France since 2004.

Mihalache is mostly known for her YouTube channel Solange Te Parle (Solange Talks to You / Solange Speaks) where, posing as her eccentric online persona Solange, she addresses viewers on various topics. She created her channel in November 2011, and was met with modest success, reaching 200,000 subscribers by April 2016. In February 2022, the channel had 413,000 subscribers. Mihalache aims to portray emotion through the use of films which cover a broad range of interests including culture, art, sexuality and feelings.

== Biography ==
Mihalache was born in Montreal, Quebec, of a Romanian-born father, Dumitru Mihalache, and a French Canadian mother, Doris Duguay. At the age of ten, she decided to give up her native Quebec accent to adopt a "French of France" accent as she heard it on the radio or on French-language television channels such as TV5Monde. She explained this as an "aesthetic choice", which fueled controversy in her native Quebec.

Mihalache arrived in Paris in 2004, and entered the Cours Florent. Subsequently, she was admitted to the Classe Libre under the guidance of Jean-Pierre Garnier and Olivier L. Brunet, but failed four times the entrance examination of the Conservatoire national supérieur d'art dramatique.

Her main artistic and cinematic influences are Anna Karina, Emmanuelle Riva, Lars von Trier, Sophie Calle, and Tehching Hsieh.

After being introduced to the Talents Cannes de l'Adami by Mathieu Amalric in the short film Deux cages sans oiseaux, she devoted herself to the production of atypical works, such as the trilogy Réussites/Patiences, addressing the questions of inadequacy, the isolation, the idleness, and the nudity of the body in the public space. She also works for France Télévisions as an editor and voice-over.

In November 2011, Mihalache created the blog Solange te parle, a compilation of clips with themes, like Norman Thavaud. The character of Solange delivers comical and often absurd advice to solve the problems of the daily life of an asocial young woman. Her reasonings of pataphysical character evoke La Minute nécessaire de monsieur Cyclopède of Pierre Desproges and Jean-Louis Fournier, or some conceptual experiences of the American artist John Baldessari. Mihalache later stated about her creation: "Solange is inadequate. She does not know how to do things, but she tries".

In April 2012, Mihalache played the character of Sasha Maréchal in the France 3 documentary: EtrangesAffaires.com, alongside journalist Patrick Pesnot.

In July 2012, Mihalache collaborated with Radio France with a series of 54 daily capsules broadcast on France Inter on Thomas Baumgartner's Antibuzz: Solange lit tous tes tweets whose themes are taken from a few tweets. She returned in February 2013 with the series Solange dans le bus, released every Tuesday in the programme of Pascale Clark Comme on nous parle. Another series, Solange pénètre ta vie intime, which consisted of anonymous accounts on female sexuality, was published on the website of radio station Mouv' on February 14, 2013, and was broadcast daily until June 2013. The series resumed in January 2014.

On stage she played the title role in Virginia Wolf directed by Nathalie Bensard and adapted from the eponymous album of Kyo Maclear and Isabelle Arsenault.

On January 6, 2016, Mihalache published her first book at Payange editions, Solange te parle, inspired by her experience on the Internet.

On January 30, 2016, the screening of her feature film Solange et les vivants (screened between 2013 and 2014 and produced by participative financing) began at the Luminor Hôtel de Ville. The national projection began on March 9, 2016.

In October 2016 she joined Le Fresnoy – National Studio of Contemporary Arts in the promotion of Chantal Akerman.

In February 2017, she published a second book, Très intime, verbatim of the accounts that were broadcast on radio station Mouv' in 2013, with a foreword by Mihalache.

== Controversies ==
In April 2017, controversy arose after the publication of Mihalache's book Très intime: some women, who presented themselves as the authors of some of the accounts in the book (including true stories about rape and domestic abuse) expressed their discontent on social media, citing privacy and intellectual property issues. They claimed Mihalache did not ask them for permission before including the stories in a commercially published book. Mihalache responded on the controversy with an apology on her Twitter account, citing "organization issues". One of the plaintiffs eventually stated on her blog that she was giving up on costly legal proceedings.

In 2018, Mihalache was involved in a conflict of interest controversy surrounding a committee within the Centre national du cinéma et de l'image animée (CNC) dedicated to publicly subsidize content produced by online videographers in France. In one instance, Mihalache and Cyprien Iov, both YouTubers and members of the committee, were accused on social media of using their position to grant subsidies to each other. Iov and the CNC denied any situation of conflict of interest.

== Filmography ==
Year	Title	Role	Creator	Director	Notes
2007	Deux cages sans oiseaux	Sister Muriel	Mathieu Amalric		
2007	Tu peux ne pas du tout penser à moi			Olivier L. Brunet (co-director)	
2008	Grossesses et Macarons	Clémentine	Anne Flandrin		
2011	EtrangesAffaires.com : L'affaire des vedettes de Cherbourg	Sasha Maréchal	Olivier L. Brunet		
2012	EtrangesAffaires.com : L'affaire des missiles Exocet	Sasha Maréchal	Olivier L. Brunet		
2012	L'entropie du milieu humain	Geek presenter	Vivien Loiseau		
2016	Solange et les vivants	Solange		Ina Mihalache	Lead role
2016	Ma révolution	Teacher	Ramzi Ben Sliman		

== Works ==
=== Video works ===
Years	Title	Notes
2010	Réussites/Patiences	Performance/triptych video of 8 hours featuring two actresses in real time
2011–	Solange Te Parle	Internet video series

=== Publications ===
Year	Title	Publisher	ISBN
2016	Solange te parle	Payot	ISBN 9782228914512
2017	Très intime	Payot	ISBN 9782228917063

=== Radio ===
Years	Title	Notes
2012	Solange lit tous tes tweets	Series of 54 sound capsules for France Inter and the programme "Antibuzz" by Thomas Baumgartner
2013	Solange dans le bus	Series of sound capsules for France Inter and the programme "Comme nous nous parle" by Pascale Clark
2013–14	Solange pénètre ta vie intime	Series of sound capsules for the Mouv'

=== Editing and voice overs ===
Year	Title	Network	Notes
2008	Signes de l'espérance	France 2	Editing
2009	Les Silences de Maurice Zundel	France 2	Editing and voice over
2010	Ultreïa!	France 2	Editing and voice over
2011	La Beauté du geste	France 3	Editing

== Theatre ==
Year	Title	Notes
2014	Virginia Wolf	Nathalie Bensard's young audience show, based on the album of Kyo Maclear and Isabelle Arsenault, with Marie Craipeau; title role

== Awards ==
=== Cours Florent ===
Year	Named work	Reward	Result
2007	Ina Mihalache in Babylone by Matthieu Dessertine	"Jacques" for the best actor	Won
