= Nell Beecham =

British LGBT rights activist

Nell Beecham is an LGBT activist based in the United Kingdom, known for her work in the field of LGBT rights and feminism.

== Biography ==
Beecham has been linked to Stonewall (UK) for her work as a Youth Volunteer, establishing a number of LGBT youth projects in schools in North London.

Beecham later held the position of LGBT Officer at the University of York alongside filmmaker Thomas Paul Martin.
