= Lange Nelle Lighthouse =

Lange Nelle
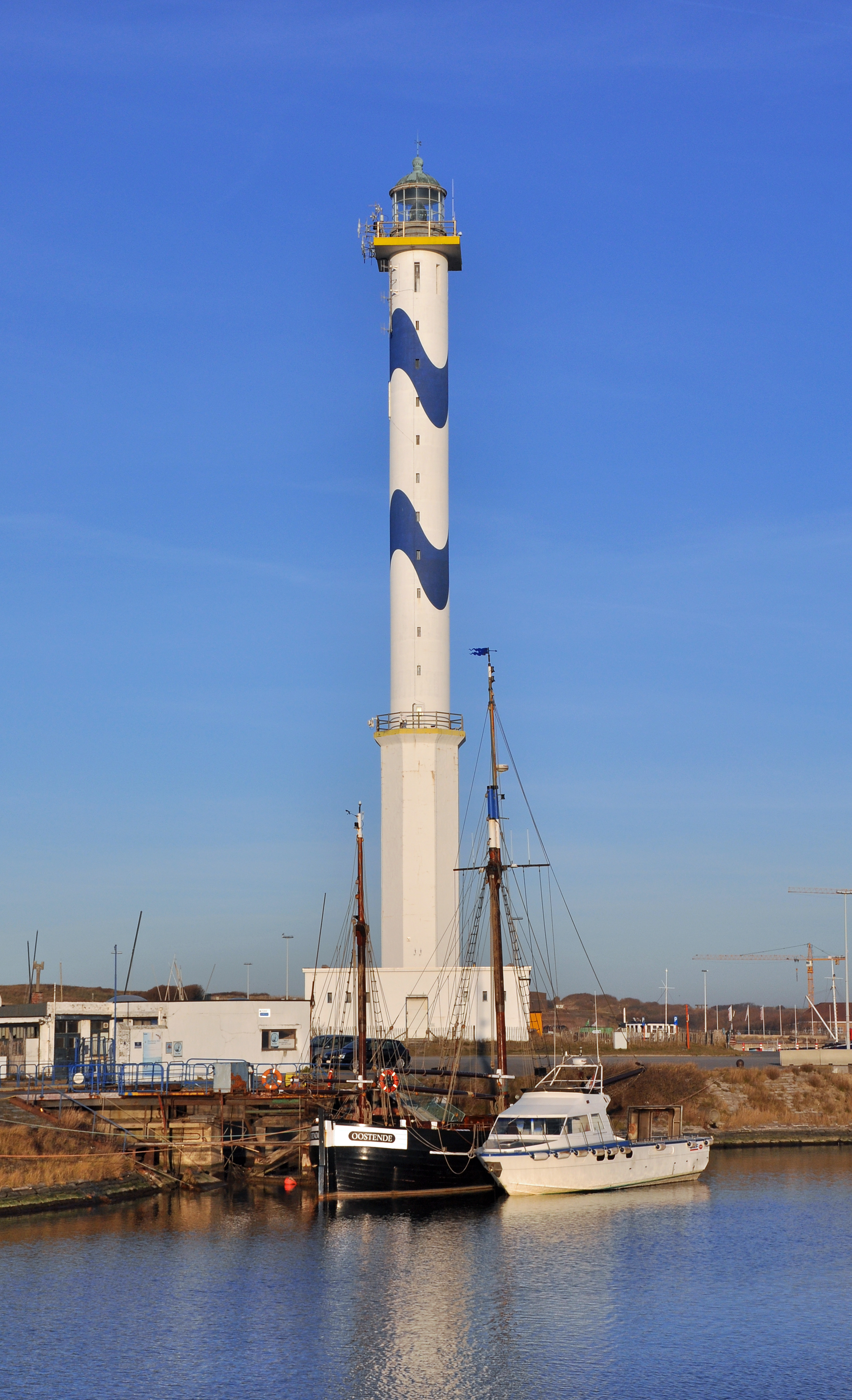
- Lange Nelle Lighthouse in Ostend.
- Location: Ostend; Flanders; Belgium
- Coordinates: 51°14′10.8″N 02°55′49.7″E

Tower
- Constructed: 1771 (first)
- Construction: concrete and brick tower
- Height: 57.5 m (189 ft)
- Shape: slim two-stage tower, octagonal prism the lower section, cylindrical the upper section with double balcony and lantern
- Markings: white tower with two sinusoidal blue bands in the upper section, golden balcony
- Heritage: beschermd erfgoed

Light
- First lit: 1949
- Focal height: 65 m (213 ft)
- Intensity: 1,940,000 candela
- Range: 27 nautical miles (50 km)
- Characteristic: Fl (3) W 10s.
- Belgium no.: BE-0440

Lange Nelle Lighthouse is a lighthouse in Ostend, Flanders, Belgium. It is located at the Belgian coastline of the North Sea.

While the station was established in 1771, the present lighthouse tower was opened in 1949. It is 58 metres (190 ft) in height, with the light at 65 metres (213 ft) above sea level. The lighthouse tower was painted white and blue waves in 1994. The light is visible up to 27 nautical miles (50 km), using the Fresnel lens lighting system.
