= Maria Znamierowska-Prüfferowa =

Polish ethnographer, Vilnius, Toruń, 20th century

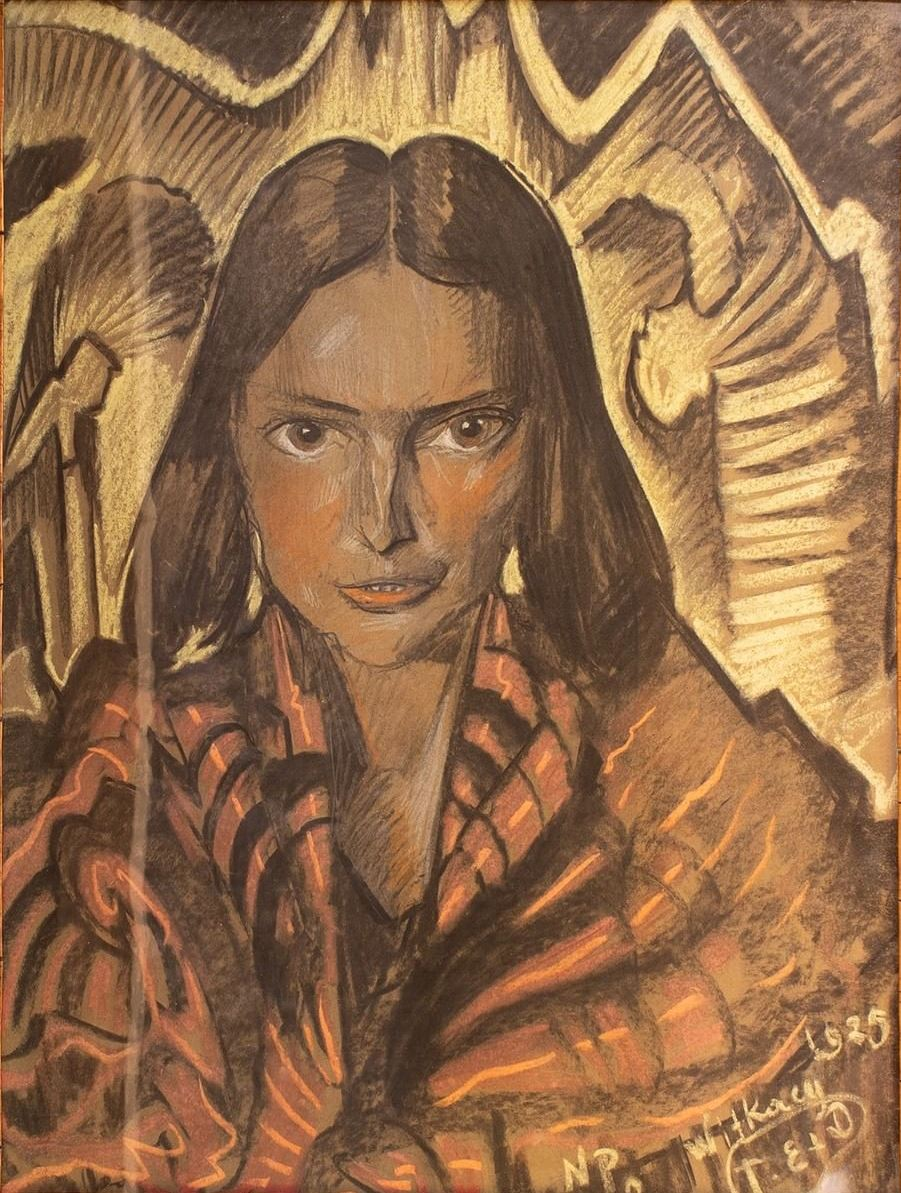
- Portrait of Znamierowska-Prüfferowa by Stanisław Ignacy Witkiewicz, 1925
- Born: Maria Znamierowska; 13 May 1898; Kibarty, Suwałki Governorate, Congress Poland
- Died: 2 August 1990 (aged 92); Toruń, Poland
- Education: Stephen Báthory University
- Occupation: Ethnographer
- Known for: Director of the Ethnographic Museum in Toruń
- Parents: Stanisław (father); Leokadia née Andrzejewski (mother)
- Awards: Commander's Cross of the Order of Polonia Restituta Gold Cross of Merit Medal of the National Education Commission

Maria Znamierowska-Prüfferowa (1898–1990) was a Polish ethnographer, professor at the Nicolaus Copernicus University in Toruń, founder and long-term director of the Toruń Ethnographic Museum, posthumously named after her. She was also an activist of the Polish Ethnological Society.

== Biography ==
=== Early life ===
Znamierowska was the daughter of Stanisław, a customs officer, and Leokadia née Andrzejewski, a governess. She was born on May 13, 1898, in the village of Kybartai, Lithuania, then part of the Russian Empire.

She completed primary school and middle school in Liepāja (in today's Latvia), passing her final exams in 1915.

=== First studies and activism ===
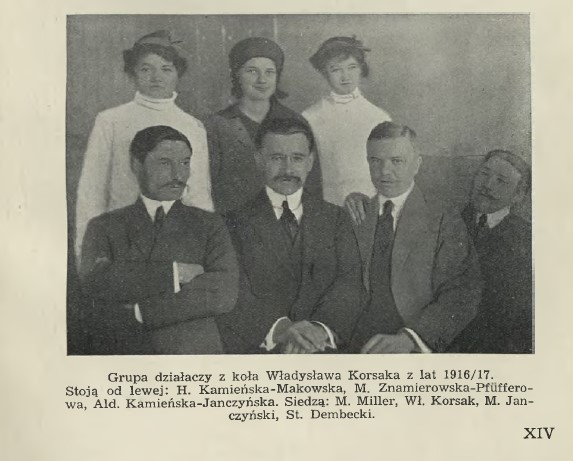
In Kiev's Polish University College, 1920. Maria-standing in the middle, W. Korsak seating-second from the right

While her family moved abroad for professional reasons (Russia, Romania), she left in October 1915 for Kiev, where she stayed for nearly 3 years. There, the young Maria became acquainted with the Polish community. At the beginning, she attended lectures at the "Higher Women's Courses" at the Faculty of Philology and in 1917 she moved to the Polish University College (Polish: Polskie Kolegium uniwersyteckie w Kijowie).

In this institution, she entered the circle of Władysław Korsak (1890–1949), a Polish activist and a future deputy Minister of Interior. Over the course of two years (1916–1918), she worked in relationship with the youth progress-independent movement "Filarecja" and the Polish Socialist Party (PPS).

=== End of WWI ===
In November 1918, when the Bolsheviks occupied Kiev, Maria and her family were forced to leave the city, heading for Warsaw. The following year, she initially worked in a school in Mokas before moving to Pruszków, where Janusz Korczak, Maria Powysocka and Maria Rogowska-Falska had just established an exemplary orphanage, "Nasz Dom" (Our home).

At the end of 1920, Maria Znamierowska settled in Vilnius, capital of the Polish-controlled puppet state of Central Lithuania. In 1921, she began humanities studies at the Vilnius University then called "Stephen Báthory" University (Uniwersytet Stefana Batorego-USB).

Suffering from tuberculosis, she frequently had to visit Zakopane for treatment. In the Polish mountain resort, she met people like Michał Choromański, Henryk Worcell and Maria Kasprowiczowa. It was also there, in 1925, that Stanisław Ignacy Witkiewicz realized many portraits of her.

After a year at the Faculty of Humanities, she turned to studies at the Faculty of Mathematics and Natural Sciences where she met her future husband, entomology professor Jan Prüffer. Originating from Kraków, he was then a lecturer at the biology department since 1922.

They married on 4 February 1925. It was her second marriage. The first one, concluded in 1920, was short-lived.

=== Work at the Stephen Báthory University (USB) and second World War ===
In Vilnius, Maria Znamierowska-Prüfferowa started ethnology studies in autumn 1926, under the direction of Cezaria Baudouin de Courtenay Ehrenkreutz Jędrzejewiczowa. A year later, she took a post at the USB Ethnographic Museum, where she worked till the outbreak of WWII. From this period, her passion for ethnography and museology became engraved in her genes.

She published her monograph in 1930, The fisheries of the Trakai lakes (Polish: Rybołówstwo jezior trockich), and pursued research in the field of ethnology. Her first scientific tutor was prof. Cezaria Jędrzejewiczowa (in Vilnius). Later, once Maria moved to the Polish capital, her mentor was prof. Kazimierz Moszyński (1887–1959) who had been chairing since 1935 the Department of Ethnology in Warsaw.

In 1932, Maria Znamierowska-Prüfferowa obtained master's degrees in ethnology and ethnography. In 1936, she was employed as an assistant professor in the Department of Ethnology at the USB and in 1939, she defended her doctorate dissertation entitled Fishing bones. Attempt to classify fish bones of north-eastern Poland (Polish: Ości rybackie. Próba klasyfikacji ości północno-wschodniej Polski) written under the supervision of prof. Kazimierz Moszyński.

During the interwar period, Maria traveled abroad to hone her museology expertise: France, Austria, Yugoslavia, Hungary, Czechoslovakia, Scandinavia and the Baltic States. While conducting field researches for the USB Ethnographic Museum, she also took up teaching activities at the USB "Eastern European Research Institute" (Polish: Instytut Naukowo-Badawczy Europy Wschodniej). She strived to popularize the protection of ethnographic monuments by engaging people in rural schools, public schools or on the national radio. Before the war, she gained the qualification of museum curator.

Znamierowska-Prüfferowa had been working during the first 3 years of World War II at the USB museum. However, in 1942, after having been briefly arrested by the Germans, she left the institution and started earning money by giving private lessons. In 1943, she became involved in underground education activities. At the start of the Soviet occupation with the Vilnius offensive of July 1944, Maria resumed her work in the museum.

=== Work at the Nicolaus Copernicus University in Toruń ===
With the end of the war and the breakaway of Vilnius from the Polish state, Maria and her husband moved to Toruń, as did most of the Polish university community. They arrived there on 14 July 1945. The "Nicolaus Copernicus University" in Toruń was established officially on 24 August 1945, partially to compensate the academic losses after the liquidation of the USB in Vilnius and the "University of John Casimir" in Lwów.

Maria Znamierowska got there a full-time position as assistant professor in the Department of Ethnology. She failed to convince the authorities to re-establish an ethnographic museum attached to the university, as there used to be in Vilnius. Nevertheless, she compiled the collections of the Ethnographic Department in the city Municipal Museum and organized there the first exhibition in 1948.

In 1955, she was elevated to the rank of associate professor. The associated habilitation dissertation, untitled Fishing gears in Poland and neighboring countries (Polish: Rybackie narzędzia kolne w Polsce i w krajach sąsiednich) was published in 1957 in Poland. An English translation was issued in 1966 in the United States.

=== Toruń Ethnographic Museum ===
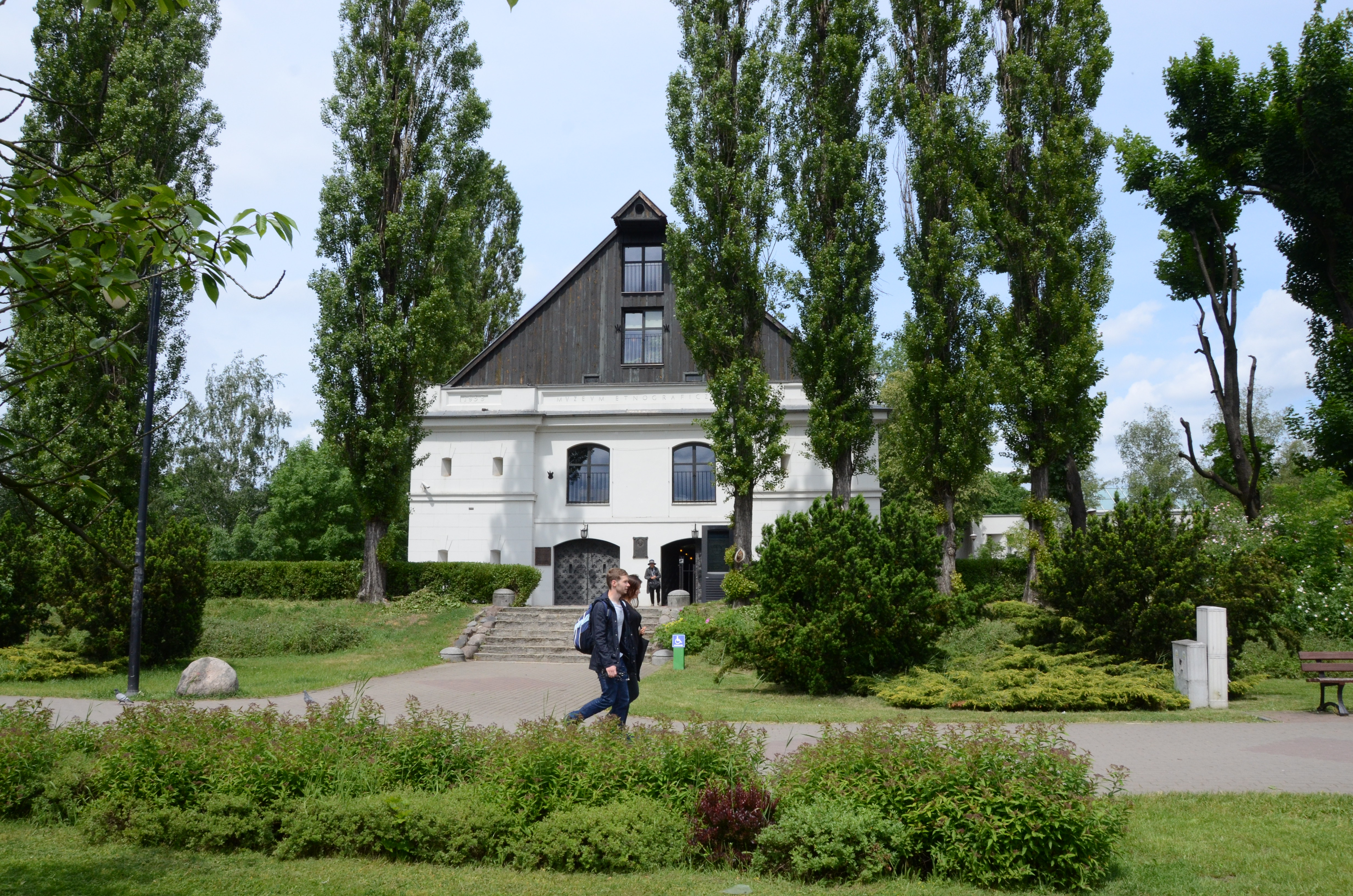
Toruń Ethnographic Museum – Arsenal building

From 1946 to 1958, Znamierowska-Prüfferowa led the Ethnographic Department of the City Museum in Toruń; she used her position to champion the concept of a city ethnographic Museum, together with a skansen, working as an independent institution.

She received the authorities blessing for its creation in 1953. The museum was officially opened on 1 January 1959, in the building of the former city arsenal.

Maria logically became the first director of the Ethnographic Museum in Toruń from 1959 (its creation) to 1972 (her retirement).

The city ethnographic museum is today the only institution in Poland with three ethnographic parks, in Toruń, Kaszczorek and Wielka Nieszawka.

Since 2008, part of Maria's legacy has been organized in a permanent exhibition of the museum, "Prof. Maria Znamierowska-Prüfferowa”.

=== Social and academical activities ===
The 22nd General Assembly of the Ethnological Society in Lublin, on 25 January 1947, established the "Polish Ethnological Society" (Polish: Polskie Towarzystwo (PTL)): Maria Znamierowska-Prüfferowa was a member of its main board till 1978 and vice-chaired the institution between 1967 and 1970. In March 1947, she founded a branch of the PTL in Toruń, seating as a branch secretary, as a vice president in 1949 and as a president in 1954. She kept this position till 1981.

She combined museum work, trips to national and international conferences and attendance at academical societies (Advisory group of the museums and monuments Protection Board-Polish: Zespół Doradczy przy Zarządzie Muzeów i Ochrony Zabytków, Museums and Cultural Property Protection at the Ministry of Culture and Art-Polish: Sekcja Muzeów i Ochrony Dóbr Kultury przy Ministerstwie Kultury i Sztuki).

In 1978, she was awarded the honorary membership of the PTL for her contribution to ethnological activities. In addition, her publications related to ethnographic museology in Poland had a great influence on the development of other institutions (in Kluki, Szczecin, Gdynia or Białystok). In her trip to Switzerland, she undertook activities aiming at preserving the collections of the Polish museum in Rapperswil.

The museum inventory realized by Znamierowska-Prüfferowa in Toruń comprised nearly 14 000 ethnographic pieces from northern Poland, including at that time the richest collection in traditional folk fishing. The inventory contained 3 permanent exhibitions on material culture and folk art, and a pedagogical hall. The museum also embraced a skansen about Kuyavia traditions, with a homestead and a large granary. She published several museum books, guides and monographs.

The academical bibliography of prof. Znamierowska-Prüfferowa includes over 130 items. Her works mainly covered fishing, museology, folklore, art and construction. After retirement, she published her last book, Traditional folk fishing against the background of the collections and research of the Ethnographic Museum in Toruń (Polish: Tradycyjne rybołówstwo ludowe na tle zbiorów i badań Muzeum Etnograficznego w Toruniu).

Furthermore, she left a correspondence, with family, eminent ethnographers and people from the artistic world, such as Vilnius photographers Bolesława and Edmund Zdanowski, Lithuanian poet Tomas Venclova and writer Maria Kasprowiczowa.

Maria Znamierowska-Prüfferowa died on 20 August 1990. She is buried at St. George's catholic cemetery in Toruń. Jan and Maria had no children.

== Awards and decorations ==
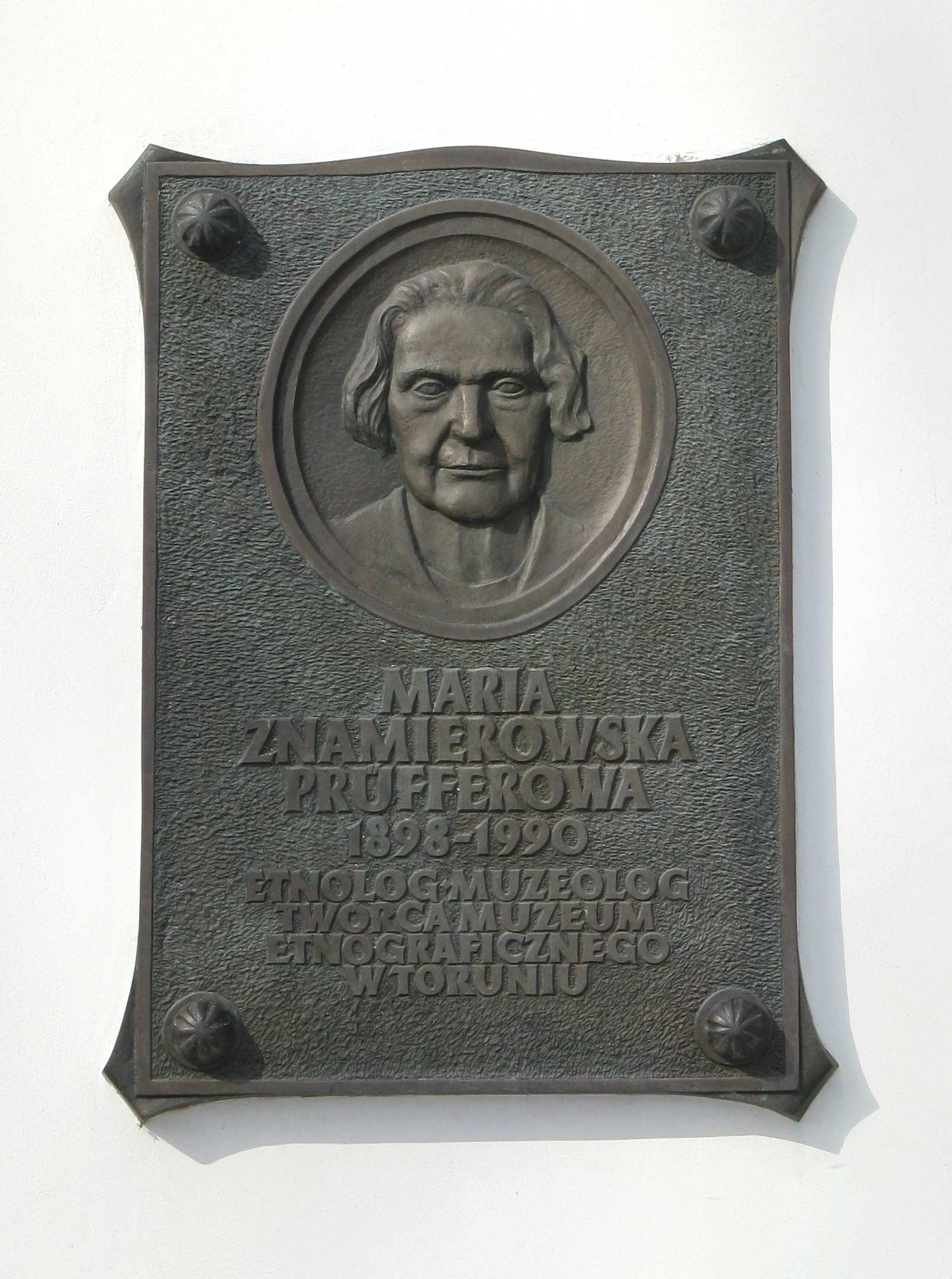
Maria Znamierowska-Prüfferowa commemorative plaque

- Gold Cross of Merit (10 March 1939) "for merits in the field of professional work".
- Oskar Kolberg's prize (1976).
- Commander's Cross of the Order of Polonia Restituta (1978).
- "Medal of the National Education Commission" (Polish: Medal Komisji Edukacji Narodowej) (1984).
- Badge of the honorary title "Meritorious for National Culture" (1988).

== Family and commemorations ==
- Jerzy Znamierowski (1895–1992), her brother, was a Polish philosopher, theosophist and anthroposophist. In 1949, he was arrested in Vilnius by the Soviet security authorities and sentenced to ten years in a camp for promoting anthroposophy. Back to Poland, he settled in Toruń.
- Since 15 December 1999, the Ethnographic Museum in Toruń bears Znamierowska-Prüfferowa's name. This naming was officialized on the occasion of the institution's 40th anniversary. A commemorative plaque of the professor was additionally unveiled on that day.
- A street on the left bank of Toruń has been named after "Maria and Jan Prüffer" (Polish: Ulica Jana i Marii Prüfferów).

== See also ==
- Toruń
- List of Polish people
- Oskar Kolberg
- Korczak's orphanages
- University of Lviv

== Bibliography ==
- Czachowski, Hubert (July 2019). MARIA ZNAMIEROWSKA-PRÜFFER: AN ETHNOLOGIST AND MUSEOLOGIST. Warszawa: Index Copernicus Sp. z o.o. pp. 154–162.
- (in Polish) Konkel, Antoni (2006). Maria Znamierowska-Prüfferowa. Jastarnia, sercu bliska [Maria Znamierowska-Prüfferowa. Jastarnia, dear to my heart.] (in Polish). Jastarnia: Wydawnictwo "MS". pp. 135–136. ISBN 83-89568-27-6.
- (in Polish) Tubaja, Roman (2006). Wkład Marii Znamierowskiej-Prüfferowej w rozwój muzealnictwa na wolnym powietrzu w Polsce [Maria Znamierowska-Prüfferowa's contribution to the development of open-air museology in Poland] (in Polish). Wdzydze: Biuletyn Stowarzyszenia Muzeów 9/2006. pp. 135–136. ISBN 83-89568-27-6.
