= Nell, Kentucky =

Unincorporated community in Kentucky, United States

Nell
- Unincorporated community
- Location within the state of Kentucky Nell (the United States)
- Coordinates: 37°0′34″N 85°29′0″W
- Country: United States
- State: Kentucky
- County: Adair
- Elevation: 745 ft (227 m)
- Time zone: UTC-6 (Central (CST))
  - Summer (DST): UTC-5 (CDT)
- GNIS feature ID: 508685

Nell is an unincorporated community in Adair County, Kentucky, United States. Its elevation is 745 feet (227 m).
