= Thomas Prufer =

American philosopher (1929–1993)

- Born: 1929
- Died: 1993 (aged 63–64)

Philosophical work
- Era: Contemporary philosophy
- Region: Western philosophy
- School: Continental philosophy
- Institutions: Catholic University of America

Thomas Prufer (/ˈpruːfər/; 1929–1993) was an American philosopher who taught at the Catholic University of America from 1960 to 1993. While his work is little-known, some academics have praised his collection Recapitulations: Essays in Philosophy (1993), which gathers his life's work.
