= Andrew Cibej =

Australian chef and restaurateur

- Born: 2 February 1970 (age 56); Sydney, Australia
- Education: University of Sydney

Andrew David Cibej (born 2 February 1970) is an Australian chef and restaurateur. He has worked in Canada, Sydney and Hong Kong. As of 2014, he works in Marrakesh, Morocco. He was the executive chef at Bacco Osteria in Angel Place, Sydney. Since 2022 he has been the chef at the restaurant +61 in Marrakech in Morocco.

== Family and education ==
Cibej is of Italian and Australian descent. His surname (pronounced Chee-bay) is of Slovenian origin, although his father's family is from Friuli, in the north-eastern corner of Italy. He was born in Sydney, grew up in the suburb of Gladesville and attended Newington College (1982–1987). In 1988, he commenced studying law at the University of Sydney but without graduating left Australia for Canada.

== Chef and restaurateur ==
In Canada, Cibej worked in a pizza shop and on his return to Sydney he worked in the kitchen at Tetsuya's in Rozelle. In 1999 he went to Italy and ran a restaurant near Florence for two years before working in Rome for six months. He returned to Australia in 2002 and three years later opened Vini in Surry Hills. His next restaurant was Berta in Alberta Street, Sydney, in a laneway bounded by Elizabeth, Goulburn, Wentworth and Liverpool streets. All these businesses closed or were sold around 2018. In 2010 he opened 121BC, a cantina and enoteca in Sydney before branching out in Hong Kong in 2013. In 2017 he opened Bacco in Ash Street, Sydney.
