= Nelle A. Coley =

Nelle Artis Coley (1909, Greensboro, North Carolina - April 14, 1999) was an American educator.

She attended local parochial primary schools (Episcopal and Lutheran) in Greensboro before starting public school. She entered Bennett College in 1926, completing her high school studies in 1927. For the next four years, she alternated her studies with summer employment as a waitress in restaurants on the Jersey Shore. She completed her undergraduate studies at Bennett College in 1931. Unable to find work in Greensboro, she moved to Beaufort, North Carolina, where she found a teaching job.

Coley continued teaching in Beaufort through the early 1930s, and spent her summers in New York, pursuing graduate studies at Temple University and Columbia University. She completed her graduate studies at Columbia in 1935. In the fall of 1935, she returned to Greensboro and started teaching at James B. Dudley High School. Coley sought to make her students question bias and think critically about society. During her career, she was a member of the Greensboro Alumnae Chapter of Delta Sigma Theta, American Association of University Women, the Bennett College Alumnae Association, NAACP, and the National Council of Negro Women. She served as president of the Classroom Teachers Association of the Greensboro Unit and the State Unit of the North Carolina Teachers Association, predecessor to the North Carolina Association of Educators.

Coley and other teachers were mentioned as inspirations and role models to the Greensboro Four and the Greensboro sit-ins.

She taught English courses at Dudley until her retirement in 1980. Mrs. Coley died on April 14, 1999, after a brief illness.

== External links for further reading ==
Baker, Scott, 2011. "Pedagogies of Protest: African American Teachers and the History of the Civil Rights Movement, 1940-1963." Teachers College Record, Vol. 113, No. 12. December 2011. http://eric.ed.gov/?id=EJ988307. Accessed May 29, 2016. Firewalled

Chafe, William H. (1980). Civilities and Civil Rights: Greensboro, North Carolina and the Black Struggle for Freedom. New York: Oxford University Press. (E185.615 .C43 1980). http://www.worldcat.org/oclc/4957224

Fairclough, Adam. (2007). A class of their own: Black teachers in the segregated South. Cambridge, Mass: Belknap Press of Harvard University Press. (LC2802 .S9 F35 2007) http://www.worldcat.org/oclc/434595724

Thuesen, Sarah. (2013). Greater Than Equal: African American Struggles for Schools and Citizenship in North Carolina, 1919–1965. Chapel Hill, NC: The University of North Carolina Press. (LC2802 .N8 T58 2013) http://www.worldcat.org/oclc/855019699

Wilson, E. H., & Mullally, S. (1983). Hope and dignity: Older Black Women of the South. Philadelphia: Temple University Press. http://www.worldcat.org/oclc/9016982
