= Nell Znamierowski =

American textile artist

- Born: 13 August 1931; Amsterdam, New York, United States
- Died: 29 April 2021 (aged 89); New York City, United States
- Education: Rhode Island School of Design
- Known for: Textile art

Nell Znamierowski (August 13, 1931 — April 29, 2021) was an American textile artist.

Znamierowski was born in Amsterdam, New York. She was born Aniela Znamierowska, the only child of Waclaw & Helena Wojnar Znamierowski and graduated from the Wilbur H. Lynch High School in Amsterdam in 1949.

She received a Bachelor of Fine Arts in Textile Design from the Rhode Island School of Design in 1953, and with a Fulbright Fellowship traveled to Finland to work at the School of Industrial Design, where she developed an interest in Rya rugs. During her career she has worked variously as a print designer, color consultant, and designer of woven fabric in addition to teaching at the school of the Brooklyn Museum of Art – where she also coordinated the fiber program – and the Fashion Institute of Technology. Works created or designed by Znamierowski can be found in the collections of the Smithsonian American Art Museum, the Cooper-Hewitt Museum, and the Art Institute of Chicago; and she has been featured in many solo and group exhibitions throughout the United States. She is the author of a number of guides to weaving, including Step-by-step weaving: a complete introduction to the craft of weaving, including photographs in full color (1967) and Step-by-step rugmaking: a complete introduction to the craft of rugmaking (1972). She has also written for numerous textile-based publications, including Craft Horizons, Piecework, American Craft, Handwoven, and Fiberarts, and has lectured widely and given workshops throughout her career.

Znamierowski died in New York City at the age of 89 on April 29, 2021. A memorial Mass took place on 11 September 2021 at St. Stanislaus Church in Amsterdam, NY, followed immediately by the interment at St. Casimir’s Cemetery.
