= Jan Prüffer =

Polish entomologist

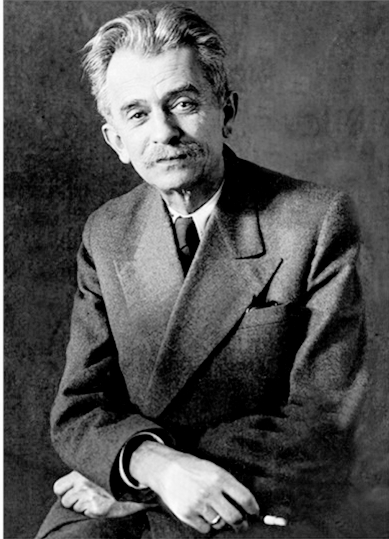
- Born: March 5, 1890
- Died: December 30, 1959 (aged 69); Toruń
- Scientific career
- Fields: Biology, taxonomy, entomology
- Institutions: Nicolaus Copernicus University in Toruń

Jan Prüffer (1890– 1959) was a Polish biologist, a taxonomic authority in entomology.

During the German occupation of Poland he gave lectures at the underground educational facilities.

Dean of the Faculty of Mathematics and Natural Sciences of the Nicolaus Copernicus University in Toruń (1947–1947)

Officer of the Order of Polonia Restituta.

In 1925 he married Maria Znamierowska-Prüfferowa, who became professor of ethnography. They had no children.

A street in Toruń has the name of Jan and Maria Prüffers.
