= Nell (artist) =

Australian artist

Nell (born 1975) is an Australian artist working across performance, installation, video, painting and sculpture. In 2013, she won the University of Queensland Self-Portrait Award. In 2017, she was inducted into the Maitland City Hall of Fame in the category of The Arts.

Nell lives and works in Sydney.

== Biography ==
Nell was born in 1975 in Maitland, New South Wales. Her wife is the celebrity chef Kylie Kwong. She practises Buddhist philosophy.

Nell studied under Lindy Lee at Sydney College of the Arts, the University of Sydney (1995), with Joan Jonas and John Baldessari at the University of California Los Angeles (1996) and with Annette Messager at the École Nationale Supérieure des Beaux-Arts, Paris (2006).

== Career ==
Nell's work often engages with binaries – life and death, happiness and sadness, dark and light. She draws on imagery from rock 'n roll, and employs a lexicon of repeated motifs in her work including smiley faces, lightning bolts, clouds, rain drops, suns, and faces.

Nell's work has been included in over 200 exhibitions in Australia and abroad. In 1999, early in her exhibiting career, her work was selected for Primavera, an exhibition of notable Australian contemporary artists under 35 years old, at the Museum of Contemporary Art Australia (MCA) in Sydney.

Around this time she also staged exhibitions at Galerie Y-Burg, Vrieshuis Amerika, Amsterdam (1998), and with the Indian artist Neha Choksi at 4A Centre for Contemporary Asian Art, Sydney (1999) and in Byculla, Mumbai (2000). Nell's first institutional exhibition was mounted at the Art Gallery of New South Wales in 2001.

In 2011, Nell was commissioned by the Museum of Old and New Art, Hobart, to produce the exhibition Let There Be Robe. Two performance works that took place in multiple iterations and venues were also commissioned, Chanting to Amps (2012) and It's a Long Way to the Top (2011, 2012).

In 2012, Jean-Hubert Martin curated Nell's work into the exhibition Theatre of the World at MONA in Hobart, in the same year staging her homecoming show, Home Town Girl Has Wet Dream at Maitland Regional Art Gallery. In 2013, Martin put on another exhibition of her work at La Maison Rouge, Paris.

Nell has collaborated with Australian fashion designers Romance Was Born. In 2014, the collaboration was exhibited at the National Gallery of Victoria in 2011-12 released through the label as The Oracle collection. This collection and collaboration was named "Masterpiece of Australian Fashion" for the first decade of this century by The Monthly magazine.

Nell often works outside the gallery, staging performances and installations in a variety of settings. In 2014, she presented work at Glastonbury Festival of Contemporary Performing Arts in England, and in 2015 at Performance Space, Sydney as part of their Day for Night festival of queer performance.

Nell was included in the 2016 Adelaide Biennial of Australian Art at the Art Gallery of South Australia with a major installation titled The Wake. The Wake was subsequently acquired by the Art Gallery of South Australia. The Wake is the subject of a book, with text by Julie Ewington. Also in 2016, Shepparton Art Museum hosted an eponymously titled survey exhibition of Nell's works.

Nell's work was included in the 25th anniversary edition of the Primavera exhibition in late 2016, first at the MCA in Sydney and afterwards touring regional centres.

In 2017, Nell was commissioned by the National Gallery of Victoria in Melbourne to make an outdoor sculpture to be permanently installed in their sculpture garden. Her work was included in the inaugural The National, a biennale of New Australian Art, at the Museum of Contemporary Art in Sydney. A solo exhibition, WORDS + CROSSES, was held at Ramp Gallery, Waikato Institute of Technology in Hamilton, New Zealand.

In 2018 she mounted a solo exhibition at the Walkway Art Gallery in Bordertown, South Australia.

In 2019, a solo exhibition featuring paintings, sculptures and brooches made in collaboration with New Zealand jeweller Neil Adcock was staged at the STATION gallery in Carriageworks as part of Sydney Contemporary art fair.

== Awards and residencies ==
Nell has undertaken residencies at the British Academy of Arts in Rome (2003), in Beijing with Red Gate Gallery (2005), at the Australian National University, Canberra (2007) and Artspace Sydney (2016).

In 2002, she travelled to Ravenna, Italy, on The Freedman Foundation Travelling Scholarship for Emerging Artists.

In 2001 Nell won the People's Choice Award in the Woollahra Small Sculpture Prize. In 2005, 2011 and 2013 she was Finalist in the Blake Prize.

Nell won the 2013 University of Queensland Self-Portrait Award for a video performance work.

In 2017 Nell was inducted into the Maitland City Hall of Fame in the category of The Arts alongside previous inductees John Bell AO OBE and Ruth Cracknell AM.

Since 2017, she has been a resident at the Carriageworks studios in Redfern, Sydney. Her great-grandfather worked at the Eveleigh railyards at the same location as a boilermaker, and a great uncle as a draughtsman there.
