= Warren Elliot Henry =

American physicist (1909–2001)

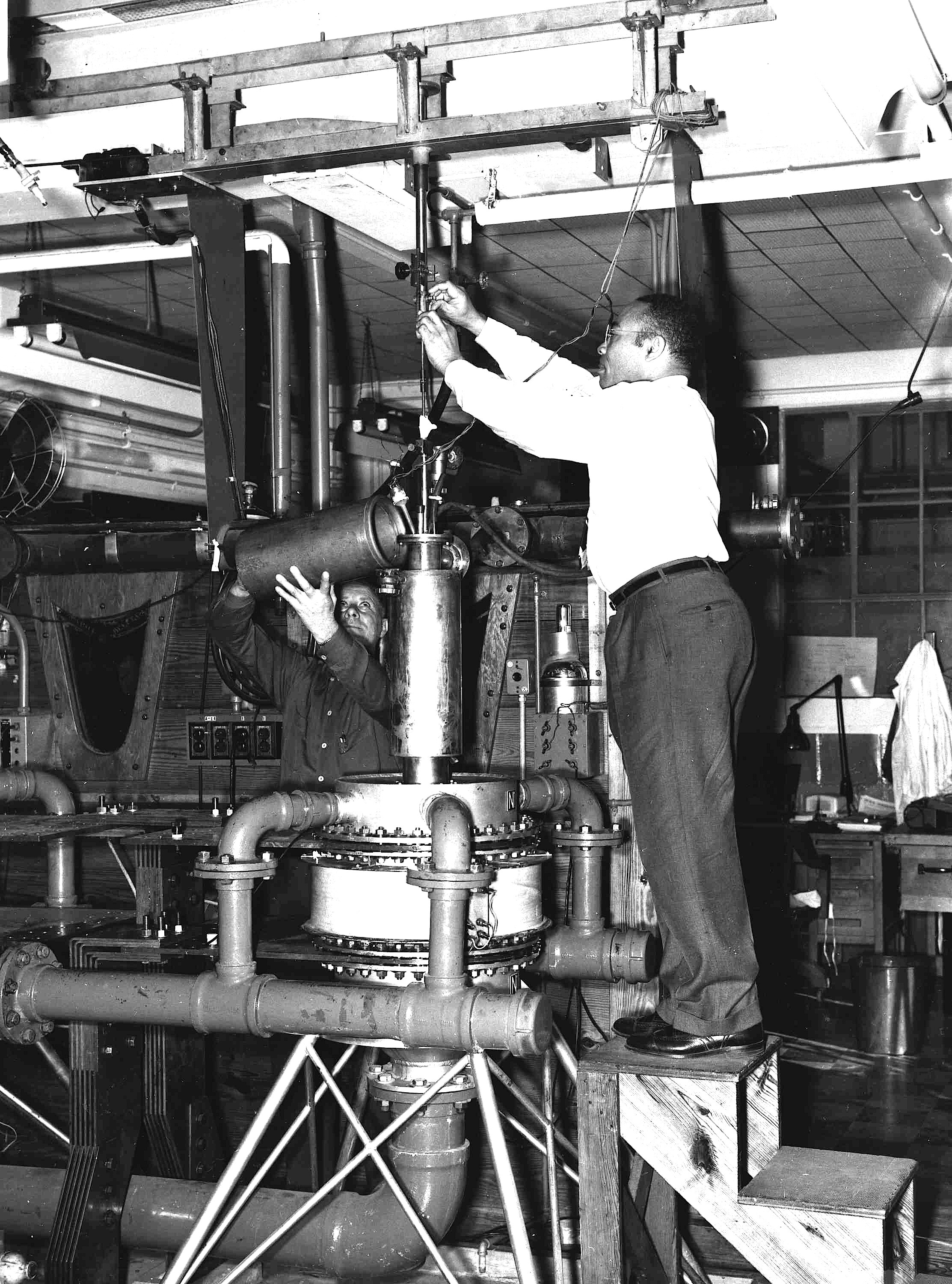
- Henry performing research at cryogenic temperatures in NRL's high magnetic field facility
- Born: February 18, 1909
- Died: October 31, 2001 (aged 92)
- Education: Tuskegee Institute, Atlanta University, University of Chicago
- Scientific career
- Fields: physics of magnetism and superconductivity
- Workplaces: Tuskegee Institute, U.S. Naval Research Laboratory, Howard University
- Thesis: I. resistance Thermometry and II. An Experimental Investigation of the Possibility of Using Alternating Current Techniques in the Measurement of Small Temperature Differences

Warren Elliot Henry (February 18, 1909 – October 31, 2001) was an American physicist, a Fellow of the American Physical Society, and the American Association for the Advancement of Science for his work in the fields of magnetism and superconductivity. He made significant contributions to the advancement of science and technology and education, training and mentoring several generations of physicists.

== Early life and education ==
Henry was born in Evergreen, Alabama in 1909. Henry attended Tuskegee Institute, as his parents had done. He completed majors in mathematics, English, and French, and minors in chemistry, physics, and German. He graduated in 1931 with a Bachelor of Science and as valedictorian of his class. Prior to continuing his studies, he served as a school principal at a segregated school in Atmore, Alabama. Henry earned a Master of Science degree in organic chemistry from Atlanta University in 1937.

While working towards his graduate degree, he taught classes at Spelman College and Morehouse College. He received a PhD in Physical Chemistry and Physics from the University of Chicago in 1941, with Dr. T.F. Young as an advisor, and graduated as the only Black person to receive the degree in his cohort of five candidates. His thesis was titled "I. resistance Thermometry and II. An Experimental Investigation of the Possibility of Using Alternating Current Techniques in the Measurement of Small Temperature Differences."

== Professional life ==
After graduating, in the fall of 1941 Henry returned to Tuskegee Institute where he taught courses. Some of his students were the 99th Pursuit Squadron, part of the Tuskegee Airmen.

From 1943 to 1946, Henry found a position at MIT's Radiation Laboratory. Following that, he worked in a postdoctoral position with Clarence Zener at the Institute for the Study of Metals at the University of Chicago. Following this, he returned to Morehouse University as acting head of its physics department.

Henry later worked as a physicist at the U.S. Naval Research Laboratory from 1948–1960. During this time he invented a metal dewar for liquid helium, and a magnetic moment lift for moving samples in and out of a magnetic field. With Robert Hein, Henry established in 1957 that uranium is a semiconductor.

Henry worked as senior staff scientist and senior staff engineer at Lockheed Missiles and Space Co. from 1960-1969. He developed fiber-optic devices for missile and submarine detection, and helped design the YO 3A, a night surveillance airplane used for night fighting. During his time at Lockheed, he also performed experiments on magnetic susceptibility at the University of California, Berkeley and worked with Glenn Seaborg. He then worked as a professor of physics at Howard University, beginning as a visiting professor in 1968 and becoming full-time in 1969. He authored dozens of scientific articles.

Henry formally retired in 1977, but he continued to devote his time to research and encouraging and helping new generations of scientists . He travelled worldwide giving talks and presentations and worked for years with the Minorities Access to Research Careers (MARC) program, established in 1975 by the National Institutes of General Medical Sciences. Henry founded the Committee on Minorities in Physics of the American Physical Society and was an early leader of the National Society of Black Physicists.

In an obituary written on November 10, 2001, the New York Times states "Dr. Henry studied under a number of Nobel Prize winners: Dr. Arthur H. Compton, the 1927 winner in physics, taught him quantum mechanics; Dr. Wolfgang Pauli, the 1945 winner, taught him the theory of nuclear forces; Dr. Robert A. Millikan, the 1923 winner, taught him molecular spectra. In addition, he played tennis with Dr. Enrico Fermi, a 1938 laureate."

== Personal life ==
Henry was married to Jeanne Pearlson Henry and they had one daughter, Eva Henry. On October 31, 2001, Henry died of congestive heart failure at Sibley Memorial Hospital.

== Awards and recognitions ==
Henry was a Fellow of the American Physical Society, and the American Association for the Advancement of Science. For 1974–75, he received the Outstanding Educator in America. He was the recipient of the Lifetime Achievement Award in the Community from the National Science Foundation, and the 1997 Technical Achiever Award of the Year from the National Technical Association. In 1997, he was awarded the 1st Annual Golden Torch Award for Lifetime Achievement in Engineering, bestowed by the National Society of Black Engineers.

On 19 September 1997, the W.E. Henry Symposium Compendium was held at Lawrence Berkeley National Laboratory. The event was held to honor Henry's career and achievements, and included speakers such as Glenn Seaborg, Arthur Thorpe, Ronald Mickens, and Sylvester James Gates. The compendium was organized by Harry Morison, Hattie Carwell, Harry Reed, Keith Jackson and Robert Bragg.

In 1999, his alma mater, the University of Chicago, awarded Henry a professional achievement citation to recognize his contributions to cryogenics and magnetism.
