= Linda Brown =

Linda Brown may refer to:

- Linda Carol Brown (1943–2018), daughter of plaintiff Oliver Brown known for the landmark court case Brown v. Board of Education
- Linda Beatrice Brown (born 1939), African American author and educator

== See also ==
- Rae Linda Brown (1953–2017), American musicologist
