= Phyllis Worthy Dawkins =

American academic administrator

18th President of Bennett College
- In office July 2017 – June 2019
- Preceded by: Rosalind Fuse-Hall
- Succeeded by: Gwendolyn O’Neal (interim)

Personal details
- Born: Phyllis Delores Worthy; 1953 (age 72–73)
- Children: 2
- Education: Johnson C. Smith University; University of Michigan; Ohio State University

Phyllis Worthy Dawkins (born 1953) is an American academic administrator who served as the 18th president of Bennett College from 2017 to 2019. She was previously the provost at Cheyney University of Pennsylvania where she also served as the acting president in 2014.

== Life ==
Phyllis Delores Worthy was born in 1953. She earned a B.S. at Johnson C. Smith University. She completed a M.A. from University of Michigan. She earned a Ph.D. from Ohio State University. Her 1984 dissertation was titled, An Analysis of Fundamental Motor Skills of Urban Black and Urban White Children of Middle Childhood Age. Walter F. Ersing was her doctoral advisor.

Dawkins worked at Johnson C. Smith University for over 28 years. Roles she held there included chief academic/administrative officer/dean of the College of Professional Studies, interim vice president for academic affairs, and professor of physical education. She joined Dillard University in 2009 where she served as the provost, senior vice president for academic affairs, and professor of education. On August 5, 2013, she became the provost and senior vice president for academic affairs at Cheyney University of Pennsylvania. Dawkins succeeded interim provost Bernadette Carter. She served as its acting president in 2014.

In November 2015, Dawkins joined the faculty at Bennett College as its provost and vice president for academic affairs. Following the resignation of Rosalind Fuse-Hall, she became its interim president in August 2016. She was selected as its 18th president in July 2017. She stepped down in June 2019 and was succeeded by interim president Gwendolyn O’Neal. On December 11, 2019, she became a national senior fellow to the Council Exchange Board of Trade. She is vice co-chair of the Goddard College board of trustees.

Dawkins has two daughters with her husband, Bobby G. Dawkins.
