= Gwendolyn O'Neal =

American academic administrator

President of Bennett College
- Interim
- In office June 21, 2019 – August 1, 2019
- Preceded by: Phyllis Worthy Dawkins
- Succeeded by: Suzanne Elise Walsh

Personal details
- Born: 1946
- Died: June 12, 2024
- Education: Bennett College; University of North Carolina at Greensboro; Ohio State University

Gwendolyn Sneed O'Neal (1946 – June 12, 2024) was an American academic administrator and home economist who served as the interim president of Bennett College in 2019. She was a professor and head of the Department of Consumer, Apparel, and Retail Studies at the University of North Carolina at Greensboro, retiring in 2014. O'Neal was president of the International Textiles and Apparel Association and of the National Coalition for Black Development in Home Economics.

== Life ==
O'Neal was born in 1946. She earned her B.S. from Bennett College in 1970. In 1971, she completed her M.Ed. at the University of North Carolina at Greensboro (UNCG). From 1971 to 1975, she served as an instructor of clothing and related arts at Bennett College. O'Neal completed her Ph.D. in home economics at The Ohio State University in 1977, concentrating in textiles and clothing. Her dissertation was titled Clothing Effects as Nonverbal Communication on Credibility of the Message Source in Advertising. Mary Lapitsky was her doctoral advisor.

O'Neal joined Bennett College as an assistant professor of home economics in 1977. In 1986, she joined the faculty at The Ohio State University to teach in the Department of Textiles and Clothing. She received tenure at OSU, leaving in the early 1990s to head the Department of Apparel, Textiles, and Interior Design at Kansas State University. O'Neal later became a professor and head of the Department of Consumer, Apparel, and Retail Studies at UNCG. In November 2003, she was designated a fellow of the International Textile and Apparel Association. O'Neal was president of the International Textiles and Apparel Association (2004) and of the National Coalition for Black Development in Home Economics. She retired from UNCG in 2014. O’Neal left retirement to succeed Bennett College's President Phyllis Worthy Dawkins as interim president on June 21, 2019, and was succeeded by Suzanne Elise Walsh on August 1. O'Neal continued on as the chief operating officer.

O’Neal was a member of the Mount Zion Baptist Church in Greensboro. She died on June 12, 2024.
