= Edith Player Brown =

American artist

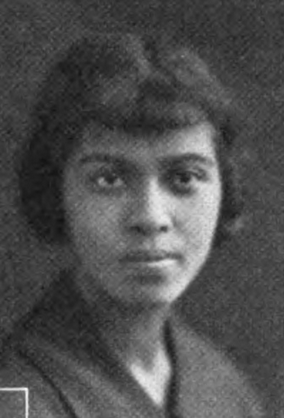
- Edith Player at age 17, from a 1925 issue of The Crisis
- Born: Edith Amelia Player; December 14, 1907; Jackson, Mississippi, U.S.
- Died: November 5, 1999; Greensboro, North Carolina, U.S.
- Occupation(s): Musician, artist, arts educator
- Children: 3, including Linda Beatrice Brown
- Relatives: Willa Beatrice Player (sister)

Edith Player Brown (December 14, 1907 – November 5, 1999), born Edith Amelia Player, was an American musician, artist, and arts educator in Akron, Ohio.

== Early life ==
Edith Amelia Player was born in Jackson, Mississippi, the daughter of Clarence Cromwell Player and Beatrice Day Player. The Player family moved to Akron in 1917, as part of the Great Migration. In 1925, at age 17, she won a statewide "music memory contest", and a scholarship to Ohio Wesleyan University. She graduated from Ohio Wesleyan in 1929; she also attended Oberlin Conservatory of Music. Her younger sister was Willa Beatrice Player (1909–2003), who became president of Bennett College.

== Career ==
Edith Player trained as a pianist, played organ at church services, and taught piano for much of her life, in private lessons and as music director with the Association for Colored Community Work. She also provided music at women's club meetings in the 1930s, and in 1935 she accompanied a chorus at an anti-lynching mass meeting in Akron. She composed the music for the Bennett College alma mater.

Brown began painting seriously in mid-life, had a one-woman show of abstract works in 1965, and had paintings in the collections of the Akron Art Museum, the Akron-Summit County Public Library, and Bennett College. She taught painting classes at Bennett College and the Akron Art Institute, and moved into multimedia techniques in later years, incorporating collaged photographs and text into her paintings. She was active in the YWCA, the Urban League, and Alpha Kappa Alpha.

== Personal life ==
Edith Player married Raymond R. Brown, who was a social worker, a lecturer at the University of Akron, and an executive with the Urban League. They had four children; one of their daughters is author Linda Beatrice Brown. Her husband died in 1998, and she died in 1999, aged 91 years, at her daughter's home in Greensboro, North Carolina.
