= Alice Young =

Alice Young may refer to:

- Alse Young (1615–1647), or Alice Young, the first recorded instance of execution for witchcraft in the thirteen American colonies
- Alice Holloway Young (1923–2024), American pioneer in education
