= Beth A. Brown =

NASA astrophysicist

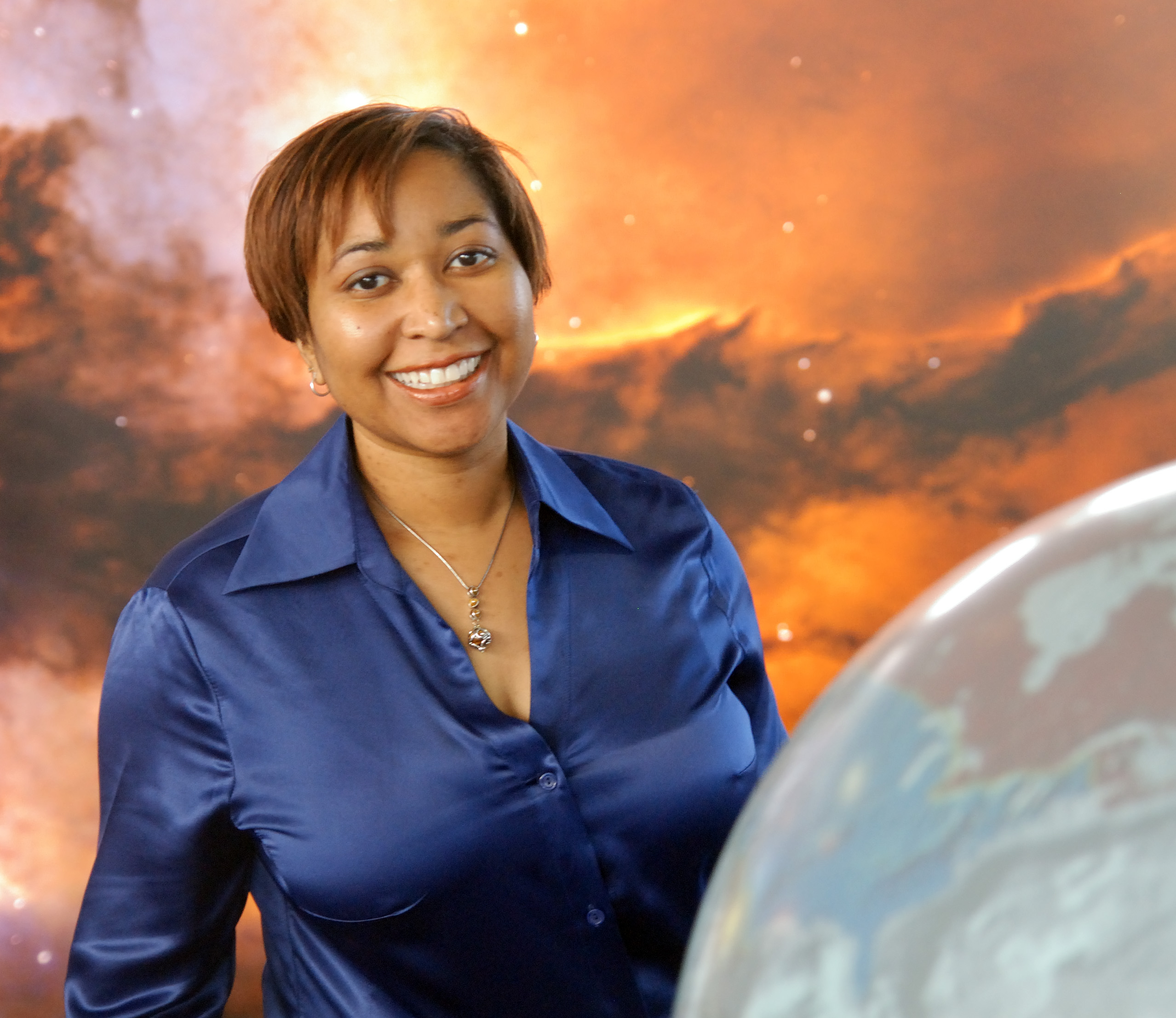
- Brown, NASA Goddard visitor center, 2008
- Born: February 4, 1969; Roanoke, Virginia
- Died: October 5, 2008 (aged 39)
- Education: Howard University, 1991; University of Michigan, M.S. in Astronomy, Ph.D., 1998
- Known for: Compiled and analyzed the first large complete sample of X-ray observations of elliptical galaxies.; The first African-American woman to earn a Ph.D. from the University of Michigan's Department of Astronomy.
- Scientific career
- Fields: Astrophysics
- Workplaces: Goddard Space Flight Center, National Space Science Data Center, Howard University

Beth A. Brown (February 4, 1969 – October 5, 2008) was a NASA astrophysicist with a research focus on X-ray observations of elliptical galaxies and black holes. She earned a Ph.D. in Astronomy from the University of Michigan in 1998, becoming the first African-American woman to do so.

== Early life ==
Brown was born in Roanoke, Virginia, in 1969. She loved Star Trek and Star Wars. She graduated from William Fleming High School in 1987 as valedictorian. When a high school assignment led her on a trip to an observatory, she saw the Ring Nebula through a telescope, which she cites as the moment she "got hooked on astronomy."

== Education ==
Brown studied astrophysics at Howard University, graduating summa cum laude in 1991. During her undergraduate years, she completed two internships at NASA. While at Howard University, she played piccolo in several University bands, and she joined Tau Beta Sigma in fall 1990. She earned her M.S. and Ph.D. in astronomy from the University of Michigan by 1998. She was the first African-American woman to earn a Ph.D. from the University of Michigan's Department of Astronomy. While at the University of Michigan, she began her efforts at public outreach in astronomy, leading tours of the local planetarium and developing a one-credit course in naked eye astronomy for students with no experience in astronomy; the course continues to be taught and remains popular today. Her research there concerned X-ray observations of elliptical galaxies from the Röntgen Satellite.

== Career and research ==
Brown joined NASA's Goddard Space Flight Center (GSFC) as a post-doctoral research associate with the National Academy of Sciences/National Research Council. She became a post-doctoral research associate for the National Space Science Data Center (NSSDC) in 2001. She transferred to the X-ray Astrophysics Laboratory in 2005, providing support for the GSFC XMM Guest Observer Facility. She was hired as Assistant Director for Science Communication and Higher Education for the Sciences and Exploration Director at Goddard. She also completed a NASA Administrator Fellowship where she devoted a year to research with James Lindesay and taught classes with Demetrius Venable at Howard's Department of Physics and Astronomy. Brown served as the Administrative Executive Officer for National Society of Black Physicists (NSBP) for two years and was involved with the National Conference of Black Physics Students (NCBPS).

Following her Ph.D., Brown held a National Academy of Science & National Research Council Postdoctoral Research Fellowship at NASA's Goddard Space Flight Center. Subsequently, she served at the National Space Science Data Center at Goddard, where she was involved in data archival activities as well as education and outreach. In 2006, Brown became an Astrophysics Fellow at Goddard, during which time she worked as a visiting Assistant Professor at Howard University. At Goddard, she was NSSDC's primary interface to such Science Archive Research Centers (SARCs) as the High Energy Astrophysics SARC at Goddard, the Multi-Mission Archive at STScI (MAST) and the Infrared Science Archive (IRSA) at Caltech. She also helped to "rationalize" NSSDC's legacy holdings of astrophysics data in light of data supported at the SARCs which are also to be permanently archived at NSSDC. At the time of her death, she was looking forward to a new position at GSFC as the Assistant Director for Science Communications and Higher Education.

== Awards and honors ==
The American Astronomical Society has an award in Brown's honor for a students with poster or oral presentations at the annual National Society of Black Physicists meeting. She is featured in the book, Women of Goddard: Careers in Science, Technology, Engineering & Mathematics.

== Death ==
Brown died unexpectedly on October 5, 2008, at the age of 39 from a pulmonary embolism.
