= Herman Branson =

American physicist

Herman Russell Branson
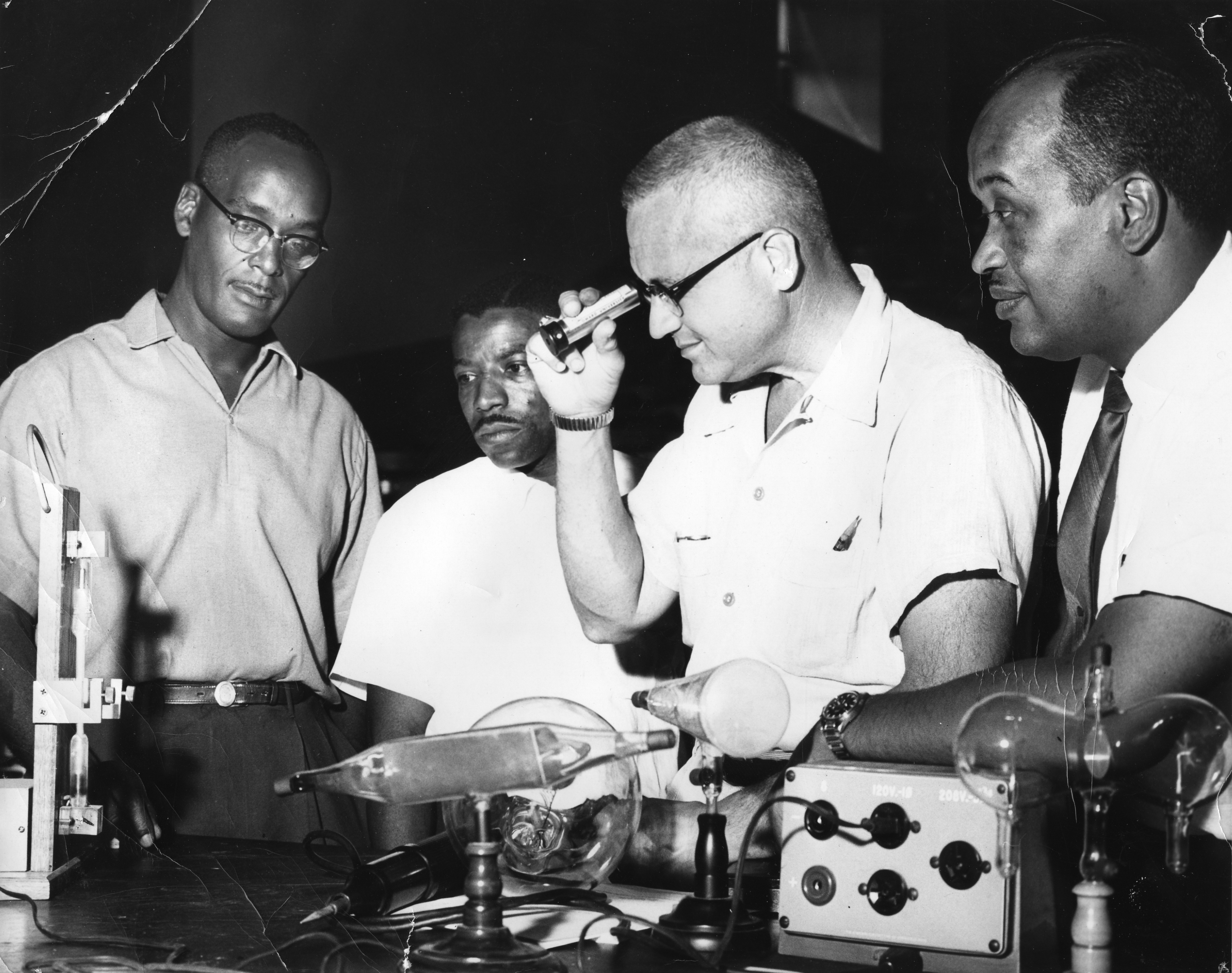
- Branson, right, at Morgan State University c. 1960
- Born: Herman Russell Branson; August 14, 1914; Pocahontas, Virginia, U.S.
- Died: June 7, 1995 (aged 80)
- Education: Virginia State College; New York University; University of Cincinnati
- Known for: Research on the α protein structure
- Scientific career
- Fields: Physics, Biochemistry
- Workplaces: Dillard University; Howard University; California Institute of Technology; Central State University; Lincoln University
- Thesis: I. The effects of soft x-rays on Tubifex Tubifex, II. The construction and operation of an x-ray intensity measuring device, III. The quantization of mass. (1939)
- Doctoral advisor: Boris Padolsky
- Doctoral students: Titus Pankey; Arthur Thorpe

Herman Russell Branson (August 14, 1914 – June 7, 1995) was an American physicist, chemist, best known for his research on the α protein structure, and was also the president of two colleges. He received a fellowship from the Rosenwald Foundation. He was one of the first African American physicists to make crystallography the focus of his research.

== Early life ==
Branson, born in Pocahontas, VA to Gertude and Harry Branson, received his B.S. from Virginia State College in 1936, and his Ph.D. in physics from the University of Cincinnati, under the direction of Boris Podolsky, in 1939. His thesis was in three parts: the first involved the interaction of x-rays with Tubifex tubifex (or sludge worm); the second involving the design and construction of an X-ray intensity measuring device; and the third section on the quantization of mass using the Dirac Equation. After a stint at Dillard University, he joined Howard University in 1941 as an assistant professor of physics and chemistry. As a scientist, Branson made significant contributions to how proteins work, and how they contribute to diseases such as sickle cell anemia. He remained at Howard for 27 years, achieving increasingly important positions, eventually becoming head of the physics department, director of a program in experimental science and mathematics, and working on the Office of Naval Research and Atomic Energy Commission Projects in Physics at Howard University. One of his students would include Marie Maynard Daly who was the first woman of color in the United States to earn her doctorate in chemistry.

== Work on protein structure ==
In 1948, Branson took a leave and spent time at the California Institute of Technology, in the laboratory of the chemist Linus Pauling. There he was assigned work on the structure of proteins, specifically to use his mathematical abilities to determine possible helical structures that would fit both the available X-ray crystallography data and a set of chemical restrictions outlined by Pauling. After some months of work, Branson handed in a report narrowing the possible structures to two helices: a tighter coil Pauling termed α, and a looser helix called γ.α Branson then returned to Howard to work on other projects. Some months later he received a letter from Pauling along with a draft manuscript of a paper detailing the two helixes, with Branson listed as third author (after Pauling and his assistant Robert Corey, the laboratory's expert in transforming X-ray data into precise models). Pauling asked for suggestions. Branson replied in a letter that it was fine as written, approved submission to the Proceedings of the National Academy of Sciences, and asked for 25 preprints when published.

== Later career and controversy ==
Branson went on to a significant career, eventually serving as president of Central State University in Wilberforce, Ohio, from 1968 to 1970, and then president of Lincoln University until his retirement in 1985. He was active in increasing federal funding for higher education, and helped found the National Association for Equal Opportunity in Higher Education in 1990.

In 1984, Branson wrote Pauling biographers Victor and Mildred Goertzel implying that his contribution to the α helix had been greater than the final paper indicated. "I took my work to Pauling who told me that he thought they [the proposed α and γ helixes] were too tight, that he thought that a protein molecule should have a much larger radius so that water molecules could fit down inside and cause the protein to swell," he wrote. "I went back and worked unsuccessfully to find such a structure." When he received Pauling's note with the draft manuscript, Branson wrote, "I interpreted this letter as establishing that the α and γ in my paper were correct and that the subsequent work done was cleaning up or verifying. The differences were nil." He added in his letter to the Goertzels that he "resented" the later attention lavished on Pauling and Corey. The conservative watchdog group Accuracy in Media referred to the incident in an attack on Pauling in 1994. The available records, historical context, knowledge of the personalities involved, and studies of Pauling's laboratory and methods at the time have led most historians to accord greater credit to Pauling and Corey.
