= I. Patricia Henry =

I. Patricia Henry (born August 20, 1947) is the first African American woman to hold a lead management position at a major U.S. brewery (Miller Brewing Company now MillerCoors in Eden, NC.) In 1990, she became the first female brewmaster to head the plant's entire brewing process in Eden, NC; in 1995 she became the first African American and woman plant manager of any beer brewery in the United States.

== Early life ==
Patricia Henry was born in Martinsville, VA to Ida Walker Pinnix. She was raised in Reidsville, NC and graduated from high school in 1965. Henry attended Bennett College in Greensboro, NC, where she graduated summa cum laude in 1969 with a bachelor of science in chemistry. Henry also studied at the Siebel Institute of Brewing Technology and Harvard University.

== Career ==
After graduating from Bennett, Patricia began an accomplished career as a systems analyst working for such companies as General Electric Company, Norfolk and Western Railway and Ethyl Corporation.

When Henry was hired by the Miller Brewing Company in 1977 she became both the first African American and first woman brew master for a major American brewery. She held various positions in the company, including brewing supervisor, brewing superintendent, brewing unit manager, and production services manager. In 1995, she became the plant manager; in that position, she managed 878 employees and the plant produced 8 million barrels a year during her tenure. She oversaw technological changes and increased automation (e.g. robots in manufacturing) in a changing brewing industry. As of 1995 the plant was producing 9 million barrels a year.

When she retired, her title was Director of Strategic Projects.

Henry said that her gender and race didn't hinder her career. "I don't look at hurdles. I look above them ... I assume that the people I work with are looking at me as a co-worker and not as a female or an African American. I believe you get what you think about." However, while she worked in the brewing industry, she was aware it was traditionally dominated by men, but noted in 2002 that out of Miller's seven breweries, four were headed by African Americans and three by females.

Active after retirement, Henry was named to the BB&T corporate board in 2013.

== Accolades ==
Henry was featured in Jet and Ebony magazine, and was honored by Dollars and Sense magazine as one of the "Top 100 Black Business and Professional Women."

== Personal life ==
Henry is the divorced mother of two children, Hans and Tiffany.
