= Julianne Malveaux =

American journalist, economist, author, commentator (born 1953)

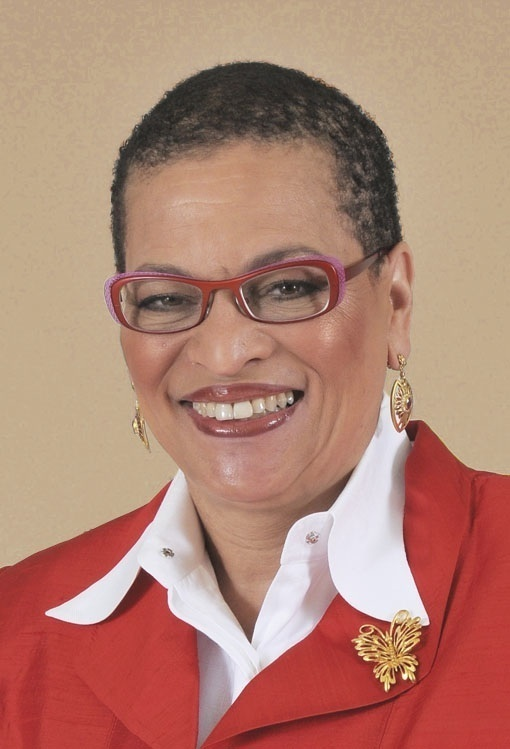
- Born: Julianne Marie Malveaux; September 22, 1953 (age 73); San Francisco, California, U.S.
- Education: Boston College (BA, MA); Massachusetts Institute of Technology (PhD)
- Occupations: Author, economist
- Employer: Bennett College
- Website: www.juliannemalveaux.com

Julianne Marie Malveaux (born September 22, 1953) is an American economist, author, social and political commentator, and businesswoman. After five years as the 15th president of Bennett College in Greensboro, North Carolina, she resigned on May 6, 2012.

== Early life and education ==
Raised Catholic, Malveaux entered Boston College after the 11th grade, and earned a BA and MA degrees in economics there in three years. She earned her PhD in economics from MIT in 1980. She also holds honorary degrees from Benedict College, Sojourner-Douglass College and the University of the District of Columbia.

== Career ==
As a writer and syndicated columnist, her work has appeared regularly in USA Today, Black Issues in Higher Education, Ms. magazine, Essence magazine, and The Progressive. Her weekly columns appear in numerous newspapers, including the Los Angeles Times, the Charlotte Observer, the New Orleans Tribune, the Detroit Free Press, and the San Francisco Examiner.

Malveaux appeared regularly on CNN, BET, as well as on Howard University's television show, Evening Exchange. She has appeared on PBS's To The Contrary, KQED's Forum, ABC’s Politically Incorrect, Fox News Channel's The O'Reilly Factor, and TV One's News One Now with Roland Martin and stations such as C-SPAN, MSNBC and CNBC.

On an October 22, 1994, flight from Detroit to Washington, Julianne Malveaux swore at a child who accidentally bumped her while she was asleep in her seat, then at a flight attendant who accidentally sprayed her with a can of soda when it opened. When another flight attendant asked her to put away her laptop before the plane landed, she grabbed the woman's arm. As a result of this she was arrested on landing and charged with assault; she was sentenced to probation.

She hosted talk radio programs in Washington, San Francisco, and New York, as well as a nationally broadcast, daily talk show that aired on the Pacifica Radio network from 1995 to 1996. She appeared on Black in America: Reclaiming the Dream, hosted by Soledad O'Brien as a panelist on CNN in 2008.

Currently, Malveaux serves on the boards of the Economic Policy Institute as well as the Black Doctoral Network, and she is president of PUSH Excel, the educational branch of the Rainbow PUSH Coalition. She is also the president and founder of Economic Education, a nonprofit located in Washington, DC.

In 1990, Malveaux, along with 15 other African-American women and men, formed the African-American Women for Reproductive Freedom.

She taught at San Francisco State University (1981–1985) and was a visiting professor at the University of California, Berkeley (1985–1992). She has been visiting faculty at the New School for Social Research, College of Notre Dame (San Mateo, California), Michigan State University, and Howard University. In 2014, she was a special guest lecturer at both Meharry Medical College, (Nashville, Tennessee) and in 2017, she delivered a three-part lecture as part of the Hutchins Center for African and African American Research at Harvard University's W. E. B. Du Bois lecture series.

On June 1, 2007, Malveaux became the 15th President of Bennett College for Women in Greensboro, North Carolina. In February 2012, Malveaux announced that she would be stepping down from this position in May 2012, saying in a statement: "While I remain committed to [historically black colleges and universities] and the compelling cause of access in higher education, I will actualize that commitment now in other arenas. I will miss Bennett College and will remain one of its most passionate advocates."

In 2021, Malveaux was appointed dean of the new college of Ethnic Studies at California State University, Los Angeles.

== Scholarship ==
Editor

- Voices of Vision: African American Women on the Issues (1996)

Co-editor

- Slipping Through the Cracks: The Status of Black Women (1986)
- The Paradox of Loyalty: An African American Response to the War on Terrorism (2002).

Author

- Sex, Lies, and Stereotypes: Perspectives of a Mad Economist (1994)
- Wall Street, Main Street, and the Side Street: A Mad Economist Takes a Stroll (1999)
- Surviving and Thriving: 365 Facts in Black Economic History (2010)
- Are We Better Off? Race, Obama, and Public Policy (2016)

Co-author

- Unfinished Business: A Democrat and A Republican Take On the 10 Most Important Issues Women Face (2002).
