= Arthur Thorpe (physicist) =

African American physicist

- Born: Arthur Nathaniel Thorpe; 26 April 1933; Durham, North Carolina
- Died: 30 June 2015 (aged 82); Washington, D.C.
- Other name: Pete
- Education: Howard University
- Scientific career
- Workplaces: Howard University
- Thesis: "Magnetic Properties of Pd,Pd-H, and Pd-D from 300K to 4.2K"
- Doctoral advisor: Herman Branson
- Notable students: Demetrius Venable

Arthur Nathaniel "Pete" Thorpe (26 April 1933 – 30 June 2015) was a physicist and professor at Howard University in Washington, D.C. He was the second student to receive a PhD in physics from Howard, and helped to establish a cooperative degree program between Howard University and other historically Black colleges and universities to increase access to physics education. Throughout his career, his research centered around condensed matter; solid state physics; the evaluation of superconducting materials for space application; and enhancing high-temperature superconductors.

== Early life and education ==
Arthur Thorpe was born to Chester Thorpe and Maggie Beasley on 26 April 1933 in Durham, North Carolina. He was raised in the Durham area and attended Hillside High School, where he graduated in 1950.

He received his bachelor's degree in 1954 from Howard University in Washington, D.C. The same year as he received his degree, he joined the United States Air Force, where he served as a fighter pilot until 1958. In 1959 he received his master's degree, and in 1964 he received his PhD in physics, both from Howard University. At Howard, he studied under Dr. Herman R. Branson, who had created the graduate physics program at the university. His thesis was titled "Magnetic Properties of Pd,Pd-H, and Pd-D from 300K to 4.2K." Thorpe was Branson's second student to complete the PhD program, making him the second student to receive a physics PhD at Howard, following Titus Pankey in 1962.

== Career ==
After completing his graduate studies and receiving his PhD, Thorpe was appointed an assistant professor at Howard University. From 1969 to 1971, he served as the assistant dean of the graduate school, and in 1971, he was promoted to full professor of physics. He also served as chairman of the physics department from 1971 until 1979.

Between 1964 and 1975 he also worked closely with the United States Geological Survey, publishing frequently with geophysicist Frank E. Senftle.

As a professor, Thorpe helped establish the Cooperative Education Physics (CEP) program at Howard University, which aimed to bring advanced physics instruction to other historically Black colleges and universities. Along with Dr. Leslie Speller and Anne Cooke, Thorpe gained funding through Title III to establish the program, and he served as its director for the duration of the program's run between 1974 and 1980. At the time, Dr. Willa Player was the Director of the Division of College Support in the United States Department of Health, Education and Welfare, and helped the program secure funding along with program officers Audrey Dickerson and Anita Ford Allen.

The program allowed students at historically Black colleges and universities that did not offer a physics degree to take introductory physics courses at their home institution. Partner schools received funds for physics laboratories and to fund professors to teach the introductory physics courses. The students would then spend two summers at Howard University to take advanced physics courses, and eventually receive an undergraduate degree in physics from their home university. The program started with 12 partner universities and eventually reached about 40, and over 100 students participated over the course of the program, with their tuition at Howard, travel, and room and board paid for. Thorpe and Speller would visit the partner institutions multiple times a year, sometimes transporting physics equipment on Thorpe's private plane.

In 1993, Thorpe became the director of Howard University's Center for the Study of Terrestrial and Extraterrestrial Atmospheres (CSTEA), which was funded by NASA and had a major focus on student training. Along with Thorpe as its director, Dr. Vernon R. Morris served as the center's deputy director.

Over his career, Thorpe published over 93 articles in journals such as the Journal of Geophysical Research, the Physical Review, the Journal of Radiation Effects, and Science. He continued to teach at Howard University until his death in 2015.

== Personal life ==
Thorpe was married to Wanda Thorpe, and they had five children.

Thorpe was an accomplished pilot and air mechanic, and continued to fly and work on planes after his service in the Air Force. During part of his career at Howard, he would commute from North Carolina to campus via his personal plane. He was also involved in Wheeler Airlines, the first Black-owned airline certificated in the US by the FAA.
