= Frances Jones Bonner =

American psychoanalyst

Frances Estelle Jones Bonner
- Born: 1919; St. Louis, Missouri, United States
- Died: December 27, 2000 (aged 80–81)
- Education: Bennett College; Boston University
- Awards: Helen Putnam Fellowship
- Scientific career
- Fields: Psychoanalysis
- Workplaces: Massachusetts General Hospital
- Academic advisors: R. Nathaniel Dett; Willa Beatrice Player

Frances Jones Bonner (1919 - December 27, 2000) was an American psychoanalyst.

== Early life and education ==
Frances Estelle Jones was born in 1919 in St. Louis, Missouri. Her parents were David Dallas Jones and Susie Pearl Willams. Bonner's family moved to Greensboro, North Carolina in 1926 when her father became President of Bennett College for Women. Her mother worked as an administrator at Bennett College. After graduating high school, Bonner enrolled at Bennett College. She was very active in school activities and played on Bennett's basketball team. During her undergraduate tenure in 1937, Bonner led a protest and boycott of the downtown Greensboro movie theaters because of the depictions of black women in film. Her advisors during this protest were R. Nathaniel Dett and future college President Willa Beatrice Player. After graduating from Bennett College in 1939, she went on to study abroad for a one year. Upon returning, Bonner was accepted to Boston University medical school where she graduated in 1943. She trained as a neurologist at Boston City Hospital, completing her training in 1949.

== Career ==
After completing her neurology training at Boston City Hospital, Bonner was hired at Massachusetts General Hospital in 1949 becoming the first African American woman to train and to become a faculty member at the hospital. During her time at MGH, she became the first winner of the Helen Putnam Fellowship from Radcliffe College. She worked at MGH for 50 years. In 1975 Bonner co-founded the Psychoanalytic Institute of New England.

== Death and legacy ==
Bonner died on December 27, 2000. Massachusetts General Hospital named the Frances J. Bonner, MD Award after her.
