= Joyce Martin Dixon =

Joyce Martin Dixon is an American businesswoman and philanthropist.

== Career ==
Joyce Martin was born in Greensboro, North Carolina, where she lived with her family as a child on McConnell Road. She graduated from James B. Dudley High School in 1952, and Bennett College in 1956. Her mother and both her sisters had also attended Bennett College.

After leaving college, Martin moved to Florida. Alongside her husband Jacob Dixon, an electrical engineer who had worked on the NASA space shuttle program, she was co-founder and co-owner of Creative Management Technology, Inc., a contracting firm based in Cocoa Beach, Florida, which provided services to government agencies, especially NASA, for many years, and grew to employ 550 people. The couple sold the company shortly before Jacob Dixon's death in 2004.

Martin Dixon moved back to Greensboro in 2006. In 2011 she donated $1 million to her alma mater, Bennett College, to pay for the Martin Dixon Intergenerational Center, a laboratory preschool used by elementary education majors and other academics researching young children and early years education, built on the exact site where her father had run a barber shop in the 1940s. This donation was the largest alumna donation in the college's history, and Martin Dixon has continued to fund additional improvements and other projects related to the center, including a 14-seat schoolbus in 2015. She received an Honorary Doctorate of Humane Letters from Bennett College for her philanthropy, as well as a "Woman of Substance" award. Dixon has served as chair of the Brevard Community College Board of Trustees, Vice Chair of the Astronauts Memorial Foundation Board, Director of the Southern Area Links, Inc. and President of the Cocoa Beach Women’s Golf Association. She currently serves on Hayes Taylor Memorial YMCA Board of Management. She was awarded the United Negro College Fund's "Outstanding Alumna" award, and was named as Brevard County's "Woman of Distinction".

== Personal life ==
Joyce Martin married Jacob Dixon, her childhood sweetheart, and they had two children. Her daughter Janice Gail died in 1961, aged five, of purpura, a form of leukemia. Martin Dixon set up an organ and tissue donation awareness program in her memory named Linkages to Life. Her son Jacob, a pilot in the US Air Force died in July 1982 in a plane crash in Wichita Falls, Texas, aged 27, and his parents established a scholarship fund at the school where he graduated in Wiesbaden, Germany. Jacob Dixon Snr. died aged 73 in 2004.
