= Gloria Randle Scott =

American educator

Gloria Randle Scott (born Gloria Dean on April 14, 1938, in Houston, Texas) is an American educator and the first African-American to be elected as president of the Girl Scouts of the USA.

Scott was born and raised in Texas and graduated from Yates High School in 1955. Graduating in 1959, she became the first African-American to receive a degree in zoology from Indiana University Bloomington. She also received a Ph.D. in Higher Education from Indiana University Bloomington in 1965. She was president of the Girl Scouts from 1975 to 1978 and remains on the board of directors. She was president of Bennett College, serving from 1987 until in 2001. In 1993, Gloria Randall Scott was elected to the Common Cause National Governing Board.

Scott is a member of Delta Sigma Theta sorority.

Scott was featured in Pulitzer-Prize-winning-photographer Brian Lanker's 1989 photobook I Dream A World: Portraits of Black Women who Changed America.

== See also ==
- Juliette Gordon Low
