= Titus Pankey =

African-American physicist

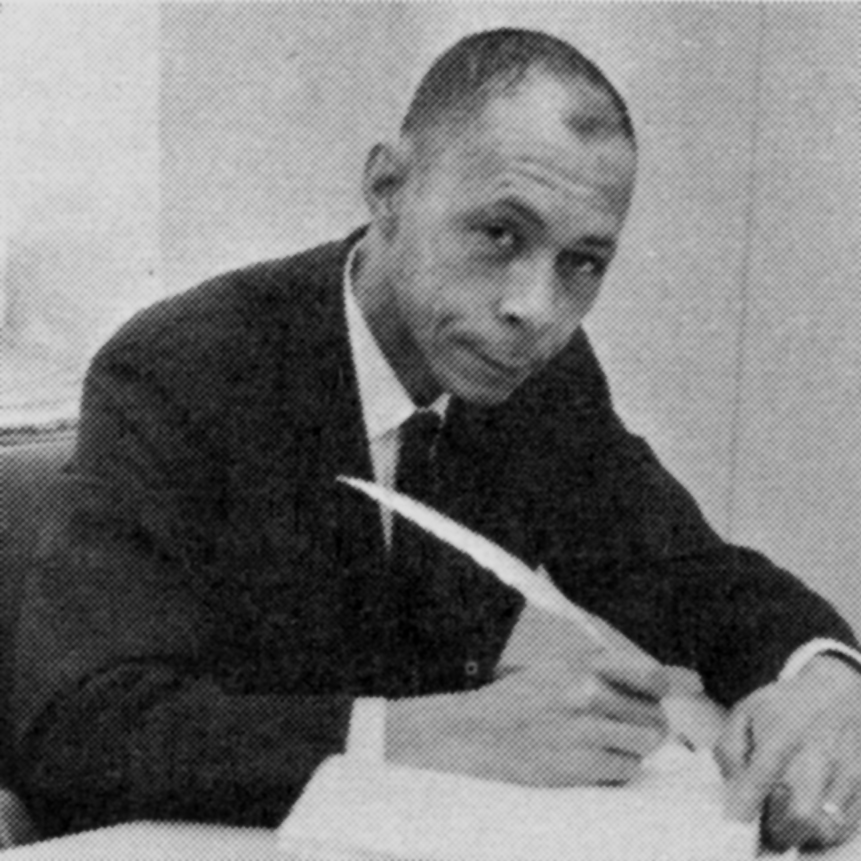
- Born: Titus Pankey, Jr. 20 November 1925; Hinton, West Virginia
- Died: September 20, 2003 (aged 77); Charlottesville, Virginia
- Education: Howard University
- Known for: Type Ia supernova light curve
- Scientific career
- Fields: Nuclear physics Magnetism; Cosmology
- Workplaces: Howard University
- Thesis: [ProQuest 302073367 "Possible Thermonuclear Activities in Natural Terrestrial Minerals"] (1962)
- Doctoral advisor: Herman Branson

Titus Pankey (November 20, 1925 – September 20, 2003) was an American physicist and professor whose research specialties were magnetic susceptibility and cosmology, especially supernovae. He was the first recipient of a PhD in physics from Howard University, and was one of the first 10 black recipients of a PhD in physics in the United States. He has been cited as the first to suggest that Type Ia supernovae are powered by nickel-56 decay.

== Early life and military service ==
Titus Pankey, Jr., was born in 1925 in Hinton, West Virginia. He grew up between Hinton and Charlottesville, Virginia, where he also graduated from high school. After graduation from high school, he worked as a Pullman porter on the Chesapeake & Ohio Railway, and helped to fund his four sisters' college educations. He later worked in an electrophoresis lab at the University of Virginia Hospital in Charlottesville. He served in the U.S. Army during the Korean War and was discharged in 1954 after completing his tour of duty. While serving in the Army's 65th Infantry Regiment, 3rd division, Pankey earned two battle stars and the Combat Infantryman's Badge.

== Education ==
After completing his service, Pankey attended Howard University in Washington, D.C., as an undergraduate and graduated magna cum laude with a degree in physics.

Pankey subsequently received his master's and PhD degrees from Howard in physics, completing his doctorate in 1962. With the completion of his degree, Pankey became the first recipient of a physics PhD from Howard University.

His dissertation advisor was Herman Branson, and the title of Pankey's thesis was "Possible Thermonuclear Activities in Natural Terrestrial Minerals," submitted on 26 July 1961. Branson also advised, among others, the second Howard physics PhD holder, Arthur Thorpe, who received his degree two years after Pankey in 1964. Pankey's research was supported by the U.S. Geological Survey and Frank E. Senftle, and his advisory committee composed of Branson, Sohan Singh, Louis G. Swaby, and Stanton L. Wormley. Wormley was then the acting dean of the graduate school at Howard.

In March 1958, he was one of sixteen Howard students elected to the Phi Beta Kappa honors society. In May 1958, he was elected into an associate membership to the Sigma Xi national science honors society.

== Career ==
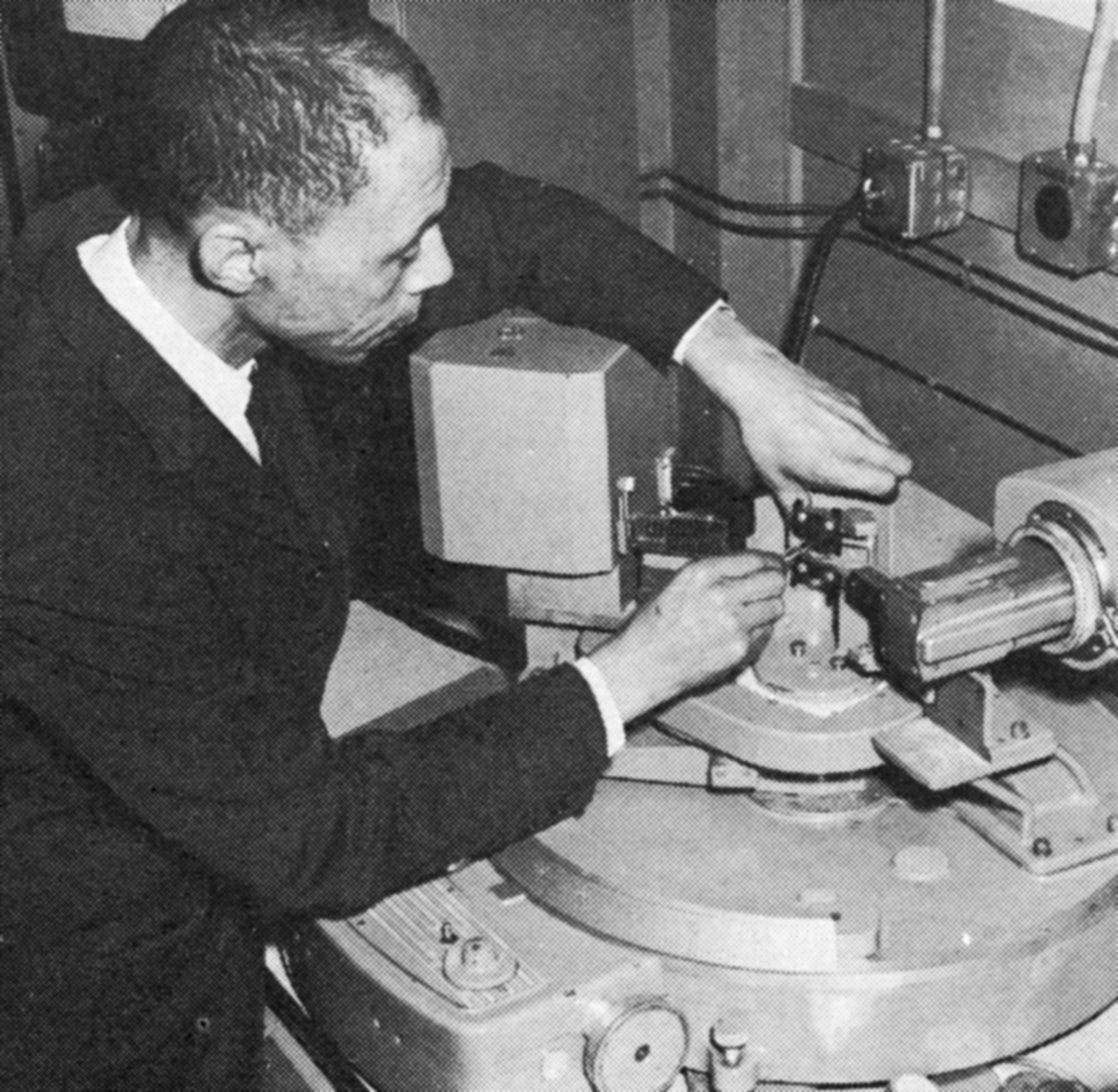
Pankey in the U.S. Naval Research Laboratory, circa 1964

The radioactive decays of nickel-56 and cobalt-56 that produce a supernova visible light curve

In his graduate thesis, Pankey investigated whether nuclear fusion in the Earth's interior is a possible source of the Earth's internal heat, specifically by measuring the magnetic susceptibility and iron content of rocks. While radiogenic heating in the Earth is now understood to be due to decay processes rather than fusion, Pankey's thesis is significant for including a suggestion that radioactive decay of nickel-56 is responsible for powering Type Ia supernova light curves. Pankey speculated that the two stages of decay in the light curve are caused by radioactive nickel-56 rapidly decaying to cobalt-56 with a 6 day half-life followed by cobalt-56 decaying more slowly decaying to stable iron-56 with a 77 day half-life. This is the first example of the now-accepted theoretical explanation for Type Ia supernova, and his thesis includes the earliest known example of a modern Type Ia light curve. His hypothesis was not widely circulated and did not get immediate attention at the time, but would later be independently reinvented and developed in detail in a 1969 article by Stirling Colgate and Chester McKee. In 2014, the first direct observational evidence for the theory was gathered, confirming Pankey's initial hypothesis.

In 1957, while attending graduate school, Pankey began work at the United States Naval Research Laboratory as a research physicist and cosmologist. While at the Naval Research Laboratory, he worked with John E. Davey and published widely on material science and semi-conductor physics. The pair made significant contributions to molecular-beam epitaxy by demonstrating how to grow gallium arsenide films in vacuum chambers. The pair also submitted a patent for a method of forming gallium phosphide coatings in 1969. In 1977, Pankey and Richard E. Thomas submitted a patent for a controlled-porosity dispenser cathode.

After completing his doctorate in 1962, Pankey became an associate professor of physics at Howard University. He taught at Howard until 1979, when he suffered a brain injury during a robbery and assault at his home in Washington, D.C. After recovering from the assault, he continued to conduct physics research at his home.

== Personal life ==
Pankey was married to Anita-Rae Smith-Pankey, and the couple later divorced. They had five children. Around 1980, he left Washington, D.C., and moved back to the Charlottesville area where he lived until his death.

== Publications ==
- "Anomalous Beta Decay in Type-I Supernovae," Publications of the Astronomical Society of the Pacific, Vol. 92, No. 549 (October 1980)
- "Magnetic Susceptibility of Tetragonal Titanium Dioxide," Physical Review 120, 820 – Published 1 November 1960 with Frank E. Senftle from the U.S. Geological Survey and Frank A. Grant from the National Bureau of Standards
- "Polymorphism in Vacuum-Deposited GaP Films," Applied Physics Letters 12, 38 (1968), published with John E. Davey
- "Antiferromagnetism of UO2·2H2O," The Journal of Chemical Physics 39, 1702 (1963), published with Frank E. Senftle and Frank Cuttitta
- "Tidal gravimeter employing magnetic suspension", Review of Scientific Instruments, Vol. 47, No.6, June 1976, published with Arthur Thorpe and F. Marsh
