= Suzanne Elise Walsh =

American academic administrator

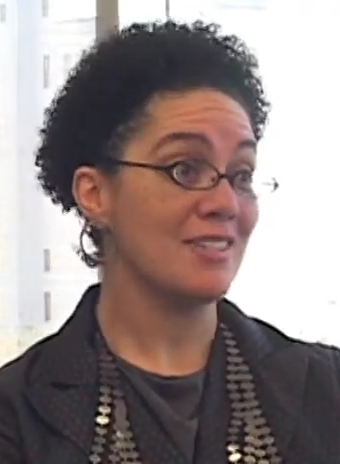
- Walsh in 2012

19th President of Bennett College
- In office August 1, 2019 – June 30, 2025
- Preceded by: Gwendolyn O'Neal (interim)
- Succeeded by: Ronald L. Carter (acting)

Personal details
- Born: 1968/1969 (age 57–58)
- Education: Hudson Valley Community College; Cornell University; Case Western Reserve University

Suzanne Elise Walsh is an American academic administrator who previously served as the 19th president of Bennett College.

== Biography ==
Walsh was born in 1968 or 1969.

Walsh earned an associate degree in applied science from Hudson Valley Community College.

Walsh earned an undergraduate degree in social work from Cornell University. She completed a M.S.W. and J.D. from Case Western Reserve University.

Walsh worked at the Heinz Endowments.

Until 2018, Walsh was the deputy director of postsecondary education at the Bill & Melinda Gates Foundation.

In 2018, Walsh stepped down from the Foundation to work as an independent consultant, founding Discerning SEWLutions, LLC.

In 2019, Walsh resided in Seattle.

On August 1, 2019, Walsh became the 19th president of Bennett College, succeeding interim president Gwendolyn O'Neal. She stepped down in June 2025.

In 2022, she joined the national advisory board of the Institute for Emerging Issues. She was no longer listed as a board member as of 2025.
