= Alice Holloway Young =

American educator (1923–2024)

- Born: Alice Holloway; September 29, 1923; Wise, North Carolina, U.S.
- Died: April 30, 2024 (aged 100); Rochester, New York, U.S.
- Education: Bennett College; University of Rochester
- Occupation: Educator
- Employer: Rochester City School District
- Known for: Education pioneer and administrator in Rochester, New York
- Spouse: Adam Varga
- Children: 4
- Awards: Liberty Medal (New York State Senate)

Alice Holloway Young (September 29, 1923 – April 30, 2024) was an American pioneer in education who served as a teacher, advocate, and administrator in Rochester, New York, from the 1950s until the 2020s. Young was one of the Rochester City School District's first Black classroom teachers, as well as the district's first Black reading specialist, vice principal, and principal. Young developed the first and oldest voluntary racial integration program in the United States and was also a founding trustee of Monroe Community College.

== Early life ==
Young was born on September 29, 1923, in Wise, Warrenton County, North Carolina, to John Amos Holloway and Lucy (née Allen) Holloway.

== Education ==
Young graduated as valedictorian of her high school class when she was 15 years old. She continued on to Bennett College, an all-women's college in Greensboro, North Carolina. Young again graduated as valedictorian with her B.S. degree in childhood development and family relations.

Years later, after beginning her career, Young completed graduate studies at the University of Rochester. In 1952, she earned her M.S. degree in education supervision and administration. In 1969, she completed her Ph.D. in education supervision and administration.

== Career ==
After graduating from Bennett College, Young moved north to begin working at a migrant camp in Poolville, New York. She established a preschool childcare center and taught nutrition to adults.

At the end of the workday, Young taught the migrants how to write their names and do basic math. Young credits this experience with showing her that literacy is essential to lift people out of poverty. As a result, she decided to become a teacher and moved to Rochester, New York with a friend.

=== Rochester City School District ===
Young joined the Rochester City School District (RCSD) in 1952 as one of its first Black teachers. After Young showed success in motivating students who could not read, RCSD promoted her to vice principal of School No. 19 in 1958 to teach her techniques to other teachers. From 1962 to 1965, Young served as principal of Ellwanger & Barry School No. 24. Young was the first Black person to serve in these leadership positions in RCSD.

In 1965, Young became RCSD's first Title I director, working to integrate schools and supervise federal anti-poverty and desegregation funding. She wrote and supervised the district's Urban-Suburban Interdistrict Transfer Program—the first and oldest voluntary desegregation program in the United States. As of March 2024, the Urban-Suburban Program is still active.

Young retired from RCSD in 1985.

=== Monroe Community College ===
In 1961, Young joined the founding board of trustees at Monroe Community College, the only woman and only Black person on the board. She shaped the direction of the college as chair of the board from 1978 to 1998 and continued to attend board meetings until 2021. Young was the longest-serving trustee in the State University of New York.

== Personal life and death ==
Young married James Taylor Young Sr. and had four children: James Jr., Rodney, Calvin, and Kathleen. She died in Rochester on April 30, 2024, at the age of 100.

== Awards ==
- Liberty Medal (New York State Senate)
- Civic Award for Meritorious Contributions in the Field of Education (Rochester Area Chamber of Commerce)
- Distinguished Community Service Award (Urban League of Rochester)
- Anne M. Bushnell Memorial Award for Special Achievement (highest honor conferred by the State University of New York Association of the Boards of Trustees of Community Colleges)
- The Charles Force Hutchison and Marjorie Smith Hutchison Medal (University of Rochester)

== Legacy ==
Numerous programs and buildings have been named in Young's honor, including:

- Dr. Alice Holloway Young School of Excellence in Rochester, NY (renamed from Nathaniel Rochester Middle School in 2021)
- The Alice Holloway Young Commons (student residence halls at MCC)
- The Alice H. Young Teaching Internship for Ethnic Minority Graduate students at MCC (established in 1987)
- The Alice Holloway Young Society for Charitable Giving of the MCC Foundation
