= Demetrius Venable =

American physicist

- Born: Demetrius Dante Venable; 11 October 1947 (age 78); Powhatan, Virginia
- Education: Virginia State University; American University
- Scientific career
- Workplaces: Howard University
- Thesis: "Multiphoton excitation in solids" (1974)
- Doctoral advisor: Richard Kay

Demetrius Dante Venable (born 11 October 1947) is an American physicist and professor emeritus at Howard University in Washington, D.C. Over his career, he has specialized in optical physics, and is known for establishing and developing physics programs at multiple historically Black universities.

== Early life and education ==
Demetrius Venable was born in Powhatan, Virginia. His father and mother were raised in Virginia, and his maternal extended family also resides in Powhatan. Venable's father James Venable was a schoolteacher and principal of Pocahontas High School from 1967 to 1975. Pocahontas High School was Powhatan's segregated high school for Black students that served 8th through 12th graders. In high school Venable took courses in mathematics and history and government with his father; however, at the time there were no physics courses offered at the school. While in high school, he attended a National Science Foundation summer program at Norfolk State University in Norfolk, Virginia, where he was introduced to set theory. Venable graduated from Pocahontas High School in 1966.

Venable attended Virginia State College (now Virginia State University), a historically Black college located in Petersburg, Virginia. He participated in ROTC during college. He received his BS in physics in 1970. As an undergraduate in 1968 and 1969, he participated in the Harvard-Yale-Columbia-Intensive Summer Studies Program at Columbia University, where he studied in the intermediate physics lab working on classical physics experiments at the university and worked with professor Lucy J. Hayner. While at Virginia State as an undergraduate, he also worked with physicists Arthur Thorpe and James Davenport, who was the physics department chairperson at the time.

In 1972 he received his MS in physics from American University in Washington, D.C., and in 1974 he received his PhD, also from American University.

== Career ==
After receiving his PhD, Venable worked in the private sector for two years as a senior associate engineer at IBM in Fishkill, New York. He then became an assistant professor of physics at Saint Paul's College in Lawrenceville, Virginia. There, he also helped develop a cooperative physics program with Howard University, where students from Saint Paul's would attend summer courses at Howard. During summers, he completed fellowships with the Air Force Office of Scientific Research (AFOSR) at the Brooks Air Force Base in San Antonio, Texas, and at NASA Langley, where he began work in remote sensing.

After two years at Saint Paul's, in 1978 Venable was appointed assistant professor of physics at Hampton Institute (which was renamed Hampton University in 1984). At Hampton, he was eventually appointed to full professor and served in numerous leadership roles, including: department chairman; dean of the graduate college; vice president for research; and executive vice president and provost. He also helped establish Hampton University's graduate program in physics.

In July 1995 Venable joined the faculty at Howard University as a professor and department chair. From December 1999 to July 2000, he also served as the interim associate provost for research. At Howard, he helped develop the university's interdisciplinary atmospheric science program, and was the deputy director of the Howard University Beltsville Center for Climate System Observation, funded by NASA.

Throughout his career, he has participated in various professional organizations, including the National Society of Black Physicists, the American Association of Physics Teachers, and the Virginia Academy of Science, among others.

He officially retired from Howard in 2017.

== Personal life ==
Venable met his wife while attending the Summer Studies program at Columbia University. They have two children.

== Awards ==
- American Association of Physics Teacher's Distinguished Service Citation
- NASA's Distinguished Public Service Medal
- NASA Jet Propulsion Laboratory Group Achievement Award
- Lifetime Achievement Award Finalist of The Benjamin Banneker Institute (2008)
