= Willa Beatrice Player =

American educator and civil rights activist

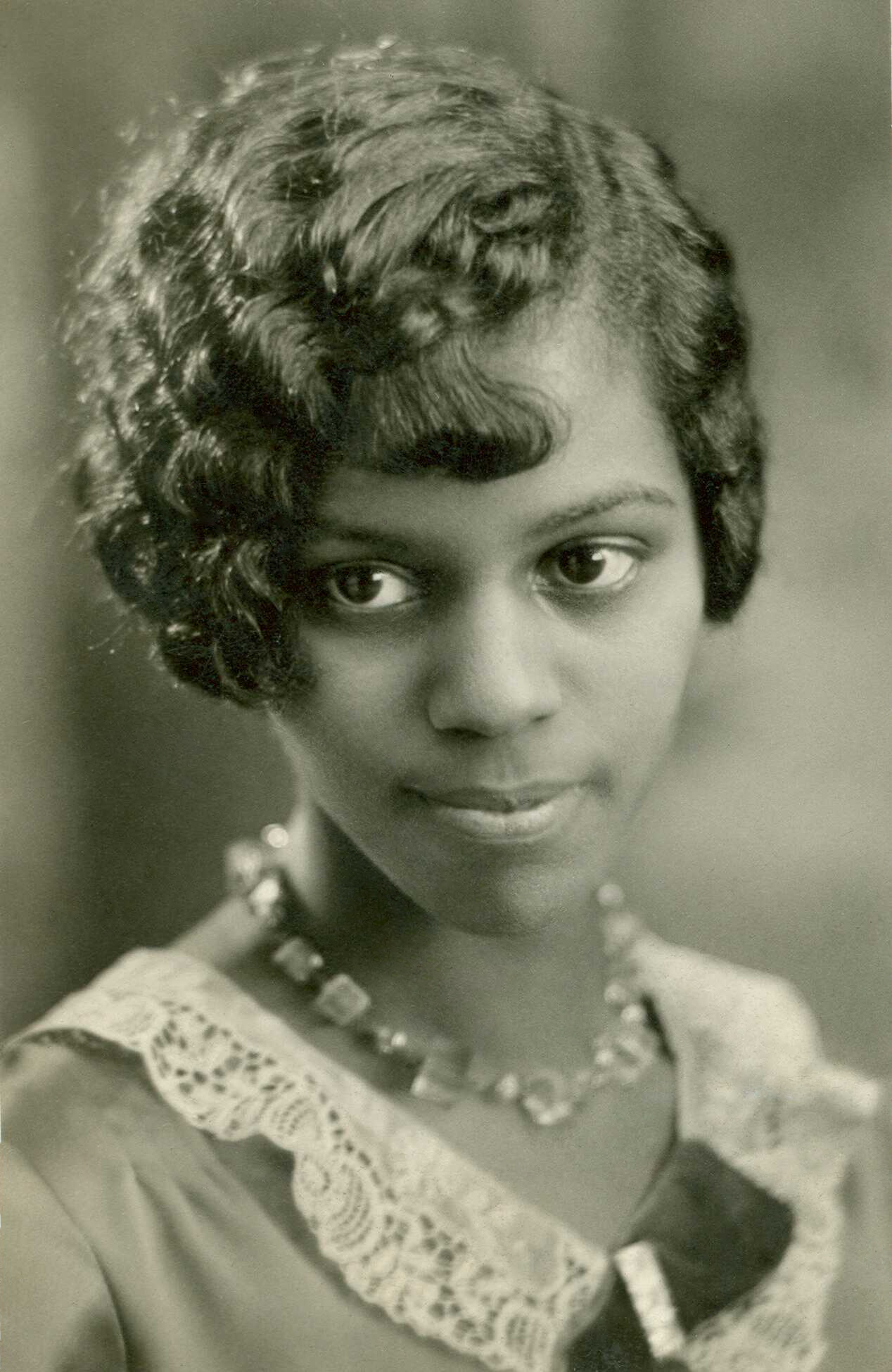
- At the time of her graduation in 1930
- Born: August 9, 1909; Jackson, Mississippi, United States
- Died: August 29, 2003 (aged 94); Greensboro, North Carolina, United States
- Occupations: Educator, college president, civil rights activist
- Parent(s): Clarence C. Player; Beatrice Day Player
- Relatives: Edith Player Brown (sister); Linda Beatrice Brown (niece)

Willa Beatrice Player (August 9, 1909 – August 29, 2003) was an American educator, college administrator, college president, civil rights activist, and federal appointee. Player was the first African-American woman to become president of a four-year, fully accredited liberal arts college when she took the position at Bennett College in Greensboro, North Carolina.

In her career at Bennett College, Player had served as a teacher and then in progressively responsible administrator positions. From 1955 to 1966, Player served as president of the historically black college, during a period of heightened civil rights activism in the South. She supported Bennett students who took part in the lengthy sit-ins started by the Greensboro Four to achieve integration of lunch counters in downtown stores.

Player had a strong education, earning a BA degree from Ohio Wesleyan College, a Master's from Oberlin College, a Certificat d'Études at University of Grenoble in France, and a PhD from Columbia University. After leaving the Bennett presidency, Player was appointed in 1966 by President Lyndon B. Johnson as the first female Director of the Division of College Support in the United States Department of Health, Education and Welfare, serving until 1986.

== Early life and education ==
Willa Player, the youngest of three children, was born to Clarence Cromwell Player and Beatrice (Day) Player in Jackson, Mississippi, in 1909. Her family moved to Akron, Ohio, in 1917, when Player was eight years old, as part of the Great Migration in the first half of the 20th century of African Americans to northern and midwestern industrial cities for work and educational opportunities. While living in Akron, Player studied violin. Growing up in a religious family, Player was active with them in the Methodist church. As a teenager, she spent hours as a member of the youth choir, which aided her pathway to college.

While attending West High School in Akron, Player was active in the school's orchestra, chemistry club, and as a student tutor. After graduating in 1925, Player attended the University of Akron briefly before transferring to Ohio Wesleyan University, a Methodist university where her sister, Edith, was also studying.

She was one of three African-American students admitted to the college that year. They were not allowed to live in the dorms on-campus, and lived in Delaware, Ohio, instead. Player majored in Latin, with minors in French and religion. Intending to be a teacher, she briefly served as a cadet teacher in Akron while in college. She graduated in 1929, along with her sister, musician Edith Player Brown. In 1930, Player earned a master's degree from Oberlin College.

== Academic career ==
In the fall of 1930 at the age of 21, Player was hired to teach Latin and French at Bennett College, a historically black, United Methodist-affiliated college located in Greensboro, North Carolina. Originally founded in 1873 as a coed normal school for training teachers, it had become a women's college in 1926.

After teaching at Bennett for a few years, Player took a leave of absence for postgraduate studies. She studied at the University of Grenoble in France, where she received a Certificat d'Études in 1935.

== College administration ==
Player returned to Bennett College after studying in France. She was selected as Director of Admissions and also served as the Acting Dean. In 1937, freshman student Frances Jones, daughter of the college president, David Dallas Jones, led a civil rights action in Greensboro. Player and R. Nathaniel Dett advised the younger Jones as she led a boycott and protest of segregated movie theaters and racist portrayals in film offerings in downtown Greensboro.

Player left Bennett College to pursue her Ph.D., which she received from Columbia University in 1948. Years later, she did post-doctoral studies at the University of Chicago and the University of Wisconsin. After Player returned to Bennett, she was promoted to Coordinator of Instruction and, in 1952, to Vice-President of Bennett College. Jet reported that she was the first person of color to be offered the presidency of Spelman College in Atlanta that year, but chose to stay with Bennett. Its president was still David Dallas Jones.

In 1955, Player was appointed as acting president when Jones was diagnosed with cancer. Knowing he would not be able to perform his duties, Jones recommended Player to the board of trustees for the president's position at Bennett. In the fall of 1956, Willa Player was inaugurated as the president of Bennett College, the first African-American woman to be selected as president of an accredited, four-year college. In 1957, Player gained accreditation for the college from the Southern Association of Colleges and Schools (SACS).

=== Civil rights movement ===
In the postwar period, civil rights organizations increased activism to achieve racial justice and exercise of constitutional rights, including integration of public facilities and the ability for blacks to register and vote in the South. Most blacks in North Carolina and other southern states had been disenfranchised since the turn of the century by laws of white-dominated state legislatures. The activism generated resistance and controversy among those who wanted no change in the Jim Crow social order.

Rev. Martin Luther King Jr., leader of the Montgomery bus boycott in 1955 and co-founder in 1957 of the Southern Christian Leadership Conference was invited to Greensboro in February 1958 by local African-American clergy and the NAACP. But because of controversy around him, local churches and colleges did not want to host him as a speaker. When Player was asked to host him, she said: "Bennett College is a liberal arts college where 'freedom rings,' so King can speak here." King spoke to an overflow crowd on February 11, 1958, at Annie Merner Pfeiffer Chapel at Bennett.

Willa Player encouraged Bennett College women to act their beliefs for civil rights and activism. Initially unaware that Bennett students were planning civil rights protests after King, Howard Thurman and Benjamin E. Mays had spoken at the college, Player encouraged them in their participation in sit-ins in February 1960 to achieve integration of lunch counters. She held meetings with faculty and staff during the Greensboro actions sit-ins to educate them, and arranged to support students in jail by delivering their assignments so they would not fall behind.

== Service ==
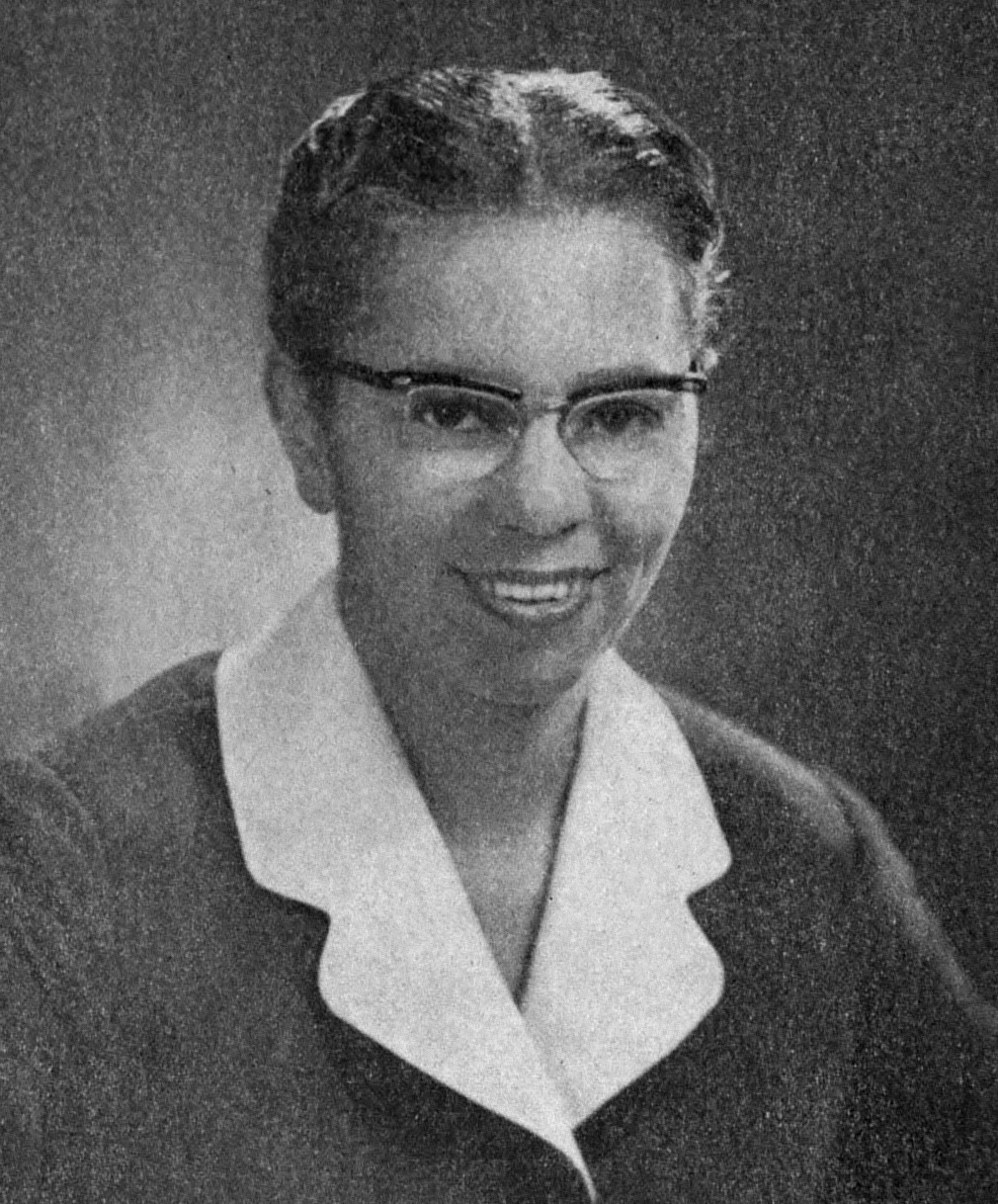
Player in 1962

In 1962, Player was named President of the National Association of Schools and Colleges of the Methodist Church, the first woman to hold the position. She was the first African American to serve on the board of trustees of Ohio Wesleyan. After 36 years of service to Bennett College, Willa Player stepped down as president in 1966.

She was appointed that year by President Lyndon B. Johnson's administration as the first female Director of the Division of College Support in the United States Department of Health, Education and Welfare, a position she held until retiring in 1986.

== Professional and civic membership ==
Player served as a Mott Foundation Trustee from 1981 to 1995 and trustee emeritus from 1995 to 2003. She was a member of Kappa Delta Pi, Pi Lambda Theta, the South Atlantic Regional Philosophy Education Society, North Carolina and National Teachers associations, National Council of Negro Women; Women's Planning Committee, St. Matthews Methodist Church; and Japan International Christian University Foundation, Incorporated.

== Personal life and death ==
Player never married, saying she "didn't have time for men" because she "was too busy educating the youth."

Player retired in 1986, and moved to Akron to live out her later years. She died on August 29, 2003, in Greensboro, and was buried in Glendale Cemetery in Akron, near her family.

== Legacy and honors ==
Player was inducted into the Ohio Hall of Fame (1984) and the Ohio United Methodist Hall of Fame (1985).

A Mott Endowed Chair was established in her honor at Bennett College.

She received several honorary doctorates during her career: Doctor of Laws, Ohio Wesleyan University (1953); Doctor of Laws, Lycoming College (1962); Doctor of Laws, Morehouse College (1963), Doctor of Laws, Albion College (1963); Doctor of Humane Letters, Keuka College (1967); Doctor of Humane Letter, University of North Carolina at Greensboro (1969); Doctor of Public Service, Prairie View A & M University (1971).

In 1962 she received the Silver Medallion from the Greensboro chapter of the National Conference of Christians and Jews (NCCJ), for her leadership in the areas of "religious and racial understanding and tolerance."

== Other reading ==
- Black Women in America An Historical Encyclopedia Volumes 1 and 2, edited by Darlene Clark Hine, 1993, Brooklyn, New York: Carlson Publishing Inc., ISBN 0-926019-61-9
- "Willa B. Player", CRDL, US Department of Education
- October 1955, Holgate Digital Library, Bennett College, 2011
- "Resolution honoring Willa B. Player", March 2005, North Carolina State Legislature
- "President Willa B. Player was the 75th Anniversary Speaker at Spelman College, The Crisis, May 1956, p. 309 (Collected edition)
- October 30, 195211. "Bennett Sit-In Story", Weebly, February 1, 2010
- Sanders, Crystal R. (2019). "Pursuing the "Unfinished Business of Democracy": Willa B. Player and Liberal Arts Education at Bennett College in the Civil Rights Era". The North Carolina Historical Review. 96 (1): 1–33. ISSN 0029-2494. JSTOR 45184986.
