= Linda Beatrice Brown =

American author and educator

Linda Beatrice Brown is an American author and educator. She was born in Akron, Ohio, and went to college in North Carolina at Bennett College. While in North Carolina, she won several awards for her writing in both fiction and nonfiction. Brown has published many books, including Belles of Liberty, Black Angels, Crossing Over Jordan and The Long Walk. The genres and styles of writing in which she wrote include fiction, nonfiction, playwriting and poetry. Many of her works are centered on the Civil Rights Movement and the struggles that can be rooted back to slavery during the time of the American Civil War.

== Biography ==
=== Early life ===
Brown was born in Ohio, the daughter of Raymond R. Brown and Edith Player Brown. She moved to North Carolina to pursue her education at the collegiate level. She attended Bennett College, while her aunt Willa Beatrice Player was the president, and majored in English and French. She graduated as the valedictorian of her graduating class at Bennett. After undergrad, she attended graduate school at Case Western Reserve University where she got her master's degree. Moving back to Ohio, she received her PhD in African American Literature and Creative Writing from Union Institute and University.

=== Career ===
Brown has been an educator at schools and universities including Kent State University, University of North Carolina-Greensboro, and finally Guilford College. Presently, she is the Willa B. Player Distinguished Professor of the Humanities at Bennett College for Women. She teaches African American literature there.

== Awards and nominations ==
Brown has received awards during her time in North Carolina. These include 2nd place in the Creative Writing Contest at her college, 1st place in fiction writing from the NC Coalition of the Arts and a residency at the Headlands Center.

== Published works ==
=== Books ===
- A Love Song to Black Men. Broadside Press. 1975.
- Rainbow 'Roun Mah Shoulder. Ballantine Press. 1989.
- Crossing Over Jordan, a novel. Ballantine Press. 1995.
- The Long Walk: The Story of the Presidency of Willa B. Player at Bennett College. Bennett College Women's Leadership Institute. 1999.

=== Articles ===
- "Beloved, A Book Review," in Religion and Intellectual Life, vol.3, Spring, 1988.
- "Treasure," a short story in O. Henry Festival Stories, Transverse Press. 1995.
- "Poetry," in Word and Witness. Carolina Academic Press. 1999.

=== Drama ===
- Congo's River Song, a one-act play produced by the North Carolina Museum of Art, Oct 13, 2001.
- Dangerous Pretty Produced as a one-act play, North Carolina Museum of Art, 1999.
- "Dangerous Pretty", fiction in The Store of Joys, ed. Houston Paschal. The North Carolina Museum of Art. 1997.
