= Hattie Carwell =

American physicist

- Born: July 17, 1948 (age 77); Brooklyn, New York
- Education: Bennett College for Women Rutgers University
- Scientific career
- Fields: Health physics
- Institutions: U.S. Department of Energy International Atomic Energy Agency

Hattie Carwell (born July 17, 1948) is an American physicist and former scientist with the United States Department of Energy and the International Atomic Energy Agency. In 1990, she became a program manager for high energy and nuclear programs with the DOE San Francisco Operations Office. She additionally was a lead operation engineer at the Berkeley Site Office from 1994 to 2006. She has also contributed to several non-profit organizations with the goal of promoting diversity within STEM-related fields.

== Biography and education ==
Carwell was born on July 17, 1948, in Brooklyn, NY. She grew up in Ashland, Virginia where she was encouraged by her community to become a scientist. Carwell graduated as valedictorian of her high school class. After graduating high school, Hattie enrolled in the Bennett College for Women in Greensboro, North Carolina in the Fall of 1966. She graduated from the college in 1970 with a bachelor's degree in chemistry. In the fall of 1970, Carwell was enrolled in Rutgers University where she earned an M.S. degree in health physics.

== Career ==
After graduating from Rutgers University in 1971, Hattie Carwell obtained a position with the U.S. Department of Energy as a health physicist, providing radiation safety oversight in several national laboratories. Carwell went on to work in Vienna, Austria from 1980 to 1985 where she served as a nuclear safeguards inspector and group leader at the International Atomic Energy Agency. In 1985, she moved to Oakland, California and worked with the Department of Energy, contributing to the development of new radiation safety policies, as well as how to streamline them while conducting research. She then became the program manager for high energy and nuclear programs in 1990 at the Department of Energy's San Francisco Operations office. Later, Carwell became a senior facility operations engineer at the Berkeley Site Office in 1992. In 1994, she was promoted to operations lead, a position which she held until 2006. She later became a senior physical scientist before retiring in 2008.

In 2010, Carwell attended a workshop organized by the National Academies of Science, Engineering, and Medicine titled "Chemistry in Primetime and Online: Communicating Chemistry in Informal Environments." In March 2020, she served on a panel about higher education leadership at the 50th Annual Conference of the Council of Historically Black Graduate Schools. She was an attendee at the 2014 National Academics of Science, Engineering, and Medicine workshop entitled Opportunities for the Gulf Research Program: Middle-Skilled Workforce Needs.

== Writing ==
Carwell has written two books and numerous articles and has also been listed as a contributor in several publications. One of her books is titled Blacks in Science: Astrophysicist to Zoologist.

== Boards ==
Carwell is one of the original founders to the Development Fund for Black Students in Science and Technology (DFBSST), founded in 1984, which has provided over $650,000 in scholarships to 225 students pursuing STEM education. Carwell still serves the non-profit organization on the board of directors as the chairperson.

From 2015 to 2019, Carwell served as the treasurer for the Northern California Council of Black Professional Engineers (NCCBPE), an organization that she was formerly the president of. She is also the executive director and co-founder of the Museum of African American Technology (MAAT) Science Village, a program of the NCCBPE which was founded in 2000 to promote science education, particularly among youth, and to collect archival material on the achievements of African American scientists and engineers. Carwell travelled to Antarctica in the winter of 2021 to provide a virtual experience that MAAT patrons could follow along with to learn more about climate change and the uniqueness of Antarctic political agreements.

Carwell also serves as the Coordinator of the Coalition of Hispanic, African and Native Americans for the Next Generation of Engineers and Scientists (CHANGES). This organization serves to promote the inclusion and participation of Hispanic, African American, and American Indian people in STEM and architecture.

== Recognition ==
Carwell has been recognized for her work with the Department of Energy, where she has received numerous awards. She has also received awards for her work in community leadership. She has received an award from her alma mater Bennett College where she is a distinguished alumnae. Carwell is also noted in Who's Who in America. In 1991, Carwell was inducted into the National Black College Alumni Hall of Fame. Carwell is featured in the book Sisters in Science: Conversations with Black Women Scientists on Race, Gender, and Their Passion for Science by Diann Jordan. On February 18, 2020, Carwell was featured on a podcast episode on a University of Manitoba radio channel. She was recognized at the STEM Future Foundation's WE ALL WIN WITH STEM! Fundraiser and Awards Ceremony in 2018 with an Urban Superhero Award and Congressional Accommodation from Barbara Lee. She is also listed as a fellow of the National Society of Black Physicists.
