= Bennett College =

Historically black women's college in Greensboro, North Carolina, US

- Former names: Bennett School, Bennett Seminary
- Motto: Education for your future Sisterhood for Life
- Type: Private historically black liberal arts college for women
- Established: August 1, 1873 and reorganized as an all-female institution in 1926
- Religious affiliation: United Methodist Church
- Academic affiliations: United Negro College Fund
- Endowment: $15 million
- President: Ronald L. Carter (acting)
- Faculty: 89
- Students: 207
- Location: Greensboro, North Carolina, United States; 36.0675°N 79.7785°W
- Campus: 60 acres (24 ha)
- Colors: Royal blue and white
- Website: bennett.edu
- Bennett College Historic District
- U.S. National Register of Historic Places
- U.S. Historic district
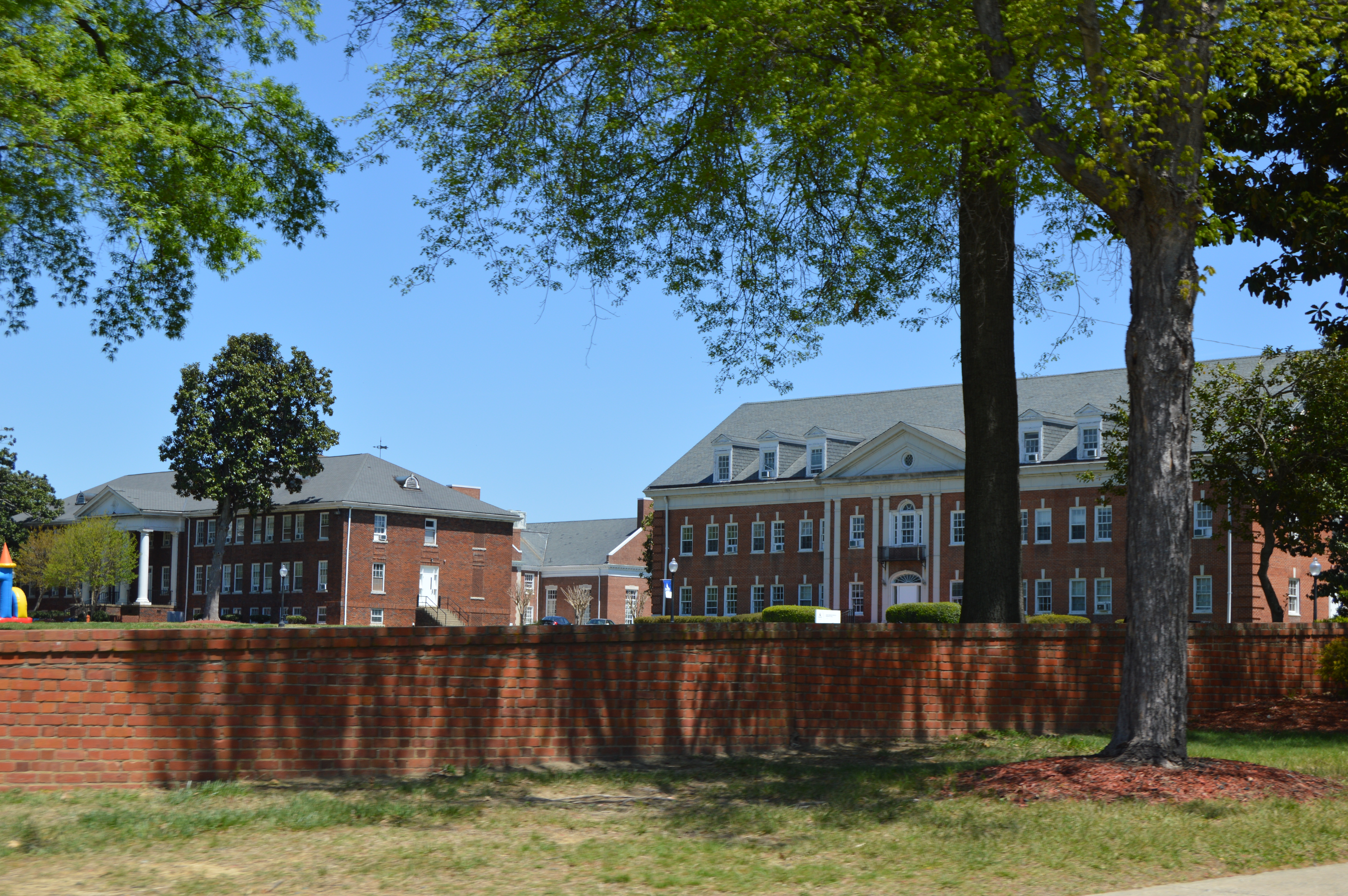
- Southern part of the campus

- Location within North Carolina Location within the United States
- Location: Roughly bounded by E. Washington, Bennett and Gorrell Sts., Greensboro, North Carolina
- Built: 1878
- Architectural style: Gothic, Georgian Revival
- MPS: Greensboro MPS
- NRHP reference No.: 92000179
- Added to NRHP: April 3, 1992

Bennett College is a private historically black liberal arts college for women in Greensboro, North Carolina. It was founded in 1873 as a normal school to educate freedmen and train both men and women as teachers. Originally coed, in 1926 it became a four-year women's college. It is one of two historically black colleges that enroll only women, the other being Spelman College.

In 1956, Willa Beatrice Player was installed at Bennett College, becoming the first African-American woman president of an accredited, four-year liberal arts college. She encouraged her students to be activists in the issues of the day. Beginning in 1960, Bennett students took part in the ultimately successful campaign in Greensboro to integrate white lunch counters at local variety stores. The college expanded its academic offerings and classes related to women's leadership.

In December 2018, the college's regional accrediting body, the Southern Association of Colleges and Schools Commission on Colleges, announced that it intended to revoke Bennett College's accreditation. The college had been on probation for two years due to its considerable financial challenges. The college launched an emergency funding campaign, Change and Progress for Bennett, to raise at least $5 million. By February 2019, the campaign raised $8.2 million. That same month, SACS withdrew accreditation from the college despite fundraising efforts; however, Bennett College filed a lawsuit against the accreditor and the court ordered the accreditation to remain in place pending the legal challenge.

== History ==
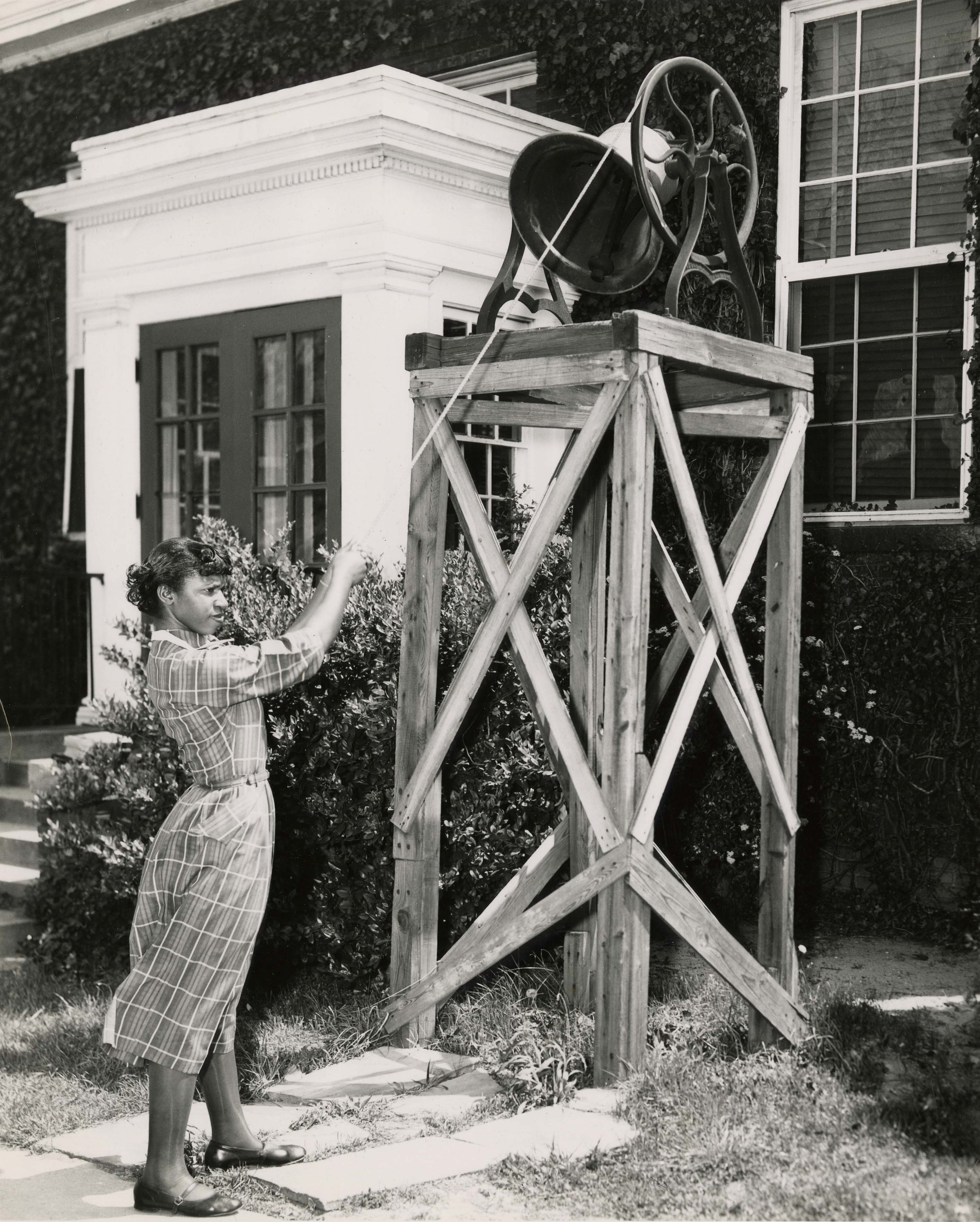
The bell was rung to notify students of class and meal times

Bennett College was founded on August 1, 1873, as a normal school for teacher training. It opened with seventy African-American men and women (freedmen, or former slaves). The school's founder, Albion W. Tourgee, was a Civil War veteran and jurist from Ohio who worked in North Carolina during Reconstruction and championed the cause of racial justice.

The school held its inaugural classes in the basement of Warnersville Methodist Episcopal Church North (now St. Matthew's United Methodist) in Greensboro. Bennett was coeducational and offered both high school and college-level courses, to help many blacks compensate for their previous lack of educational opportunity. The year after its founding, the school became sponsored by the Freedman's Aid Society and Southern Education Society of the northern Methodist Episcopal Church (like the Baptists, the Methodist churches had split in the years before the war over the issue of slavery, and established two regional conferences). Bennett remained affiliated for 50 years with the Freedman's Aid Society.

In 1878, freedmen purchased land for a future college campus (which was developed as the current site). Hearing about the college, New York businessman Lyman Bennett (1801–1879) provided $10,000 in funding to build a permanent campus. Bennett died soon after. The college was named Bennett Seminary. Hearing of Bennett's philanthropy, his coworkers commissioned a bell to be made in his honor and continued his mission by donating the bell to the school.

In 1888, Bennett Seminary elected its first African-American president, the Reverend Charles N. Grandison. Grandison spearheaded a successful drive to have the school chartered as a four-year college in 1889. Two of the first African-American bishops of the Methodist Episcopal Church were graduates of the college, including Robert Elijah Jones, an 1895 graduate. His brother was the future Bennett College president David Dallas Jones. Under the direction of Reverend Grandison and succeeding President Jordan Chavis, Bennett College grew from 11 undergraduate students to a total of 251 undergraduates by 1905. The enrollment leveled out in the 1910s at roughly 300.

In 1916, a survey conducted by the Phelps-Stokes Foundation recommended Bennett College be converted to a college exclusively for women. The Women's Home Missionary Society, which had supported women at the college since 1886, had found that there was no four-year college exclusively for African-American women, and they wanted to establish such a college. The North Carolina Board of Education offered Bennett College for that purpose.

After ten years, during which it studied other locations and conducted fundraising, the Women's Home Missionary Society and the NC Board of Education decided to develop the college in its current location. Bennett fully transitioned to a women's college in 1926. (Note: The Women's Home Missionary Society's on-campus involvement with Bennett women dates back to 1886.) Around this time, Bennett alumnae were nicknamed the "Bennett Belles" and the school gained a reputation as an institution of quality.

In 1926, David Dallas Jones was installed as president of the new women's college and served. Under his leadership, the college expanded, reaching an enrollment of 400. It became known in the black community as the Vassar College of the South, and Jones recruited faculty, staff, and students, from all cultural and ethnic backgrounds. The school was expanded to a 42-acre campus with 33 buildings, and its endowment increased to $1.5 million. Although he had major achievements, Jones's tenure was also marked with controversy.

In 1937, Bennett students protested downtown Greensboro movie theaters because of their segregation, which was state law at the time, and the depictions of black women in films they were showing. Frances Jones, daughter of the college president, led the protest; she was in her first year. This protest during the Great Depression and under Jim Crow conditions in the South, resulted in President Jones being investigated by the FBI and other government agencies. They were concerned about communist and leftist activities, as these groups were politically active in the United States. They ordered him to prohibit the students from protesting. Jones refused.

At his invitation, First Lady Eleanor Roosevelt came to the college on March 22, 1945, to meet with an integrated group of schoolchildren from Greensboro. Other visitors to the campus included Benjamin Elijah Mays, former Morehouse College president; poet Robert Frost, and writer James Weldon Johnson. Jones led the college for almost 30 years until he became ill in 1955, when he named Willa B. Player interim president. Player was the first female president of Bennett College, and the first black female president of any accredited four-year college in the United States. During Player's tenure, Bennett became the first black college to be fully accredited by the Southern Association of Colleges and Schools. Note: (Bennett's brother college is Morehouse College in Atlanta, Georgia. This relationship developed through the historic friendship of David Dallas Jones and Benjamin E. Mays.)

In October 1956, Willa Beatrice Player was inaugurated as President of Bennett College. She was the first African-American woman to be president of a four-year, fully accredited liberal arts college or university. During Player's tenure, Bennett in 1957 was one of the first historically black colleges to receive accreditation from the Southern Association of Colleges and Schools (SACS). On February 11, 1958, Player allowed civil rights leader Rev. Martin Luther King Jr. to speak at the school; he was prohibited by the city from speaking publicly anywhere else in Greensboro. His speech was entitled "A Realistic Look At Race Relations," and was delivered to a standing-room-only audience at Annie Merner Pfeiffer Chapel on campus. Player said about this visit, "Bennett College is a liberal arts college where 'freedom rings,' so King can speak here." King, Howard Thurman and Benjamin Elijah Mays inspired Bennett students to begin protests, and they became known as "Bennett Belles".

=== Civil Rights Movement ===
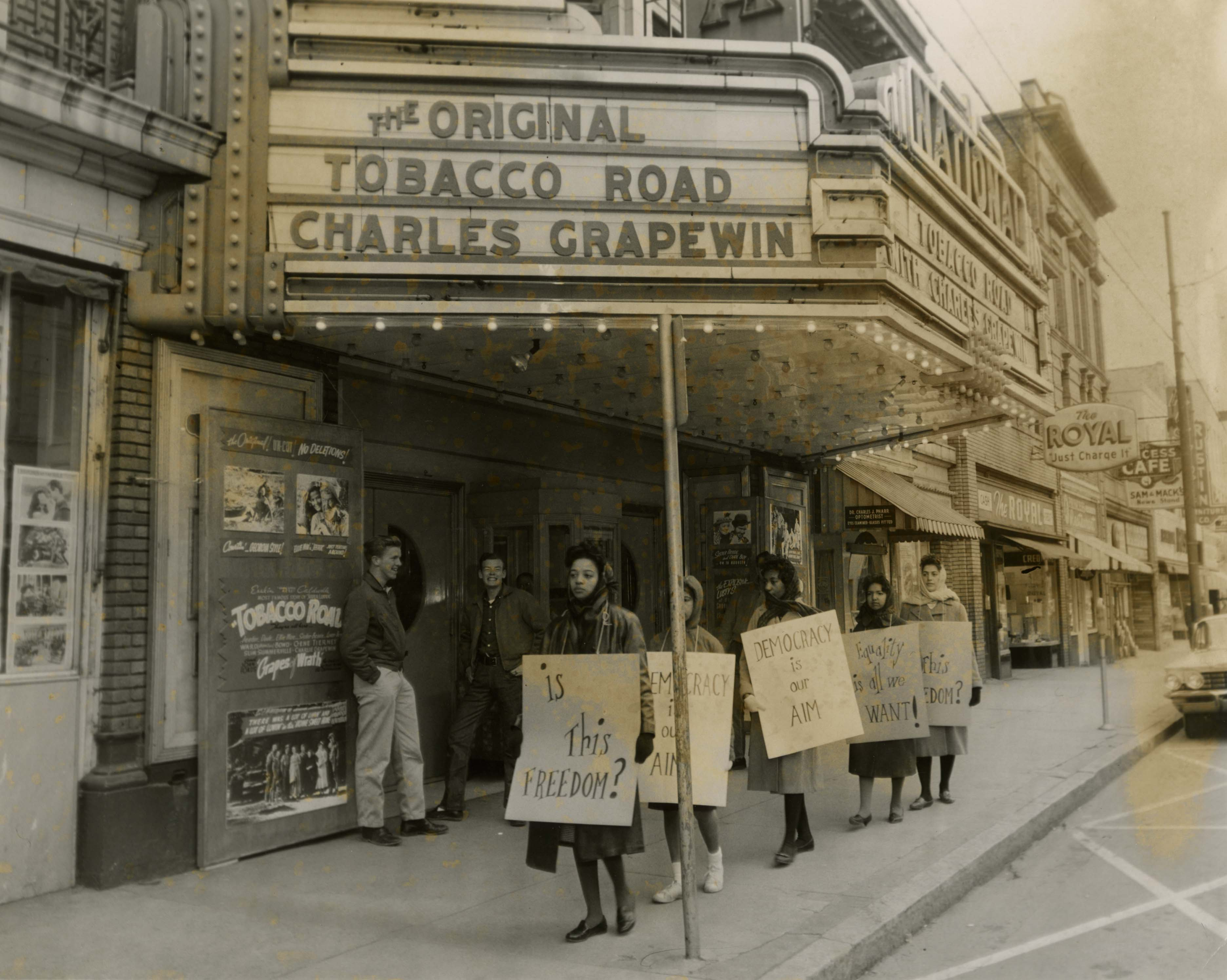
Bennett students picketing the segregated National Theatre

Civil rights activism at Bennett increased throughout the Civil rights movement. In February 1960 students from Bennett College and North Carolina A&T began a civil rights protest in downtown Greensboro that sparked the Greensboro sit-ins. Bettye Davis, class of 1963, committed to sitting at the white-only lunch counter of F. and W. Woolworth's variety store with students from A&T, and to keep returning until the store integrated the facility. On February 4, 1960, close to a dozen "Bennett Belles" were arrested due to their continuing protest at Woolworth's.

On April 21, 1960, Bennett and A&T students were arrested for trespassing at the white S.H. Kress & Co. lunch counter. On April 22, 1960, The Daily News of New York broke the story of the arrests nationally, with front-page headlines and a picture of well-dressed female students entering the back of a paddy wagon without any help from the police officers surrounding it. It reported that Greensboro police were surprised that the "Bennett Belles" had protested, as they were considered refined young women from an "elitist finishing school." At the peak of the sit-in movement, more than 40% of Bennett's student body was jailed. President Player personally visited the students in jail, carrying assignments to them so they would not fall behind in their studies.

Willa B. Player led Bennett until 1966. She was succeeded by Isaac H. Miller. His father had been an administrator at Bennett during President Frank Trigg's tenure. Miller maintained the "Bennett Ideal," despite the social changes of the late 1960s. Students protested the strict dress codes, disciplinary policies, and curfew. During the 1967–1968 school year, freshwomen walked out of dormitories one minute before curfew. Students took over the student union while demanding change to college policies. Miller surrounded the buildings with campus security, and brought in family and sleeping bags, changing the protest to a campus-wide "sleepover". Students were required to wear dresses or skirts, and hats and gloves until the early 1970s.

Miller collaborated with other colleges and universities in Greensboro to form a consortium that expanded Bennett's academic program by giving students access to other local universities. His administration developed the biomedical research and interdisciplinary studies programs, along with a bridge program in conjunction with Meharry Medical College of Nashville, Tennessee. He collaborated with other HBCU presidents to establish the National Association for Equal Opportunity in Higher Education, serving on the first board of directors. Miller's plans were supported by alumnae, who donated material and fiscal resources.

Miller increased Bennett's endowment and also completed the construction of four new buildings on campus. He served as president for 21 years, the second-longest presidential tenure in Bennett College history, and during a period of considerable social change. He retired in 1987. Gloria Randle Scott became Bennett's 12th president and its second woman in that position.

Gloria Randle Scott started as President of Bennett College on July 1, 1987. She established the Women's Leadership Institute and the Center for African Women and Women of the African Diaspora. Bennett admitted new African immigrants as well as students who were African nationals. In 1989, poet and activist Maya Angelou was installed as a member of the board of trustees. Scott was President of Bennett for 14 years before retiring in 2001.

=== 21st Century ===
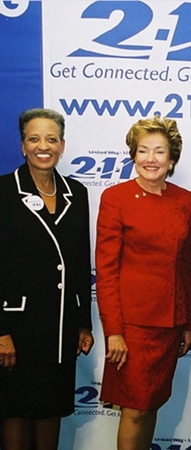
Senator Elizabeth Dole visiting Bennett College in 2003

Bennett underwent numerous changes under Sister President Emerita Johnnetta B. Cole, who was inaugurated in July 2002. In her first year at Bennett, Cole erased the school's $3.8 million deficit and raised an estimated $15 million in funding. Before Cole's tenure, Bennett College had been under SACS probation for two years, which was finally lifted in 2002. The school was revitalized and much-needed renovations were made to campus buildings; new buildings were built. In total, she led a $50 million campaign.

Numerous prominent figures spoke at the campus and some helped raise funds for its operations. Former President Bill Clinton, former US Senator Robert Dole, trustee emerita Maya Angelou, and Oprah Winfrey have all assisted in fundraising. The campaign closed successfully at the end of Cole's tenure on June 30, 2007.

On July 1, 2007, Julianne Malveaux became President of Bennett College. She led a $21 million expansion and renovation project for the college. She increased enrollment, added four new buildings, including a multimedia center, and renovated additional buildings. Malveaux enhanced the overall academic curriculum, which focuses on women's leadership, entrepreneurship, communications, and global studies.

On July 1, 2012, Esther Terry '61 became the first alumna to lead the college. Already serving as the college's provost, Terry was made interim president for a full academic year. In 2013, the Board of Trustees announced Terry would be the sixteenth president of Bennett College.

Former provost Phyllis Worthy Dawkins assumed the presidency on August 15, 2016. Dawkins focused on faculty/staff recruitment and reinvigorating living-learning communities; she launched a leadership institute. She was replaced in 2019 by Suzanne Elise Walsh, who was previously deputy director of the Bill & Melinda Gates Foundation's Postsecondary Success division. Walsh stepped down in June 2025.

Following a period of interim leadership, Bennett named Ronald L. Carter as its acting president in May 2026.

Since 1930, Bennett has graduated more than 7,000 students.

=== Accreditations and memberships ===
In 1930, on the graduation of its first four women with a four-year bachelor's degree, the "A" rating was granted to the college by the North Carolina State Department of Education. This same rating was granted to the college in 1936 by the Southern Association of Colleges and Schools (SACS), the college's regional accreditor. Today, the college is accredited by the Council on Social Work Education (CSWE) and the National Council for the Accreditation of Teacher Education (NCATE).

In 1957, Bennett was one of the first and the only private black college to be admitted into full membership in the Southern Association of Colleges and Schools. It has also been a member of the American Association of Colleges, The Commission on Black Colleges of the University Senate, the American Association of Registrars and Admission Officers, the American Council of Education, the American Association of Colleges of Teacher Education, the College Fund/UNCF, the Council on Independent Colleges, the Women's College Coalition, the North Carolina Association of Independent Colleges and Universities, the NCB Piedmont Automated Library System (NCBPALS), the Greater Greensboro Consortium, and the New York University Faculty Resource Network.

The college lost its accreditation from SACS on February 18, 2019. It was on probation for two years in the early 2000s because the college was struggling with significant financial challenges. In 2016, SACS placed the college on probation again for the same reason. In December 2018, SACS voted to withdraw the college's accreditation. The college launched a fundraising campaign and appealed the SACS decision.

In February 2019 it lost accreditation although it had succeeded in building its financial resources. A court ordered the accreditation to remain upright while the college filed a lawsuit against the accreditor.

=== Presidents ===
==== Bennett College ====
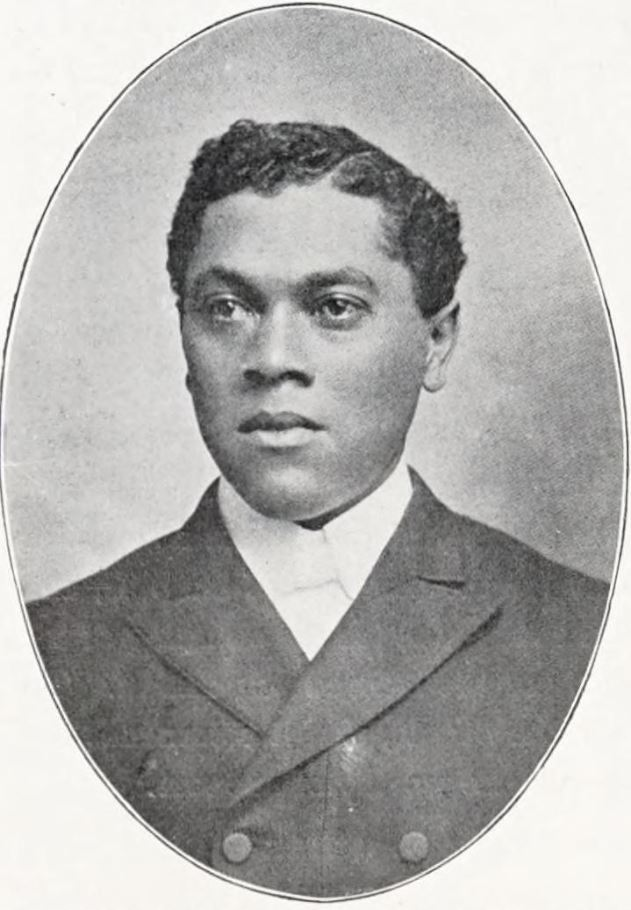
Silas A. Peeler

1874–1877: W.J. Parker (principal)
1877–1881: Edward Olin Thayer
1881–1889: Wilbur F. Steele
1889–1892: Charles N. Grandison
1892–1905: Jordan D. Chavis
1905–1913: Silas A. Peeler
1913–1915: James E. Wallace
1915–1926: Frank Trigg

==== Bennett College for Women ====
1926–1955: David Dallas Jones
1955–1966: Willa Beatrice Player – Bennett's first female president
1966–1987: Isaac H. Miller, Jr.
1987–2001: Gloria Randle Scott
2001–2002: Althia F. Collins
2002–2007: Johnnetta B. Cole
2007–2012: Julianne Malveaux
2012–2013: Esther Terry – Bennett's first alumna president
2013–2016: Rosalind Fuse-Hall
2016–2019: Phyllis Worthy Dawkins
2019–2025: Suzanne Elise Walsh
2025–2026: Teresa Hardee (interim)
2026–present: Ronald L. Carter (acting)

== Academics ==
Bennett College offers 24 majors and nineteen minors under three divisions: the Division of Natural and Behavioral Sciences and Mathematics, the Division of Social Sciences and Education, and the Division of Humanities. These disciplines include degrees in Bachelor of Arts, Bachelor of Science, Bachelor of Arts and Science in interdisciplinary studies, bachelor of Social Work, and the Bachelor of Fine Arts. Bennett also offers five dual degree programs including Chemistry/Chemical Engineering with NC A&T, Chemistry/Pharmacy with Howard University, Mathematics/Mechanical Engineering with NC A&T, Mathematics/Electrical Engineering with NC A&T, and Mathematics/Industrial Engineering with NC A&T.

== The Early/Middle College at Bennett College ==
The Middle College at Bennett is one of only two all-female high schools in the state of North Carolina. It began in 2003 as a "middle college", serving female 11th- and 12th-grade students who were at risk of dropping out of high school. By 2006, with the help of The New Schools Project Reform Initiative, The Middle College expanded to include 9th and 10th graders and began offering dual enrollment. With dual enrollment, students take college courses and earn transferable college credit as they earn their high school diploma. Students begin taking college courses in their 9th-grade year and may earn up to two years of transferable college credit hours by completion of their senior year.

== Campus ==
- Global Learning Center houses administrative offices of the President and Institutional Advancement. The GLC has four classrooms, study rooms and a multipurpose room.
- Susie W. Jones Alumnae House, the oldest structure on campus, was built in 1915. Later named for the wife of Bennett's President David D. Jones it is used to house alumnae activities and offices.
- Wilbur F. Steele Hall, erected in 1922, is named for the Reverend Wilbur Steele, president of Bennett from 1881 to 1889. Renovations were completed in 2004.
- Robert E. Jones Residence Hall, built in 1922, is named for the first black minister elected as a general superintendent with full Episcopal responsibilities in the Methodist Church.
- John H. Race Administration Building, erected in 1925, is named for a Methodist church Publishing House official and trustee of Bennett College. It houses Business and Finance, Human Resources, Global Studies, the Entrepreneurship Institute, and Public Relations.
- Enrollment Management Center houses the offices of Financial Aid and Admissions.
- Pfeiffer Residence Hall, constructed in 1924, was the nucleus of the current Bennett College campus and the first of five structures that bear some variation of the names of Mr. and Mrs. Henry Pfeiffer, the institution's most generous early benefactors.
- Black Hall was built in 1937 as Henry Pfeiffer Science Hall and was renamed for Ethel F. Black, a Bennett College trustee, when a new Henry Pfeiffer Science Hall was built in 1967–68. It is one of two principal classroom buildings. The building houses the administrative offices of Enrollment Management, the Registrar's Office, the Division of Social Sciences and Education including the Departments of Business and Economics, Curriculum and Instruction, Political Science and Social Work/Sociology, and one computer laboratory.
- Annie Merner Residence Hall bears the maiden name of Mrs. Henry Pfeiffer and was erected in 1937–38. It currently houses faculty offices and The Institute For Academic Success (IAS).
- Thomas F. Holgate Library was built in 1939 and was named for a former trustee of Bennett College. It was funded by the General Education Board of the Methodist Church. Renovations to this building were completed in 2004.
- Annie Merner Pfeiffer Chapel and Little Theater, erected in 1941, forms the north boundary of the quadrangle around which most of the major buildings cluster.
- Carnegie Building, formerly a branch library of the City of Greensboro, was acquired by Bennett College in 1967 and renovated for use as a center for outreach programs. This facility houses the Truth and Reconciliation Archives and a portion of Information Technology IT.
- Jessie M. Reynolds Residence Hall, built in 1948, was named for Mrs. Reynolds, a Bennett College trustee from 1936 to 1948 and president of the Woman's Division of Christian Service of the Methodist Church from 1940 to 1948.
- David D. Jones Student Union, erected 1949–50, was named for the president of the college from 1926 to 1955 and is said to have been the first building erected as a student union on a predominantly black college campus in North Carolina. It houses the dining hall, central storeroom, bookstore, snack bar, post office, SGA offices, Commuter Student Lounge, Bennett Boutique, and recreational areas as well as the offices of the Student Affairs, Career Services, Residence Life, and Student Activities.
- Martin Dixon Intergenerational Center, the Bennett College laboratory preschool, is used as a pre-observational and training site for elementary education majors before their official field experiences in a public school setting. The first five-star, licensed child-care facility in Guilford County, the preschool is also used by other departments in the college for students to gain exposure to and experiences in working with young children. The Martin Dixon Intergenerational Center also serves as a training/field exposure site for the Department of Curriculum and Instruction, the Department of Psychology, the Department of Political Science and Social Work/Sociology, and the Department of Visual and Performing Arts. It is named for donor and Bennett alumna Joyce Martin Dixon '56.
- The President's Home forms the south base of the college quadrangle and was constructed in 1955.
- Laura H. Cone Residence Hall was built in 1961–62. Mrs. Cone was a Bennett College trustee and chairperson of the Trustee Committee on Buildings and Grounds.
- The Ida Haslip Goode Health and Physical Education Building is named for a long-time trustee of Bennett College who was also president of the Women's Home Missionary Society of the Methodist Church. The gymnasium contains an Olympic-style swimming pool, a standard basketball court, a combined stage and ballet studio, a corrective exercise gymnasium, faculty offices, four classrooms, and a seminar-conference room. This facility provides classrooms for the Early/Middle College High School at Bennett, a partnership program with the Guilford County School System.
- Willa B. Player Residence Hall was named for the first woman president of Bennett College (1955–66) and was occupied for the first time in the fall of 1967.
- Henry Pfeiffer Science Building was built in 1968. In addition to classrooms and laboratories, this structure contains four computer laboratories, one electronic classroom, an animal laboratory with an adjacent greenhouse, and the faculty development resource room and faculty lounge.
- The Honors Residence Hall, completed in 2010, is the largest residence hall. This facility has a capacity for 144 honor students, guest suites, a seminar room to accommodate lectures and special programs, and a computer lab for the residents.
- Pfeiffer Science Computer Laboratories serves all students on campus in a wide variety of disciplines. The computer labs, located on the first floor of Pfeiffer Science Building, are used as electronic classrooms for specific classes as well as for general academic purposes.
- Rose Catchings Complex, built in 1981, houses the administrative office of the Provost and Senior Associate Provost of the college; Student Health Services, Counseling Center, Information Technology IT, and Administrative Services.
- Merner Pfeiffer Plant – Journalism and Media Studies Building was adapted for reuse as an academic building in 2009. This historic building originally constructed in 1935 as the heating plant for the campus, houses the Department of Journalism & Media Studies.
- The Bennett College Micro-Laboratory for Effective Teaching housed in the Department of Curriculum and Instruction in Black Hall, is a simulated laboratory.

== Student life ==
There are over sixty campus social, service, religious, and student government association organizations. Bennett College also has collegiate sports.

== Notable alumnae ==
Name	Class year	Notability	Reference(s)
Dorothy L. Brown	1941	First African-American woman surgeon from the Southeastern United States and first African-American woman to serve in the Tennessee General Assembly, Brown was also the first African American woman to be made a fellow of the American College of Surgeons	
Maidie Norman	1934	Actress and educator. Maidie Norman's most famous role came in the 1962 horror and suspense film Whatever Happened to Baby Jane? alongside veteran actresses Joan Crawford and Bette Davis. Norman is also widely known in Hollywood for fighting against stereotypical movie roles of African Americans.	
Carolyn R. Payton	1945	Tapped by President Jimmy Carter as the first woman, first African American, and first psychologist to head the Peace Corps. She is also a pioneer in women's psychology	
Jacquelyn Grant	1970	Author of the widely acclaimed White Women's Christ and Black Women's Jesus: Feminist Christology and Womanist Response. Jacquenlyn Grant is the first African American woman to earn a doctoral degree in systematic theology at Union Theological Seminary. She is also an author, theology professor and minister.	
Beverly Buchanan	1962	African-American artist whose works include painting, sculpture, video, and land art. Buchanan is noted for her exploration of Southern vernacular architecture through her art.	
Yvonne Johnson	1962	First African American Mayor of Greensboro, NC and Educator.	
Gladys A. Robinson	1971	Democratic member of the North Carolina Senate representing the 28th district.	
Belinda J. Foster	1979	First African American female District Attorney in the State of North Carolina.	
Talia Melanie McCray	1990	Professor and noted research scientist.	
Sara Lou Harris Carter	1943	First African American model to be featured in a national poster advertisement campaign in the 1940s for Lucky Strike cigarettes. She was also an Actress, Educator and Humanitarian.	
I. Patricia Henry	1969	First African American woman to manage a major American brewery, making her a master brewer for Miller Brewing Company now MillerCoors.	
Hattie Caldwell	1971	noted African American Physicist	
Frances Jones Bonner	1939	First African American woman to train and to become a faculty member at Massachusetts General Hospital. She also led a successful protest and boycott of downtown Greensboro, NC movie theaters in 1937.	
Linda Beatrice Brown	1961	Author, Civil Rights Activist, Willa Beatrice Player Distinguished Professor of the Humanities at Bennett College for Women.	
Miriam Higgins Thomas	1940	food chemist for the United States Army at Natick Laboratories	
Joyce Martin Dixon	1956	Businesswoman and Philanthropist	
Laura Mitchell	1991	Superintendent of Cincinnati Public Schools	
Nelle A. Coley	1931	Famed educator and civil rights activist in Beaufort, North Carolina. She taught at the James B. Dudley Senior High for over thirty years.	
Alice Holloway Young	1942	Pioneer in American education who developed the first and oldest voluntary racial integration program in the U.S.	
Regina Lynch-Hudson		publicist, historian, and first African-American descendent of Colonel John Hazzard Carson to join the Daughters of the American Revolution.	

== Notable faculty ==
Name	Department	Notability	Reference
Johnnetta Cole		Served as President from 2002-2007	
R. Nathaniel Dett		Visiting Director of Music. Advisor to Frances Jones Bonner during 1937 downtown Greensboro, NC boycott and protest.	
Helen Elise Smith Dett		wife of R. Nathaniel Dett, taught piano.	
Julianne Malveaux		African-American economist, author, liberal social and political commentator, and businesswoman. Began as a visiting professor of economics before serving as president 2007–2012.	
Alma Adams		Was elected to North Carolina House of Representatives in 1994. Served as professor of art and former director of Steele Hall Art gallery.	
Merze Tate		Department chair of Social Science and professor.	
Willa Beatrice Player		Served as President from 1955-1966	
Liz Williamson		first artist-in-residence at Jacob's Pillow; dancer with Alvin Ailey American Dance Theater	

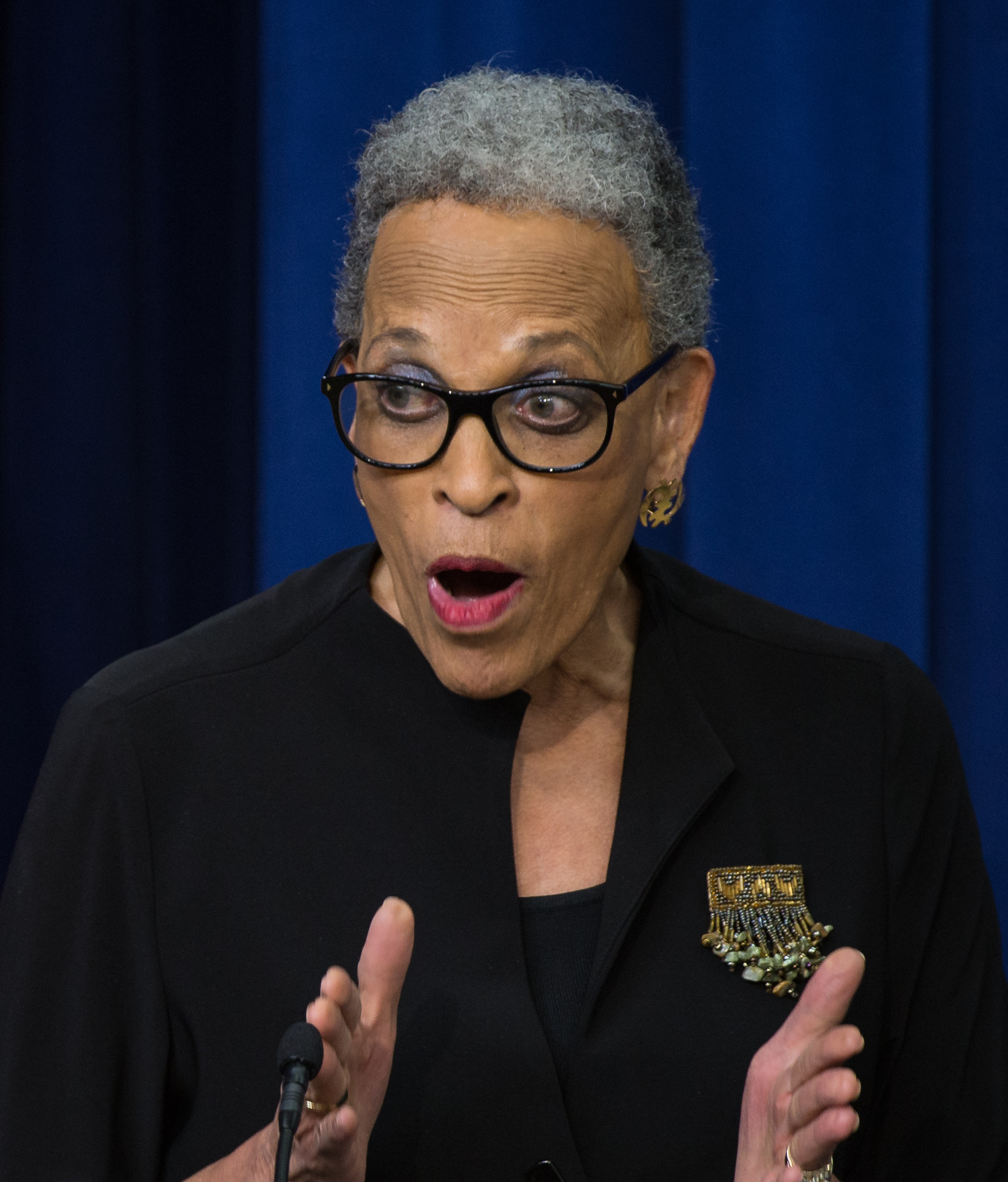
Dr. Johnnetta Cole, Director of the Smithsonian National Museum of African Art

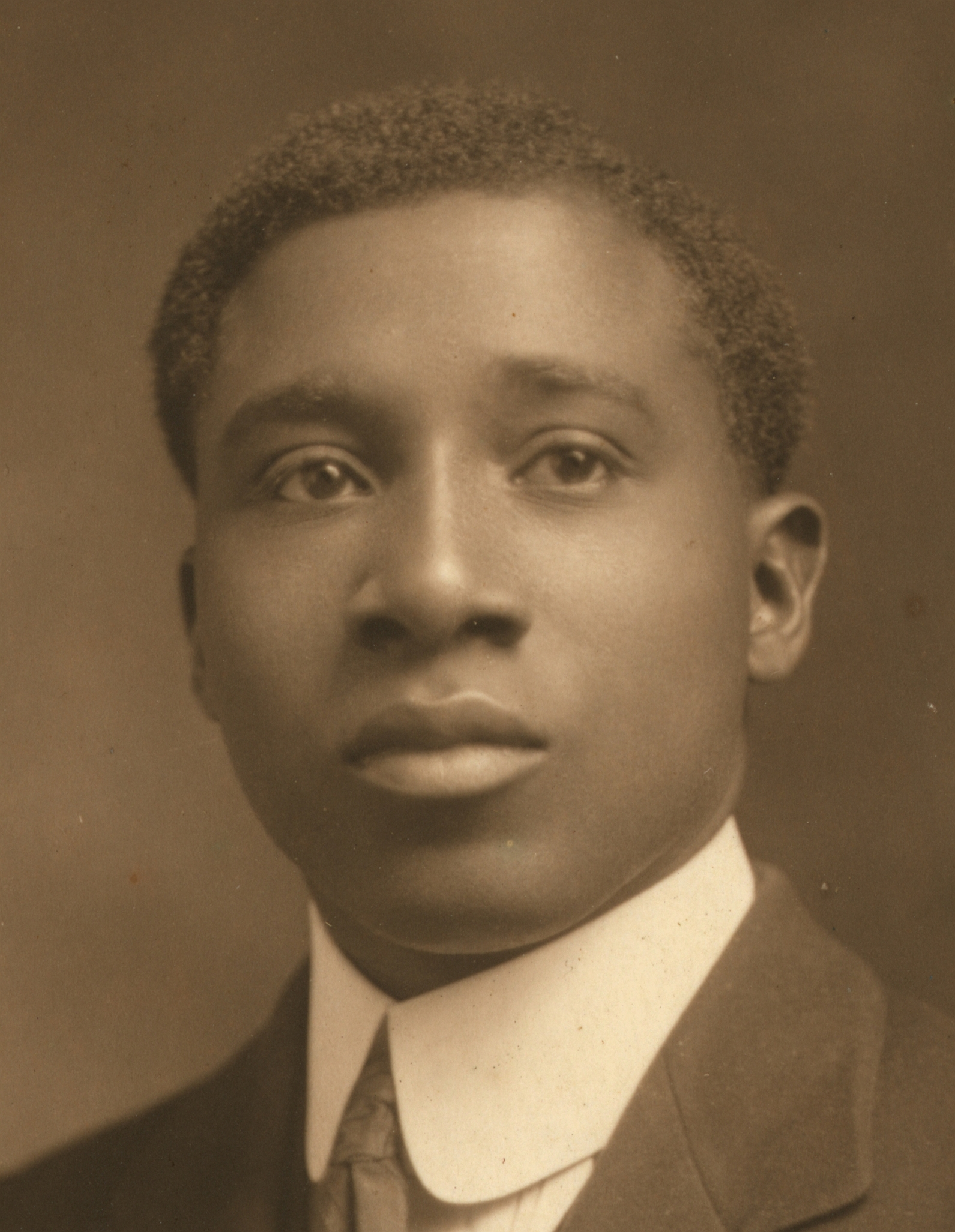
Robert Nathaniel Dett

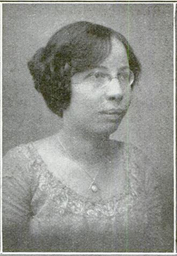
Helen Elise Smith Dett

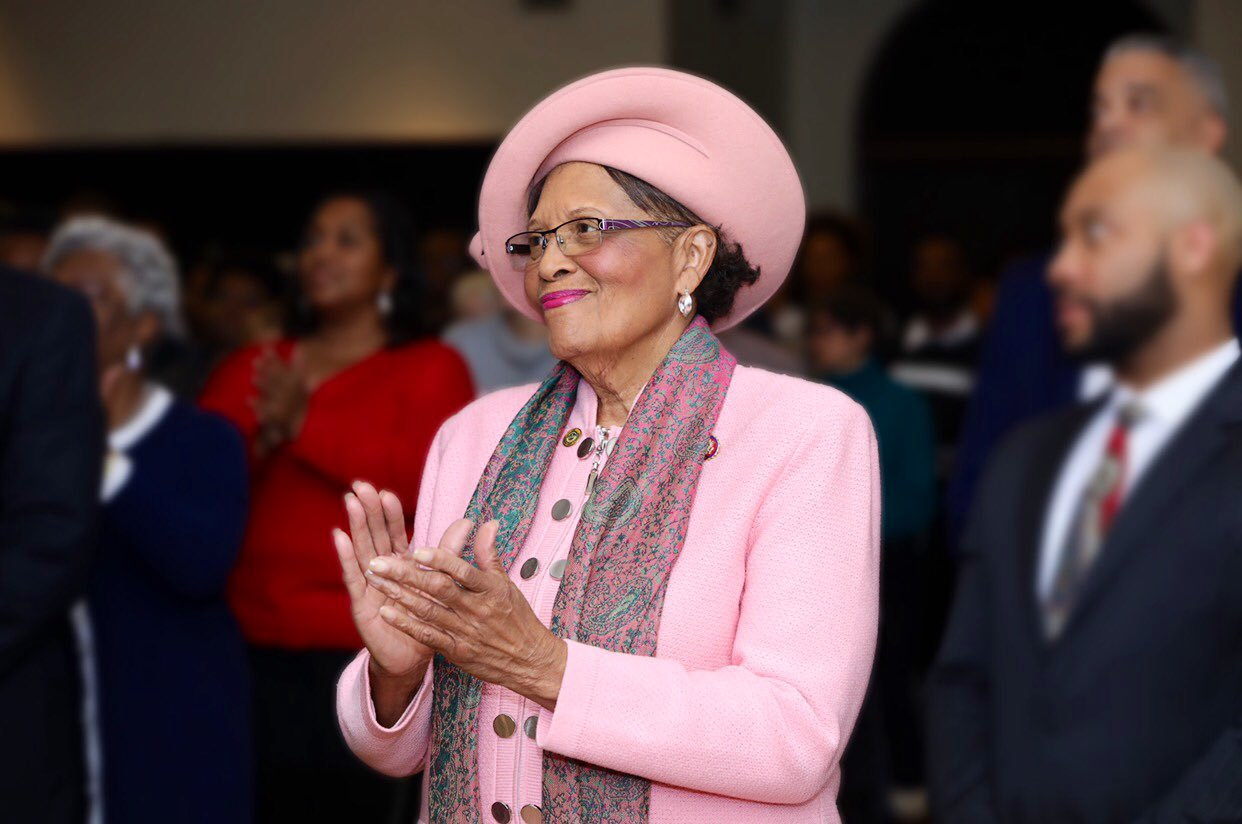
Alma Adams

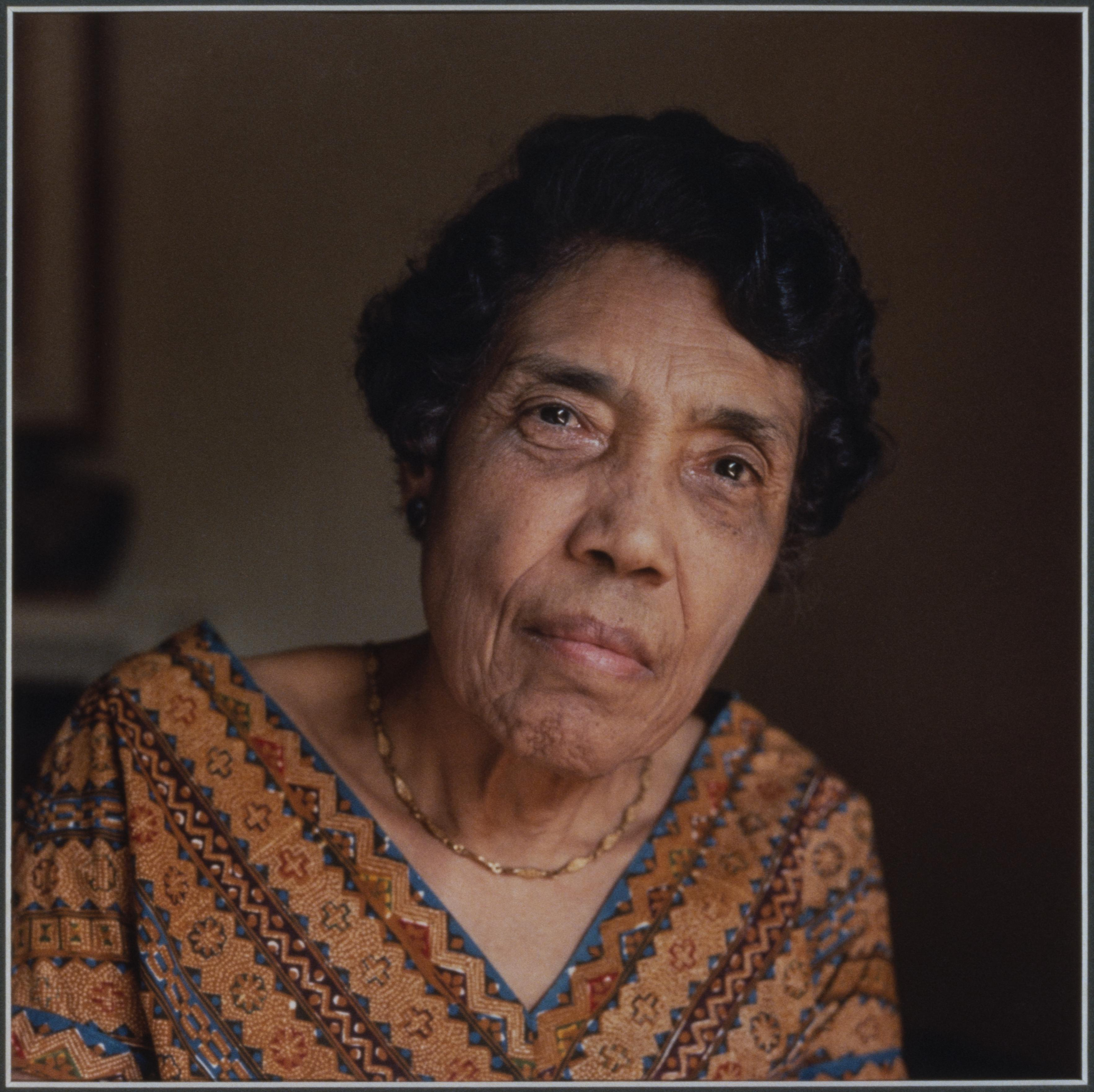
Merze Tate

== See also ==
- Women's Colleges in the Southern United States
