= Ambiance Matchmaking =

Ambiance Matchmaking is an exclusive matchmaking service that caters to highly accomplished single professionals. It offers a very selective and personalized matchmaking service, with a 27% acceptance rate in 2018. It was founded in 2002 and is headquartered in San Francisco, California. Leslie Wardman is the company's founder, chief executive officer, and matchmaker. The company works on local, national, and international levels, with offices in New York City, San Francisco, Los Angeles, Orange County, San Diego, Chicago, Tulsa, and Oklahoma City. The company works with CEOs, executives, founders, entrepreneurs, high-net-worth individuals, and celebrities. Ninety-five percent of its clients have college degrees and 70 percent have advanced degrees.

== History ==
Leslie Wardman, a former ESPN executive, founded Ambiance Matchmaking in 2002 in Tulsa, Oklahoma. Prior to opening Ambiance Matchmaking, Leslie worked for 20 years as an ESPN production and advertising executive followed by three years working as the director of an international matchmaking agency. Leslie has been a guest on several TV and radio shows, written columns on love and dating for major publications, and is the author of the book "Love, Dating & the Beatles." She is currently writing a book on the phenomenon of divorce after seventeen years, titled "Marriage and the 17-Year Itch."
