= Shanghai Marriage Market =

Matchmaking market in Shanghai, China

External videos
- "Shanghai's "Marriage Market" at People's Park"

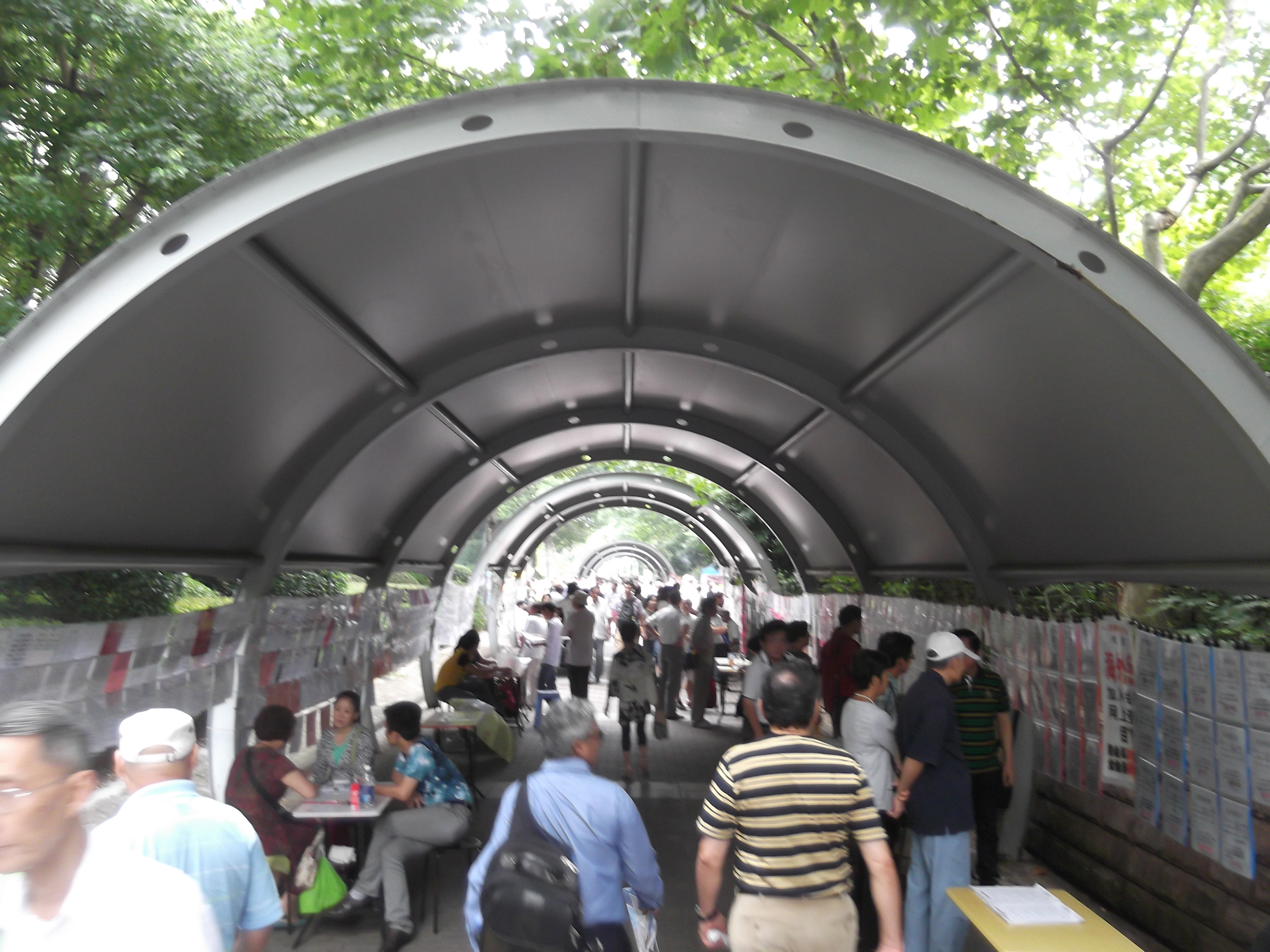
The market in 2013

The Shanghai Marriage Market (Chinese: 人民公园相亲角; pinyin: Rénmín Gōngyuán Xiāngqīn Jiǎo; lit. 'People's Park blind date corner') is a marriage market held at People's Park in Shanghai, China. Parents of unmarried adults gather in the park every Saturday and Sunday from noon to 5 p.m. to trade information on their children.

== Overview ==
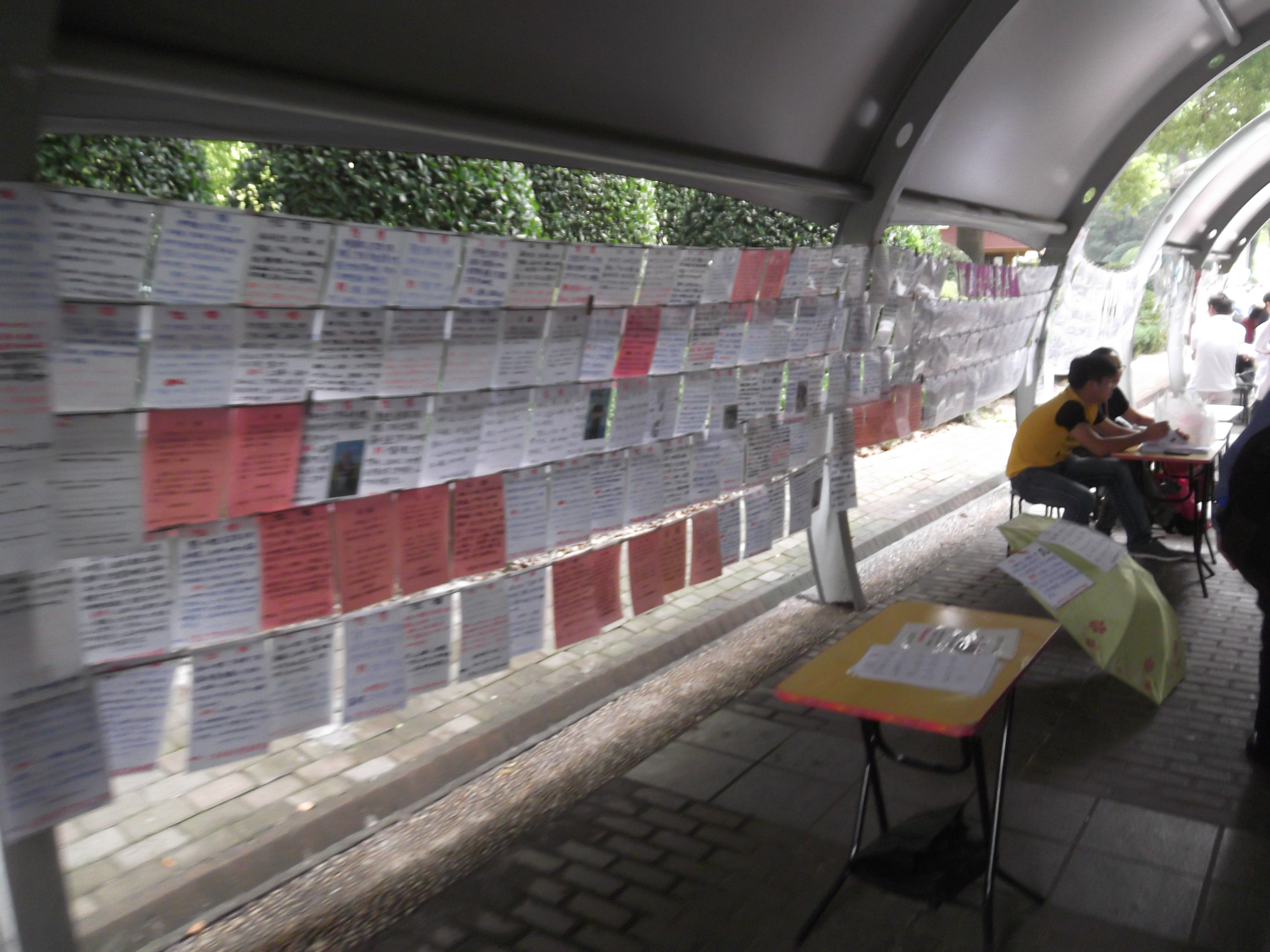
Advertising notices at the market

The primary goal of attending the Shanghai marriage market is for parents to find a suitable partner for their child. The standards of finding the right match may be based upon (but not limited to) age, height, job, income, education, family values, Chinese zodiac sign, and personality. Seniors born between the 1950s and 1960s tend to be the vendors at the marriage market. These seniors advertise their unmarried children born anywhere from the 1970s to 1990s in the market. All of this information is written on a piece of paper, which is then hung up on long strings among other parents' advertisements for their children. Advertisements are also attached to paper bags, clipped to trees, taped on umbrellas, or laid on the ground across People's Park. The parents walk around chatting with other parents to see if there is a harmonious fit only after their children's standards are met.

There are two main zones in the marriage market: the free zone and the amateur matchmaking zone. The free zone is where concerned parents look for potential partners for their sons or daughters. There are also some seniors looking for their own partners. Within the free zone, there are many sub-zones where parents can post their children's posters. Some sub-zones are divided by birth year, such as the 1970s, 1980s, and 1990s zones. Others include the overseas zone, "New Shanghainese" zone, divorcee zone, Muslim zone, and regional zones. In the amateur matchmaker zone, professional or voluntary matchmakers share lists of potential candidates to parents attending the market. There are professional matchmakers in the market who charge a consultation fee of RMB 100-200 for females and no fee for males. This discrepancy is said to be due to the surplus of females in the marriage market. According to local media reports, these professional matchmakers are often tricksters who disappear after receiving fees from parents.

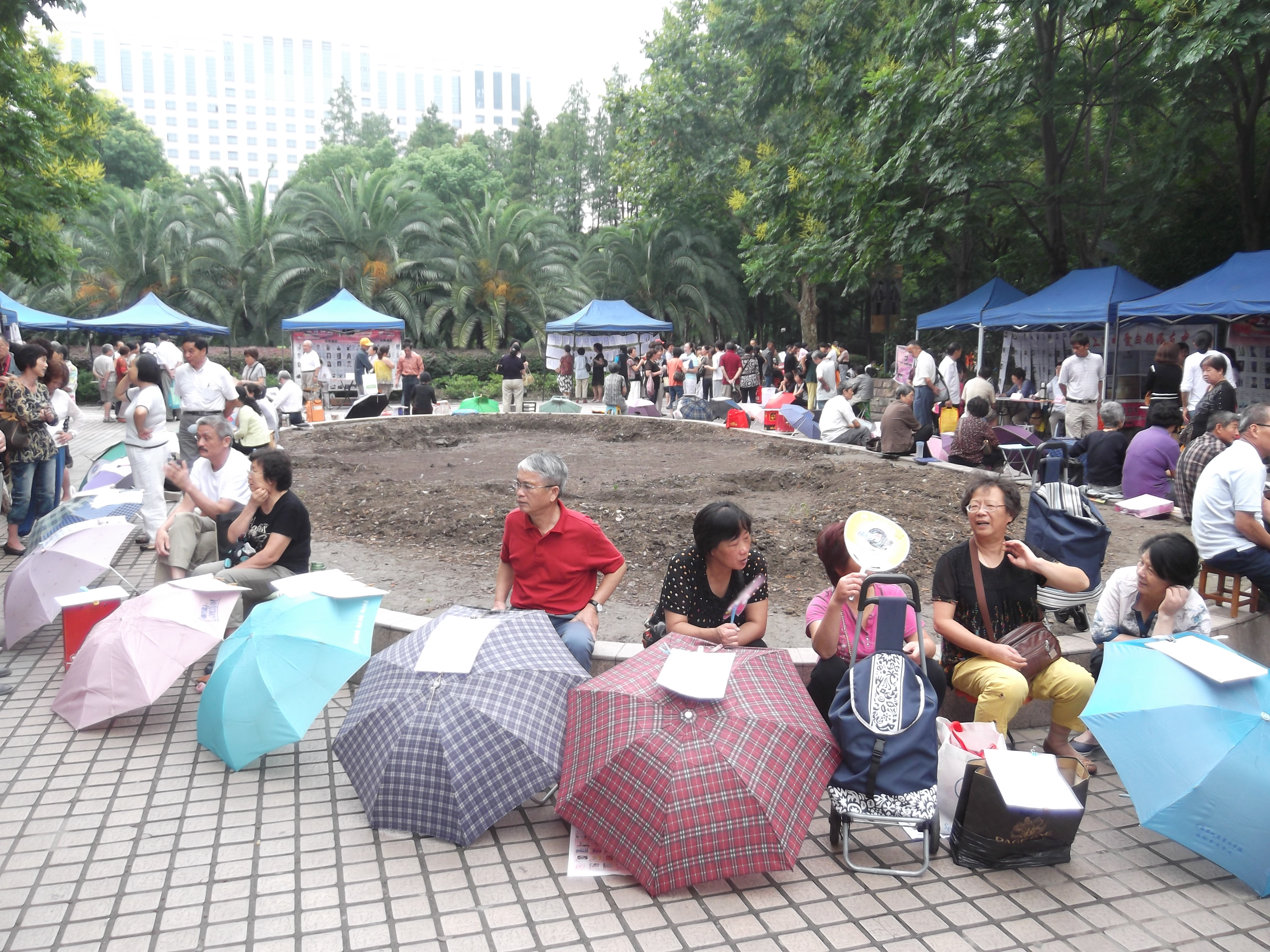
Umbrellas used for advertising

The marriage market at People's Square has existed since 2004. As of April 2013, it cost approximately US$3.20 for an advertisement that is displayed for five months, and marriage brokers provide full access to phone numbers for a $16.00 registration fee.

In many parents' eyes, parent matchmaking gatherings such as the Shanghai Marriage Market are the only way to uphold a traditional dating style for their children in modern China. China's long idealized tradition of continuing their family lineage is very important within Chinese culture. Some parents display advertisements despite not having permission from their child to do so. As the children of the One Child Policy start to become of typical marriage age, marriage opportunities have wavered in stability, particularly for males in China. The University of Kent predicts that by the year 2020, 24 million men in China will be unmarried and unable to find a wife.

=== Marriage markets in China ===
==== History ====
The first organized marriage market appeared in 2004 in Longtan Park, Beijing. Retirees who frequented the park for morning exercise found in conversation that many of them had unmarried children in their mid-to-late twenties. Anxious to marry off their children, the seniors began to hold matchmaking events where they presented information about their children and looked for potential matches. Since then, parks in major cities like Hangzhou, Shanghai, Shenzhen, Tianjin, and Wuhan have become unofficial matchmaking venues.

==== Patterns in marriage markets ====
These marriage markets do not have a formal organizer; typically, seniors living in the area gather voluntarily. Nonetheless, marriage markets tend to share similar characteristics. Firstly, sex ratios generally favor men, despite demographically having a surplus of men in China. In Beijing's Zhongshan Park, 80% of parents are looking for husbands for their single daughters. The majority of participants in the markets are young, college-educated women who work professional jobs and grew up in Shanghai. These urban daughters represent China's new middle class but are often categorized as "leftover women" in these marriage markets. Parents adopt a range of strategies to market their children, such as having good customer service and negotiation skills, designing posters carefully, and dressing well to signify good upbringing.

While there are no formal requirements for one to be advertised in the market, certain traits are deemed more desirable. For women, younger age, attractive physical appearance, good education, and docile temperament are sought after. For men, it is important to have a higher educational level, a good career, and a high income. Men are also expected to own an apartment and a car. Having Shanghai household registration record (hukou) is immensely important for all participants.

== Scholarship on the Shanghai Marriage Market ==
Ethnographic research has been conducted to study parent's motivations for attending the Shanghai Marriage Market. Paradoxically, Shanghai Marriage Market has a low success rate and most parents concede that it is unlikely to find a match, yet parents regularly return to the market to continue advertising their children. One study explained that the market responds to the collective anxieties of Chinese society, especially those born in the 1950s and 1960s. This generation of seniors are parents of the only-child generation who grew up as sent-down youth. In order to keep their urban household registrations, many of them remained single into their thirties, when they returned to their home cities. The state had to intervene in the dating scene to solve this problem of "overaged youth". Another source of parental anxiety is an overarching sense of volatility and insecurity since market-era economic reforms in China. Parents worry about their children's financial stability in a fast-paced, expensive urban center like Shanghai, especially without a robust social welfare system that provides housing and security. As such, these parents are worried that their only children will grow up leading difficult lives and having unhappy marriages. The marriage market is an outlet for parents to share their private worries in a public space, something that traditional Chinese culture deems inappropriate in other settings. Therefore, the market's primary function is to create social gatherings for seniors to share their collective worries in the changing environment of urban Shanghai.

The Shanghai Marriage Market is also a response to the rapid individualization in China since the market reform era. The opening of markets and the state's withdrawal from many social services created a need for greater socialization, particularly for seniors from that generation. Therefore, the market counters social anxieties arising from marketization and commodification.

Other motivations for going to marriage markets include an emphasis on homogamy, as many parents only consider candidates from similar socioeconomic backgrounds as themselves and scepticism about their child's ability to find a suitable partner.

== See also ==
- Arranged marriage
- Chinese marriage
- Dating in China
- Singles Day
- Marriage in Modern China
