= Spark Social =

Matchmaking mobile app

Spark
- Developer: DABSquared
- Release: March 1, 2015
- Operating system: Android, Apple iOS
- Type: Social networking
- Website: www.sparksocial.org

Spark Social or Spark was a matchmaking mobile app from DABSquared released in March 2015. Using geolocation technology and an Internet connection, the app displayed other people using it within a wide radius. The app was also able to use Bluetooth to find people in close proximity, up to 30 metres away, even when no Internet connection was available.

== Features ==
Users could use the app to connect for free with one other person once per day. The other person had 24 hours within which to respond. If the recipient was within close proximity then they would only be notified once they have moved away.

Spark required a Facebook account and included in-app purchases.
