= Dating agency =

Business which matches people for dating

A dating agency, also known as a marriage bureau, marriage agency, matrimonial bureau or matrimonial agency, is a business that provides matchmaking services to potential couples, with a view toward romance and/or marriage between them.

== Description ==
The modern marriage agency works in two principal ways to help clients find a marriage partner:

1. By having a group of members specifically seeking marriage partners.
2. Matchmaking.

Historically, marriage agencies usually worked alone. Modern marriage agencies now often work within federations or associations, enabling effects of scale that allow easier creation of marriage matches because of inter-marriage agency cooperation. This is common in Japan, where the culture, along with social influences have led to marriage agencies being responsible for 5.3% of marriages in 2010 and 2014.

Matchmaking is the core goal of marriage agencies, as their members largely focus on being with someone whom they truly love and are truly compatible with due to increased levels of happiness and fulfillment derived.

Marriage agencies as distinct from dating agencies also have total focus on their clients getting married, rather than just being life partners, dating, co-habiting, or forming other beneficial relationships.

== Variations ==
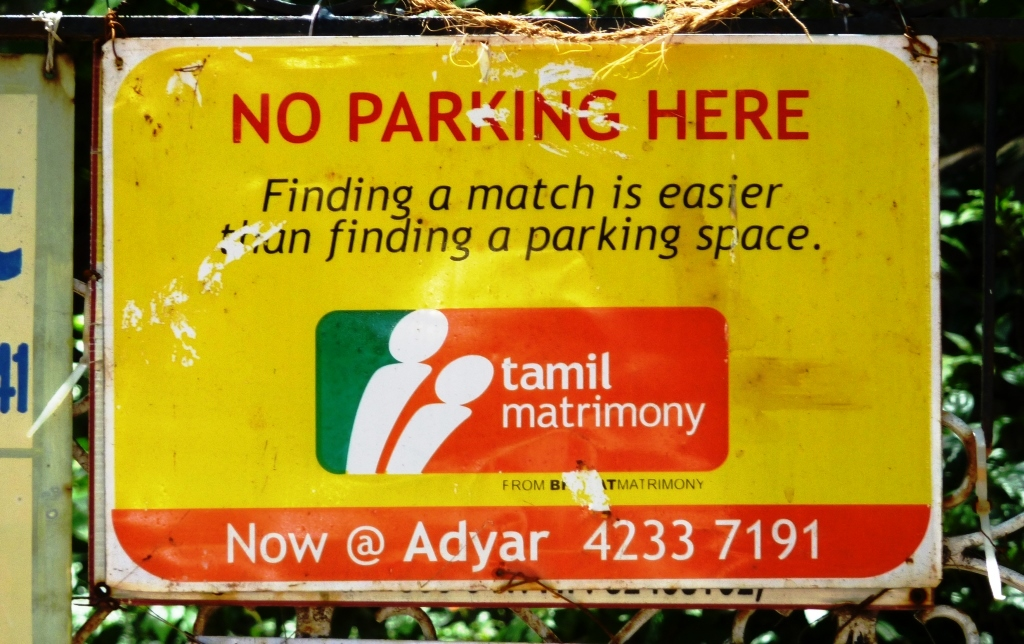
A dating agency sign in Chennai, India

- Face-to-face: Men and women come in person and ask a matchmaker to help them find a potential partner.
- Internet dating agency: A website where people register, post their profiles and contact other members who have signed up with the agency.
- Speed dating: A group of people rotate partners and describe their personality and desires within a set time limit.
- Marriage agency: An agency that specifically helps people find a marriage partner, rather than someone to date on a casual or serious basis. These can be domestic or international.

The internet and speed dating agencies are the biggest of the group.

There is a rise of businesses that teach men how they can meet women themselves without the use of a dating agency, some of which use the label pickup artist.

Both dating agencies and marriage agencies have some organizations where people are paid to interact with other members and keep their interests high. Various agencies only have members who are genuinely seeking real partners.

== History ==
Marriage agencies differ from dating agencies in that they are specifically for those seeking marriage.

=== Origins ===
Marriage agencies evolved from dating agencies. Historically they derive from matchmaking processes that extend back to the 1600s in England, when parish vicars played an important role in matching their parishioners with a spouse from the same social class. Similar practices were used in Japan from the 16th century where Nadoko (matchmakers) would perform omiai (marriage introduction) duties for parents seeking a worthy spouse for their child. In England religious ties were relinquished in 1825 with the advent of dating agencies in London, which became the new option to find someone suitable for those who experienced challenge in meeting a marriage partner.

=== 1700s and 1800s ===
Marriage agencies run by clergymen were introduced to England and Wales in the late 18th century, prompting considerable amusement from the social commentators of the day. In 1799 a "provincial publication says that a MATRIMONIAL PLAN is proposed to be established throughout every county, city, or town, in England or Wales. (...) The system of this curious, and it should seem serious, plan — as far as we can learn — is as follows: — Every person, of either sex, who desires to enter into a treaty of marriage, is first to subscribe a certain sum. All ladies and gentlemen to describe themselves, by real or fictitious names, as they may choose".

Men and women would classify themselves into three classes, and would generally state how much money they earned, or would be given as a dowry. A typical entry would read:

Second Class, No.2. — A gentleman, 40 years of age, a little corpulent, rather of a dark brown complexion, wears a wig, has a place in the Customs, and a small estate in Suffolk, with 750l. in the funds; reasonably well-tempered, and at times very lively; religion — of his fathers.

By 1825 an agency in Bishopsgate, London, opened three days a week for members of the public looking for a partner to describe themselves and subscribe to the appropriate list. However, by then both ladies and gentlemen had to classify themselves into 5 different classes.

=== 1900s and 2000s ===
Changes in culture and society have led to changes in the marriage rate, due to views of single people regarding marriage. In 1960 around 12% of adults between the ages of 25 and 34 had never been married. 10 years later when that same group was between the ages of 35 and 44, 7% of them were still unmarried. A further 10 years later in 1980, when those people were 45 to 54, 5% were still not married. The next group starting in 1970 followed a similar path. In 1960 the marriage rate was 72% for all adults over the age of 18, in 2010 the marriage rate was 51% for the same demographic.

Part of the marriage gap has been reported as being due to people waiting until they are older, have more educational degrees, and are more financially stable. With those who have waited marrying other professionally successful individuals, their desire being indicated as wishing to pass down both educational and financial capital to their children, and ensure stability for their children.

In addition to this there is the growing trend in various developed countries of those who just wish to remain single and have their freedom or to experience what has been termed delayed adolescence. Perceived reductions in partner loyalty, lower levels of self-esteem, stronger desire for financial stability, relationship issues, and the increased trend of divorce among married couples, are often cited as causing many to question whether the partners they meet would be suitable marriage partners. In addition dating app users cite issues of trust coming from deceit and dishonest relationship intentions which block them mentally and emotionally from developing serious relationships that could lead to marriage with persons met via dating apps.

=== COVID-19 lockdowns ===
Reduced contact, social distancing, lockdown and other pandemic mitigation measures, marriage agency introductions faced challenges due to COVID-19. At the same time, because of increased time at home leading to feelings of loneliness and people reassessing their lives, demand for marriage agency services and other partner introduction services increased significantly. In various places marriage agencies began making use of online video meeting facilities such as Zoom, in order for them to host virtual marriage introduction parties and online introductions.

== Fraud ==
Users of online agencies or sites may be susceptible to fraud or other forms of deception. According to the FBI, almost 15,000 complaints categorized as romance scams were reported in 2016.

== See also ==
- Marriage market
- Mail-order bride
