= Alvin and the Chipmunks (film) =

2007 live-action animated film by Tim Hill

- Theatrical release poster
- Directed by: Tim Hill
- Screenplay by: Jon Vitti; Will McRobb Chris Viscardi
- Story by: Jon Vitti
- Based on: Alvin and the Chipmunks by Ross Bagdasarian Sr.
- Produced by: Janice Karman; Ross Bagdasarian Jr.
- Starring: Jason Lee; David Cross; Cameron Richardson; Justin Long; Matthew Gray Gubler; Jesse McCartney
- Cinematography: Peter Lyons Collister
- Edited by: Peter E. Berger
- Music by: Christopher Lennertz
- Production companies: Fox 2000 Pictures; Regency Enterprises; Bagdasarian Company
- Distributed by: 20th Century Fox
- Release date: December 14, 2007
- Running time: 91 minutes
- Country: United States
- Language: English
- Budget: $55–60 million
- Box office: $365.4 million

Alvin and the Chipmunks is a 2007 American musical comedy film based on the characters created by Ross Bagdasarian Sr. It was directed by Tim Hill from a screenplay by Jon Vitti, Will McRobb, and Chris Viscardi. The film stars Jason Lee, David Cross, and Cameron Richardson, with Justin Long, Matthew Gray Gubler, and Jesse McCartney in voice roles. It follows the chipmunks (Alvin, Simon, and Theodore), who move in with struggling songwriter Dave Seville after losing their home.

Development began in 1997 when Ross Bagdasarian Jr. expressed interest in creating a live-action film. The project saw multiple changes before it was announced in September 2004 as a live-action animated hybrid collaboration between Fox 2000 Pictures, 20th Century Fox Animation, and Bagdasarian Company. The animation for the film was handled by Rhythm & Hues Studios, which studied real chipmunks and previous versions of the characters to design computer-generated models that retained their original essence. The integration of CGI with live-action footage required match-moving techniques and advanced visual effects software. The music was composed by Christopher Lennertz. The film is dedicated to the memory of Ross Bagdasarian, creator of the Chipmunks.

Alvin and the Chipmunks was released in the United States on December 14, 2007 by 20th Century Fox. Despite receiving negative reviews from critics, the film was a commercial success, grossing $365.4 million worldwide against its $55–60 million budget. Its commercial success led to it becoming the first in a film series, followed by three sequels: The Squeakquel in 2009, Chipwrecked in 2011, and The Road Chip in 2015.

== Plot ==
Talking chipmunk brothers Alvin, Simon, and Theodore reside in a fir tree, which is cut down and driven to Los Angeles after record label JETT Records purchases it as a Christmas tree. Meanwhile, struggling songwriter Dave Seville has his latest demo rejected by their chief executive and Dave's college roommate Ian Hawke, who suggests that Dave should quit writing songs. Dave heads home as the Chipmunks, finding themselves in the same building, leave the tree and follow him.

A struggle between Dave and the Chipmunks leaves the former knocked unconscious. He awakes and, terrified, initially forces the Chipmunks to leave his house. When he hears them sing "Only You (And You Alone)" and "Funkytown", Dave then makes a deal with the Chipmunks to sing his songs in exchange for food and shelter. The next day, the Chipmunks practice Dave's song, "Christmas Don't Be Late". However, when Dave tries to present the Chipmunks to Ian, the Chipmunks fail to sing because of stage fright. The day worsens as Dave is fired from his marketing job due to the Chipmunks having unknowingly ruined his presentation boards. While hosting dinner with former girlfriend Claire, Dave struggles to hide the Chipmunks after Alvin attempts to create a romantic atmosphere, causing an uncomfortable Claire to leave.

To make amends to Dave, the Chipmunks take a taxi to Ian's lavish mansion where they sing Dave's song, prompting Ian to sign a record deal and restore the songwriting career of Dave, now the Chipmunks' manager. The Chipmunks begin to view Dave as family, which Dave attempts to dismiss. After a successful performance of "Witch Doctor", Ian encourages Dave to explore more aggressive marketing of the Chipmunks. Concerned for their wellbeing, Dave insists the Chipmunks are too young to handle fame; Ian nonetheless convinces them Dave reduces their success.

After a falling out with Dave and finding and reading an old letter he wrote about their return to the forest, the Chipmunks decide to live with Ian. While pampering the Chipmunks with luxury and fame, Ian exploits their naivety by constantly overworking them throughout their tour. The Chipmunks and Dave begin to miss each other, but Ian wrongly assures them Dave is uninterested in the Chipmunks.

Ian's plan to take the Chipmunks (rumored to have voice exhaustion) on a twelve-month international tour is revealed on the news. Dave then decides to infiltrate their concert at the Orpheum Theatre to get them back; he admits his sentimentality for the Chipmunks to Claire, who helps him. Seeing Dave and realizing Ian lied about Dave being uninterested in their show and that Ian has tricked them all along, the Chipmunks cause chaos onstage. Dave is stopped by security as Ian locks the Chipmunks in a cage, preparing for their concert in Paris. Ian escapes in his limousine with Dave pursuing him. Dave rushes to Ian until the Chipmunks show up in his car before reconciling with Dave. Afterwards, Ian discovers their escape, which ultimately results in the collapse of his career and financial ruin.

== Cast ==
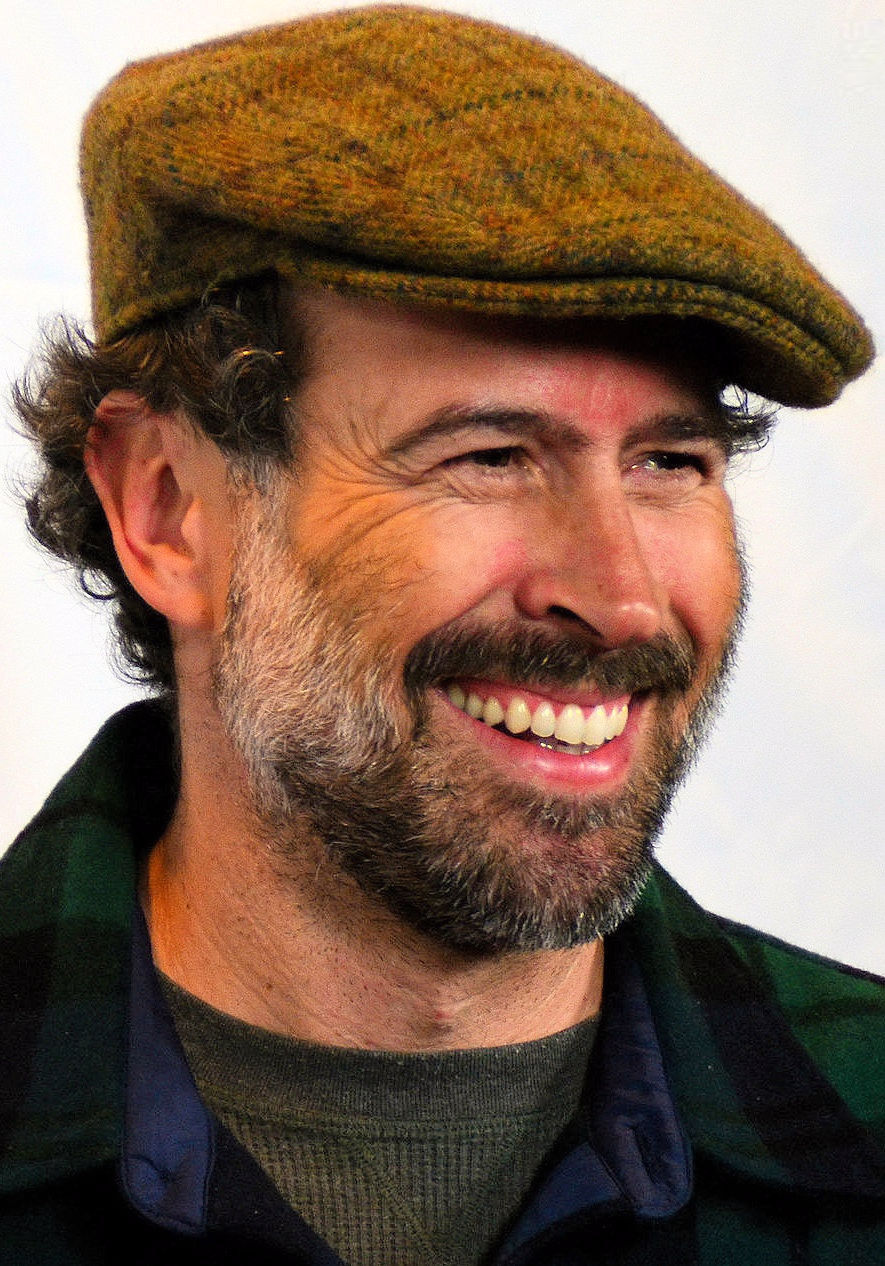
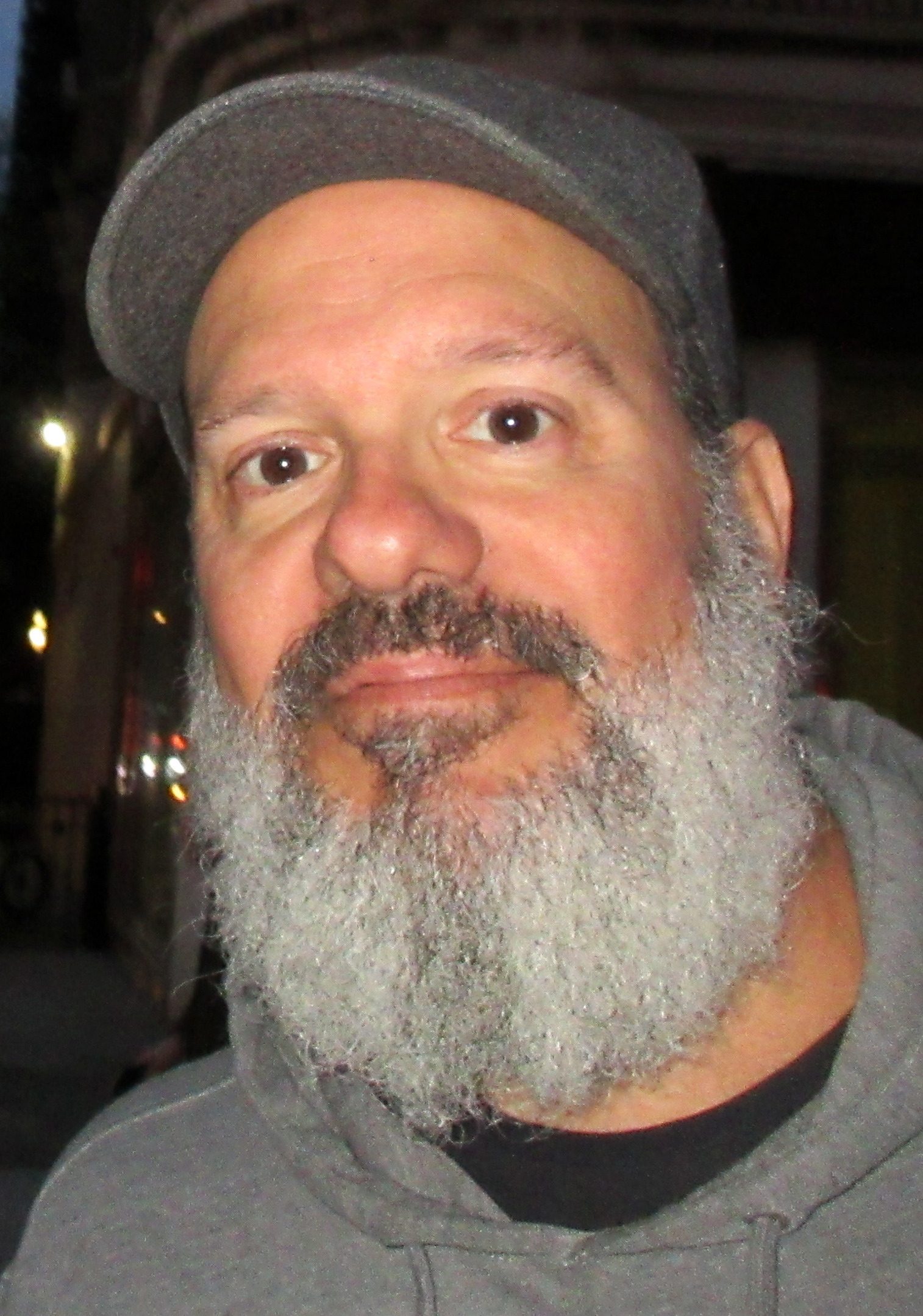
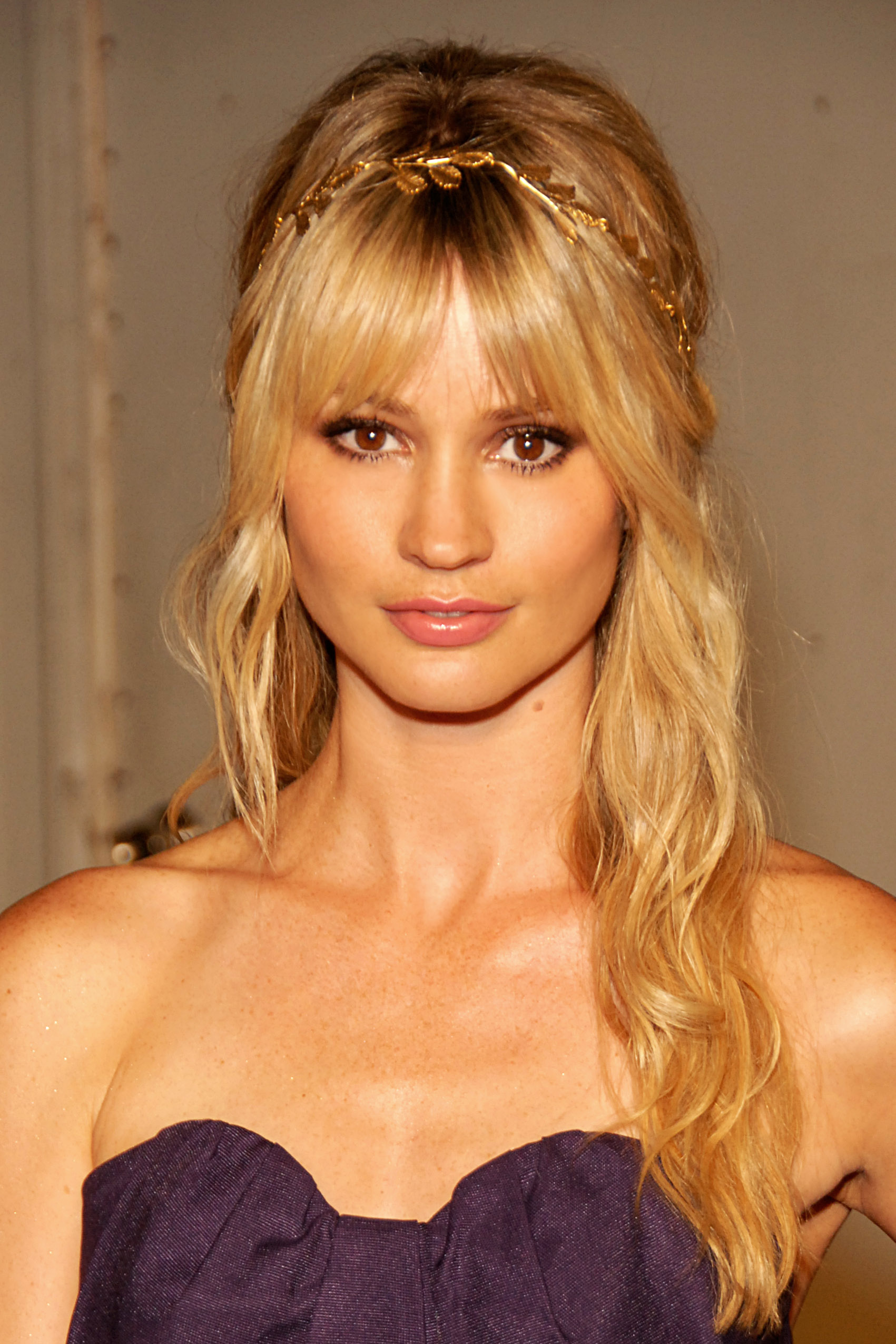
(L to R) Jason Lee (pictured in 2015), David Cross (2019), and Cameron Richardson (2009)

=== Live-action cast ===
- Jason Lee as David "Dave" Seville, a struggling and aspiring songwriter and a father figure to Alvin, Simon and Theodore
- David Cross as Ian Hawke, the CEO of JETT Records who is Dave's former college roommate and his rival who wants the Chipmunks for a career
- Cameron Richardson as Claire Wilson, Dave's ex-girlfriend
- Jane Lynch as Gail, an advertising executive and Dave's ex-boss
- Frank Maharajh as Barry
- Veronica Alicino as Amy
- Kevin Symons as Ted

=== Voice cast ===
- Justin Long as Alvin, the middle-sized brave, mischievous and musical chipmunk who is the leader of the brothers
  - Ross Bagdasarian Jr. as Alvin's singing voice
- Matthew Gray Gubler as Simon, the tall intelligent and musical chipmunk of the brothers
  - Steve Vining as Simon's singing voice
- Jesse McCartney as Theodore, the short timid and musical chipmunk of the brothers
  - Janice Karman as Theodore's singing voice

== Production ==
=== Origin and development ===
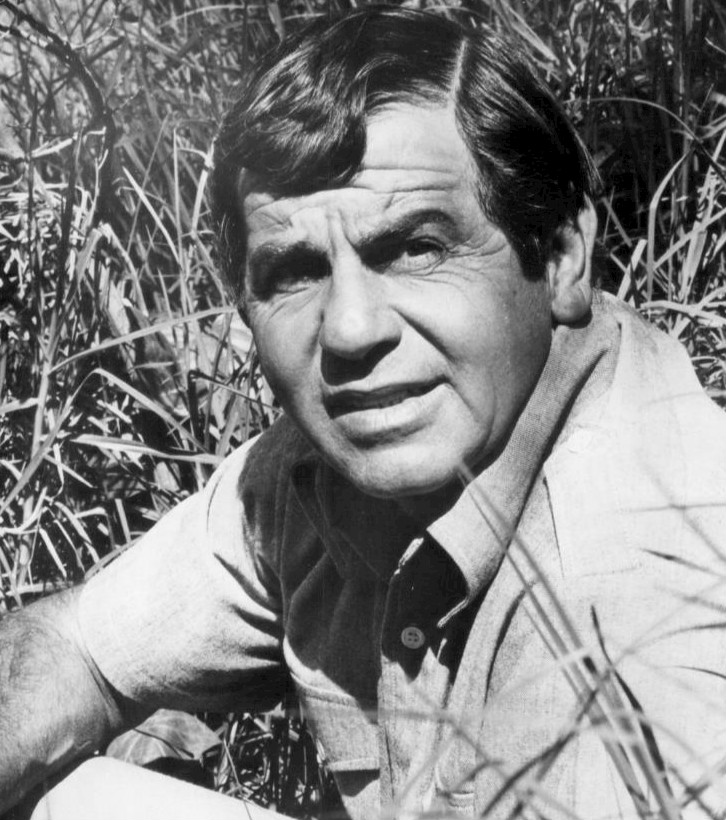
Ross Bagdasarian in 1972

In 1958, Ross Bagdasarian (using the pseudonym David Seville) experimented with speed-altered vocals to create "Witch Doctor", a novelty song about asking for love advice from a witch doctor. Its success, which included topping the Billboard charts, inspired Bagdasarian to apply the recording technique to create The Chipmunks: Alvin, Simon, and Theodore. Their debut song "The Chipmunk Song (Christmas Don't Be Late)" sold over 4 million copies and won multiple Grammy Awards. This popularity led to the first animated show, The Alvin Show, airing in 1961. After Bagdasarian's death, his son Ross Bagdasarian Jr. revived the Chipmunks with a successful Christmas special in 1981.

Ross Bagdasarian Jr. dreamed of making a live-action film since 1997 "and the dream has had many nightmare moments". In June 1997, Robert Zemeckis was assigned to direct a live action adaptation with Steven Spielberg producing with Universal Pictures, but the project was put on hold after the estate of Ross Bagdasarian Sr. filed a lawsuit against Universal in September 2000, claiming the studio had failed to properly license products featuring Alvin and his singing companions. In September 2004, Fox 2000 Pictures, 20th Century Fox Animation and Bagdasarian Productions announced they would collaborate to create a live-action computer-generated film starring Alvin and the Chipmunks. In April 2005, Jon Vitti, a former writer for The Simpsons, was revealed to be writing the screenplay. In January 2007, it was announced Tim Hill, former writer of Rocko's Modern Life and SpongeBob SquarePants, was in talks with Fox to direct the film, having previously directed Garfield: A Tail of Two Kitties.

=== Pre-production ===
Chevy Chase, Tim Allen, John Travolta, Ben Stiller, Adam Sandler, Paul Rudd, Vince Vaughn, John Stamos, Jim Carrey, Jason Bateman, James Marsden, and Bill Murray were originally considered for the role of David Seville. In March 2007, Jason Lee joined the project to play David Seville, and Cameron Richardson joined that month to play Claire. Patton Oswalt and Brian Posehn were approached to play Ian Hawke but all declined before David Cross landed the part. Justin Long, Matthew Gray Gubler and Jesse McCartney voiced the Chipmunks, replacing Bagdasarian Jr. and his wife Janice Karman, who had voiced the chipmunks since they revived the franchise. For recording, the chipmunk voice actors spoke their lines slowly to be sped up to normal speed in post-production; McCartney described it as a "tedious process", where "it could take 40 takes for one line." He owned the album Chipmunk Punk (1980) and studied 1980s Alvin cartoons for his role in the film.

=== Filming ===
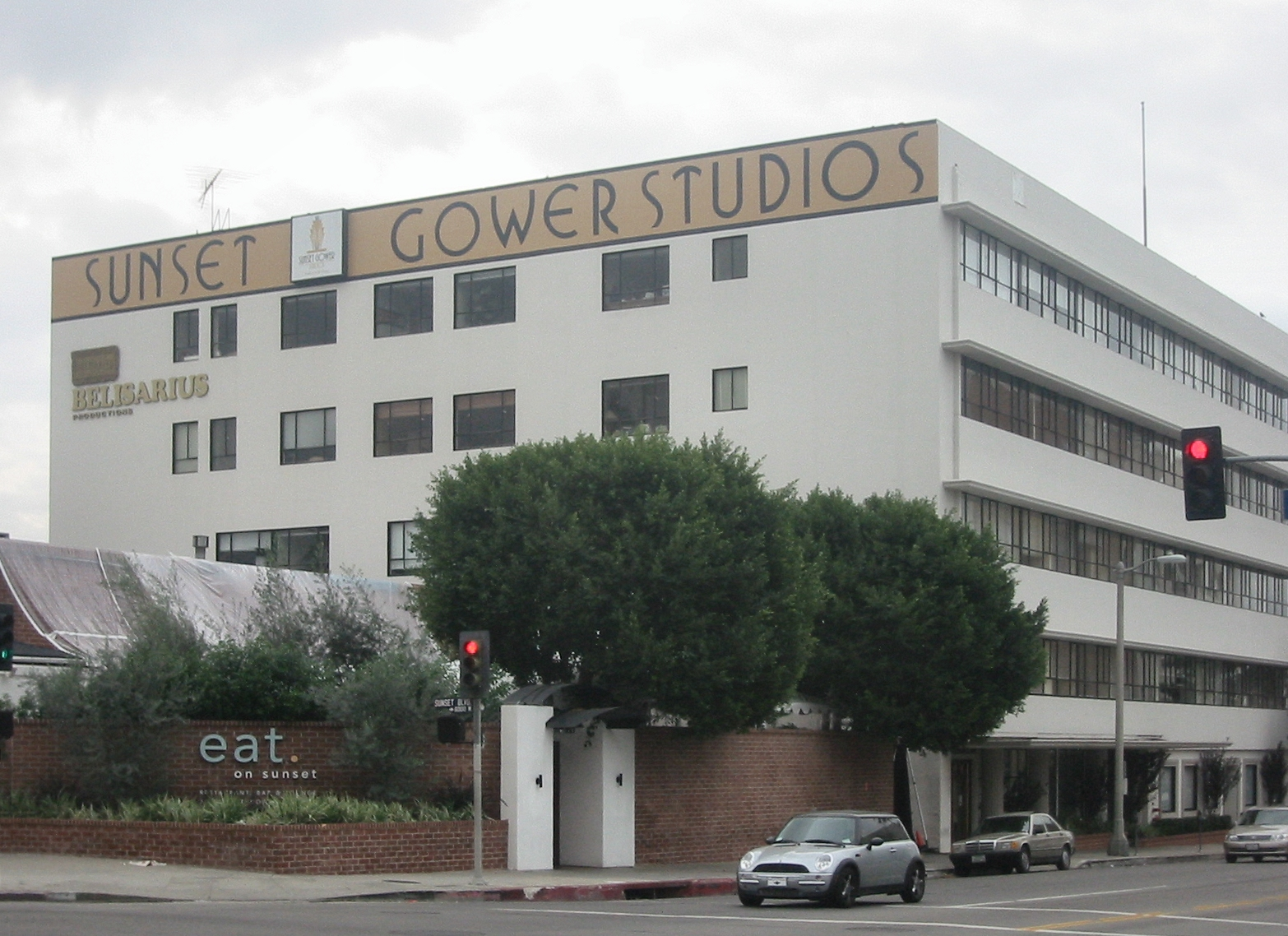
Dave Seville's house was built on Sunset Gower Studios (pictured).

Principal photography began on March 28, 2007, with filming taking place primarily in areas of Los Angeles. Seville's house was built on Sunset Gower Studios in Hollywood, and contains references to Bagdasarian Sr.'s life. The set pieces included an upright piano he used to write his songs and a flower visual he painted; the house's address number includes 1958, the year he created the chipmunk characters; and the house design is based on a cottage built in 1919, the year Bagdasarian Sr. was born.

In shots where human characters interacted with the chipmunks, the actors rehearsed with small stuffed animals indicating where the chipmunks would be; the animals were then removed when it was time to shoot, and the actors used their memory of where the animals were. In the mid-credits scene where Ian tries to get squirrels to sing, the actor and the animals were filmed separately. Using nuts, a trainer would bait squirrels in order to get them to turn their heads in different directions.

=== Visual effects and animation ===
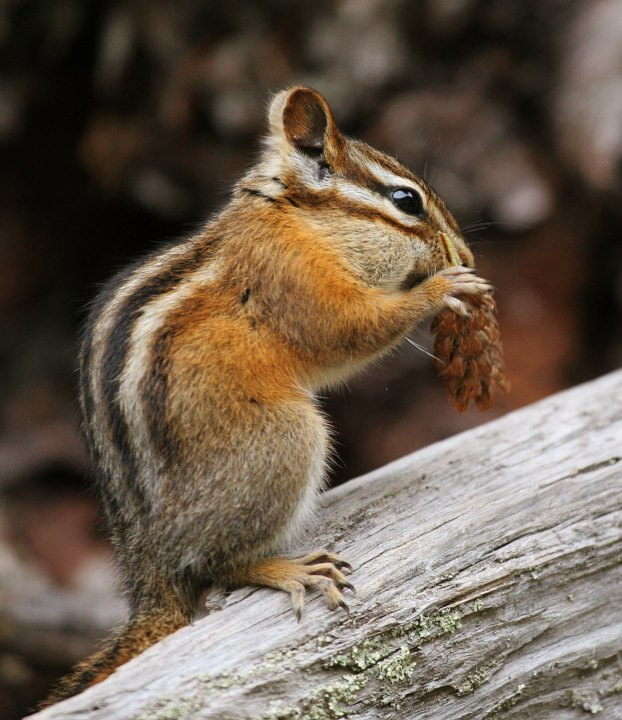
Real-life chipmunks were studied and integrated into Ross Bagdasarian Sr.'s characters.

The Chipmunks were animated by visual effects company Rhythm & Hues Studios, who previously animated creatures for projects such as Hocus Pocus (1993), Babe (1995), Stuart Little (1999), Cats & Dogs (2001), Scooby-Doo (2002), Dr. Seuss' The Cat in the Hat (2003), Garfield: The Movie (2004), and The Chronicles of Narnia: The Lion, the Witch and the Wardrobe (2005), the latter of which garnered Rhythm & Hues an Academy Award. As with past projects, Rhythm & Hues used its own software for animating Alvin and the Chipmunks. Programs Voodoo and Icy were used for placing the CGI into live-action shots, with Autodesk programs like Flame and Maya used as well.

According to Bagdasarian Jr., getting the look of the chipmunks suited for a live-action setting while maintaining the essence of the cartoon designs was challenging, and it took until September 2006 for the artists to get it right. Hill instructed the artists to make the chipmunks look realistic, but not entirely like chipmunks. In addition to observing real chipmunks offered by Universal Studios Inc., Rhythm & Hues studied all versions of the chipmunk characters from past Alvin media for conceiving, fur-texturing, and animating designs for the film. Human dancers were referenced for animating the dance movements of the chipmunks, and YouTube videos of famous guitarists playing the guitar influenced how Alvin's guitar-playing was animated. High-dynamic-range images of sets were also used for lighting the chipmunks to fit the live-action shots. The most difficult part of integrating the chipmunks in the shots was match moving for instances when they climb on Seville's head. For scenes where the chipmunks interacted with props, some were live-action props while others, such as a paper airplane, were produced and animated.

== Music ==
The soundtrack was released in November 2007, featuring songs such as "Witch Doctor" and "The Chipmunk Song (Christmas Don't Be Late)" (as made famous by David Seville and the Chipmunks), cover versions of songs such as "Bad Day" (as made famous by Daniel Powter) and "Funkytown" (as made famous by Lipps Inc.), and original songs such as "Coast 2 Coast", "Get You Goin'" and "Get Munk'd". Four songs from the album charted on the Billboard Hot 100. The album has been certified Platinum by the Recording Industry Association of America for shipments of over one million copies, thereby becoming the Chipmunks' third Platinum album, sixth RIAA-certified album and the first since Chipmunks in Low Places (which also went Platinum). The film score was composed and conducted by Christopher Lennertz; La-La Land Records released an album of it in September 2008.

== Release ==
=== Predictions and marketing ===
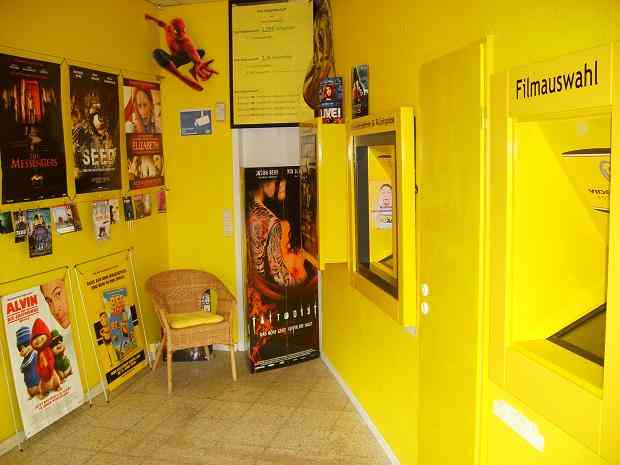
Interior of a video shop in Berlin with an Alvin film poster (bottom left) in 2008

Months before its release, film bloggers anticipated that Alvin and the Chipmunks would be a failure due to the involvement of the director of Garfield: A Tail of Two Kitties (2006), the writers of Snow Day (2000), the Ice Age films, Robots (2005), Big Momma's House 2 (2006), and the poor quality of previous live-action adaptations of old cartoons. In an August 2007 survey of 750 American teens run by eCRUSH and OTX, Alvin and the Chipmunks was one of the most anticipated films of the 2007 fall and winter seasons in the group. The first poster for Alvin and the Chipmunks was revealed online on July 4, 2007. Later that month, Fox launched the official website for Alvin and the Chipmunks with only a trailer and synopsis; several games were added later on. A video game adaptation was developed by Sensory Sweep Studios for Brash Entertainment, and released on December 4, 2007.

=== Response towards Cross ===
David Cross received backlash for his role in the film. In December 2007, comedian Patton Oswalt made a blog joke that he and Brian Posehn were offered the role of Ian but rejected it, adding, "We both threw the script across the room in disgust. David Cross caught it." In response, Cross said he had rejected the role initially but reconsidered.

=== Home media ===
The film was released on DVD and Blu-ray on April 1, 2008. This release sold 7.5 million DVD units ($127.6 million) in total becoming the third-best-selling DVD of 2008 in the United States, behind only The Dark Knight and Iron Man. The film was released on Disney+ in May 2025.

== Reception ==
=== Box office ===
Alvin and the Chipmunks was released in the United States and Canada on December 14, 2007. The film grossed $44.3 million in 3,475 theaters its opening weekend averaging to about $12,750 per venue, placing second at the box office behind I Am Legend. Its second weekend was $28.2 million. On its third weekend, it surpassed I Am Legend for number 2 at the box office, but ranked behind National Treasure: Book of Secrets. The film closed on Thursday June 5, 2008, making $217.3 million in North America, and $148 million overseas, for a total of $365.4 million worldwide. The film was produced on a budget of $55–60 million. The sustained box-office success surprised the studio; Elizabeth Gabler of Fox 2000 told the Los Angeles Times, "I look at the numbers every day, and we just laugh". Alvin was more profitable than either I Am Legend or National Treasure: Book of Secrets. According to MTV, it became the highest-grossing talking animal/cartoon adaptation until its sequel. It is 20th Century Fox's second-highest-grossing film that was released in 2007, behind only Live Free or Die Hard.

=== Critical response ===
On the review aggregator website Rotten Tomatoes, 28% of 107 critics' reviews are positive, with an average rating of 4.7/10. The website's consensus reads: "Though cutely rendered, Alvin and the Chipmunks suffers from bland potty humor and a rehashed kids' movie formula." This made it the highest-rated live-action animated Chipmunks film on the website. Metacritic, which uses a weighted average, assigned the film a score of 39 out of 100, based on 23 critics, indicating "generally unfavorable" reviews. Audiences polled by CinemaScore gave the film an average grade of "A" on an A+ to F scale.

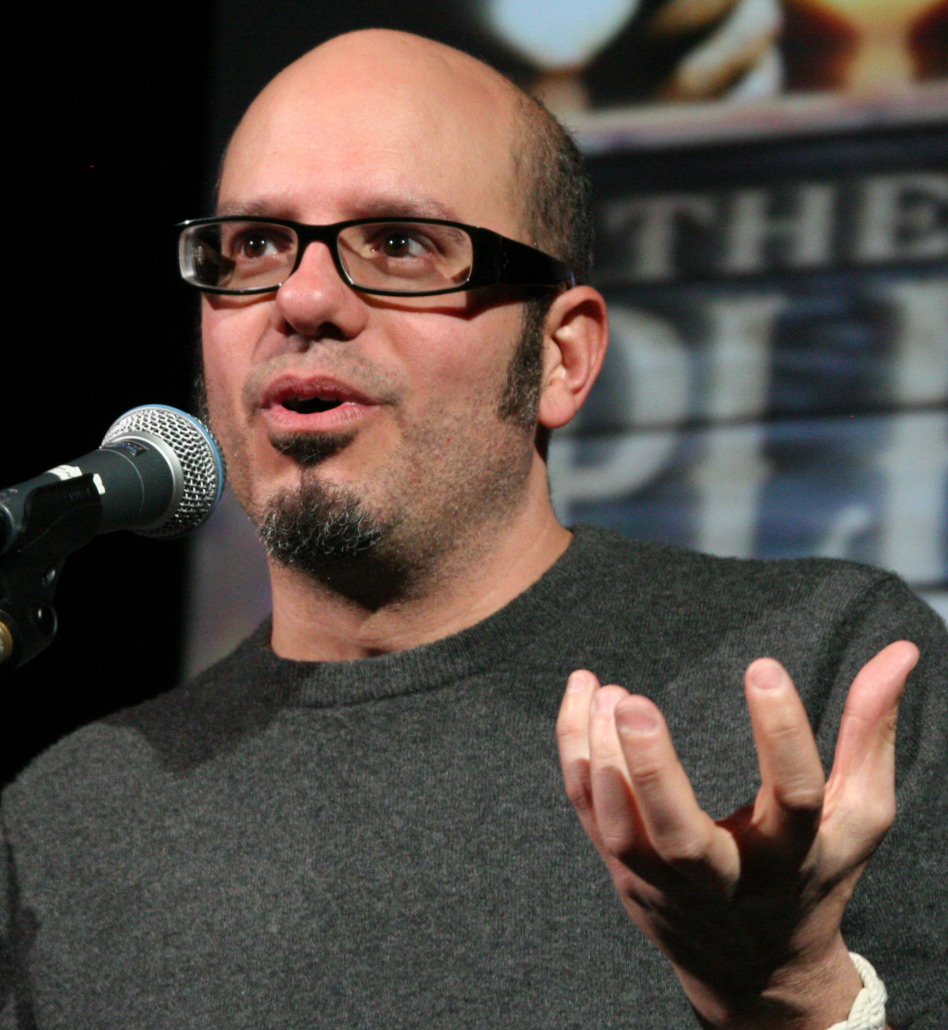
David Cross in 2007. Several film reviewers praised his performance as the villain.

Ty Burr of the Boston Globe said, "the script leans heavily on the pranks and big-eyed cuteness of the li'l guys and leaves the live actors with unfunny dialogue and nothing to do." According to The New York Times, "its animated protagonists are egregiously eclipsed by the live-action characters." The Chicago Reader criticized the lack of depth in the characters of David Seville and Ian Hawke, describing them as "cardboard". The film's satire on commercialism faced criticism for being contradictory, as it prominently featured popular brands, including the chipmunks themselves. Burr explained the film's message "is torn between the glitz that sells and the homilies that endure." Claudia Puig of USA Today gave the film a 1.5 out of 4 rating and said, "Sure, rodents are hot this year. But unlike Ratatouille's chef prodigy Remy, these mischief makers bring nothing new to the table."

Some critics took issue with Lee's subdued performance, particularly his underwhelming delivery of the iconic "Alvin!" yell. Andrew Grant of Première found, "Jason Lee makes for a sympathetic Dave, yet there's an almost somnambulistic quality to his performance," and Vice wrote that Lee's "rather 'cartoony' acting style here leaves a lot to be desired." However, Lee's acting did have some supporters for working as a likable protagonist, such as Time Out, a source that thought his "wry approach lends an edge to some of the script's wittier moments."

Some reviewers praised Cross' performance, such as Bill Goodykoontz of The Arizona Republic who said, "Cross is hilarious in everything he does, but he's surprisingly effective in a kids comedy." New York Times described Cross as "delightfully despicable, movie-stealing". However, reviewer Tim Robey admitted to being annoyed by Cross in the film. Andrew Grant called Richardson "sufficiently adorable and winsome, though the film's purity makes it difficult to imagine any sort of romantic entanglement." Roger Ebert of RogerEbert.com wrote, "Jason Lee and David Cross manfully play roles that require them, as actors, to relate with empty space that would later be filled with CGI."

When mentioning Seville's relationship with the Chipmunks and Ian's plans with them, The Philadelphia Inquirer wrote, "Ultimately, the values and the CGI are good, but the acting is broad and the chipmunks aren't really differentiated." Some critics praised the chipmunk protagonists; with Vice writing they were "integrated pretty well into the live-action elements." The A.V. Club wrote, "the manic Chipmunks wear out their welcome pretty quickly." The Globe and Mail commented: "you've got regulation-height dancers and musicians backing a singing group the size of kids' mittens." Some reviewers, including Ebert, also panned the lack of distinction between the chipmunks. However, Variety thought there was a "persuasive interaction of human and digital co-stars."

=== Accolades ===
Fox submitted Alvin and the Chipmunks to the Academy Awards for a Best Animated Feature before the film had a theatrical run required for the award; it was not nominated. The Movieguide Awards named Alvin and the Chipmunks the third best family film of 2007; PopMatters called it the second worst film of the year. It was also named one of 2007's worst pictures by science fiction writer John Varley. In 2011, Entertainment Weekly ranked Alvin and the Chipmunks the third worst live-action/animation hybrid film of all time. Complex and Screen Rant named it eleventh worst talking animal film of all time. In 2013, it was ranked by GamesRadar as the 48th worst Christmas movie ever. In 2016, Box Office Prophets ranked it the fifth worst live-action film based on a cartoon. The film also won the 2008 Kids' Choice Awards for Favorite Movie, a BMI Film & TV Award for Film Music, and was nominated for a Young Artist Award for Best Family Feature Film (Fantasy or Musical).

== Sequels ==
A sequel titled Alvin and the Chipmunks: The Squeakquel, was released on December 23, 2009. Zachary Levi joined the cast for the sequel, and the main cast members reprised their roles from the first film; the film introduced the Chipettes in the live-action film series. A third film, titled Alvin and the Chipmunks: Chipwrecked, was released on December 16, 2011. A fourth film, titled Alvin and the Chipmunks: The Road Chip, was released on December 18, 2015.
