= Qian Liu (economist) =

Chinese economist and business executive

Qian Liu (Chinese: 刘倩), also known as Louise Liu, is a Chinese economist and business executive. She is the founder and chief executive officer of Wusawa Advisory, a geopolitical and economic advisory firm. She previously served as Managing Director of The Economist Group in Greater China and held positions at the Economist Intelligence Unit (EIU).

Liu’s work has focused on labour economics, development economics, gender economics, and the Chinese economy. She has published academic research and has contributed commentary on economic and geopolitical issues.

== Early life and education ==
Liu birth and upbringing took place in China. She received a Ph.D. in Economics from Uppsala University in Sweden and was a visiting scholar at the University of California, Berkeley.

== Career ==
Liu began her career at the Economist Intelligence Unit as an econometrician focusing on economic analysis and forecasting related to China.

She later held management responsibilities within the EIU, including leadership of economic research activities. She subsequently became Managing Director of The Economist Group in Greater China, overseeing the organisation’s operations in the region.

In 2024, Liu founded Wusawa Advisory, a consulting firm focused on geopolitical and economic issues affecting international business and public policy.

== Research and publications ==
Liu’s academic research has focused on labour economics, development economics, education, unemployment, marriage markets, gender economics, and public policy.

She is the author of the Chinese-language book Gender Economics (性别经济学), which examines economic dimensions of education, employment, marriage, fertility, and family decision-making.

== Public commentary ==
Liu has contributed commentary on international economic and public policy issues, including articles published by Project Syndicate and other publications.

She has been interviewed by international media organisations regarding China’s economy, demographic trends, international trade, technological competition, and China–United States relations. These outlets include the BBC, NPR, Reuters, ABC Australia, and CNA.

== Professional affiliations and recognition ==
Liu was selected as a Young Global Leader by the World Economic Forum and has served as a member of the Forum’s Global Future Council on Geopolitics.

She is a member of the UN Women Global Women’s Leadership Network.

She has also participated in leadership programmes associated with the Aspen Institute.
