= Novertur =

- Website type: Social networking
- Launched: 2012

Novertur is an online business matchmaking and b2b social networking service dedicated to small and mid-sized enterprises (SMEs) and their international business development. Created in 2012 and launched in 2013, the Novertur network has thousands of active companies and provide access to information from more than ten thousands of SMEs in the world (data of May 2013). Following the social media trend, Novertur has been created to solve the problem of developing networks so to enter foreign markets, a recurring problem for small and mid-sized companies which are usually poorly equipped to grow international. Novertur has the particularity of mixing business matching with Web 2.0 technologies. The matchmaking system of Novertur is developed in collaboration with the University of Applied Sciences Western Switzerland HE ARC (Berne, Jura, Neuchâtel) and co-financed by the Swiss Confederation. This technology enables to automatically find complementary business partners abroad, while social networking tools allow to develop business relationships and trust. Moreover, the platform provides adapted profiles to providers of services and non-profit organizations that are supporting SMEs' expansion.

The site has a strong focus on companies located in European countries (Germany, Italy, UK, France) as well as a in India and Asia-Pacific countries. In 2013, it included mainly companies operating in the machinery, food production, textiles, and cleantech sectors.
