= Anonymous matching =

Matchmaking method

Anonymous matching is a matchmaking method facilitated by computer databases, in which each user confidentially selects people they are interested in dating and the computer identifies and reports matches to pairs of users who share a mutual attraction. Protocols for anonymous matchmaking date back to the 1980s, and one of the earliest papers on the topic is by Baldwin and Gramlich, published in 1985. From a technical perspective, the problem and solution are trivial and likely predate even this paper. The problem becomes interesting and requires more sophisticated cryptography when the matchmaker (central server) is not trusted.

The purpose of the protocol is to allow people to initiate romantic relationships while avoiding the risk of embarrassment, awkwardness, and other negative consequences associated with unwanted romantic overtures and rejection. The general concept was patented on 7 September 1999, by David J. Blumberg and DoYouDo chief executive officer Gil S. Sudai, but several websites were already employing the methodology by that date, and thus apparently were allowed to continue using it. United States Patent 5,950,200 points out several potential flaws in traditional courtship and in conventional dating systems in which strangers meet online, promoting anonymous matching of friends and acquaintances as a better alternative:

Human relationships are often fraught with difficulties. In addition, human beings are risk-averse. Often, even when two people want to initiate first steps in a relationship, neither person takes action because of shyness, fear of rejection, or other societal pressures or constraints. Various systems exist that help people meet each other. For example, computer dating services allow people to view video tapes or pictures of prospective partners or to choose common areas of hobbies. Two people are introduced only if both agree with the idea. Unfortunately, in such situations, neither person has actually met the other when they are finally introduced. Neither person has ever met the other, and there is a certain amount of shyness and fear of rejection when they first meet in such a situation. In addition, both persons must initially approach the dating service. For some people, such an action can also be embarrassing. What is needed is a safe, simple, confidential, and non-judgmental way for people to reveal their true feelings and interests without risk of embarrassment or rejection.

== Implementations ==
Some of the most notable implementations of the idea have been:

- Baldwin and Gramlich, as cited above.
- eCRUSH. launched Valentine's Day, 1999, is the most successful implementation of the concept. Targeted to the teen market, it has more than 1.6 million users and claims more than 600,000 legitimate matches
- The LiveJournal Secret Crush meme. In mid-2003, a company named Anonymous Consulting created an online quiz called "Secret Crush Meme," which would provide each user with a chart showing who on their LiveJournal friends list had a crush on them, as well as what "kind" of crush they had (public, secret or ex). The quiz was designed to harvest crushes between LiveJournal users (hence the elaborate disclaimer). In October 2003, a new quiz, called "Secret Crush Meme 2: The Revenge of Secret Crush Meme," was released , which showed users how many crushes other users had on them, as well as what kind. There was a catch: For four dollars, the company would tell someone who had crushes on them. This created controversy between couples who listed other users as crushes as well as people getting ex-crushes when they felt they should have gotten public crushes, and much ethics debating. Finally a small PERL script was written and distributed to poison the database. Faced with attempts to poison the database from many different IP addresses, the project was shut down.
- SecretAdmirer.com. This service claims 100,000 successful matches . Salon.com called SecretAdmirer.com "the grandfather of the concept, launched in 1997." Its methodology is different from the others in that in order for a match to occur, the recipient must send emails out, rather than simply place names on a confidential list.

These commercial implementations all trust the central server, simplifying the solution and implementation drastically. Baldwin and Gramlich solved this case in 1985, as well as the more notable and challenging case in which the central server isn't trusted.

== Viral marketing ==
eCRUSH, DoYOU2.com, the LiveJournal Secret Crush meme, and SecretAdmirer.com are examples of anonymous matching services using viral marketing to increase their membership. Users are encouraged to send an anonymous email to their crush so that they will visit the site and enter their own crushes, facilitating a match. In the case of SecretAdmirer.com, the email is mandatory; this represents a more aggressive type of viral marketing.

At least one site, CrushLink, was accused by eCRUSH of sending spam emails disguised as crush notifications. According to a Salon article, "What makes SomeoneLikesYou and Crushlink different from the rest of the sites in the genre is this: they bait hopeful visitors to hand over as many e-mail addresses as possible by trading clues for e-mail addresses". Both sites are now defunct.
