= Khatba =

Egyptian matchmaker

In Egyptian culture, a khatba (Arabic: خاطب) is a (traditionally female) professional mediator or broker of relationships, who is hired to help in finding a suitable marriage partner. Traditionally, a young person would make use of the services of a khatba when their family and friends were unable to find a suitable mate. Their services are especially necessary outside of Egypt's large cities, in more traditional Islamic areas, where male and female youths are not permitted to mingle freely. In these areas, khatbas are typically paid for their services with non-monetary goods or services, such as gifts or favors.

In popular media, khatbas are often represented as modestly-dressed middle-aged women, who carry photographs of marriageable youths to display to their clients. Although they are considered a stereotypical figure of the 1940s to mid-1960s, many modern Egyptian youth still employ khatbas in one form or another. As of 2013, less than one out of every hundred married Egyptian youth report meeting their partner through a khatba.

== See also ==
- Matchmaking
