= Nelle Brooke Stull =

American activist

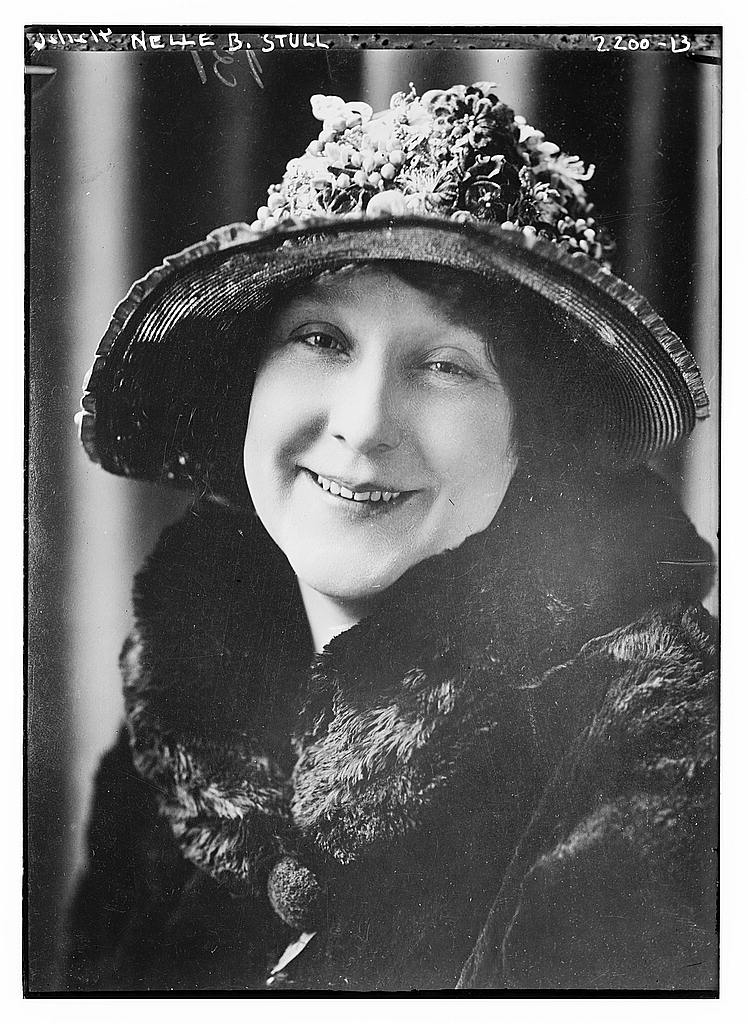
Nelle Brooke Stull

Nelle Brooke Stull of Elyria, Ohio was founder and president of the Widows' & Widowers' Club, which introduced bereaved men and women to each other in hope of making new matches. "I am the love fixer. I make men and women happy. My theory is that every Jill has her Jack," said Stull.
