= ECRUSH =

American social networking websites (1999–2011)

eCRUSH
- Website type: social network service
- Owner: Hearst Corporation
- Creators: Clark Benson, Karen DeMars Pillsbury
- Website: eCRUSH.com
- Registration: Yes
- Launched: February 14, 1999
- Current status: Defunct as of August 1, 2011

The eCRUSH network consisted of two sites: eCRUSH.com and eSPIN.com. The network was acquired by Hearst Media on December 31, 2006. The original eCRUSH site was opened on February 14, 1999 in Chicago by Clark Benson and Karen DeMars Pillsbury. It pre-dated social networking sites such as Friendster, MySpace and Facebook.

== eSPIN ==
eSPIN was a spin the bottle-like social networking service backed by a matchmaking engine. Users would "spin the bottle" to find other users (although they could also search); the site also had quizzes. Registration was free, however, one had to pay a monthly fee or unlock various tools via sponsors to do key processes like chatting or sending messages.

The New York Times cited that eSPIN had registered more than 3.8 million users as of January 2007. ComScore Media Metrix measured their monthly unique visitors at 1,514,000 and monthly page views at 133MM (December 2008).

=== Age restrictions ===
eSPIN prohibited minors from contacting adults and vice versa, and their administrators screened user-submitted content before it was made public. Additionally, minors were prohibited from publicly posting contact information like email addresses and screen names.

== eCRUSH ==
eCRUSH.com was a teen-oriented anonymous matching site designed to obviate fears of unrequited love. A user created a list of people he was interested in, and had the option of sending anonymous emails to those individuals indicating that an unidentified person had a crush on them. The recipient could then log on to the site and create a list of people they were interested in. If the two people selected each other, then the system notified them of the match. This system is a type of viral marketing in which awareness of the site spreads among friends and acquaintances similarly to a virus as they list each other as crushes and send emails.

== Other aspects of eCRUSH ==
=== Demographics ===
In accordance with the Children's Online Privacy Protection Act of 1998, eCRUSH shut down the existing accounts of children who identified themselves as being under thirteen. According to a Red Herring article, "eCRUSHONLINE.com is seizing an elusive but highly desirable audience of young, mostly female viewers, ranging in age from 10 to 37." According to that article, the service saw its biggest growth at high schools and colleges.

=== The "Don't Be An Idiot" Campaign ===
In January 2009, eSPIN began the "Don't Be An Idiot" campaign to educate teens about online safety. The campaign consisted of a safety hub page, a safety quiz, a YouTube video and a place to submit safety stories.

=== Spam related issues ===
The company's emails promised, "At eCRUSH, we know how important your love life is to you, and we would never take advantage of your emotions just to spam your crush." However, an April 22, 1999 article in Ohio University's The Post argued, "It is rare to be matched up with your one and only by trickery or bizarre circumstance. When eCRUSH's initial e-mail is sent, the recipient might discard it like a chain letter or an invitation to a porn site".

The "Someone has an eCRUSH on you" emails did not list the name of anyone the friend knows; therefore, a recipient unfamiliar with eCRUSH could very well interpret them as spam. Moreover, as with many commercial emails, eCRUSH's messages contained images that, for privacy reasons, would be peremptorily blocked by most modern email clients – another red flag suggesting spam to many users. Lastly, the email subject lines – for example, "Someone you know likes you!" — resembled those employed in mass mailings from other dating sites.

=== Deactivation of Websites ===
On August 1, 2011, the entire eCRUSH/eSPIN network was deactivated by Hearst Digital Media, and all eCRUSH-related domains began redirecting to a Seventeen.com-hosted landing page.
