= Matchmaking =

Process of matching two or more people together, usually for the purpose of marriage

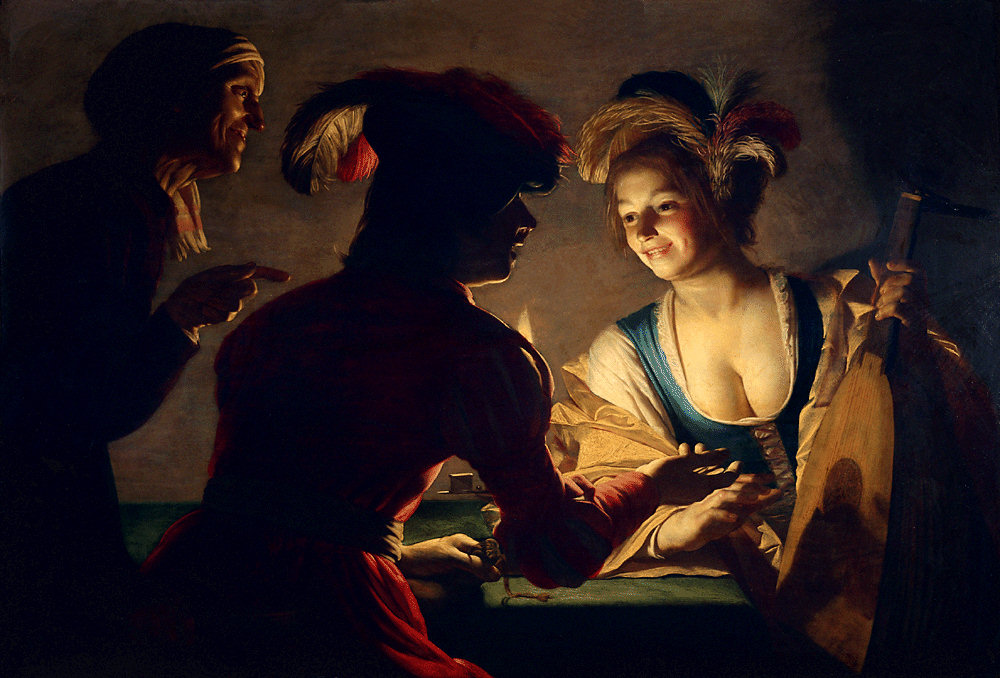
The Matchmaker, by Gerard van Honthorst (1625)

Matchmaking is the process of pairing two or more people together, usually for the purpose of marriage, in which case the intermediary or matchmaker is also known as a marriage broker. Matchmaking may be done as a profession for a fee or it may be done by clergy.

The term is also used in the context of other analogous pairing activities, such as with sporting events such as boxing, in business, online video games and in pairing organ donors.

== Practice ==
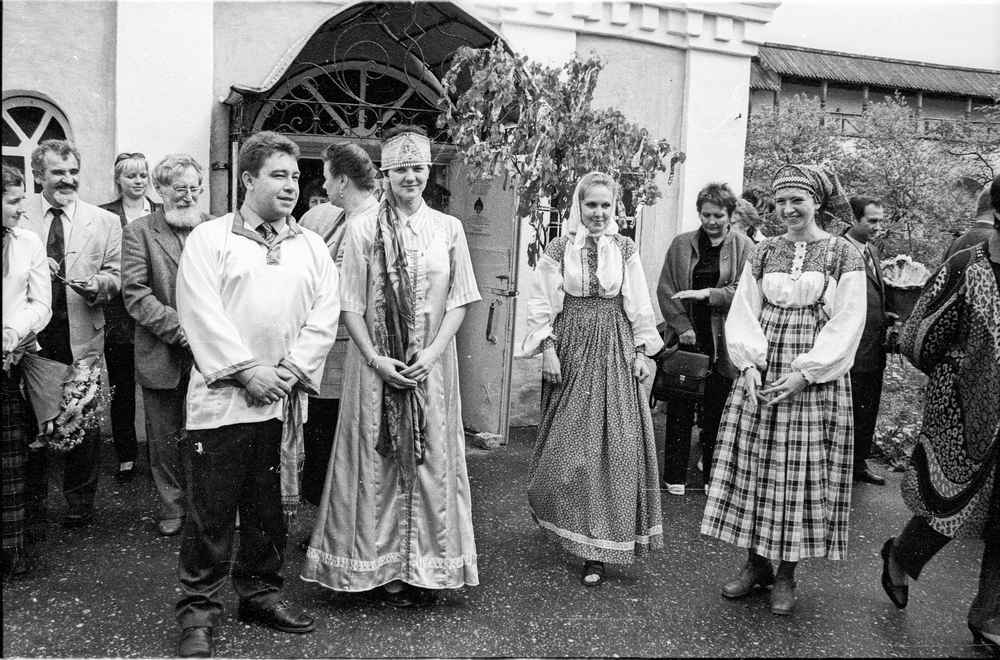
Traditional matchmaking is a usual folk program in Russian museums.

In some cultures, the role of the matchmaker was and is quite professionalised, and matchmakers charge a fee.

=== Jewish cultures ===
Historically in Ashkenazi Jewish families, a professional marriage broker, called a shadchan, used "gossip and a corresponding sense of discretion" to "diplomatically scop[e] out the pool of possibilities and securing alliances between families—for a fee." Shadchans, who could be men or women, "functioned like good-will ambassadors" between families. Jewish matchmaking grew as a result of the unrest caused by the Crusades in Europe. Violence, destruction, and death in the Jewish communities interrupted social life so the shadkhan played a pivotal role in connecting people. In this way, the Shadkin protected and maintained the continuity of the Jewish people. By the late 19th and early 20th century, the shadchan lost their social standing and they were "vilified for having commercialized affairs of the heart", and they became ridiculed in literature for their "guile" and they were seen as symbols of an "outmoded" way of life. By the late 1930s the "Jewish marriage maven became more of a curiosity" than a serious element of matchmaking in the United States.

A contemporary Jewish example combines automated recommendations with personal matchmakers: Chabad's Met@Chabad uses artificial intelligence to suggest matches based on interests, patterns and values, while rabbis and rebbetzins vet participants and provide mentorship.

=== Other cultures ===
The Hindu astrologers were often thought to be essential advisors and also helped in finding right spouses as they had links and a relation of good faith with the families. In cultures where arranged marriages were the rule, the astrologer used stars to sanctify matches that both parents approved of. Tarot divination has also been employed by some matchmakers.

Social dance, especially in frontier North America, the contra dance and square dance, has also been employed in matchmaking, usually informally. However, when farming families were widely separated and kept all children on the farm working, marriage-age children could often only meet in church or in such mandated social events. Matchmakers, acting as formal chaperones or as self-employed "busybodies" attended such events and advise families of burgeoning romances.

The influence of such people in a culture that did not arrange marriages, and in which economic relationships (e.g. "being able to support a family", "good prospects") played a larger role in determining if a (male) suitor was acceptable, is difficult to determine.

Clergy probably played a key role in most Western cultures, as they continue to do in modern ones, especially where they are the most trusted mediators in the society. Matchmaking was certainly one of the peripheral functions of the village priest in Medieval Catholic society, as well as a duty of rabbis in traditional Jewish communities. Today, the shidduch is a system of matchmaking in which Jewish singles are introduced to one another in Orthodox Jewish communities.

In the 2010s and 2020s there has been a resurgence of interest in traditional matchmaking. Dissatisfaction with dating apps, television shows like Million Dollar Matchmaker and Indian Matchmaking, and a pandemic that made it harder for singles to meet organically created increased interest the role of the professional matchmaker. Those who find dating systems or services useful but prefer human intelligence and personal touches can choose from a wide range of such services now available. These services may rely on personality tests (but genetics has even been proposed), aiming to maximize the identification of the best match.

=== In Asia ===
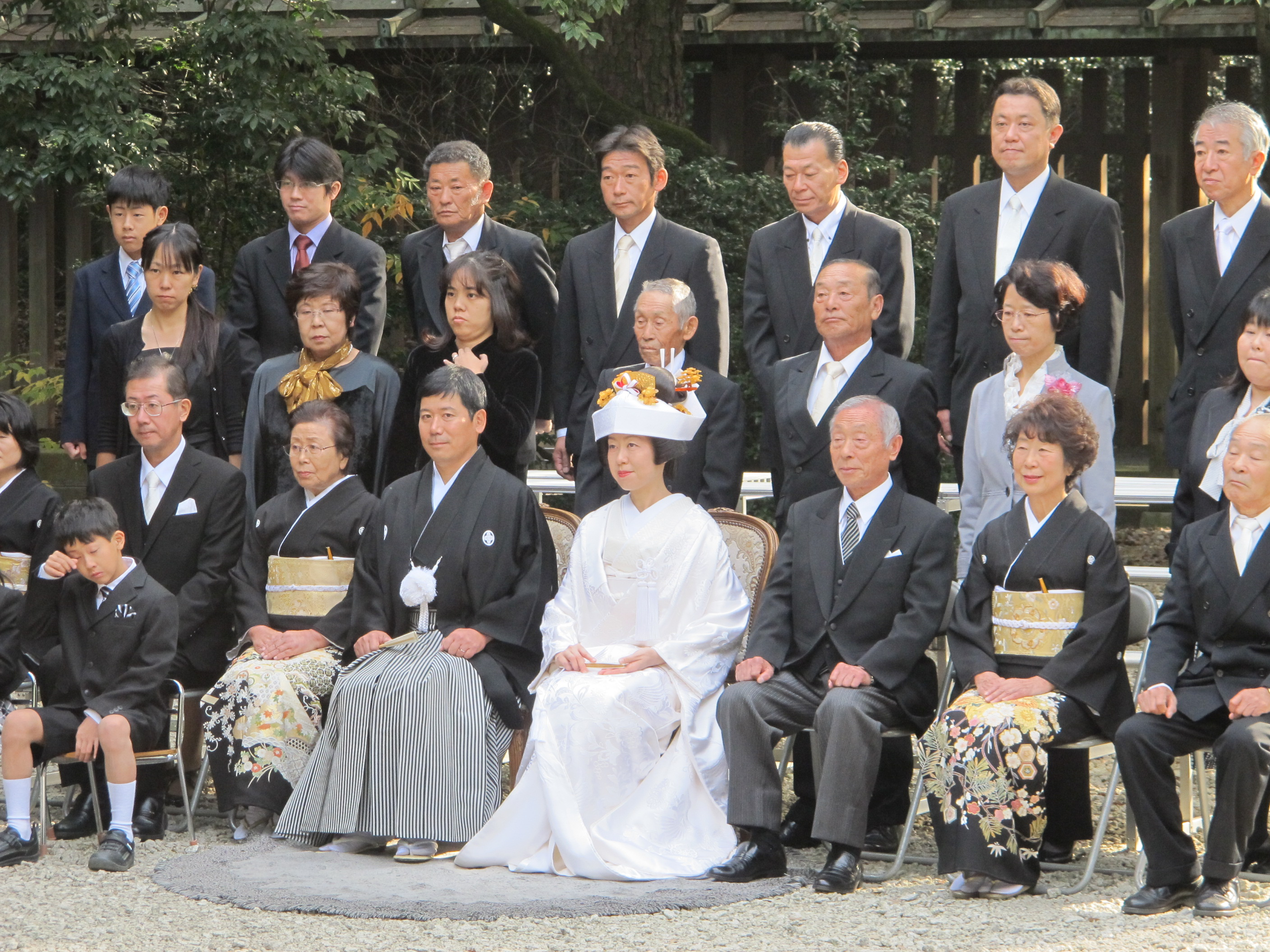
Matchmakers sitting on either side of the bride and groom in this Japanese wedding photo

In Singapore, the Social Development Unit (SDU), run by the city-state's government, offers a combination of professional counsel and dating system technology, like many commercial dating services. Thus the role of the matchmaker has become institutionalized, as a bureaucrat, and every citizen in Singapore has access to some subset of the matchmaking services that were once reserved for royalty or upper classes.

As of July 2023, there were 50 Iranian dating agencies according to Ministry of Islamic Culture and Guidance.

== Other uses ==
=== Business ===
The concept of matchmaking is also used in the business world, as the analogous goal of pairing compatible partners is used. It may be called business to business (B2B) matchmaking, investor matchmaking, business speed dating, or brokerage events. In contradiction to social networking approaches, in-person meetings between business people are used. Trade fair organizations find this concept an added value for their exhibitors because it gives them the opportunity of advanced planned meetings. Following the inspiration of dating sites, some online B2B networking platforms developed business matching approaches people to identify potential business partners.

=== Sports and recreation ===
Some sports leagues have matchmaking services to help players of sports find compatible playing partners.

== See also ==
- Anonymous matching
- Contact (computer dating)
- Dating agency
- Genetic matchmaking
- Collaborative filtering
- Mail-order bride
- Marriage market
- Matrimonial website
- Stable marriage problem
- The old man under the moon: fabled Chinese matchmaker
- Pattern matching
- Novertur: Business matchmaking platform
- Khatbas: Traditional Egyptian matchmakers

People

- Robert Stewart Sparks, Los Angeles City Hall matchmaker, 20th century
- Nelle Brooke Stull, founder and president of the Widows' & Widowers' Club, 20th century
