= Marriage market =

An environment in which people attempt to find optimal marriage-partners

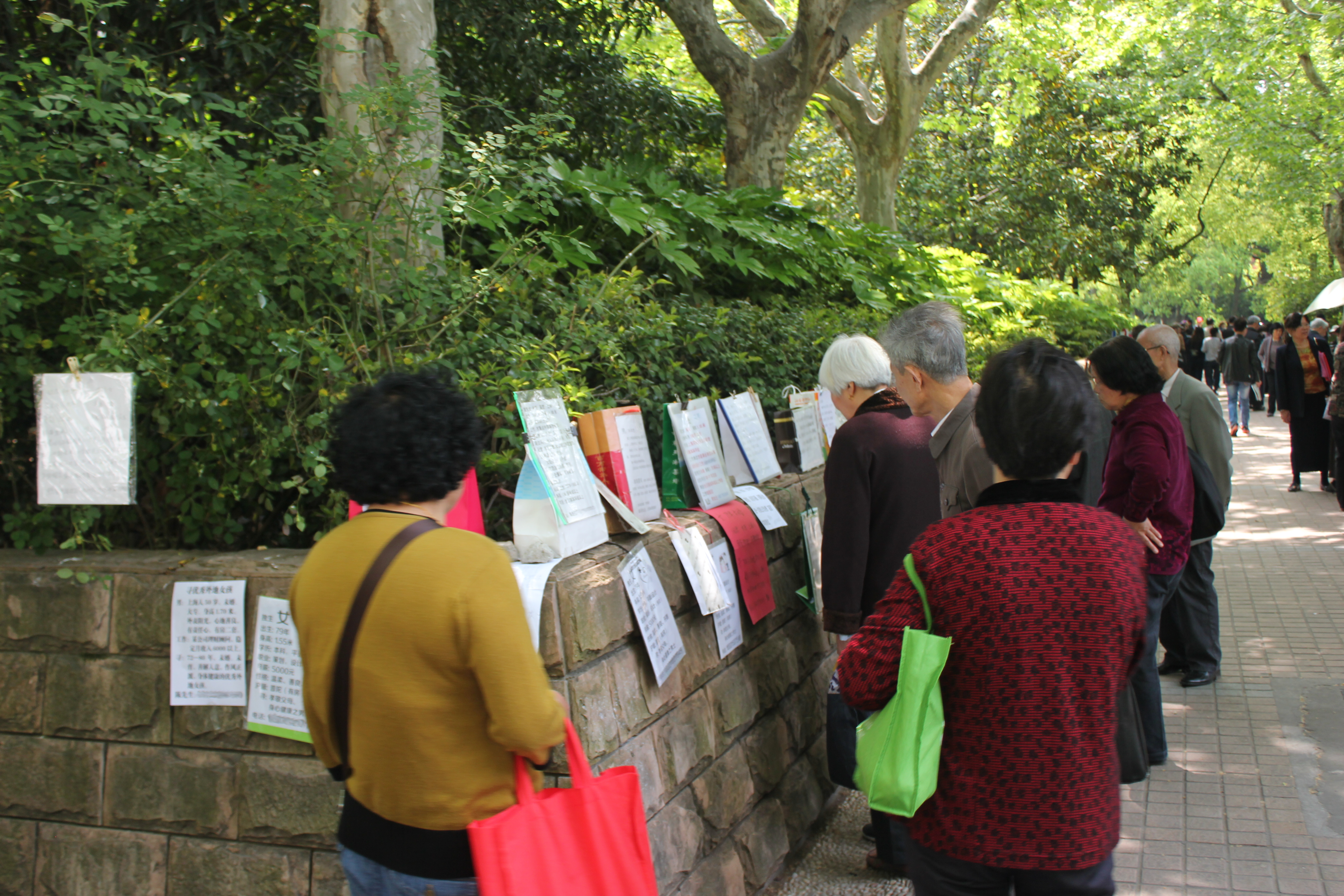
Parents browse marriage classified ads at the Shanghai Marriage Market

A marriage market is an environment in which people attempt to find optimal marriage-partners. In China, for example, the market can take the form of a public place where parents list advertisements for their children with the aim of finding a marital spouse for them. People then congregate there and read the listings, often in the hope of finding a marital match. Several marriage markets exist in China, such as Shanghai's marriage market at People's Square and at several parks and other public places in Beijing, such as shopping malls. Such marriage markets exemplify a part or aspect of what some sociologists term a marriage marketplace — a mate selection process.

== In other regions ==
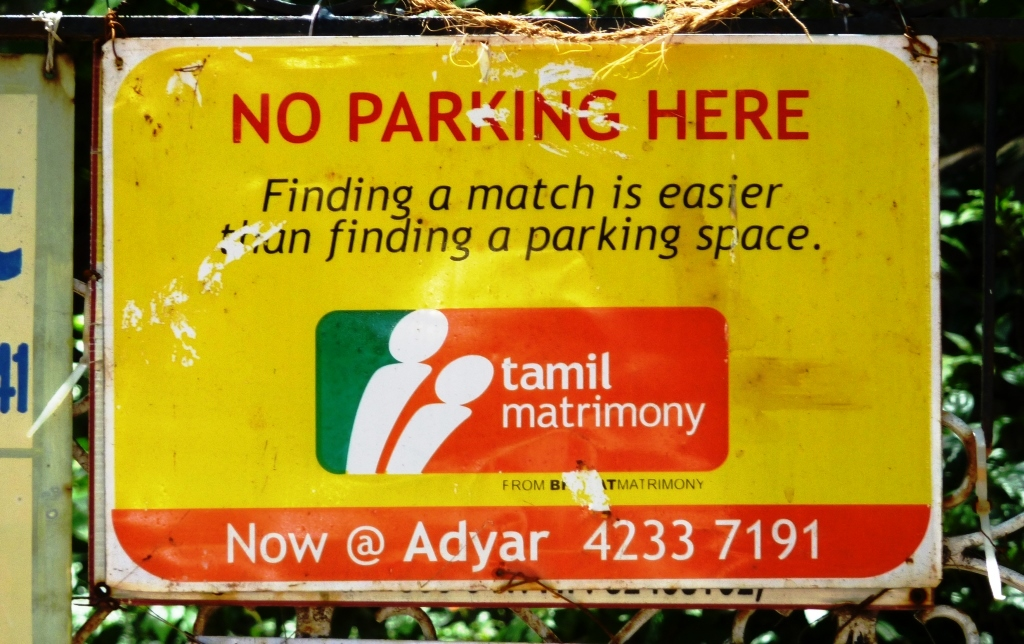
In India, matrimonial websites serve the purpose of a marriage market

The use of marriage brokers and marriage bureaus that are involved in matchmaking to unite people in marriage is common in India and other parts of South Asia. In India, the use of marriage brokers was estimated to be a ₹250 billion industry in October 2011. Marriage brokers exist in New Delhi and other regions of India.

== See also ==
- Arranged marriage
- Arranged marriage in the Indian subcontinent
- Chinese marriage
- Dating in China
- Singles Day
